= List of state leaders in 19th-century British South Asia subsidiary states =

This is a list of state leaders in the 19th century (1701–1800) AD, of British South Asia. These polities are vassal states under a subsidiary alliance to the British East India Company, and then the British Raj. Afghan monarchies and non-British colonies are listed at (1801–1850)#Asia: South and (1851–1900)#Asia: South.

== Main ==
- British East India: Company rule in India

Joint-stock colony under the East India Company, 1757–1858

- British Raj

Colony and princely states, 1858–1947
For details see the United Kingdom under British Isles, Europe
See also the list of princely states of British India (alphabetical) for all princely states

== Bengal and Northeast India ==
- Ahom kingdom (complete list) –

- Suklingphaa, King (1795–1811)
- Sudingphaa, King (1811–1818)
- Purandar Singha, King (1818–1819)
- Sudingphaa, King (1819–1821)
- Jogeswar Singha, King (1821–1822)
- Purandar Singha, King (1833–1838)

- Bengal Subah (complete list) –

Bengal
- Baber Ali Khan, Nawab (1793–1810)
- Zain-ud-Din Ali Khan, Nawab (1810–1821)
- Ahmad Ali Khan, Nawab (1821–1824)
- Mubarak Ali Khan II, Nawab (1824–1838)
- Mansur Ali Khan, Nawab (1838–1880)
Murshidabad
- Hassan Ali Mirza Khan Bahadur, Nawab (1882–1906)

- Cooch Behar (complete list) –

- Regents (1783–1801)
- Harendra Narayan, Raja (1783–1839)
- Bajendra Narayan, Regent (1836–1839)
- Shivendra Narayan, Raja (1839–1847)
- Narendra Narayan, Raja (1847–1863)
- Bajendra Narayan, Regent (1847–1857)
- Maharani Vrisundeshwari, Regent (f) (1857–1860)
- Maharani Kameshwari, Regent (f) (?–1889)
- Nripendra Narayan, Raja (1863–1884)
- Maharani Kameswari, Regent (f) (1863–1883)
- Maharani Vrisundeshwari, Regent (f) (1863–1883)
- Ram Bahadur Singh, Regent (1863–1883)
- Maharani Nistarini Deo, Regent (f) (1863–1883)
- Nripendra Narayan, Maharaja (1884–1911)

- Jaintia Kingdom –

- Ram Singh II, King (1790–1832)
- Rajendra Singh, King (1832–1835)

- Mallabhum (complete list) –

- Chaitanya Singha Dev, King (1748–1801)
- Madhav Singha Dev, King (1801–1809)
- Gopal Singha Dev II, King (1809–1876)
- Ramkrishna Singha Dev, King (1876–1885)
- Dwhajamoni Devi (1885–1889)
- Nilmoni Singha Dev, King (1889–1903)

- Manipur (complete list) ––

- Rohinchandra, King (1798–1801)
- Maduchandra Singh, King (1801–1806)
- Charajit Singh, King (1806–1812)
- Marjit Singh, King (1812–1819)

under Burmese rule from 1819
subsidiary to the British Raj from 1824

- Chinglen Nongdrenkhomba, King (1825–1834)
- Nara Singh, Regent (1834–1844)
- Nara Singh, King (1834–1850)
- Debindro Singh, King (1850)
- Chandrakirti Singh, King (1850–1886)
- Surachandra Singh, King (1886–1890)
- Kulachandra Singh, King (1890–1891)
- Churachandra Singh, King (1891–1941)

- Kingdom of Sikkim (complete list) –

- Tsugphud Namgyal, Chogyal (1793–1863)
- Sidkeong Namgyal, Chogyal (1863–1874)
- Thutob Namgyal, Chogyal (1874–1914)

- Tripura (princely state) ––

- Durga Manikya, King (1809–1813)
- Kashi Chandra Manikya, King (1826–1830)
- Krishna Kishore Manikya, King (1830–1849)

- Twipra Kingdom –

- Rajdhar Manikya, King (1783–1804)
- Ramgana Manikya, King (1804–1809)

== Bhutan ==
- Bhutan (complete list) –

- Druk Namgyel, Druk Desis (1799–1803)
- Sonam Gyaltshen (Tashi Namgyel), Druk Desis (1803–1805)
- Sangye Tenzin, Druk Desis (1805–1806)
- Umzey Parob, Druk Desis (1806–1808)
- Byop Chhyoda, Druk Desis (1807–1808)
- Tsulthrim Daba, Druk Desis (1809–1810)
- Thutul (Jigme Dragpa), Druk Desis (1810–1811)
- Chholay Yeshey Gyaltshen, Druk Desis (1811–1815)
- Tshaphu Dorji Namgyel, Druk Desis (1815)
- Sonam Drugyel, Druk Desis (1815–1819)
- Tenzin Drukda, Druk Desis (1819–1823)
- Chhoki Gyaltshen, Druk Desis (1823–1831)
- Dorji Namgyal, Druk Desis (1831–1832)
- Adab Thinley, Druk Desis (1832–1835)
- Chhoki Gyaltshen, Druk Desis (1835–1838)
- Dorji Norbu, Druk Desis (1838–1850)
- Wangchuk Gyalpo, Druk Desis (1850–1850)
- Thutul (Jigme Dragpa), Druk Desis (1850–1852)
- Sangye, Druk Desis (1851–1852)
- Damchho Lhundrup, Druk Desis (1852–1854)
- Jamtul Jamyang Tenzin, Druk Desis (1854–1856)
- Kunga Palden, Druk Desis (1856–1860)
- Sherab Tharchin, Druk Desis (1856–1860)
- Phuntsho Namgyel (Nazi Pasang), Druk Desis (1860–1863)
- Tshewang Sithub, Druk Desis (1863–1864)
- Tsulthrim Yonten, Druk Desis (1864–1864)
- Kagyud Wangchuk, Druk Desis (1864–1864)
- Tshewang Sithub, Druk Desis (1865–1867)
- Tsondul Pekar, Druk Desis (1867–1870)
- Jigme Namgyel, Druk Desis (1870–1873)
- Kitshab Dorji Namgyel, Druk Desis (1873–1879)
- Jigme Namgyel, Druk Desis (1877–1878)
- Kitsep Dorji Namgyel, Druk Desis (1878–1879)
- Chhogyel Zangpo, Druk Desis (1879–1880)
- Jigme Namgyel, Druk Desis (1880–1881)
- Lam Tshewang, Druk Desis (1881–1883)
- Gawa Zangpo, Druk Desis (1883–1885)
- Sangye Dorji, Druk Desis (1885–1901)

== Burma ==
- British Burma, part of the British Raj (complete list) –

British colony, 1824–1948
For details see the United Kingdom under British Isles, Europe

- Hsipaw (complete list) –

- Sao Hswe Kya, Saopha (1788–1809)
- Sao Hkun Hkwi, Saopha (1809–1843)
- Sao Hkun Paw, Saopha (1843–1853)
- Sao Kya Htun, Saopha (1853–1858)
- Hkun Myat Thade, Saopha (1858–1866)
- Sao Kya Hkeng, Saopha (1866–1902)

- Kengtung State (complete list) ––

- Sao Kawng Tai I, Saopha (1787–1802, 1814–1815)
- Sao Maha Hkanan, Saopha (1815–1857)
- Sao Maha Pawn, Saopha (1857–1876)
- Sao Hseng, Saopha (1877–1881)
- Sao Kawng Tai II, Saopha (1881–1885)
- Sao Kawn Kham Hpu, Saopha (1886–1895)
- Sao Kawng Kiao Intaleng, Administrator (?–1897), Saopha (1895–1935)

- Mongnai (complete list) –

- Maung Shwe Paw, Myoza (c.1802–1848)
- Maung Yit, Myoza (1848–1850)
- U Po Ka, Myoza (1850–1851)
- U Shwe Kyu, Myoza (1852)
- Hkun Nu Nom, Saopha (1852–1875)
- Hkun Kyi, Saopha (1875–1882)
- Twet Nga Lu, usurper Saopha (1882–1888)
- Hkun Kyi, Saopha (1888–1914)

== India ==
- Ajaigarh (complete list) –

- Ali Bahadur, usurper Raja (1793–1802)
- Shamsher Bahadur, usurper Raja (1802–1804)
- Lakshman Dada, usurper Raja (1804–1807)
- Bakht Singh, Raja (1807–1837)
- Madho Singh, Raja (1837–1849)
- Mahipat Singh, Raja (1849–1853)
- Bijal Singh, Raja (1853–1855)
- interregnum, Raja (1855–1859)
- Ranjor Singh, Raja (1859–1877)
- Ranjor Singh, Maharaja (1877–1919)

- Akkalkot (complete list) –

- Fatehsinh II, Chief (1789–1822)
- Maloji I, Chief (1822–1823)
- Shahaji II, Chief (1823–1857)
- Maloji II, Chief (1857–1870)
- Shahaji III, Chief (1870–1896)
- Fatehsinhrao III Raje Bhosle, Chief (1896–1923)

- Alirajpur (complete list) ––

- Pratap Singh I, Rana (1765–1818)
- Musafir Mekran, Rana (1818)
- Jashwant Singh, Rana (1818–1862)
- Musafir Mekran, Manager (1818–1839)
- Gang Deo, Rana (1862–1869)
- Rup Deo, Rana (1869–1881)
- Muhammad Najaf Khan, Superintendent (1869–1873)
- Bijai Singh, Rana (1881–1890)
- Pratap Singh II, Rana (1891–1911)

- Alwar (complete list) –

- Bakhtawar Singh Prabhakar, Raja (1791–1815)
- Bane Singh Prabhakar, Raja (1815–1857)
- Sheodan Singh Prabhakar, Raja (1857–1874)
- Mangal Singh Prabhakar, Maharaja (1874–1892)
- Jai Singh Prabhakar, Maharaja (1892–1937)

- Arakkal kingdom (complete list) –

- Bibi Junumabe II, Raja (1777–1819)

- Balasinor (complete list) –

- Salabat Khanji Jamiyat Khanji, Nawab Babi (1820)
- Abid Khanji May, Nawab Babi (1820–1822)
- Jalal Khanji, Nawab Babi (1822–1831)
- Zorawar Khanji, Nawab Babi (1831–1882)
- Munawar Khanji Zorawar Khanji, Nawab Babi (1882–1899)
- Jamiyat Khanji Munawar Khanji, Nawab Babi (1899–1945)

- Banganapalle (complete list) –

- Mozaffar al-Molk Asad `Ali Khan, Kiladar (1790–1814)
- Gholam `Ali Khan I, Kiladar (1790–1822)
- Hosayn `Ali Khan, Kiladar (1822–1831)
- Hosayn `Ali Khan, Kiladar (1848–1848)
- Gholam Mohammad `Ali Khan II, Kiladar (1848–1868)
- Fath `Ali Khan, Kiladar (1868–1876)
- Fath `Ali Khan, Nawab (1876–1905)

- Bansda (complete list) –

- Raisimhji, Raja Sahib (1793–1815)
- Udaisimhji IV, Raja Sahib (1815–1828)
- Hamirsimhji, Maharaja Sahib (1828–1861)
- Ghulabsimhji II, Maharaja Sahib (1861–1876)
- Pratapsimhji Ghulabsimhji, Maharaja Sahib (1876–1911)

- Banswara (complete list) –

- Bijai Singh, Rai Rayan (1786–1816)
- Umaid Singh, Rai Rayan (1816–1819)
- Bhawani Singh, Rai Rayan (1819–1838)
- Bahadur Singh, Rai Rayan (1838–1844)
- Regent (1844–1856)
- Lakshman Singh, Rai Rayan (1844–1905)

- Baoni (complete list) –

- Naser ad-Dowla, Nawab (1800–1815)
- Amir al-Molk, Nawab (1815–1838)
- Mohammad Hosayn, Nawab (1838–1859)
- Emam ad-Dowla Hosayn, Nawab (1859–1883)
- Mohammad Hasan Khan, Nawab (1883–1893)
- Riaz al-Hasan Khan, Nawab (1893–1911)

- Baraundha (complete list) –

- Mohan Singh, Thakur (1790–1827)
- Sarabjit Singh, Thakur (1827–1867)
- Raghubar Dayal Singh, Thakur (1874–1885)
- Maharaja Ram Pratap Singh, Thakur (1886–1908)

- Baria (complete list) –

- Dhiratsimhji Gambhirsimhji, Raja (18th–19th century)
- Jashwantsimhji Sahibsimhji, Raja (c.1803)
- Gangdasji II Jashwantsimhji, Raja (1800s–1819)
- Prithvirajji II Gangdasji, Raja (1819)
- Rupji, Raja (1819)
- Bhimsimhji Gangdasji, Raja (1819–1820)
- Prithvirajji II Gangdasji, Raja (1820–1864)
- Mansimhji II Prithirajji, Maharawals (1864–1908)

- Baroda: Gaekwad dynasty

- Monarchs (complete list) –

- Anand Rao Gaekwad, Maharaja (1800–1818)
- Sayaji Rao Gaekwad II, Maharaja (1818–1847)
- Ganpat Rao Gaekwad, Maharaja (1847–1856)
- Khande Rao Gaekwad, Maharaja (1856–1870)
- Malhar Rao Gaekwad, Maharaja (1870–1875)
- Maharaja Sayajirao Gaekwad III, Maharaja (1875–1939)

- Diwans (complete list) –

- Bhau Shinde, Diwan (1867–1869)
- Nimbaji Rao Dhole, acting Diwan (1869–1870)
- Hariba Dada, Diwan (1870–1871)
- Gopal Rav Mairal, Diwan (1871–1872)
- Balwant Rao Bhicaji Rahurakar, Diwan (1872–1872)
- Balvantrav Khanvelkar, Diwan (1872–1873)
- Shivaji Rao Khanvelkar, Diwan (1873–1874)
- Dadabhai Naoroji, Diwan (1874–1875)
- T. Madhava Rao, Diwan (1875–1882)
- Khan Bahadur Kazi Shahabuddin, Diwan (1882–1886)
- Lakshman Jagannath Vaidya, Diwan (1886–1890)
- Manibhai Jashbhai, Diwan (1890–1895)
- S. Srinivasa Raghavaiyangar, Diwan (1895–1901)

- Barwani (complete list) –

- Mohan Singh II, Rana (1794–1839)
- Jashwant Singh, Rana (1839–1861)
- Jashwant Singh, Rana (1873–1880)
- Indrajit Singh, Rana (1880–1894)
- Ranjit Singh, Rana (1894–1930)

- Benares (complete list) –

- Udit Narayan Singh, Raja (1795–1835)
- Ishvari Prasad Narayan Singh, Raja (1835–1859), Maharaja (1859–1889)
- Prabhu Narayan Singh, Maharaja (1889–1911)

- Bharatpur (complete list) –

- Ranjit Singh, Maharaja (1776–1805)
- Randhir Singh, Maharaja (1805–1823)
- Baldeo Singh, Maharaja (1823–1825)
- Durjan Sal, usurper Maharaja (1825–1826)
- Balwant Singh, Maharaja (1825–1853)
- Jashwant Singh, Maharaja (1853–1893)
- Ram Singh, Maharaja (1893–1900)
- Giriraj Kaur, Regent (f) (1900–1918)

- Bhavnagar

- Monarchs (complete list) –

- Wakhatsinhji Akherajji, Thakur Sahib (1772–1816)
- Wajesinhji Wakhatsinhji, Thakur Sahib (1816–1852)
- Akherajji III Bhavsinhji, Thakur Sahib (1852–1854)
- Jashwantsinhji Bhavsinhji, Thakur Sahib (1854–1870)
- Takhtsinhji Jashwantsinhji, Thakur Sahib (1870–1896)
- Bhavsinhji II Takhatsinhji, Thakur Sahib (1896–1918), Maharaja Rao (1918–1919)

- Dewans (complete list) –

- Gaurishankar Udayshankar, Dewan (1846–1877)
- Samaldas Parmananddas Mehta, Dewan (1877–1884)
- Vithaldas Samaldas Mehta, Dewan (1884–1900)
- Prabhashankar Pattani, Dewan (1900–1937)

- Bhopal (complete list) –

- Wazir Mohammad Khan, Regent (1807–1816)
- Nazir Mohammad Khan, Regent (1816–1819)
- Ghous Mohammad Khan, Nawab (1807–1826)
- Qudsia Begum, Quenn (1819–1837)
- Muiz Muhammad Khan, Nawab (1826–1837)
- Jahangir Mohammad Khan, Nawab (1837–1844)
- Sikandar Begum, Nawab (1860–1868)
- Shah Jahan Begum, Nawab (1844–1860, 1868–1901)
- Jahan, Nawab (1901–1926)
- Hamidullah Khan, Nawab (1926–1949)

- Bhor (complete list) –

- Pantsachiv Chimnaji Rao II, Pant Sachiv (1798–1827)
- Pantsachiv Raghunath Rao I Chimnaji Rao, Pant Sachiv (1827–1837)
- Pantsachiv Chimnaji Rao III Raghunath Rao, Pant Sachiv (1837–1871)
- Shankarrao Chimnajirao Gandekar, Pant Sachiv (1871–1922)

- Bijawar (complete list) –

- Himmat Bahadur, usurper Raja (1793–1802)
- Keshri Singh, Raja (1802–1810)
- Ratan Singh, Raja (1811–1833)
- Lakshman Singh, Raja (1833–1847)
- Bham Pratap Singh, Raja (1847–1877)
- Bham Pratap Singh, Sawai Maharaja (1877–1899)
- Savant Singh, Sawai Maharaja (1900–1940)

- Bikaner State

- Maharajas (complete list) ––

- Surat Singh, Regent (?–1787), Maharaja (1787–1828)
- Ratan Singh, Maharaja (1828–1851)
- Sardar Singh, Maharaja (1851–1872)
- Dungar Singh, Maharaja (1872–1887)
- Ganga Singh, Maharaja (1887–1943)

- Dewans (complete list) ––

- Mohta Rao Sahib Singh Gun Roop, Dewan (1794–1805)
- Amar Chand Surana, Dewan (1805–1815)
- Mohta Bhomji, Dewan (1815–1816)
- Abhai Singh Mohta, Dewan (1816–1828)
- Hindu Mal Baid, Dewan (1828–1840s)
- Sri Narayan Singh Bhati, Dewan (c.1841)
- Sarana Shri Lakshmichand, Dewan (1844–c.1852)
- Guman Singh Baid, Dewan (1852–1853, 1854–1856, 1864–1865)
- Leeladhar Mohta + Jalam Chand Kochar, Dewan (1853–1853)
- Lachhi Ram Rakhecha, Dewan (1853–1854)
- Pandit Dojainant, Dewan (1856)
- Ram Lal Dwarkani, Dewan (1856–1863, 1865–1866)
- Man Mal Rakhecha, Dewan (1866)
- Sheo Lal Nahata, Dewan (1866)
- Fateh Chand Surana, Dewan (1867)
- Ganga Ram Purohit, Dewan (1867)
- Shah Mal Kochar, Dewan (1867)
- Man Mal Rakhecha, Dewan (1868)
- Sheo Lal Mohta, Dewan (1868)
- Lakshmi Chand Nahata, Dewan (1868)
- Visayat Hussain, Dewan (1868–1869)
- Pandit Manphool, Dewan (1869–1873)
- Lal Singh, Dewan (1873–1880s)
- Hari Singh Baid, Dewan (1880s–c.1884)
- Amin Muhammad, Dewan (1884–1888)
- Sodhi Hukam Singh, Dewan (1888–1896)
- Raghubar Singh Chauhan, Dewan (1896–1898)
- Hamidu Zafar Khan, Dewan (1898–1903)

- Bilaspur State (complete list) ––

- Mahan Chand, Raja (1778–1824)
- Kharak Chand, Raja (1824–1839)
- Jagat Chand, Raja (1839–1850)
- Hira Chand, Raja (1850–1883)
- Amar Chand, Raja (1883–1889)
- Bijai Chand, Raja (1889–1927)

- Bundi (complete list) –

- Umaid Singh, Rao Raja (1749–1770, 1773–1804)
- Bishen Singh, Rao Raja (1804–1821)
- Ram Singh, Maharao Raja (1821–1889)
- Raghubir Singh, Maharao Raja (1889–1927)

- Cambay (complete list) –

- Fath `Ali Khan, Nawab (1790–1823)
- Banda `Ali Khan, Nawab (1823–1841)
- Husayn Yawar Khan I, Nawab (1841–1880)
- Najib ad-Dawla Mumtaz al-Molk Ja`far `Ali Khan, Nawab (1880–1915)

- Chamba (complete list) –

- Sham Singh, Raja (1873–1904)
- Bhuri Singh, Raja (1904–1919)
- Ram Singh, Raja (1919–1935)
- Tikka Lakshman Singh, Raja (1935–1947)

- Charkhari (complete list) –

- Bikramajit Singh, Raja (1782–1829)
- Ratan Singh, Raja (1829–1860)
- Jai Singh Deo, Raja (1860–1880)
- Malkhan Singh, Maharaja (1880–1908)

- Chhatarpur (complete list) –

- Kunwar Sone Shah, Raja (1785–1816)
- Partab Singh, Raja (1816–1854)
- Jaghat Singh, Raja (1854–1867)
- Vishvanath Singh, Raja (1867–1895)
- Vishvanath Singh, Maharaja (1895–1932)

- Chhota Udaipur (complete list) –

- Bhimsinhji, Maharawal (1777–1822)
- Gumansinhji, Maharawal (1822–1851)
- Jitsinhji, Maharawal (1851–1881)
- Motisinhji, Maharawal (1881–1895)
- Fatehsinhji, Maharawal (1895–1923)

- Kingdom of Cochin (complete list) –

- Shaktan Thampuran, Maharaja (1790–1805)
- Rama Varma X, Maharaja (1805–1809)
- Veera Kerala Varma III, Maharaja (1809–1828)
- Rama Varma XI, Maharaja (1828–1837)
- Rama Varma XII, Maharaja (1837–1844)
- Rama Varma XIII, Maharaja (1844–1851)
- Veera Kerala Varma IV, Maharaja (1851–1853)
- Ravi Varma IV, Maharaja (1853–1864)
- Rama Varma XIV, Maharaja (1864–1888)
- Kerala Varma V, Maharaja (1888–1895)
- Rama Varma XV, Maharaja (1895–1914)

- Kingdom of Coorg (complete list) –

- Dodda Vira Rajendra, Raja (1780–1809)
- Linga Raja, Raja (1809–1820)
- Vira Raja, Raja (1820–1834)

- Cutch (complete list) ––

- Fateh Muhammad, Regent (1786–1813)
- Prithvirajji, King (1786–1801)
- Rayadhan III, King (1778–1786, 1813)
- Husain Miyan, Regent (1813–1814)
- Bharmalji II, King (1813–1819)
- Deshalji II, King (1819–1860)
- Pragmalji II, King (1860–1875)
- Khengarji III, King (1875–1942)
- Vijayaraji, King (1942–1948)
- Madansinhji, King (1948–1948)

- Danish India –
- Danta (complete list) –

- Jagatsinhji Abhaisinhji Barad Parmad, Maharana (1800–1823)
- Narsinhji Abhaisinhji Barad Parmar, Maharana (1823–1847)
- Jhalamsinhji Narsinhji Barad Parmar, Maharana (1847–1859)
- Sardarsinhji Jhalamsinhji Barad Parmar, Maharana (1859–1860)
- Harisinhji Narsinhji Barad Parmar, Maharana (1860–1876)
- Jashwantsinhji Harisinhji Barad Parmar, Maharana (1876–1908)

- Datia (complete list) –

- Shatrujit Singh, Rao (1762–1801)
- Parichhat Singh, Raja (1801–1839)
- Bijai Singh, Raja (1839–1857)
- Bhavani Singh, Raja (1857–1865)
- Bhavani Singh Bahadur, Maharaja (1865–1920)

- Dewas Junior (complete list) –

- Rukmangad Rao Puar, Raja (1790–1817)
- Anand Rao Puar "Rao Sahib", Raja (1817–1840)
- Haibat Rao Puar, Raja (1840–1864)
- Narayan Rao Puar "Dada Sahib", Raja (1864–1892)
- Malhar Rao Puar "Bhava Sahib", Raja (1892–1918)
- Yamuna Bai Sahib, Regent (1864–1877)
- Lala Bisheshas Nath, Regent (1892–1913)

- Dewas Senior (complete list) –

- Tukoji Rao II Puar, Raja (1789–1827)
- Bhawanibai Raje Sahib, Regent (f) (1827–1835)
- Rukmangad Tukoji Rao Puar, Raja (1827–1860)
- Maharani Yamunabai, Regent (f) (1860–1867)
- Krishnaji Rao II Puar, Raja (1860–1899)
- Tukoji Rao III Puar, Raja (1899–1918)

- Dhar (complete list) –

- Anand Raje II Pawar, Raja (1782–1807)
- Ramchandra Raje I Pawar, Raja (1807–1810)
- Maina Bai, Regent (f) (1807–1810)
- Ramchandra Raje II Pawar, Raja (1810–1833)
- Yeshwant Raje II Pawar, Raja (1834–1857)
- Anand Raje III Pawar, Raja (1857–1858, 1860–1898)
- Udaji Raje II Pawar, Raja (1898–1926)

- Dharampur (complete list) –

- Rupdevji, Rana (1784–1807)
- Vijaidevji I, Rana (1807–1857)
- Ramdevji III Vijayadevji, Rana (1857–1860)
- Narayandevji Ramdevji, Rana (1860–1891)
- Mohandevji Narayandevji, Rana (1891–1921)

- Dholpur (complete list) –

- Kirat Singh, Rana (1804–1806)
- Kirat Singh, Maharaja Rana (1806–1836)
- Pohap Singh, Maharaja Rana (1836–1836)
- Bhagwant Singh, Maharaja Rana (1836–1873)
- Maharani Sateha Devi, Maharaja Rana (1873–1884)
- Nihal Singh, Maharaja Rana (1873–1901)

- Dhrangadhra (complete list) –

- Jashwantsinhji II Gajsinhji, Raj Sahib (1782–1801)
- Raisinhji III Jashwantsinhji, Raj Sahib (1801–1804)
- Amarsinhji II Raisinhji, Raj Sahib (1804–1843)
- Ranmalsinhji Amarsinhji, Raj Sahib (1843–1869)
- Mansinhji II Ranmalsinhji, born, Raj Sahib (1869–1900)
- Ajitsinhji Jashwantsinhji, Raj Sahib (1900–1911)

- Dhrol (complete list) –

- Modji Nathoji, Thakur Sahib (?–1803)
- Bhuptasimhji Modji, Thakur Sahib (1803–1844)
- Jaysimhji II Bhuptasimhji, Thakur Sahib (1845–1886)
- Harisimhji Jaisimhji, Thakur Sahib (1886–1914)

- Dungarpur (complete list) ––

- Fateh Singh, Maharawal (1790–1808)
- Jaswant Singh II, Maharawal (1808–1844)
- Udai Singh II, Maharawal (1844–1898)
- Bijay Singh, Maharawal (1898–1918)

- Faridkot (complete list) –

- Charat Singh, Raja (1798–1804)
- Dal Singh, Raja (1804)
- Ghulab Singh, Raja (1804–1826)
- Attar Singh, Raja (1826–1827)
- Pahar Singh, Maharaja (1846–1849)
- Wazir Singh, Maharaja (1849–1874)
- Vikram Singh, Maharaja (1874–1898)
- Balbir Singh, Maharaja (1898–1906)

- French India –
- Garhwal (complete list) ––

- Pradyumna Shah, King (1786–1804)
- Sudarshan Shah, Maharaja (1815–1859)
- Bhawani Shah, Maharaja (1859–1871)
- Pratap Shah, Maharaja (1871–1886)
- Kirti Shah, Maharaja (1886–1913)

- Gondal (complete list) –

- Devaji Sagramji, Thakur (1800–1812)
- Nathuji Devaji, Thakur (1812–1814)
- Kanuji Devaji, Thakur (1814–1821)
- Chandrasimhji Devaji, Thakur (1821–1841)
- Bhanabhai Devaji, Thakur (1841–1851)
- Sagramji II Devaji, Thakur (1851–1866)
- Sagramji II Devaji, Thakur Sahib (1866–1869)
- W. Scott, Regent (1878–1882)
- Jayashankar Lalshankar, Regent (1878–1882)
- Hancock, acting Regent (1880–1881)
- Nutt, Regent (1881–1884)
- Bhagvat Sinhji, Regent (1882–1884)
- Bhagwatsimhji Sagramsimhji, Thakur Sahib (1869–1944)

- Gwalior State: Scindia (complete list) –

- Daulat Rao Sindhia, Maharaja (1794–1827)
- Baiza Bai, Regent (f) (1827)
- Regent (f) (1827–1832)
- Jankoji Rao Scindia II, Maharaja (1827–1843)
- Tara Bai, Regent (f) (1843–1844)
- Jayajirao Scindia, Maharaja (1843–1886)
- Sakhya Bai, Regent (f) (1886–1894)
- Madho Rao Scindia, Maharaja (1886–1925)

- Hyderabad

- Nizam (complete list) –

- Ali Khan, Nizam (1762–1803)
- Sikandar Jah, Nizam (1803–1829)
- Nasir-ud-Daulah, Nizam (1829–1857)
- Afzal-ud-Daulah, Nizam (1857–1869)
- Mahboob Ali Khan, Nizam (1869–1911)

- Prime ministers (complete list) –

- Arastu Jah, Prime minister (1797–1804)
- Raja Rajindra, Prime minister (1804)
- Mir Alam, Prime minister (1804–1808)
- Chandu Lal, Prime minister (1808–?, 1832–1843)
- Munir ul-Mulk, Prime minister (?–1832)
- Ram Baksh, Prime minister (1843–1846)
- Siraj ul-Mulk, Prime minister (1846–1848, 1851–1853)
- Amjad ul-Mulk, Prime minister (1848–1848)
- Shams ul-Umara, Prime minister (1848–1849)
- Ram Baksh, Prime minister (1849–1851)
- Ganesh Rao, Prime minister (1851–1851)
- Mir Turab Ali Khan, Salar Jung I, Prime minister (1853–1883)
- Mir Laiq Ali Khan, Salar Jung II, Prime minister (1883–1887)
- Bashir-ud-Daula Asman Jah, Prime minister (1887–1893)
- Viqar-ul-Umra, Prime minister (1893–1901)
- Kishen Pershad, Prime minister (1901–1912, 1926–1937)

- Idar (complete list) –

- Anandasinghe Saheb Bahadur, Raja (1831–1838), Maharaja (1838–1853)
- Shivsinghji Anandsinghji Saheb Bahadur, Maharaja (1853–1891)
- Bhabanisingji Shibsingji Saheb Bahadur, Maharaja (1891)
- Gambhirsingji Bhabanisingji Saheb Bahadur, Maharaja (1891–1833)
- Jivansingji Gambhirsingji Saheb Bahadur, Maharaja (1833–?)
- Kesharisingji Jibansingji Saheb Bahadur, Maharaja (?–1901)

- Indore: Holkar (complete list) –

- Yashwantrao Holkar, Maharaja (1798–1811)

- Maharajas (complete list) –

- Maharani Tulsi Bai, Regent (f) (1811–1817)
- Malhar Rao Holkar II, Maharaja (1811–1833)
- Marthand Rao Holkar, Maharaja (1833–1834)
- Hari Rao Holkar, Maharaja (1834–1843)
- Maharani Maji, Regent (f) (1843–1844)
- Khande Rao Holkar II, Maharaja (1843–1844)
- Maharani Maji, Regent (f) (1844–1849)
- Tukojirao Holkar II, Maharaja (1844–1886)
- Shivajirao Holkar, Maharaja (1886–1903)

- Diwans (complete list) –

- Bala Ram Seth, Diwan (c.1808–1811)
- Ganpal Rao, Diwan (1811–1817)
- Tantia Jogh, Diwan (1818–1826)
- Raoji Trimbak, Diwan (1826–c.1827)
- Daji Bakhshi, Diwan (1827)
- Appa Rao Krishna, Diwan (c.1827–1829)
- Madhav Rao Phadnis, Diwan (1829–c.1834)
- Sardar Revaji Rao Phanse, Diwan (1834–1836)
- Abbaji Ballal, Diwan (1836–c.1839)
- Bhao Rao Phanse, Diwan (c.1839–c.1840)
- Narayan Rao Palshikar, Diwan (c.1840–1841)
- Bhao Rao Phanse, Diwan (c.1842–1848)
- Ram Rao Palshikar, Diwan (1848–c.1849)
- T. Madhava Rao, Diwan (1873–1875)
- R. Raghunatha Rao, Diwan (1875–1881, 1886–1888)
- Shahamat Ali, Diwan (c.1881–c.1884)
- Nana Moroji Trilokekar, Diwan (1884–1886)
- Balkrishna Atmaram Gupte, Diwan (c.1890s)
- Shri Rai Bhadhur Nanak Chand Ji Airen, Prime Minister (1890–1913)

- British Residents

- Claude Martin Wade, British Resident (1840–1844)
- Robert North Collie Hamilton, British Resident (1845–1859)
- Richmond Campbell Shakespear, British Resident (1859–1861)
- Richard John Meade, British Resident (1861–1869)
- Henry D. Daly, British Resident (1869–1881)
- Henry Lepel-Griffin, British Resident (1881–1888)
- P.F. Henvey, British Resident (1888–1890)
- R.J. Crosthwaite, British Resident (1890–1894)
- David W.K. Barr, British Resident (1894–1899)
- Robert Henry Jennings, British Resident (1899–1902)

- British Agents

- Robert North Collie Hamilton, British Agent (1845–1854)
- David W.K. Barr, British Agent (1899–1900)
- Charles S. Bayley, British Agent (1900–1905)

- Jaipur State (complete list) –

- Pratap Singh of Jaipur, King (1778–1803)
- Jagat Singh II, King (1803–1818)

subsidiary to the British Raj from 1818

- Mohan Singh, Regent (1818–1819)
- Jai Singh III, Maharaja (1818–1835)
- Ram Singh II, Maharaja (1835–1880)
- Madho Singh II, Maharaja (1880–1922)

- Jaisalmer

- Maharawals (complete list) ––

- Mulraj II, Maharawal (1762–1820)
- Gaj Singh, Maharawal (1820–1846)
- Ranjit Singh of Jaisalmer, Maharawal (1846–1864)
- Bairi Sal, Maharawal (1864–1891)
- Shalivahan Singh III, Maharawal (1891–1914)

- Dewans (complete list) ––

- Mohata Nathmal, Dewan (c.1885–1891)
- Mehta Jagjiwan, Dewan (c.1890–1903)
- HH Shri Panna Lal Ji Soni Nathani, Dewan (c.1892–1902), acting Dewan (c.1930–1932)
- Thakur Kushal Singh, acting Dewan (1890s–1900)
- Rawatmal Purohit Khetrapaliya, acting Dewan (1900)

- Jammu and Kashmir (complete list) –

- Gulab Singh, Maharaja (1846–1857)
- Ranbir Singh, Maharaja (1857–1885)
- Pratap Singh, Maharaja (1885–1925)

- Janjira (complete list) –

- Jumrud Khan, Wazir (1794–1803)
- Ibrahim Khan II, Nawab (1803–1826)
- Mohammad Khan I, Nawab (1826–1848)
- Ibrahim Khan III, Nawab (1848–1879)
- Regent (1879–1883)
- Ahmad Khan, Nawab (1879–1922)

- Jaora (complete list) –

- Abdul Ghafur Mohammad Khan, Nawab (1817–1825)
- Musharraf Begum, Regent (f) (1825–1827)
- Borthwick, Regent (1827–1840)
- Ghows Mohammad Khan, Nawab (1825–1865)
- Hazrat Nur Khan, Regent (1865–1872)
- Mohammad Ismail, Nawab (1865–1895)
- Fakhr al-Dowla Mohammad Iftekhar, Nawab (1895–1947)

- Jawhar (complete list) –

- Vikramshah III Patangshah Mukne, Raja (1798–1821)
- Patangshah III Vikramshah Mukne, Raja (1821–1865)
- Vikramshah IV Patangshah Mukne, Raja (1865–1865)
- Patangshah IV Vikramshah Mukne, Raja (1865–1905)

- Jhabua (complete list) –

- Bhim Singh, Raja (1770–1821)
- Pratap Singh, Raja (1821–1832)
- Ratan Singh, Raja (1832–1840)
- Gopal Singh, Raja (1841–1895)
- Udai Singh, Raja (1895–1942)

- Jhalawar (complete list) –

- Madan Singh, Maharaja (1838–1845)
- Prithvi Singh, Maharaja (1845–1875)
- Regent (1875–1884)
- Zalim Singh, Maharaja (1875–1896)
- Bhawani Singh, Maharaja (1899–1929)

- Jind (complete list) –

- Bhag Singh, Raja (1789–1819)
- Rani Sobrahi Kaur, Regent (f) (1813–1814)
- Fateh Singh, Regent (f) (1814–1819)
- Fateh Singh, Raja (1819–1822)
- Rani Mai Sahib Kaur, Regent (f) (1822–1827, 1834–1837)
- Sangat Singh, Raja (1822–1834)
- Sarup Singh, Raja (1837–1864)
- Raghubir Singh, Raja (1864–1887)
- Regent (1887–1899)
- Ranbir Singh, Raja (1887–1911), Maharaja (1911–1947)

- Jodhpur State (complete list) ––

- Bhim Singh, Maharaja (1793–1803)
- Man Singh, Maharaja (1803–1843)
- Takht Singh, Maharaja (1843–1873)
- Jaswant Singh II, Maharaja (1873–1895)
- Sardar Singh, Maharaja (1895–1911)

- Junagadh (complete list) –

- Muhammad Hamid Khanji, Nawab (1774–1811)
- Muhammad Bahadur Khanji II, Nawab (1811–1840)
- Muhammad Hamid Khanji II, Nawab (1840–1851)
- Muhammad Mahabat Khanji II, Nawab (1838–1882)
- Muhammad Bahadur Khanji III, Nawab (1856–1892)
- Muhammad Rasul Khanji Babi, Nawab (1892–1911)

- Kalahandi (complete list) –

- Jugasai Deo IV, Raja (1796–1831)
- Fateh Narayan Deo, Raja (1831–1853)
- Udit Pratap Deo, Raja (1853–1881)
- Raghu Kesari Deo, Raja (1881–1897)
- Brij Mohan Deo, Raja (1897–1926), Maharaja (1926–1939)

- Kapurthala (complete list) –

- Bagh Singh, Sardar (1783–1801)
- Fateh Singh, Raja (1801–1837)
- Nihal Singh, Raja (1837–1852)
- Randhir Singh, Raja (1852–1861), Raja-i Rajgan (1861–1870)
- Kharak Singh, Raja-i Rajgan (1870–1877)
- Jagatjit Singh, Raja-i Rajgan (1877–1911), Maharaja (1911–1947)

- Karauli (complete list) –

- Manak Pal, Maharaja (1772–1804)
- Amola Pal, Maharaja (1804–1805)
- Herbaksh Pal, Maharaja (1805–1837)
- Pratap Pal, Maharaja (1837–1849)
- Narsingh Pal, Maharaja (1849–1852)
- Bharat Pal, Maharaja (1852–1854)
- Madan Pal, Maharaja (1854–1869)
- Lakshman Pal, Maharaja (1869)
- Vrishbhan Singh Tanwar, Regent (1869–1871)
- Jaisingh Pal, Maharaja (1869–1875)
- Bhanwar Pal, Maharaja (1886–1927)
- Arjun Pal II, Maharaja (1876–1886)
- Bhanwar Pal, Maharaja (1886–1927)

- Khilchipur (complete list) –

- Durjan Sal, Dewan (1795–1819)
- Balwant Singh, Dewan (1819)
- Shir Singh, Dewan (1819–1868)
- Amar Singh, Dewan (1868–1870), Rao Bahadur (1870–1873)
- Amar Singh, Rao Bahadur (1873–1899)
- Bhawani Singh, Rao Bahadur (1899–1908)

- Kishangarh (complete list) –

- Kalyan Singh, Maharaja (1798–1839)
- Mohkam Singh, Maharaja (1839–1841)
- Prithvi Singh, Maharaja (1841–1879)
- Sardul Singh, Maharaja (1879–1900)
- Madan Singh, Maharaja (1900–1926)

- Kolhapur (complete list) –

- Shivaji I, Raja (1762–1813)
- Sambhaji III, Raja (1813–1821)
- Shivaji II, Raja (1821–1822)
- Shahaji, Regent (1821–1822), Raja (1822–1838)
- Shivaji III, Raja (1838–1866)
- Sai Bai, Regent (1838–1845)
- Rajaram I, Raja (1866–1870)
- Tara Bai, Regent (f) (1870–1871)
- Shivaji IV, Raja (1871–1883)
- Anand Bai, Regent (f) (1883–1884)
- Jaisinhrao Ghatge, Regent (1884–1885)
- Shahu, Raja (1884–1900), Maharaja (1900–1922)

- Kota (complete list) –

- Umaid Singh I, Maharao (1771–1819)
- Kishor Singh II, Maharao (1819–1828)
- Ram Singh II, Maharao (1828–1866)
- Chhatar Sal Singh II, Maharao (1866–1889)
- Regent (1889–1896)
- Umed Singh II, Maharao (1889–1940)

- Kothi State (complete list) –

- Lal Duniyapati Singh, Rais (1790-1829)
- Lal Madhav Singh, Rais (1829-1852)
- Lal Abdhut Singh, Rais (1852-1862)
- Lal Ran Bahadur Singh, Rais (1862-1887)
- Bhagwat Bahadur Singh Ju Deo, Raja Bahadur (1887-1895)
- Avadhendra Singh Ju Deo, Raja Bahadur (1895-1914)

- Limbdi (complete list) –

- Harisinhji Harbhanj, Thakur Sahib (1786–1825)
- Bhojraji Harisinhji, Thakur Sahib (1825–1837)
- Harbhamji II Bhojraji, Thakur Sahib (1837–1856)
- Fatehsinhji Bhojraji, Thakur Sahib (1856–1862)
- Rani Shri Hariba Kunverba, Regent (f) (1862–1877)
- Jashwantsinhji Fatehsinhji, Thakur Sahib (1862–1907)

- Loharu (complete list) –

- Ahmad Bakhsh Khan, Nawab (1806–1827)
- Sams-ud-din Khan, Nawab (1827–1835)
- Aminuddin Ahmad Khan, Nawab (1835–1869)
- Allauddin Ahmad Khan, Nawab (1869–1884)
- Amiruddin Ahmad Khan, Nawab (1884–1920)

- Lunavada (complete list) –

- Partab Singh, Rana (1786–1818)
- Fateh Singh, Rana (1818–1849)
- Dalpat Singh, Rana (1849–1851)
- interregnum, Rana (1851–1852)
- Dalil Singh, Rana (1852–1867)
- Wakhat Singh Dalil Singh, Rana (1867–1929)

- Maihar (complete list) –

- Raghubir Singh, Raja (1869–1908)
- Jagubir Singh, Raja (1908–1910)
- Randhir Singh, Raja (1910–1911)
- Brijnath Singh Ju Deo, Raja (1911–1968)
- Govind Singh, Raja (1968–?)

- Malerkotla (complete list) –

- Khan Ataullah Khan, Nawab (1784–1809)
- Muhammad Wazir `Ali Khan, Nawab (1809–1821)
- Amir `Ali Khan Bahadur, Nawab (1821–1846)
- Mahbub `Ali Khan Bahadur, Nawab (1846–1857)
- Eskandar `Ali Khan Bahadur, Nawab (1857–1871)
- Mohammad Ebrahim `Ali Khan, Nawab (1871–1908)

- Mandi (complete list) –

- Ishwari Sen, Raja (1788–1826)
- Zalim Sen, Raja (1826–1839)
- Balbir Sen, Raja (1839–1851)
- Bijai Sen, Raja (1851–1902)
- Bhawani Sen, Raja (1902–1912)

- Maratha Empire (complete list) –

- Shahu II, Chhatrapati (1777–1808)
- Pratap Singh, Chhatrapati (1808–1818), Raja (1808–1839)

- Mayurbhanj (complete list) –

- Rani Sumitra Devi, Regent (1796–1810)
- Rani Jamuna Devi, Regent (1810–1813)
- Tribikram Bhanj Deo, Raja (1813–1822)
- Jadunath Bhanj Deo, Raja (1822–1863)
- Shrinath Bhanj Deo, Raja (1863–1868)
- Krishnachandra Bhanj Deo, Raja (1868–1882)
- Regent (1882–1892)
- Sriram Chandra Bhanj Deo, Raja (1882–1910)

- Morvi (complete list) –

- Jyaji Waghji, Thakur Sahib (1790–1828)
- Prithirajji Jyaji, Thakur Sahib (1828–1846)
- Rawaji II Prithirajji, Thakur Sahib (1846–1870)
- Shambhuprasad Laxmilal, Regent (1870–1879)
- Jhunjhabai Sakhidas, Regent (1870–1870s)
- Waghji II Rawaji, Thakur Sahib (1870–1922)

- Mudhol (complete list) –

- Malojirao III Raje Ghorpade, Raja (1737–1805)
- Narayanrao Raje Ghorpade, Raja (1805–1816)
- Govindrao Raje Ghorpade, Raja (1816–1818)
- Vyankatrao I Raje Ghorpade, Raja (1818–1854)
- Balwantrao Raje Ghorpade, Raja (1854–1862)
- Regent (1862–1882)
- Vyankatrao II Raje Ghorpade, Raja (1862–1900)
- Regency (1900–1904)
- Malojirao IV Raje Ghorpade, Raja (1900–1939)

- Mughal Empire (complete list) –

- Shah Alam II, Emperor (1759–1806)
- Akbar Shah II, Emperor (1806–1837)
- Bahadur Shah Zafar, Emperor (1837–1857)

- Princely State of Mysore (complete list) ––

- Krishnaraja Wodeyar III, Maharaja (1799–1868)
- Chamarajendra Wadiyar X, Maharaja (1868–1894)
- Kempa Nanjammani Vani Vilasa Sannidhana, Regent (1894–1902)
- Krishna Raja Wadiyar IV, Maharaja (1894–1940)

- Nabha (complete list) –

- Bhagwan Singh, Raja (1842–1871)
- Hira Singh Nabha, Maharaja (1871–1911)

- Nagod (complete list) –

- Lal Sheoraj Singh, Raja (1780–1818)
- Balbhadra Singh, Raja (1818–1831)
- Raghubindh Singh, Raja (1831–1874)
- Jadubindh Singh, Raja (1874–1922)

- Nagpur kingdom (complete list) –

- Raghoji II, King (1788–1816, 1816–1818)
- Raghoji III, King (1818–1853)

- Narsinghgarh (complete list) –

- Hanwant Singh, Raja (1872–1873)
- Pratap Singh, Raja (1873–1890)
- Mahtab Singh, Raja (1890–1896)
- Arjun Singh, Raja (1896–1924)

- Nawanagar (complete list) –

- Jasaji Lakhaji, Jam Saheb (1767–1814)
- Sataji ll Lakhaji, Jam Saheb (1814–1820)
- Ranmalji Sataji ll, Jam Saheb (1820–1852)
- Vibhaji II Ranmalji, Jam Saheb (1852–1895)
- Jashwantsinhji Vibhaji II, Jam Saheb (1895–1906)

- Orchha (complete list) –

- Vikramajit Mahendra, Raja (1776–1817)
- Dharam Pal, Raja (1817–1834)
- Taj Singh, Raja (1834–1842)
- Surjain Singh, Raja (1842–1848)
- Hamir Singh, Raja (1848–1865), Maharaja (1865–1874)
- Pratap Singh, Maharaja (1874–1930)

- Oudh (complete list) –

- Saadat Ali Khan II, Nawab (1798–1814)
- Ghazi-ud-Din Haider, Nawab (1814–1827)
- Nasiruddin Haider, Nawab (1827–1837)
- Muhammad Ali Shah, Nawab (1837–1842)
- Amjad Ali Shah, Nawab (1842–1847)
- Wajid Ali Shah, Nawab (1847–1856)
- Birjis Qadra, Nawab (1856–1858)

- Palanpur (complete list) –

- Firuz Khan III, Diwan (1794–1812)
- Fateh Mohammad Khan, Diwan (1812–1813)
- Shamshir Mohammad Khan, Diwan (1813–1813)
- Fateh Mohammad Khan (2nd time), Diwan (1813–1854)
- Zorawar Khan, Diwan (1854–1878)
- Zobdat al-Molk Shir Mohammad Khan, Diwan (1878–1910), Nawab (1910–1918)

- Palitana (complete list) –

- Undaji, Thakur Sahib (1770–1820)
- Kandhaji IV, Thakur Sahib (1820–1840)
- Nonghanji IV, Thakur Sahib (1840–1860)
- Pratapsinghji, Thakur Sahib (1860)
- Sursinhji, Thakur Sahib (1860–1885)
- Mansinhji Sursinhji, Thakur Sahib (1885–1905)

- Panna (complete list) –

- Kishor Singh, Raja (1798–1834)
- Harbans Rai, Raja (1834–1849)
- Nirpat Singh, Raja (1849–1869)
- Nirpat Singh, Maharaja (1869–1870)
- Rudra Pratap Singh, Maharaja (1870–1893)
- Lokpal Singh, Maharaja (1893–1898)
- Madho Singh, Maharaja (1898–1902)

- Patiala (complete list) –

- Sahib Singh, Maharaja (1810–1813)
- Maharani Aus Kaur, Regent (f) (1813–1823)
- Karam Singh, Maharaja (1813–1845)
- Narendra Singh, Maharaja (1845–1862)
- Jagdish Singh, Regent (1862–1870)
- Mahendra Singh, Maharaja (1862–1876)
- Deva Singh, Regent (1876–1890)
- Rajinder Singh, Maharaja (1876–1900)
- Sardar Gurmukh Singh, Regent (1900–1910)
- Bhupinder Singh, Maharaja (1900–1938)

- Patna (complete list) –

- Kishor Singh, Raja (1798–1834)
- Harbans Rai, Raja (1834–1849)
- Nirpat Singh, Raja (1849–1869), Maharaja (1869–1870)
- Rudra Pratap Singh, Maharaja (1870–1893)
- Lokpal Singh, Maharaja (1893–1898)
- Madho Singh, Maharaja (1898–1902)

- Porbandar (complete list) –

- Sartanji II Vikmatji, Rana (1757–1813)
- Haloji Sultanji, Regent (1804–1812)
- Khimojiraj Haloji, Rana (1813–1831)
- Rani Rupaliba Kunverba, Regent (1831–1841)
- Vikramatji Khimojiraj, Rana (1831–1900)
- Bhavsinhji Madhavsinhji, Rana (1900–1908)

- Pratapgarh (complete list) –

- Sawant Singh, Maharawat (1775–1844)
- Dalpat Singh, Maharawat (1844–1864)
- Udai Singh, Maharawat (1864–1890)
- Raghunath Singh, Maharawat (1890–1929)

- Pudukkottai

- Kings (complete list) –

- Vijaya Raghunatha Tondaiman, King (1789–1807)
- Vijaya Raghunatha Raya Tondaiman II, King (1807–1825)
- Raghunatha Tondaiman, King (1825–1839)
- Ramachandra Tondaiman, King (1839–1886)
- Martanda Bhairava Tondaiman, King (1886–1928)

- Diwans (complete list) –

- A. Seshayya Sastri, Diwan (1878–1894)
- R. Vedantacharlu, Diwan (1894–1899)
- S. Venkataramadas Nayudu, Diwan (1899–1909)

- Radhanpur (complete list) –

- Muhammad Ghazi ad-Din Khan, Nawab (1787–1813)
- Muhammad Shir Khan I, Nawab (1813–1825)
- Muhammad Kamal ad-Din Khan II, Nawab (1813–1813)
- Sardar Bibi Sahiba, Regent (f) (1825–1838)
- Muhammad Jorawar Shir Khan, Nawab (1825–1874)
- Mohammad Bismillah Khan, Nawab (1874–1895)
- Mohammad Shir Khan II, Nawab (1895–1910)
- W. Beale, Regent (1895–1896)
- Malcolm Thomas Lyde, Regent (1896–1900)
- George Broodric O, Regent (1900–1901)

- Rajgarh (complete list) –

- Pratap Singh, Rawat (1790–1803)
- Prithvi Singh, Rawat (1803–1815)
- Newal Singh, Rawat (1815–1831)
- Rawat Moti Singh, Rawat (1831–1872)
- Thakur Khok Singh, Rawat (1846–1847)
- Mohammad `Abd al-Wasih Khan, Nawab (1872–1880)
- Bakhtawar Singh, Rawat (1880–1882)
- Balbhadra Singh, Rawat (1882–1886), Raja (1886–1902)

- Rajkot (complete list) –

- Ranmalji II Mehramamji, Thakur Sahib (1795–1825)
- Surajji Ranmalji, Thakur Sahib (1825–1844)
- Mehramamji IV Surajji, Thakur Sahib (1844–1862)
- Thakurani Bai Shri Naniba, Regent (f) (1862–1867)
- J.H. Lloyd, Regent (1867–1876)
- Bawajiraj Mehrmansinhji, Thakur Sahib (1862–1890)
- Regent (1890–1907)
- Lakhajiraj III Bawajiraj, Thakur Sahib (1890–1930)

- Rajpipla State (complete list) ––

- Ajabsinhji, Maharana (1786–1803)
- Naharsinhji, Regent (1793–1803)
- Ramsinhji, Maharana (1803–1810)
- Naharsinhji, Maharana (1810–1821)
- Verisalji II, Maharana (1821–1860)
- Gambhirsinhji II, Maharana (1860–1897)
- William Arthur Salmon, British administrator (1884–1885)
- Edward Vincent Stace, British administrator (1885–1886)
- Alexander Francis Maconochie, British administrator (1886–1887)
- Alexander Shewan, British administrator (1887–1894)
- Willoughby Pitcairn Kennedy, British administrator (1894–1895)
- Francis William Snell, Maharana (1895–1897)
- Chhatrasinhji, Maharana (1897–1915)
- Vijayasinhji Chhatrasinhji (1915-1948)

- Ramnad estate (complete list) –

- Mangaleswari Nachiyar, King (1795–1803)
- Mangaleswari Nachiyar, Zamindar (1803–1807)
- Annaswami Sethupathi, Zamindar (1807–1820)
- Ramaswami Sethupathi, Zamindar (1820–1830)
- Muthu Chella Thevar Sethupathi, Zamindar (1830–1846)
- Parvatha Vardhani Ammal Nachchiyar, Zamindar (1846–1862)
- Muthuramalinga Sethupathi II, Zamindar (1862–1873)
- Court of Wards, Zamindar (1873–1889)
- Bhaskara Sethupathy, Zamindar (1889–1903)

- Rampur (complete list) –

- Ahmad Ali Khan Bahadur, Nawab (1794–1840)
- Nasrullah Khan, Regent (1794–1811)
- Muhammad Said Khan Bahadur, Nawab (1840–1855)
- Yusef Ali Khan Bahadur, Nawab (1855–1865)
- Kalb Ali Khan Bahadur, Nawab (1865–1887)
- Muhammad Mushtaq Ali Khan Bahadur, Nawab (1887–1889)
- Regency (1889–1894)
- Hamid Ali Khan Bahadur, Nawab (1889–1930)

- Ratlam (complete list) –

- Parbat Singh, Raja (1800–1825)
- Balwant Singh, Raja (1825–1857)
- Borthwick, Regent (1825–c.1832)
- Bhairon Singh, Raja (1857–1864)
- Ranjit Singh, Raja (1864–1893)
- Regency (1893–1898)
- Sajjan Singh, Raja (1893–1921), Maharaja (1893–1947)

- Rewa (complete list) ––

- Ajit Singh, Maharaja (1755–1809)
- Jai Singh, Maharaja (1809–1835)
- Vishwanath Singh, Maharaja (1835–1854)
- Raghuraj Singh of Rewa, Majaraja (1854–1880)
- Venkatraman Ramanuj Prasad Singh, Maharaja (1880–1918)

- Sachin (complete list) –

- Abdul Karim Mohammad Yakut Khan I, Nawab (1791–1802)
- Ibrahim Mohammad Yakut Khan I, Nawab (1802–1853)
- Abdul Karim Mohammad Yakut Khan II, Nawab (1853–1868)
- Ibrahim Mohammad Yakut Khan II, Nawab (1868–1873)
- Regent (1873–1886)
- Abdul Kadir Khan, Nawab (1873–1887)
- Regent (1887–1907)
- Ibrahim Mohammad Yakut Khan III, Nawab (1887–1930)

- Sailana (complete list) –

- Lakshman Singh, Raja (1797–1826)
- Ratan Singh, Raja (1826–1827)
- Nahar Singh, Raja (1827–1841)
- Takhat Singh, Raja (1841–1850)
- Rajmata Nath Kanwarji, Regent (1850–1859)
- Duleh Singh, Raja (1850–1895)
- Jashwant Singh II, Raja (1895–1919)

- Samthar (complete list) –

- Ranjit Singh II, Raja (1817–1827)
- Hindupat Singh, Raja (1827–1864)
- Regent (1858–1865)
- Chhatar Singh, Raja (1865–1877)
- Chhatar Singh, Maharaja (1877–1896)
- Bir Singh, Maharaja (1896–1935)

- Sangli (complete list) –

- Gangadharrao, Regent (1782–1801)
- Chintaman I, Rao (1782–1851)
- Regent (1851–1860)
- Dhundi Rao Chintaman, Rao (1851–1901)

- Sant (complete list) –

- Bhawanisinhji Kalyansinhji, Maharana (?–1872)
- Pratapsinhji Bhawanisinhji, Maharana (1872–1896)
- Jorawarsinhji Pratapsinhji, Maharana (1896–1946)

- Sawantwadi (complete list) –

- Khem Savant III, Raja Bahadur (1763–1803)
- Rani Lakshmi Bai, Regent (f) (1803–1805)
- Ramachandra Savant II Bhau Saheb, Raja Bahadur (1805–1807)
- Phond Savant II, Raja Bahadur (1807–1808)
- Rani Durga Bai, Regent (f) (1807–1808)
- Phond Savant III, Raja Bahadur (1808–1812)
- Rani Durga Bai, Regent (f) (1812–1818)
- Rani Savitri Bai Raje (f), Regent (f) (1818–1823)
- Rani Narmada Bai, Regent (f) (1818–1823)
- Khem Savant IV Bapu Saheb, Raja Bahadur (1812–1867)
- Phond Savant IV Bapu Saheb, Raja Bahadur (1867–1869)
- Regent (1869–c.1880)
- Raghunath Savant Baba Saheb, Raja Bahadur (1869–1899)
- Regent (1899–1900)
- Shriram Savant Aba Saheb, Raja Bahadur (1899–1913)

- Shahpura (complete list) –

- Regent (1796–c.1802)
- Amar Singh, Raja Dhiraj (1796–1827)
- Madho Singh, Raja Dhiraj (1827–1845)
- Jagat Singh, Raja Dhiraj (1845–1853)
- Rani Khangarotji, Regent (1845–?)
- Mertaniji, Regent (f) (1853–1876)
- Lakshman Singh, Raja Dhiraj (1853–1869)
- Nahar Singh, Raja Dhiraj (1870–1932)

- Sirmur (complete list) –

- Karam Prakash II, Raja (1793–1803)
- Ratan Prakash, Raja (1803–1804)
- Karma Prakash II, Raja (1804–1815)
- Fateh Prakash, Raja (1815–1850)
- Raghbir Prakash, Raja (1850–1856)
- Shamsher Prakash, Raja (1856–1898)
- Surendra Bikram Prakash, Raja (1898–1911)

- Sirohi (complete list) –

- Verisalji II, Rao (1782–1808)
- Udaibhan Singh, Rao (1808–1847)
- Regent (1819–1847)
- Sheo Singh, Rao (1819–1862)
- Regent (1861–1862)
- Umaid Singh II, Rao (1861–1875)
- Keshri Singh, Rao (1875–1889), Maharao (1889–1920)

- Sisodia (complete list) –

- Bhim Singh, Rajput (1778–1828)
- Jawan Singh, Rajput (1828–1838)
- Shambhu Singh, Rajput (1861–1874)
- Sajjan Singh, Rajput (1874–1884)
- Fateh Singh, Rajput (1884–1930)

- Sitamau (complete list) –

- Fateh Singh, Raja (1752–1802)
- Raj Ram Singh I, Raja (1802–1867)
- Bhawani Singh, Raja (1867–1885)
- Bahadur Singh, Raja (1885–1899)
- Shardul Singh, Raja (1899–1900)
- Raj Ram Singh II, Raja (1900–1947)

- Sonepur (complete list) –

- Prithvi Singh Deo, Raja (1786–1841)
- Rani Laxmipriya Devi, Regent (1802–1822)
- Bapu Dalpat Rai, Regent (1841–1847)
- Rani Gundicha Devi, Regent (f) (1847–1855)
- Niladhar Singh Deo, Raja (1841–1891)
- Pratap Rudra Singh, Raja (1891–1902)

- Suket (complete list) –

- Bikram Sen II, Raja (1791–1838)
- Ugar Sen II, Raja (1838–1876)
- Rudra Sen, Raja (1876–1878)
- Arimardan Sen, Raja (1878–1879)
- Munshi Hardyal Singh, Regent (1879–1884)
- Dasht Nikandan Sen, Raja (1879–1908)

- Tonk (complete list) –

- Amir Khan, Nawab (1806–1834)
- Muhammad Wazir Khan, Nawab (1834–1864)
- Muhammad Ali Khan, Nawab (1864–1867)
- Ibrahim Ali Khan, Nawab (1867–1930)

- Travancore

- Maharajas (complete list) –

- Balarama Varma, Maharaja (1798–1810)
- Gowri Lakshmi Bayi, Maharaja (1810–1815)
- Gowri Parvati Bayi, Maharaja (1815–1829)
- Swathi Thirunal, Maharaja (1829–1846)
- Uthram Thirunal, Maharaja (1846–1860)
- Ayilyam Thirunal, Maharaja (1860–1880)
- Visakham Thirunal, Maharaja (1880–1885)
- Moolam Thirunal, Maharaja (1885–1924)

- Diwans (complete list) –

- Velu Thampi Dalawa, Dalawa (1799–1809)
- Oommini Thampi, Dalawa (1809–1811)
- Col. John Munro, Dewan (1811–1814)
- Devan Padmanabhan Menon, Dewan (1814–1814)
- Bappu Rao, acting Dewan (1814–1815)
- Sanku Annavi Pillai, Dewan (1815–1815)
- Raman Menon, Dewan (1815–1817)
- Reddy Rao, Dewan (1817–1821)
- T. Venkata Rao, Dewan (1821–1830)
- Thanjavur Subha Rao, Dewan (1830–1837)
- T. Ranga Rao, acting Dewan (1837–1838)
- T. Venkata Rao, Dewan (1838–1839)
- Thanjavur Subha Rao, Dewan (1839–1842)
- Krishna Rao, acting Dewan (1842–1843)
- Reddy Rao (again), Dewan (1843–1845)
- Srinivasa Rao (acting), Dewan (1845–1846)
- Krishna Rao, Dewan (1846–1858)
- T. Madhava Rao, Dewan (1857–1872)
- A. Seshayya Sastri, Dewan (1872–1877)
- Nanoo Pillai, Dewan (1877–1880)
- V. Ramiengar, Dewan (1880–1887)
- T. Rama Rao, Dewan (1887–1892)
- S. Shungrasoobyer, Dewan (1892–1898)
- K. Krishnaswamy Rao, Dewan (1898–1904)

- Tripura: Manikya dynasty (complete list) ––

- Rajdhar Manikya II, Maharaja (1785–1806)
- Rama Ganga Manikya, Maharaja (1806–1809, 1813–1826)
- Durga Manikya, Maharaja (1809–1813)
- Kashi Chandra Manikya, Maharaja (1826–1829)
- Krishna Kishore Manikya, Maharaja (1829–1849)
- Ishan Chandra Manikya, Maharaja (1849–1862)
- Bir Chandra Manikya, Maharaja (1862–1896)
- Radha Kishore Manikya, Maharaja (1896–1909)

- Udaipur State (complete list) ––

- Bhim Singh, Maharana (1778–1828)
- Jawan Singh, Maharana (1828–1838)
- Sardar Singh, Maharana (1838–1842)
- Swarup Singh, Maharana (1842–1861)
- Shambhu Singh, Maharana (1861–1874)
- Sajjan Singh, Maharana (1874–1884)
- Fateh Singh, Maharana (1884–1930)

- Wadhwan (complete list) –

- Prithirajji Chandrasinhji, Thakur Sahib (1778–1807)
- Jalamsinhji Prithirajji, Thakur Sahib (1807–1827)
- Raisinhji Jalamsinhji, Thakur Sahib (1827–1875)
- Dajiraji Chandrasinhji, Thakur Sahib (1875–1885)
- Balsinhji Chandrasinhji, Thakur Sahib (1885–1910)

- Wankaner (complete list) –

- Chandrasinhji II Kesarisinhji, Maharana Raj Shri (1787–1839)
- Vakhatsinhji Chandrasinhji, Maharana Raj Shri (1839–1860)
- Regent (1860–1861)
- Banesinhji Jaswantsihnji, Maharana Raj Shri (1860–1881)
- Amarsinhji Banesinhji, Maharana Raj Shri (1881–1947)
- Ganpatrao Narayen Laud, Maharana Raj Shri (1881–1888)
- Regent (1888–1899)

- Yawnghwe (complete list) –

- Sao Yun, Saopha (1762–1815)
- Sao Se U I, Saopha (1815–1818)
- Naw Mong II, Saopha (1818–1821)
- Sao Se U II, Saopha (1821–1852)
- Sao Se Hom, Saopha (1852–1858)
- Sao Naw Hpa, Saopha (1858–1864)
- Sao Maung, Saopha (1864–1885)
- Sao Ohn, Saopha (1886–1897)
- Sao Maung, Saopha (1897–1926)

- Zamorin of Calicut (complete list) –

- Krishna Varma, Samoothiri (1798–1806)

== Maldives ==
- Sultanate of the Maldives: Huraa Dynasty (complete list) –

- Muhammad Mueenuddeen I, Sultan (1799–1835)
- Muhammad Imaaduddeen IV, Sultan (1835–1882)
- Ibrahim Nooraddeen, Sultan (1882–1886)
- Muhammad Mueenuddeen II, Sultan (1886–1888)
- Ibrahim Nooraddeen, Sultan (1888–1892)
- Muhammad Imaaduddeen V, Sultan (1892–1893)
- Muhammad Shamsuddeen III, Sultan (1893)
- Muhammad Imaaduddeen VI, Sultan (1893–1902)

== Nepal ==
- Kingdom of Nepal

- Kings (complete list) –

- Girvan Yuddha Bikram Shah, King (1799–1816)
- Rajendra, King (1816–1847)
- Surendra, King (1847–1881)
- Prithvi, King (1881–1911)

- Mulkajis / Prime ministers (complete list) –

- Kirtiman Singh Basnyat, Mulkaji (1794–1801)
- Bakhtawar Singh Basnyat, Mulkaji (1801–1803)
- Damodar Pande, Prime minister (1799–1804), Mulkaji (1803–1804)
- Ranajit Pande, Mulkaji (1804)
- Bhimsen Thapa, Prime minister (1806–1837)
- Rana Jang Pande, Prime minister (1837)
- Ranga Nath Poudyal, Prime minister (1837–1838)
- Chautariya Puskhar Shah, Prime minister (1838–1839)
- Rana Jang Pande, Prime minister (1839–1840)
- Ranga Nath Poudyal, Prime minister (1840)
- Fateh Jung Shah, Prime minister (1840–1843)
- Mathabarsingh Thapa, Prime minister (1843–1845)
- Fateh Jung Shah, Prime minister (1845–1846)
- Jung Bahadur Rana, Prime minister (1846–1856)
- Bam Bahadur Kunwar, Prime minister (1856–1857)
- Krishna Bahadur Kunwar Rana, Prime minister (1857)
- Jung Bahadur Rana, Prime minister (1857–1877)
- Ranodip Singh Kunwar, Prime minister (1877–1885)
- Bir Shumsher Jang Bahadur Rana, Prime minister (1885–1901)

== Pakistan ==
- Bahawalpur (complete list) –

- Bahawal II, Nawab (1772–1809)
- Sadiq II, Nawab (1809–1826)
- Bahawal III, Nawab (1826–1852)
- Sadiq III, Nawab (1852–1853)
- Fath Mohammad Khan, Nawab (1853–1858)
- Bahawal IV, Nawab (1858–1866)
- Sadiq IV, Nawab (1866–1899)
- Bahawal V, Nawab (1899–1907)

- Chitral (complete list) –

- Muhtaram Shah Katur II, Mehtar (?)
- Shah Afzal II, Mehtar (c.1838–1854)
- Muhtarram Shah Kator III, Mehtar (c.1854–1858)
- Aman ul-Mulk, Mehtar (c.1858–1892)
- Afzal ul-Mulk, Mehtar (1892)
- Sher Afzal, Mehtar (1892)
- Nizam ul-Mulk, Mehtar (1892–1895)
- Amir ul-Mulk, Mehtar (1895)
- Shuja ul-Mulk, Mehtar (1895–1936)

- Khairpur (complete list) –

- Sohrab Khan Talpur, Mir (1783–1830)
- Rustam Ali Khan Talpur, Mir (1830–1842)
- Ali Murad Khan Talpur, Mir (1842–1894)
- Faiz Muhammad Khan Talpur I, Mir (1894–1909)

- Khanate of Kalat (complete list) –

- Mahmud Khan I Ahmadzai, Khan (1794–1817)
- Mehrab Khan Ahmadzai II, Khan (1817–1839)
- Mir Shah Nawaz Khan Ahmadzai, Khan (1839–1841)
- Mir Nasir Khan II Ahmadzai, Khan (1841–1857)
- Mir Khudadad Khan, Khan (1857–1863)
- Mir Sherdil Khan Ahmadzai, usurper Khan (1863–1864)
- Mir Khudadad Khan, Khan (1864–1893)
- Mir Mahmud Khan II Ahmadzai, Khan (1893–1931)

- Sikh Empire (complete list) –

- Maharajas –

- Ranjit Singh, Maharaja (1801–1839)
- Kharak Singh, Maharaja (1839)
- Nau Nihal Singh, Maharaja (1839–1840)
- Chand Kaur, Maharaja (1840–1841)
- Sher Singh, Maharaja (1841–1843)
- Duleep Singh, Maharaja (1843–1849)

- Wazirs –

- Jamadar Khushal Singh, Wazir (1799–1818)
- Dhian Singh Dogra, Wazir (1818–1843)
- Hira Singh Dogra, Wazir (1843–1844)
- Jawahar Singh Aulakh, Wazir (1844–1845)
- Gulab Singh, Wazir (1846–1846)

== Sri Lanka ==
- Kingdom of Kandy (complete list) –

- Sri Vikrama Rajasinha, King (1798–1815)

== See also ==
- List of governors of dependent territories in the 19th century
