= List of Diwans of Travancore =

The Diwan or Dewan of Travancore was the head of government of Travancore in the nineteenth and twentieth centuries, serving at the pleasure of the Maharaja, corresponding to a prime minister, and consisting in the formal titles Valiya Sarvadhikaryakar and Dalawa until the insurrection of Velu Thampi Dalawa and administrative reforms of John Munro. Post-Munro, the title of Dalawa, which remained formally the highest ranking established office, though administratively impotent, was revived as a sinecure to sideline Raman Menon and remove him from the Diwanship. The office of Diwan existed until 1948, when it gave way to the office of Prime Minister of Travancore.

== List of Diwans ==
- Arumukham Pillai (1729–1736)
- Thanu Pillai (1736–1737)
- Ramayyan Dalawa (1737–1756)
- Martandan bagavathi Pillai (1756–1763)
- Subbayyan Dalawa (1763–1768)
- Krishna Gopalayyan Iyyer (1768–1776)
- Vadiswaran Subbrahmanya Iyer (1776–1780)
- Mullen Chempakaraman Pillai (1780–1782)
- Nagercoil Ramayyan (1782–1788)
- Krishnan Thampi (1788–1789)
- Raja Kesavadas, real name Kesava Pillai (1789–1798)
- Odiery Jayanthan Sankaran Nampoothiri (1798–1799)
- Velu Thampi Dalawa (1799–1809)
- Oommini Thampi (1809–1811)
- Col. John Munro (1811–1814)
- Devan Padmanabhan Menon (1814–1814)
- Bappu Rao (acting; 1814–1815)
- Sanku Annavi Pillai (1815–1815)
- Raman Menon (1815–1817)
- Reddy Row (1817–1821)
- T. Venkata Rao (1821–1830)
- Thanjavur Subha Rao (1830–1837)
- T. Ranga Rao (acting; 1837–1838)
- T. Venkata Rao (second time; 1838–1839)
- Thanjavur Subha Rao (second time; 1839–1842)
- Krishna Rao (acting; 1842–1843)
- Reddy Row (second time; 1843–1845)
- Srinivasa Rao (acting; 1845–1846)
- Vemuri Krishna Rao (1846–1857)

Name	Portrait	Took office	Left office	Term
T. Madhava Rao		1858	1872	1
A. Seshayya Sastri		1872	1877	1
Nanoo Pillai		1877	1880	1
V. Ramiengar		1880	1887	1
T. Rama Rao		1887	1892	1
S. Shungrasoobyer		1892	1898	1
K. Krishnaswamy Rao		15 April 1898	13 March 1904	1
V. P. Madhava Rao		14 March 1904	26 March 1906	1
S. Gopalachari		16 August 1906	26 October 1907	1
P. Rajagopalachari		26 October 1907	11 May 1914	1
M. Krishnan Nair		11 May 1914	7 July 1920	1
T. Raghavaiah		8 July 1920	18 May 1925	1
M. E. Watts		1925	1929	1
V. S. Subramanya Iyer		1929	1932	1
Thomas Austin		1932	1934	1
Muhammad Habibullah		1934	1936	1
C. P. Ramaswami Iyer		1936	1947	1
P. G. N. Unnithan		1947	1948	1

== See also ==
- Prime Minister of Hyderabad
- List of Diwans of Mysore
