= Rao (Indian surname) =

Rao is a title and a surname native to India. It is used mostly in states of Andhra Pradesh, Gujarat, Haryana, Karnataka, Maharashtra, Rajasthan, and Telangana.

== As a surname ==
Notable people with this surname or title include the following:

=== Pre-independence ===
- Rao Tula Ram (c. 1825 – 1863) - Rewari King who fought Great Battle of 1857.
- T. Madhava Rao (1829–1891) - Diwan of Travancore from 1857 to 1872.
- R. Raghunatha Rao (c. February 1831 – May 3, 1912) - Diwan of Indore from 1875 to 1888
- R. Venkata Rao - Diwan of Travancore from 1821 to 1829.
- T. Subba Rao - Diwan of Travancore from 1830 to 1837.
- V. P. Madhava Rao - 17th Diwan of the Mysore kingdom
- T. Ananda Rao - 18th Diwan of the Mysore kingdom
- N. Madhava Rao - 23rd Diwan of the Mysore Kingdom
- K. Krishnaswamy Rao - Diwan of Travancore from 1898 to 1904
- T. Rama Rao (administrator) - Diwan of Travancore from 1887 to 1892
- T. Ramachandra Rao (1825-1879) - Indian civil servant and first native Indian to serve as Deputy Commissioner of Police of Madras.
- R. Ramachandra Rao (1871 – 1936) - Indian civil servant and mathematician.
- R. Balaji Rao (1842–1896) - an Indian politician, independence activist.
- Gangadharrao Deshpande (1871-1960) (also known as Lion of Karnataka) - Indian activist and leader of Indian independence movement against British rule from Belgaum.
- C. Hayavadana Rao (1865 – 1946) - an Indian historian, museologist, anthropologist, economist and polyglot.
- T. Gopala Rao (1832 – 1886) - educationist, served as the Principal of Government Arts College, Kumbakonam after William Archer Porter and first inspector of schools under British government.

=== Post-independence ===
- Anil V. Rao, Professor of Aerospace Engineering at University of Florida

Raja Rao writer of English-language novels and short stories, whose works are deeply rooted in metaphysics

- Ayyagari Sambasiva Rao (1914–2003), an Indian scientist, founder of the Electronics Corporation of India Limited
- Adinarayana Rao, Telugu film director and founder of Anjali pictures.
- Akkineni Nageswara Rao, Telugu film actor and founder of Annapurna studios. He received Padma Bhushan for his contribution to film industry.
- Calyampudi Radhakrishna Rao (1920–2023), Indian-born American mathematician and statistician
- Chennamaneni Hanumantha Rao, Indian economist and writer
- C. S. Rao (writer), Indian writer, actor, director and producer
- C. S. Rao (1924–2004), an Indian actor, writer and director
- Dabeeru C. Rao, Indian-American statistical geneticist
- Dasari Narayana Rao, Telugu film director and actor.
- Dileep Rao (1973–), American actor
- Ganta Srinivasa Rao, Indian politician, ex-Lok Sabha member
- Gundu Hanumantha Rao, Indian actor
- Gnaneswara Rao, Indian cricketer
- Joginder Singh Rao, Indian cricketer
- Karri Narayana Rao, Indian lawyer, ex-member of Lok Sabha and Indian politician
- Kemburi Ramamohan Rao, Indian Politician, ex-member of Lok Sabha
- Kimidi Kalavenkata Rao, Indian Politician, ex-minister, ex-member of Rajya Sabha
- K. Keshava Rao, member of Rajya Sabha
- K. R. Rao, professor of electrical engineering at the University of Texas and co-inventor of the discrete cosine transform
- K. S. Rama Rao, Telugu cinema producer
- Kodela Siva Prasad Rao, speaker of Andhra Pradesh Assembly
- Kalvakuntla Chandrashekar Rao, Chief minister of Telangana
- Michael Rao (1967–), president of Virginia Commonwealth University since 2009
- Muttamsetti Srinivasa Rao, Indian Politician, Ex-member of Lok Sabha and minister in Andhra Pradesh Cabinet
- N. T. Rama Rao (1923 – 1996), film personality and former chief minister of united Andhra Pradesh
- Narla Tata Rao, Engineer and recipient of Padma Shri award
- Neomi Rao, American attorney and government official
- Nirmala Rao, British academic, present VC of Asian University for Women.
- Pappala Chalapathi Rao, Indian Politician
- P. V. Narasimha Rao - 9th Prime Minister Of India
- Rajkummar Rao, Indian film actor.
- Amrita Rao, Indian film actress
- Panje Mangesh Rao (1874 – 1937) Indian writer and poet
- Aditi Rao Hydari, Indian film actress
- Preetika Rao, Indian television actress
- Ramoji Rao, Telugu businessman, owner of Ramoji group
- Samarla Venkata Ranga Rao (1918 – 1974), Telugu film actor and recipient of Rashtrapati Award and International Award.
- Svetha Yallapragada Rao (born 1986), American singer
- Thummala Nageswara Rao, Telangana minister
- Udupi Ramachandra Rao - Indian space scientist and director of ISRO
- V. Hanumantha Rao, Ex-member of Rajya Sabha, Indian politician
- Vandana Rao, Arjuna Awardee who represented India in 1984 and 1988 Olympics in 4 × 400 m women relay race
- Vangaveeti Mohana Ranga Rao (known as Ranga; 1947 – 1988) was an Indian National Congress politician
- Vanama Venkateshwara Rao, Ex-minister in Andhra Pradesh
- Swami Ramdas (born Vittal Rao), a saint from Kanhangad, Kerala
- Gitanjali Rao (scientist) – high achiever in science at STEM School Highlands Ranch, Colorado, US
- Y. S. Rao, professor at IIT Bombay

== See also ==
- Rao (Chinese surname)
- Rao (title)
