= R. Raghunatha Rao =

Indian civil servant (1831–1912)

Diwan Bahadur Rai Raghunatha Rao CSI
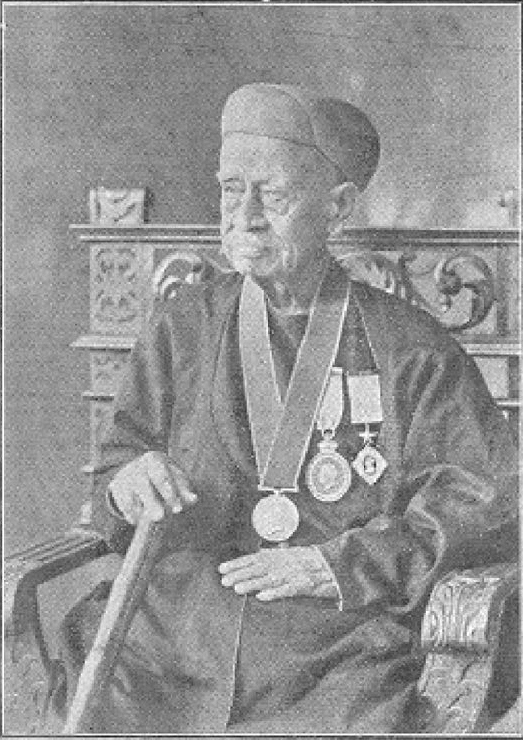
- Portrait of R. Raghunatha Rao

Diwan of Indore
- In office 1875–1881
- Monarch: Tukojirao Holkar II
- Preceded by: Sir T. Madhava Rao
- Succeeded by: Shahamat Ali
- In office 1886–1888
- Monarch: Shivajirao Holkar
- Preceded by: Nana Moroji Trilokekar
- Succeeded by: Balkrishna Atmaram Gupte

Personal details
- Born: 7 February 1831 Kumbakonam, Thanjavur Maratha kingdom
- Died: 3 May 1912 (age 81) Madras, British India
- Party: Indian National Congress (founder)
- Relations: R. Venkata Rao (father), R. Ranga Rao (uncle), Raja Sir T. Madhava Rao (cousin), T. Rama Rao (cousin); Sir T. Ananda Rao (nephew)
- Education: Presidency College, Madras
- Occupation: Civil servant, Administrator

Diwan Bahadur Rai Raghunatha Rao CSI (7 February 1831 – 3 May 1912) was an Indian civil servant, administrator, politician and Indian independence activist who served as the Diwan of Indore from 1875 to 1880, and again from 1886 to 1888. He was a member of the Rao family, a founder of the Indian National Congress and the Madras Mahajana Sabha, and an influential member of the Mylapore set.

== Early life and education ==
Raghunatha Rao was born in a prominent Marathi Deshastha Brahmin family in February 1831 in Kumbakonam. He was the son of R. Venkata Rao former Diwan of Travancore and a cousin of Sir T. Madhava Rao who later served as Diwan of Travancore, Indore and Baroda. Raghunatha Rao had his early schooling in Bangalore Fort and did his proficient's course at Government High School, Madras (now Presidency College, Madras). Rao studied law in private and obtained a pleader's diploma in 1856 but did not practise. Instead, he entered the Madras Provincial Civil Service.

== Madras Civil Service ==
Raghunatha Rao started his career as a translator in the office of the District Collector and rose to become Sheristadar and eventually Deputy Collector of Madras District. He was placed on special duty in the Tungabhadra Project for sometime but was later transferred to Trichinopoly and then, Coimbatore districts.

In 1873, Raghunatha Rao met Tukojirao Holkar II, the Raja of Indore. Two years later, the Holkar requested Rao to serve the state as Special Settlement Officer. Later that same year, Rao replaced his cousin Sir T. Madhava Rao as Diwan of Indore.

== Diwan of Indore ==
In 1875, Raghunatha Rao was appointed Diwan of Indore and he took over succeeding his cousin Madhava Rao. Raghunatha Rao's administration is regarded as one of progress and the Diwan is recorded as selecting the most qualified men for judicial positions in the state. Raghunatha Rao returned to Madras in 1880 and returned to Indore in 1886 to serve for a brief span of two years.

== Social life ==
Raghunatha Rao was one of the founders of the Madras Mahajana Sabha and the Indian National Congress. The Indian National Social Conference, the first of its kind, was inaugurated at Raghunatha Rao's house in Madras in December 1887. The conference was presided over by Sir T. Madhava Rao.

A statue of Krishna was installed in front of the Kumbakonam Town Hall (also called Porter Hall) in 1913 and was dedicated to Raghunatha Rao.
