= Raman Menon =

Diwan Bahadur Palakkal Raman Menon Dalawa Mannadinayar (also Palakkad Raman Menon and Ankarath Raman Menon) was Dewan of Travancore, serving Maharani Gowri Lakshmi Bayi, and then Maharani Gowri Parvati Bayi during their successive regencies for Maharaja Swathi Thirunal Rama Varma, from 1815 to 1817, and Dalawa of Travancore thereafter, holding auxiliary office as Fouzdar.

Previously he served as a Sheristadar and justice of the Huzhur Court of Travancore, as Sarvadhikari of the kingdom of Cochin, serving Kerala Varma III, and as Sarvadhikari of the kingdom of Calicut. Colonial administrator General John Munro, 9th of Teaninich was his patron, and, later, antagonist.

Reddy Row's successful intriguing displaced Menon from the Diwanship to the obsolete offices of Dalawa and Fouzdar in 1817, whereupon Menon elected to not even bother dignifying the sinecures' demands. He did ally to himself a young Rai Raya Rai Venkata Rao, then new to Munro's retinue as a fresh, scholarly, English-speaking young bureaucrat, facilitating Rao's selection as Diwan Peishkar. When Reddy Row accepted the small jagir of two villages in Sengottai (Sambavarvadakarai) from Maharani Gowri Parvati Bayi as thanks for having skilfully married off Princess Rukmini Bayi, and, concurrently, Newall retired, Menon and Rao struck; highlighting the prospect of corrupt dealing to the incoming Resident, who opened an investigation into possible impropriety. Reddy Row was ultimately forced from the Diwanship in only 1821, whereupon R. Venkata Rao succeeded him.

In 1828 the new Maharaja of Cochin, Rama Varma XI, apologized for the expropriation of Menon's family's assets, restoring them, and conferring the title of Mannadi Nair on Raman Menon, his brother, and their descendants, with women receiving the style of Nethyar Amma.

== Family ==
Menon was born to Narikkode Kunjulakshmi Amma and Kunjunni Thampuran of the Mankada kovilakam of the Velattiri royal family of Valluvanad. He married Narayani Amma - possibly his maternal first cousin - late in life, founding with her the Vengalil tharavadu and building its eponymous sixteen-halled pathinarukettu in Panniyankara, Calicut, while his younger brother Krishnan founded the Ankarath tharavadu. His eldest daughter, Valiyammalu, married Kunhiraman, the last Koothali Nair; their only daughter Lakshmikutty married the son of Udayavarma, Porlathiri Raja of Kadathanad, and was mother to Indian Defence Minister and de facto Foreign Minister V. K. Krishna Menon, the Sanskritist V. Chinnamalu Amma, and the consort of Rama Varma XIX, the last Maharaja of Cochin. Another daughter, Lakshmi, married P.C.V. Manavikraman Kuttunni Thampuran, reigning Zamorin of Calicut from 1915 to 1928; their daughter Kunjilakshmi married P.C. Anujan Thampuran, who succeeded his father-in-law as Zamorin, reigning from 1928 to 1931. His son Vengalil Raman Menon was a Munsif and father to politician Konnanath Balakrishna Menon, while his son Vengalil Sankara Menon was a leading South Indian lawyer, and father to famed trial lawyer K. Kunhirama Menon and Kalakshetra director K. Sankara Menon, who was Rukmini Devi Arundale's second husband and successor.
