= T. Rama Rao (administrator) =

Indian administrator (1831–1895)

Tanjore Rama Rao CIE
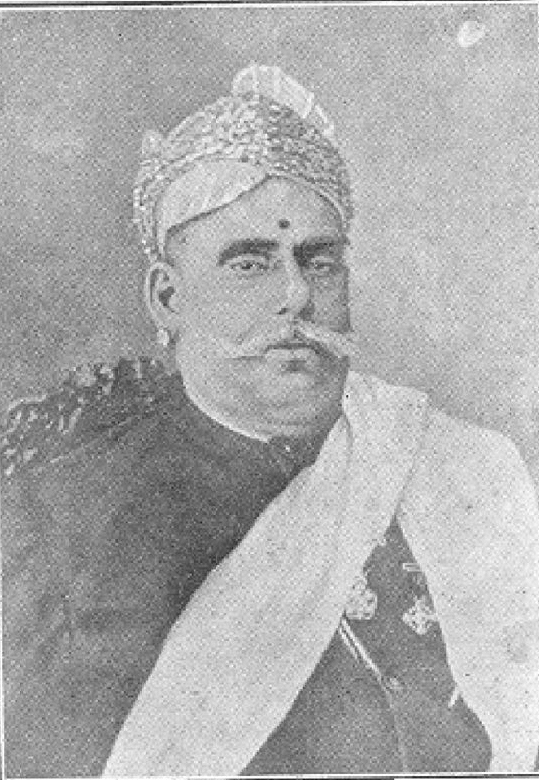
- Portrait of T. Rama Rao

Diwan of Travancore
- In office 1887–1892
- Monarch: Moolam Thirunal
- Preceded by: V. Ramiengar
- Succeeded by: S. Shungrasoobyer

Personal details
- Born: 1831 Trivandrum, Travancore
- Died: 5 June 1895 (aged 63–64) Trivandrum, Travancore
- Occupation: civil servant, Administrator
- Profession: Statesman

Tanjore Rama Rao CIE (c. 1831 – 5 June 1895), was an Indian administrator who served as the Diwan of Travancore (now part of Kerala State) from 1887 to 1892. V. Nagam Aiya, in his 1906 Travancore State Manual calls him "the most popular Diwan in recent times". Rama Rao was a cousin of Rajah Sir T. Madhava Rao and Diwan Bahadur R. Raghunatha Rao. All three were grandsons of Gundopanth. Rama Rao's mother Sonamma Bai was Gundopanth's daughter, while Diwan Bahadur R. Raghunatha Rao's father R. Venkata Rao and T. Madhava Rao's father R. Ranga Rao were Gundopanth's sons.

== Early life and career ==
Rama Rao was born in a Thanjavur Marathi Deshastha Brahmin family in Trivandrum in the year 1831 to Sakharam Row, a former District and Sessions judge, and Sonamma Bai, daughter of the Tanjore Rao family. His forefathers had migrated to Travancore kingdom from Kumbakonam (Tanjore kingdom) during the early decades of the 19th century. Rama Rao had his schooling at the Rajah's Free School in Trivandrum and the L. M. S. Seminary at Nagercoil. On completion of his education, Rama Rao entered the Travancore civil service and worked as a clerk. When he did not receive promotion, Rama Rao quit the job and accepted an offer as a translator in district and sessions court in Calicut. In 1857, Rama Rao was appointed Tahsildar of Kalkulam. He was soon promoted as Deputy Sheristadar and as First Sheristadar in the Huzur Cutcherry. He became Deputy Peishkar of the Quilon Division in 1862.

Rama Rao served as Deputy Peishkar of Quilon division from 1862 to 1878 and Kottayam division from 1878 to 1887, when he was appointed Diwan of Travancore. Based on his recommendations, Maharaja Moolam Thirunal issued a regulation on 30 March 1888 to set up a Legislative Council "to have the benefit of discussing with and taking the opinion of responsible officers associated with him in matters of legislation which as being one of the most important functions of Government, should receive most careful consideration before being submitted to the Sovereign to be passed into law". The Council met for the first time on 23 August 1888 in the Diwan's chambers and Travancore Kingdom became the first among Indian Princely States to have a legislative body and recognize the value of such an institution. Over the years the Council grew into the 140 member Legislative Assembly of Kerala State, Republic of India. Rama Rao thus had the honour of sowing the seed of legislative governance for the first time (in any Princely State) in India, the largest Democracy in the world.

Rama Rao was known for his honesty and integrity even from early days in service. The esteem with which the British treated him was epitomised when Lord Connemara (Robert Bourke, the 1st Baron Connemara) the then Governor of Madras called on him at his private residence "Hill-View" during his visit to Travancore - an honour which no other Diwan, before or after, has had.

In 1891 Rama Rao was created a Companion of the Indian Empire by Victoria, Queen of the United Kingdom and Empress of India and the citation reads "Victoria, by the Grace of God of the United Kingdom of Great Britain and Ireland, Queen, Defender of Faith, Empress of India and Sovereign of the Most Eminent Order of the Indian Empire, To. T. Rama Row, Diwan of the Travancore State, Greeting; Whereas We have thought fit to nominate and appoint you to be a companion of Our said Most Eminent Order of the Indian Empire, We do by these Presents grant unto you the dignity of a Companion of Our said Order and hereby authorise you to have, hold and enjoy the said dignity and rank as a Companion of Our aforesaid Order, together with all the singular privileges thereunto belonging or appertaining ......Given at Our Court at Osborne under Our Sign Manual and the seal of Our said Order, this first day of January 1891 in the fifty-fourth year of Our reign. By Sovereign's command."

== Later life and death ==
Rama Rao's private charities were varied and many. He built a hospital from his own private sources to serve the poor and most depressed class of the population of the rural community at Nedungolam near present-day Kollam on 4 December 1894 and requested the London Mission Society (LMS) to manage it. The Everest mountaineer, surgeon, painter and medical missionary Howard Somervell, working then for LMS has this to say about his visit to this hospital "The first...hospital we visit is Nedungolam, the hospital which was entirely built by one family, the Rama Rao Brahmin family whose present head, Rao Sahib Padmanabha Rao, lends me a small house at Nedungolam whilst I am working at this hospital. The way in which (his) family have built this hospital and take an interest in it is a very exceptional and worthy thing — I wish it were more usual. A few years ago a nice little operating-room was put up at Nedungolam so now we can do anything there which doesn't require very special or prolonged treatment". Over the last 123 years this hospital has grown into a major establishment and is presently run by the Health and Family Welfare Dept of the Govt of Kerala who have renamed it as "Rama Rao Memorial Taluk Hospital"

Rama Rao's daughter, Soundara Bai, was married to Raja Sir T. Madhava Rao's son Sir T. Ananda Rao who was Diwan of Mysore kingdom from 1909 to 1912.

Rama Rao died on 8 June 1895 at Trivandrum (now Thiruvananthapuram) and was cremated in the sprawling grounds of his residence "Hill-View".
