= T. Ananda Rao =

Indian statesman (1852–1919)

Pradhana Shiromani Sir Tanjore Ananda Rao CIE
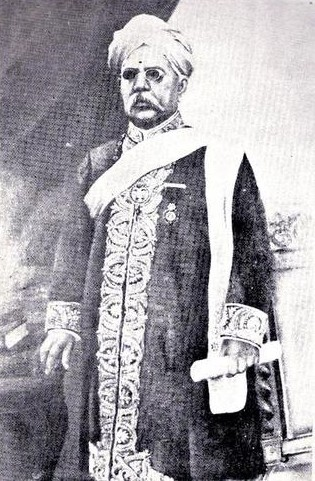
- Portrait of Tanjore Ananda Rao when he was Diwan of Mysore

18th Dewan of Mysore
- In office 1 April 1909 – 10 November 1912
- Monarch: Krishna Raja Wadiyar IV
- Preceded by: V. P. Madhava Rao
- Succeeded by: M. Visvesvaraya

Personal details
- Born: May 15, 1852 Trivandrum
- Died: July 19, 1919 (aged 67)
- Education: Presidency College, Chennai
- Profession: Civil servant

Sir Tanjore Ananda Rao CIE (alternatively known as Ananda Rao Thanjavarkar) (15 May 1852 – 19 July 1919) was an Indian administrator and statesman who served as the 18th Dewan of Mysore from 1909 to 1912. He was the eldest son of Sir T. Madhava Rao, and a member of the Rao family.

== Early life and education ==
Ananda Rao was born on 15 May 1852 at Padma Vilas, Trivandrum Fort, to Sir T. Madhava Rao, a prominent Indian statesman who was known for his work as the Diwan of Travancore and of Baroda and as one of the early pioneers of the Indian National Congress. The Rao family belonged to the Marathi-speaking Deshastha Brahmin community of Thanjavur district. Rao had his schooling in Madras and completed his matriculation in first class in 1867 and his F. A. in first class in 1869. He earned Bachelor of Arts (B.A) in history in first class from the Presidency College, Madras and in logic and psychology from the Maharaja's College, Thiruvananthapuram.

He married his cousin Soundara Bai, daughter of T. Rama Rao.

== Career ==
T. Ananda Rao at his palace.

Rao was initially employed as a tutor to Maharaja Tukajirao Holkar III before joining as an attache to the Mysore Commission on 14 November 1873. Rao was appointed Assistant Commissioner of Bangalore on 7 July 1876 and was in charge of Mysore Palace accounts from 1 December 1879 to January 1883.

Rao served as the Assistant Commissioner for Hassan and Kaduru from 1883 to 1886 and Acting Deputy Commissioner of Hassan and Mysore from 1886 to 1889. He served as the Chief Secretary to Dewan Sir K. Seshadri Iyer from 1889 to 1897 and Director of Agricultural and Other Statistics from 1897 to 1904. Rao was appointed Revenue Commissioner on 14 March 1904 and served in the Mysore Legislative Council from 14 March 1906 until taking over as Dewan on 1 April 1909.

== Dewan of Mysore ==
Rao served as the Dewan of Mysore from 1 April 1909 till 10 November 1912. During his tenure, a lot of measures were taken for the economic development of Mysore. A reservoir was constructed in 1910 for the power station at Shivanasamudra. In the same year, the Mysore-Hassan railway line of Mysore Railways was extended, linking Saligrama and Yedatur with the line at Arsikere. The first Mysore Economic Conference was inaugurated on 10 June 1910 and met once every year. In 1911/1912, construction of the Krishnaraja Sagara Dam across the Kaveri at Kannambadi village was commenced.

It was Rao who invited Sir M. Visvesvaraya to be the chief engineer and secretary to the government of Mysore in 1909.

== Honours ==
Rao was made a Companion of the Order of the Indian Empire in 1910.

A major road junction along the Race Course Road in central Bangalore, is named after him as Dewan T. Ananda Rao Circle.
