= List of state leaders in the 19th century =

Lists of state leaders in the 19th century include:

- List of state leaders in the 19th century (1801–1850)
- List of state leaders in the 19th century (1851–1900)
- List of state leaders in 19th-century British South Asia subsidiary states
- List of state leaders in the 19th-century Holy Roman Empire
- List of governors of dependent territories in the 19th century
