= Gowri Parvati Bayi =

Maharani and regent of Travancore from 1815 to 1829

Uthrittathi Thirunal Gowri Parvathi Bayi
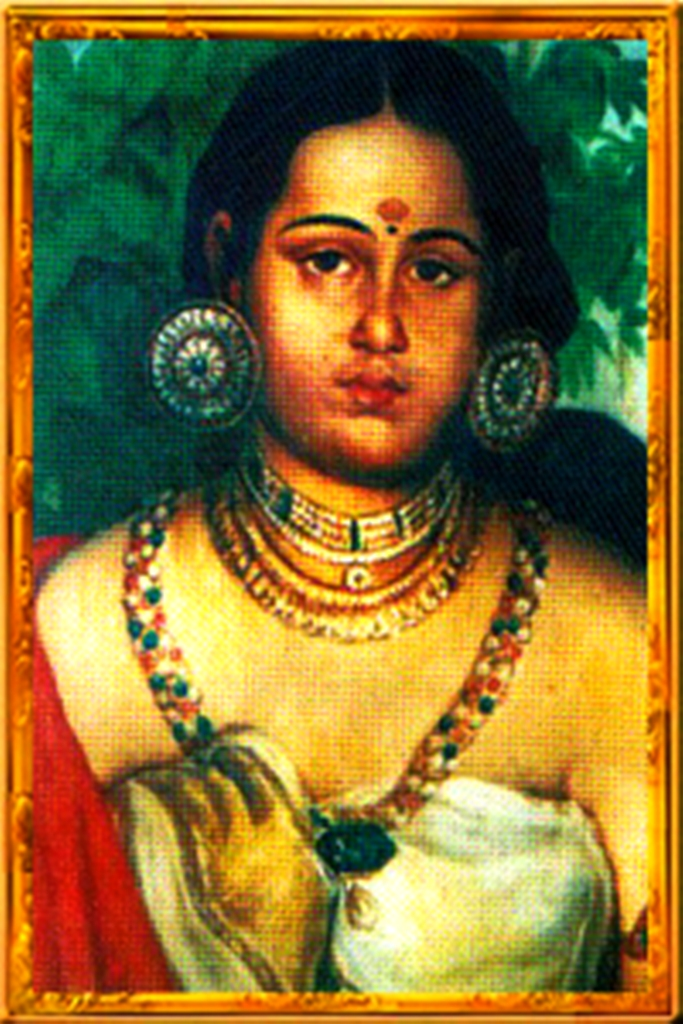

Maharani Regent of Travancore
- Regency: 1815–1829
- Predecessor: Gowri Lakshmi Bayi
- Monarch: Swathi Thirunal Rama Varma
- Consort: Raghava Varma Kovil Thampuran
- Issue: None
Names
- Her Highness Sree Padmanabhasevini Vanchi Dharma Vardhini Raja Rajeshwari Maharani Uthrittathi Thirunal Gowri Parvathi Bayi, Attingal Elaya Thampuran, Regent Maharani of Travancore.
- House: Venad Swaroopam
- Dynasty: Kulasekhara
- Religion: Hinduism

Maharani Uthrittathi Thirunal Gowri Parvathi Bayi (1802–1853) was the Regent of the Indian state of Travancore in 1815–1829. She succeeded her sister Maharani Gowri Lakshmi Bayi, till her regency was relinquished in favour of her nephew, Maharajah Swathi Thirunal.

== Early life ==
Maharani Gowri Parvathi Bayi was born to Princess Bharani Thirunal of the Travancore royal family in 1802, who was the Senior Rani of Attingal (the Maharani's of Travancore were styled as Ranis' of Attingal). When her elder sister Maharani Gowri Lakshmi Bayi died after childbirth in 1815, Gowri Parvati Bayi was only thirteen years of age. As the only female left in the family, Gowri Parvathi Bayi became Regent Maharani on behalf of her nephew, the heir, Maharajah Swathi Thirunal Rama Varma. Upon her accession she was actively counseled by her brother in law, Raja Raja Varma of the Changanssery royal family, as well as her husband, Raghava Varma, who belonged to the royal family of Kilimanoor

== Ministerial changes ==
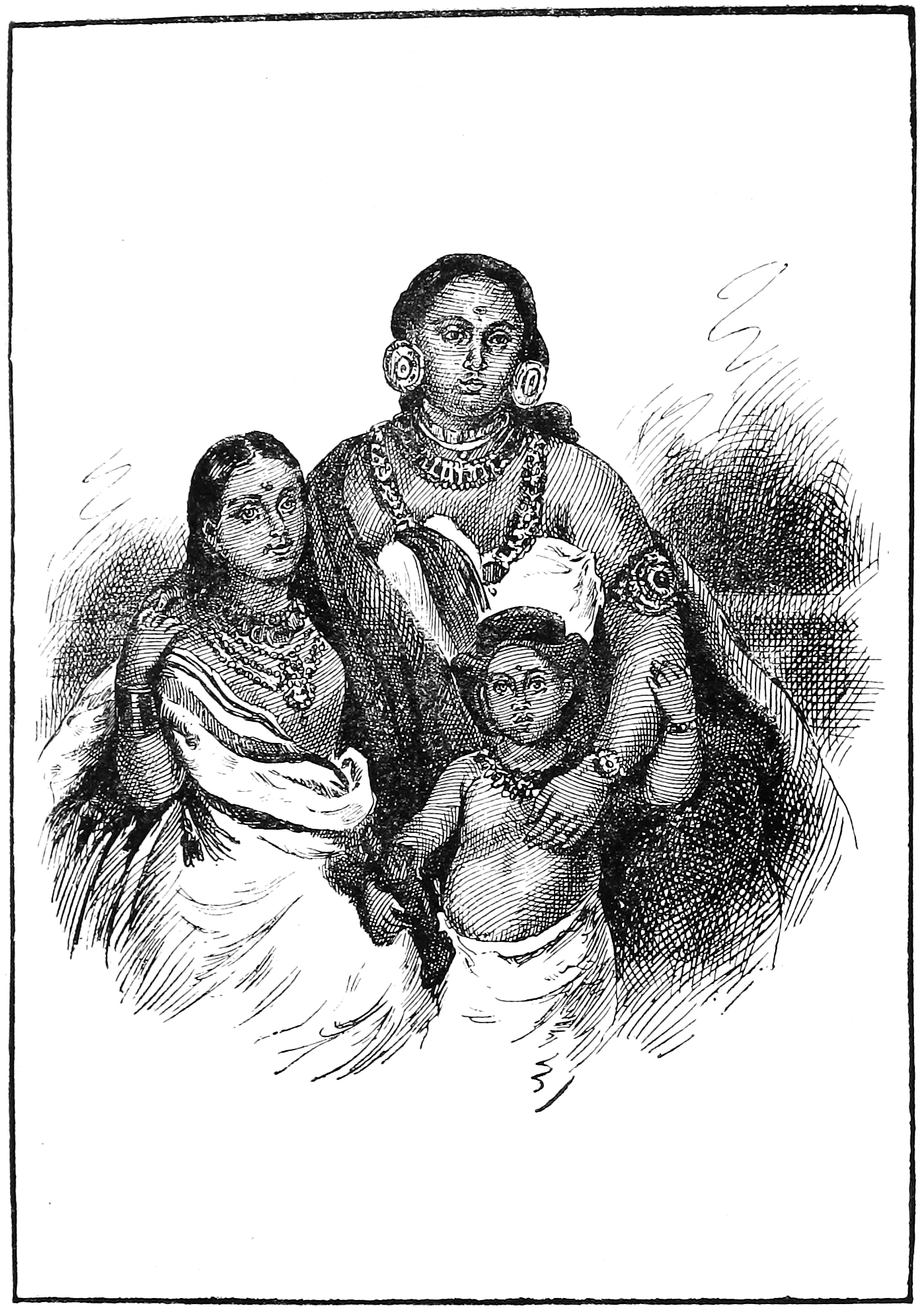
Gowri Parvati Bayi as regent alongside her niece Elaya Thampuran Rukmini and nephew Maharaja Swathi Thirunal

The Maharani's first act after coming to power was to appoint a new Dewan or Prime Minister to her state, as Dewan Devan Padmanabhan had died and state affairs were being conducted by his deputy Bappu Rao. In 1815 Sanku Annavi Pillai was appointed to the position but was soon found to be incapable of handling his difficult office and within two months he was removed. After ten months, following the suggestion of the British Resident, John Munro, 9th of Teaninich, Raman Menon, a Judge of the Huzhur Court of Travancore was appointed Dewan. However, differences of opinion arose between Dewan Raman Menon and the British Resident and hence Raman Menon was relocated to an inferior office in 1817, at which point he preferred to retire from service entirely. It may be of interest to note that Dewan Raman Menon was the great-grandfather of Krishna Menon, the reputed Indian diplomat of the 20th century, and the ancestor of the Vengalil family. In his stead a deputy known as Reddy Rao was appointed Dewan as he was close to the Resident in September 1817. He successfully reigned until the year 1821. In 1819 the British Resident Col. Munro resigned his office and a new Resident Col. McDowell succeeded him as the British Representative in Travancore. His assistant, Vencatta Rao, caused a falling out between him and the Dewan and in 1821 Vencatta Rao became Dewan of Travancore. He remained Dewan till the year 1830.

== Chief acts ==
Maharani Gowri Parvati Bayi instituted several reforms in her state during her regency on behalf of her nephew. Some of the chief reforms were:

- The beginning of modern education in Travancore can be traced to the issue of the Royal Rescript by Rani Gouri Parvati Bai in 1817. Consider the fact that the "universal education" was not practiced in most countries, including those in the West at this point in time.
- Christian ryots were freed from their services connected with Hindu religious ceremonies. They were also freed from attending to public work on Sundays with regard to their religious customs.
- Restrictions put on some of the lower castes of Travancore regarding the wearing of ornaments of gold and silver were removed and they were permitted to adorn themselves as they pleased. Among the higher castes such as the Nairs, for the use of gold ornaments special licenses (Adiyara Panam) had to be purchased. This was abolished.
- The Maharani passed a proclamation allowing everyone in her kingdom to tile the roofs of their houses. This was an important proclamation in the context of Kerala, seeing that at a time powerful kings like the Zamorin did not even permit their vassal kings to tile the roofs of their palaces.
- Restrictions in terms of usage of certain types of houses were removed. Previously only castes till the Nairs were permitted residences known as Nalukettus, after purchasing a licence (Adiyara Panam). Buildings known as Ettu Kettus, Panthrandu Kettus etc. were subject to high taxes and required licenses. Such taxes and payments were entirely abolished and members of all communities were permitted the use of these buildings. Similarly the right to travel in palanquins, atop elephants, and in carriages was permitted to all who could afford the same.
- Coffee cultivation was introduced into Travancore for the first time.
- Vaccination was introduced towards the end of the reign of her sister Maharani Gowri Lakshmi Bayi. This was popularised by her sister the Regent Maharani Gowri Parvati Bayi which was a great achievement for her.
- The Maharani permitted Christian Missionary enterprise in Travancore and even donated lands for the construction of churches in her state.
- Following the rebellion of Velu Thampi Dalawa the armies of Travancore had been disbanded save for seven hundred men to guard the palaces and for state ceremonies under the suzerainty of the British. The Maharani convinced the British Government of Madras to raise it to two thousand one hundred men in 1819.
- In 1818 under the regency of the Maharani, Travancore entered into a trade treaty with Ceylon for the supply of Jaffna Tobacco on certain stated terms and prices.
- The Maharani relieved the females of her country from their religious obligations of bearing torches during state processions in 1823. This relief to her womenfolk was twenty years before Lord Ashley passed an Act in England relieving women of that country from certain oppressive and degenerating obligations such as working bare-chested in coal mines etc.

The rescript regarding universalisation of education of 1817 says: "The state should defray the entire cost of the education of its people in order, that there might be no backwardness in the spread of enlightenment among them, that by diffusion of education they might become better subjects and public servants and that the reputation of the state might be advanced thereby."

The Queen's proclamation of 1817 is hailed by educational historians as 'the Magna Carta of Education' in Travancore. Through this rescript, the state was proclaiming its entire responsibility to provide budgetary accommodation for costs involved. A rule was also enforced that every school run on systematic lines was to have two teachers paid by the State. This may be regarded as the first formal recognition by the State to the right of education from public revenue.

== End of regency ==
In the year 1829 Maharajah Swathi Thirunal reached the age of sixteen and became a major. Hence his aunt, the Maharani, decided to relinquish her regency on his behalf and invest him with full powers. Accordingly, Maharajah Swathi Thirunal was crowned King in 1829.

== Full title ==
Her Highness Sri Padmanabha Sevini Vanchi Dharma Vardhini Raja Rajeshwari Maharani Uthrittathi Thirunal Gowri Parvati Bayi, Attingal Elaya Thampuran, Regent Maharani of Travancore.

== Review of the Maharani ==
In the words of V. Nagam Aiya, the author of the Travancore State Manual, 1906,

Her Highness was an enlightened and thoughtful ruler who illumined her reign by many humane acts of good government, the memory of which gladdened her last days...she used to refer with pride and satisfaction to her various acts of administration for the amelioration of her people..for many acts of redress of public wrongs had been either carried out or inaugurated during her reign. This was no small achievement for a Travancore queen when we remember that in the early years of reign of Queen Victoria of England, the condition of women in England was far worse than in Travancore.

== Family ==
The Maharani Gowri Parvati Bayi was married thrice. Her first husband was Raghava Varma of the Kilimanoor royal family and after his early death she married again, her husband's brother. His death in 1824 caused her to marry again but from none of her three marriages did the queen have any issue. She looked upon her nephews and niece as her own children since after the death of Gowri Lakshmi Bayi it was she who brought them up. She died in 1853.

== See also ==
- Swathi Thirunal
- Gowri Lakshmi Bayi
- Travancore
- Nair
- Moolam Thirunal

Gowri Parvati Bayi Kulasekhara dynasty Born: 1801 Died: 1853
Regnal titles
Preceded by Gowri Lakshmi Bayi (as Maharani Regent of Travancore)	Maharani Regent of Travancore; 1815–1829	Succeeded by Swathi Thirunal (as Maharaja of Travancore)
