= T. Madhava Rao =

Indian statesman

Rajah, Sir Tanjore Madhava Rao KCSI
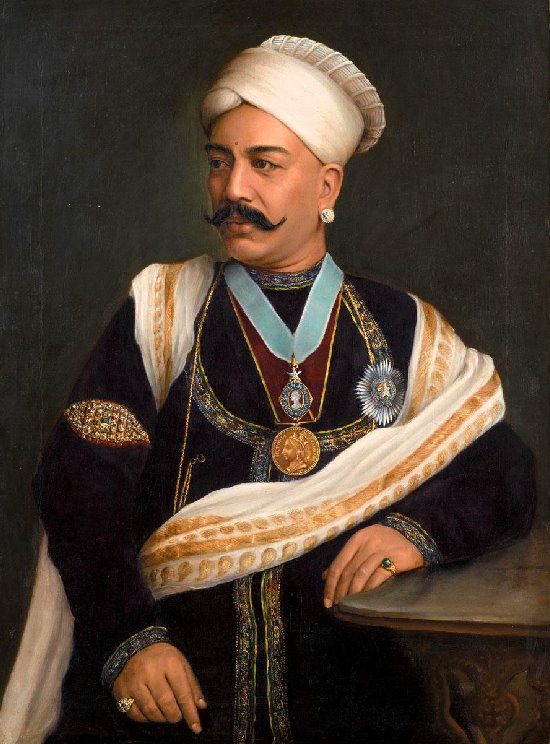
- c. 1880 portrait of Rao

Diwan of Baroda
- In office 10 May 1875 – 28 September 1882
- Monarch: Maharaja Sayajirao Gaekwad III
- Preceded by: Dadabhai Naoroji
- Succeeded by: Kazi Shahabuddin

Diwan of Indore
- In office 1873–1875
- Monarch: Tukojirao Holkar II
- Preceded by: Tukojirao Holkar II
- Succeeded by: R. Raghunatha Rao

Diwan of Travancore
- In office 1857 – May 1872
- Monarchs: Uthram Thirunal, Ayilyam Thirunal
- Preceded by: Krishna Rao
- Succeeded by: A. Seshayya Sastri

Personal details
- Born: 20 November 1828 Kumbakonam, Thanjavur Maratha kingdom
- Died: 4 April 1891 Mylapore, Madras, British India
- Spouse: Yamuna Bai
- Children: T. Ananda Rao
- Parent: T. Ranga Rao (father)
- Education: Madras University
- Occupation: politician, administrator
- Profession: lawyer

Raja Sir Tanjore Madhava Rao, KCSI (20 November 1828 – 4 April 1891), also known as Sir Madhava Rao Thanjavurkar or simply as Madhavarao Tanjorkar, was an Indian statesman, civil servant, administrator and politician who served as the Diwan of Travancore from 1857 to 1872, Indore from 1873 to 1875 and Baroda from 1875 to 1882. He was the nephew and son of the former Travancore Diwans T. Venkata Rao and T. Ranga Rao.

Madhava Rao was born in a prominent family of Deshastha Brahmins of Kumbakonam in 1828 and had his education in Madras. After serving for two years in the Madras civil service, Madhava Rao was appointed tutor to the princes of Travancore. Impressed with his performance, Madhava Rao was transferred to the Revenue Department in which he rose step by step to become Diwan in 1857.

Madhava Rao served as Diwan of Travancore from 1857 to 1872 bringing about developments in education, legislation, public works, medicine, vaccination and public health and agriculture. He was also responsible for clearing Travancore's public debts. Madhava Rao quit as Diwan of Travancore and returned to Madras in 1872. He served as Diwan of Indore from 1873 to 1875 and as Diwan of Baroda from 1875 to 1882. In his later life, Madhava Rao actively participated in politics and was one of the early pioneers of the Indian National Congress. Madhava Rao died in 1891 in Mylapore, Madras at the age of 63.

Madhava Rao was respected and regarded for his administrative abilities. British Liberal statesman Henry Fawcett called him "the Turgot of India". In 1866, he was made a Knight Commander of the Order of the Star of India.

== Early life and career ==
Madhava Rao was born on 20 November 1828 in a prominent Thanjavur Marathi Deshastha Brahmin family. His great-grandfather Gopal Pant and his grandfather, Gundo Pant, held offices of trust and power under the British as also various Indian princes. His father R. Ranga Rao served as the Diwan of Travancore from 1837—1838 and his paternal uncle Rai Raya Rai Venkata Rao was also a former Dewan of Travancore. Madhava Rao had two older brothers. His family was deeply attached to the Uttaradi Math.

Madhava Rao spent his early life in Madras city where he studied at the Government High School (later Presidency College, Madras). As a student, Madhava Rao was diligent and careful and strong in mathematics and science, and had as his tutor C. V. Runganada Sastri. In 1846, he received his Proficient's Degree with high honours. Soon afterwards, Powell appointed him tutor of Mathematics and Physics at the High School. However, Madhava Rao quit in a short while to take up a job in the office of the Accountant General. In 1848, he was appointed tutor to the princes of Travancore at the recommendation of the English Resident which he accepted. Madhava worked for four years as tutor to the Travancore princes. Impressed with his performance, he was offered a position in the Revenue Department of Travancore. In a short time, Madhava Rao rose to be Diwan Peishkar of the Southern division. One of his contributions as the Diwan Peishkar was the expansion of the rivulet which joins the Meenanthara and Koodo rivers. He also removed fraud from the transport of salt from Nanjinaud to Trivandrum and dacoits from the area.

During this time, Travancore was facing a severe financial crisis and the treasury was empty. A large amount of subsidy due to the Madras government remained unpaid. Not long after promulgating his infamous Doctrine of Lapse, Lord Dalhousie was looking forward to annexe Travancore too under this pretext. At this juncture, the Raja of Travancore Uthram Thirunal chose Madhava Rao to negotiate a deal with the British government which he did successfully. As a result, Madhava Rao was appointed the next Diwan of Travancore in 1857.

== Dewan of Travancore ==
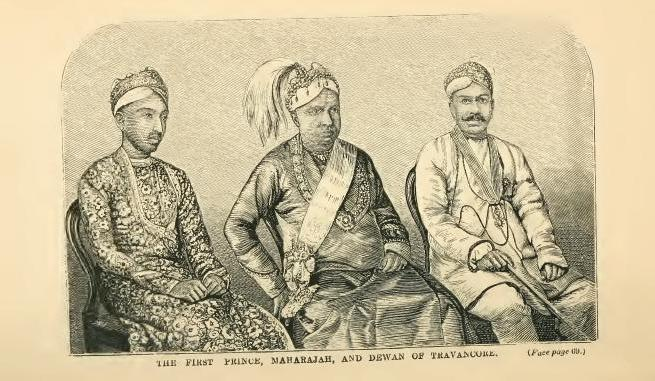
Madhava Rao with (from left) the heir-apparent Visakham Thirunal and the Maharaja of Travancore, Ayilyam Thirunal

At that time the entire administration of the state was in a disorganised state, public treasuries were empty and large arrears of payments in way of salaries and otherwise were pending. The Maharajah had already taken a loan from the Sri Padmanabhaswamy Temple of Trivandrum and adding the subsidy to be paid to the British Government, the state of affairs was bad enough to deter anyone from taking up the post of Dewan. Soon after Madhava Rao's appointment, the Shanar agitations took place in Travancore which added to the problems of the state.

In 1860 however, the orthodox Maharajah died and Madhava Rao's own pupil, the late Maharajah's nephew, Ayilyam Thirunal succeeded. Under the new and relatively less orthodox Maharajah, Madhava Rao's administration started its progress. Monopolies, numerous petty taxes and cessations were abolished and land tax was reduced. By 1863 the debts of the Travancore Government were cleared and the Dewan proudly declared that "Travancore has no public debt now". Salaries of public servants were raised by more than 50 percent and its morale and efficiency was improved. Madhava Rao's progressive financial measures were testified by the fact that when he assumed the office of Dewan he had an indebted and empty treasury whereas when he left the state in 1872 the state had a reserve fund of forty lakhs of rupees, a great amount in those days.

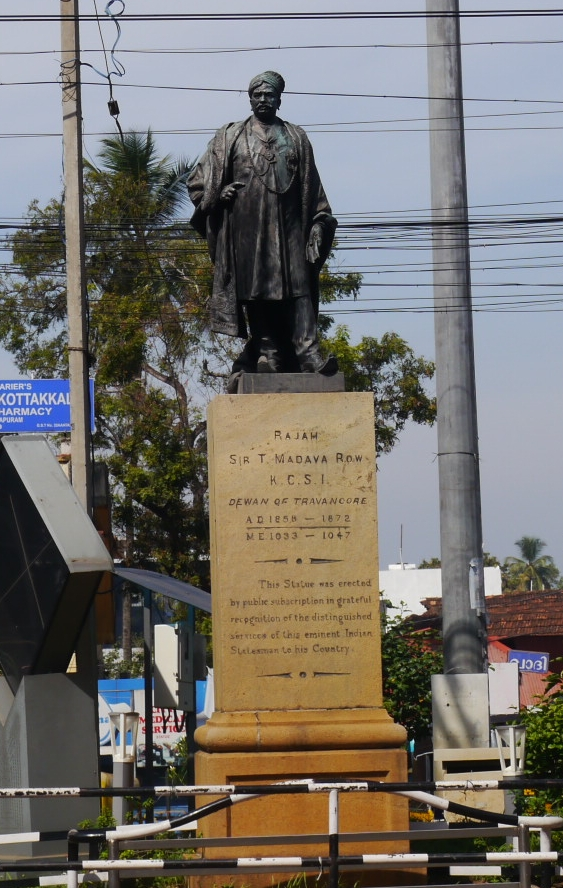
Statue in Thiruvananthapuram

While Madhava Rao is described essentially as a financier, he also brought a great deal of development in education, legislation, public works, medicine, vaccination and public health, agriculture etc. In education, he added a study of philosophy and international law and showed a taste for art and pictures. Despite his devotion to his own traditions, he advocated female education and social reform. Year after year his work was commended by the Madras Government. He also drew up State papers on special subjects such as Boundary disputes, trade reports and so on and started maintaining records of every department. In recognition of his services, by public subscription, a bronze statue of Madhava Rao was erected in Travancore.

The coffee cultivation in Travancore got a major boost under his administration. He started the policy of Pandarapatta Vilambaram. Under this policy, the land belonging to the government was leased to the farmers at a very low price for cultivation. This policy of leasing land had a huge impact on the people as lots of young people left farming and decided to get modern education. He also reduced the rate of export and import duties to relieve the trade.

However, due to misunderstandings which arose between the Dewan and the Maharajah, Madhava Rao retired in February 1872. The Maharajah, however, respected his work and granted him a pension of Rs. 1000, a princely amount in those days. His initial plan was to retire to Madras but instead there was great demand for his services among the Princes of India, because of his having secured for Travancore the appellation of "Model State of India" by the British Government. Henry Fawcett described, on hearing of his retirement in 1872, Madhava Rao as:

Sir Madhava Rao administered Travancore with so much skill as justly to entitle him to be considered the Turgot of India.. He found Travancore when he went there in 1858 in the lowest state of degradation. He has left it a Model State.

Madhava Rao was instrumental in recognising and employing Chattampi Swamikal at the Trivandrum secretariat.

== Indore and Baroda ==
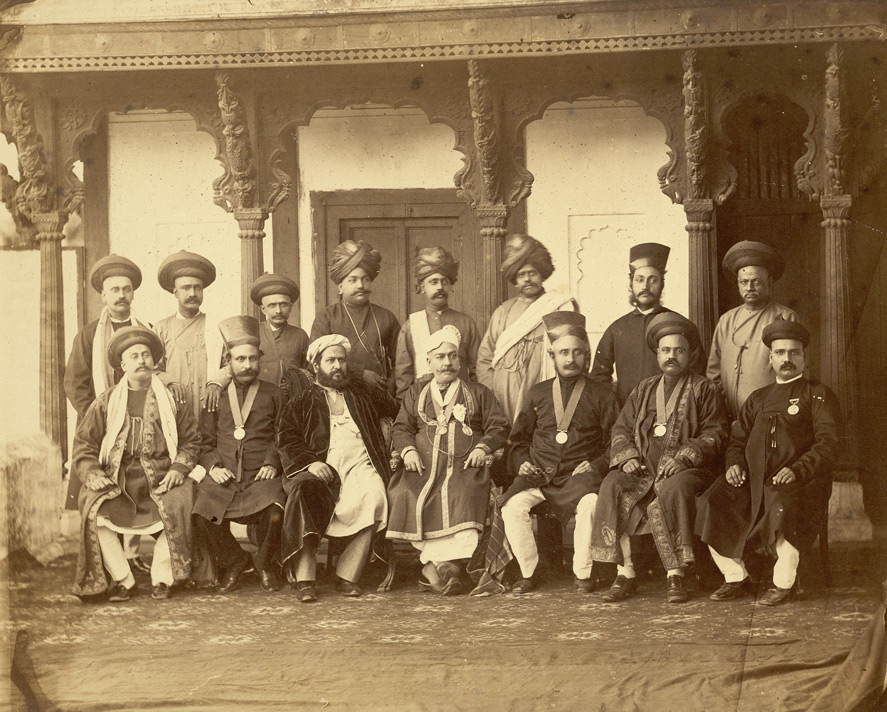
Group portrait of Madhava Rao and ministers of Baroda (circa 1880)

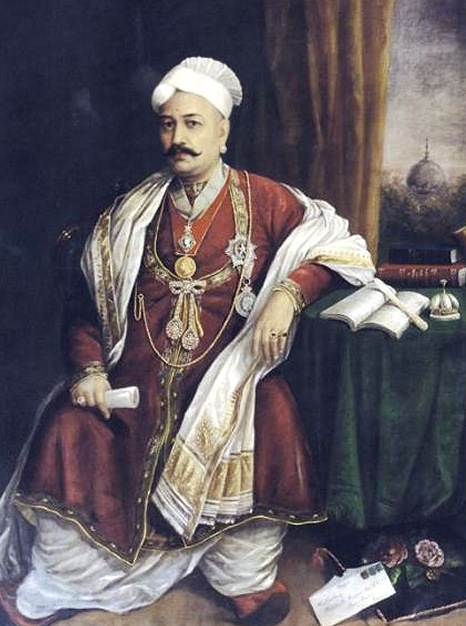
Portrait of Rao

In 1872, at the request of Tukojirao Holkar II of Indore, the Government of India persuaded Madhava Rao out of his retirement to take charge as the Diwan of Indore. Madhava Rao served as Diwan from 1873 to 1875, during which he commenced the drafting of the Indian Penal Code and wrote minutes on the opium question and the extension of railways in Indore. Shortly afterwards, the Government of India requested Madhava Rao to take over as Diwan-Regent of Baroda whose ruler Malhar Rao Gaekwad had been deposed for mal-administration.

Madhava Rao reformed the revenue administration of Baroda and curbed the power of revenue officials called Sirdars. The land rights of the Sirdars were cancelled and their lands were annexed by the state. During his tenure as Diwan-Regent, Madhava Rao also effectively re-organized the army, schools, courts of law and libraries. He also introduced a lot of town-planning measures.

Madhava Rao resigned in September 1882 due to disagreements with the new Maharaja Maharaja Sayajirao Gaekwad III. He retired to his home in Mylapore on pension.

== Struggle for first Constitution of an Indian Princely State ==
Many British civil servants in India who held positions within Indian princely states were disgusted by the total arbitrary power and laws of the Maharajas and Nawabs. In 1872, the retired Chief Commissioner of Mysore, Lewin Bentham Bowring had written in his memoir, Eastern Experience, that those

who sympathise most with Native States, and who have seen how they are administered, are conscious of the great risk to which their stability is subjected by idle or headstrong rulers seeking to set aside all law, and to act on the impulse of the moment.

Rao included this in his writing to the Viceroy, Francis Napier in March 1872, about the need for the implementation of a written constitution in princely states requesting “a system of fundamental principles, derived from the advanced political wisdom of Europe” while “carefully adapted to the conditions of the Native society” for the princely states.

Sir Madhav Rao drafted a model constitution for princely states of India in 1874 based on the principles of separation of power of the state and sent it to Lord Napier, Viceroy of India.

Some of the Key Provisions of the Charter or Constitution
	Provisions	Explanation
1	The Maharaja as Sovereign is the highest authority in his dominions	This requires no explanation.
2	The happiness of the people, as the foundation of the strength, durability, and happiness of the ruling Dynasty, shall be the paramount object of the Government of the country.	This may seem trite. Nevertheless, the full recognition of this important principle is of the highest use in Native States, where sovereigns are sometimes apt to forget if not controvert it. Hence, it is thus prominently laid down and, in a manner, to imply that the best interests of the Dynasty depend upon its faithful observance.
3	The Government of the country shall be carried on according to laws and customs, whether at present in force or established hereafter.	The object of this is obviously to do away with arbitrary Government altogether, and to induce the Government to conform its action to laws deliberately enacted and to customs established, in reference to public good alone.
4	A Darbar for making laws shall be organised, composed of men of wisdom, virtue, property, and patriotism, and such Darbar shall assist in the framing of useful laws from time to time and under rules to be hereafter laid down.	As the Government is to be carried on according to law, something like a properly constituted machinery for making laws becomes at once a necessity. I reserve the details as to the construction of this Darbar, only remarking at present that, without much difficulty, a body may be constituted which, though far from perfect, may be practically competent to frame useful laws. The Prime Minister will, of course, have to preside in this Darbar. The Darbar will be only a consultative body, and nothing framed by it can pass into law unless assented to by the Sovereign on the recommendation of the Dewan or Prime Minister after consultation with British Resident. Thus, no bad law can issue unless the Sovereign, the Dewan, the British Resident, and the Darbar all fail in their duty, a combination not likely to happen.
5	The laws in force at any time shall not be altered, modified, suspended, abolished, or in any way interfered with, except by other regularly enacted laws duly promulgated.	The object aimed at is the most important one of putting it out of the power of the Sovereign or the executive Government to interfere summarily or arbitrarily with the laws, by means of special orders, proclamations, &c., merely to suit a temporary or sinister purpose at the dictation of caprice, passion, or interest. This provision is absolutely necessary to ensure Government according to law. The student of the Political History of even England knows how important this provision is. I have framed this provision in reference to the following clause in the Bill of Rights or Declaration, delivered by English Lords and Commons to the Prince and Princess of Orange, 13 February 1688, namely, “that the pretended power of suspending of laws or the execution of laws by regal authority without consent of Parliament is illegal.” If such provision is required in England itself it is á fortiori[*] required in Oriental States, where there is a perpetual impatience of restraint and constant tendency to arbitrary rule. The effect of this provision will be that no laws will suffer alteration &c., unless by means of laws. In short, a character of fixity will be imparted to all existing laws, and a guarantee established that they shall not be altered, or in any manner interfered with, except for a really good and approved purpose.

His proposal was then forwarded by Lord Francis Napier to his successor, Viceroy, Lord Northbrook who dismissed it completely. Lord Northbrook fearing rebellion by princely states decided not to support proposals which could cause deep anguish among Indian princely states as countries like Russia, Germany and France were already trying to ally themselves with the princely states of India.

The princely state of Vadodara had faced many tumultuous years under Maharajah Malhar Rao Gaekwad. There had been multiple instances of gross violations of public order and private rights under the Gaekwad. The Gaekwad was involved in abducting married women and making them his slave or laundis in his palace. His tax collectors or vahivatadars were also given free hand to extort as much money from the ryots or tenants. He also implemented an exploitive and arbitrary system of nazranas or tributes on people.

Eventually, the entire situation started to unravel as the new British resident, Robert Phayre, came to Vadodara in 1873 who started to report back to the Viceroy, Lord Northbrook, about the situation in Vadodara. Lord Northbrook who did not want to upset the loyal princely states of India after the harrowing experience of revolt of 1857 decided to ignore the plea by Robert Phayre to remove the Maharajah. The British had already promised under Queen's Declaration of 1858 that they will restrain from occupying the loyal princely states.

Instead, the British formed a commission under Richard John Meade to look into the matter. The commission then recommended to the anguish of British that the Bombay should take the control of Vadodara. But, Bombay Legislative Council again rejected it vehemently with two of its members dissenting with the decision of the council - Henry Tucker, a judge at Bombay High Court and Alexander Rogers, a noted civil servant. According to Henry Tucker, the Calcutta must force “the Maharaja to give his subjects a written Constitution”. While Alexander Rogers said that “he had been shown the draft of a Constitution drawn up by an eminent Native Statesman (Sir Madhav Rao) of great experience” which he believed will work in India if some changes are made according to the Indian context.

Seemingly under pressure from Calcutta, the Gaekwad then decided to appoint Dadabhai Naoroji as the Dewan of Vadodara in 1873. But Dadabhai Naoroji was never able to control the situation as he was constantly undercut by the fellow durbaris who did not want any change in situation. So, he decided to resign and even, the Gaekwad was disposed as there were rumors about a conspiracy hatched by the Gaekwad to poison the British resident, Robert Phayre.(The Baroda Crisis)

Lord Northbrook then unwillingly appointed Sir Madhav Rao as the next dewan of Vadodara. But, Lord Northbrook also gave strict instructions to Sir Madhav Rao to restrict himself to administrative and economic reforms only.

Sir Madhav Rao tried to implement the political reforms he always wanted to implement at the end of his tenure with Lord Northbrook's successor, Lord Ripon. But, Lord Rippon also backtracked from the reforms when he faced strong opposition from the new Maharaja of Vadodra, Sayajirao Gaekwad. Sayajirao Gaekwad made it clear to the British authorities that he will not compromise with his royal authorities.

There were also strong opposition from other quarters against the proposal of reducing the total authority given to the Maharajas in the princely states. For conservatives, the total authority of Maharaja was culturally and politically imperative for the Indian states. Amrita Bazaar Patrika wrote articles against the proposal of Madhav Rao of giving a constitution to the state of Vadodara by claiming that subjects of Indian states

would prefer the sympathetic rule, though it might be despotic rule of the Prince, to the methodical but unsympathetic rule of a Dewan.

== Indian National Congress ==
Madhava Rao involved himself in politics in the later years of his life. He joined the Indian National Congress in 1887, two years after its formation. He served as the President of the Reception Committee during the 1887 Madras session. In 1888, he was offered a seat in the Imperial Legislative Council by the then Viceroy of India Lord Dufferin but Madhava Rao declined the offer on ground of health.

While delivering the inaugural address during the 1887 session, Madhava Rao described the Indian National Congress as

..the soundest triumph of British administration and a crown of glory to the great British nation.

However, at the same time, he warned that

The great experience of Europe has shown that representative government contains mucnh good and much evil. In introducing it into India, therefore, responsible British statesmen have to exercise great care and caution, that the good is produced and evil is excluded. In these circumstances it might be wrong to introduce that system into India at once, mereley because the Congress asks for it. It is absolutely necessary to take measures gradually, and tentatively

On June 2, 1883, he wrote the article – “Native Political Development” in Times of India.

Nothing really would be a more disastrous calamity to India than the English should abandon her before she become to take care of herself.

Madhava Rao resigned from the Standing Committee in 1889 due to differences with other members over the resolution passed on reformed legislative councils.

In an article written after his death in Times of India on April 13, 1891, the article talks about his position regarding Congress.

Like many others sincerely wishing for the country's good, he hailed at first the idea of Congress, as a mean of political enlightment for the people and, as a true and sober interpreter of the voice of the people, and like many others his sympathies alienated from it, when he perceived that it had a tendency to assume the character of a political crusade.

== Later life ==
In his later years, Madhava Rao strove to reform the educational system. Even while serving as Diwan of Baroda, Rao was made a fellow of the Madras University. He campaigned in support of women's education and attacked child marriage. He also criticised the literal interpretation of Hindu shastras. However, Madhava Rao was, till the end, a pacifist and was moderate and unreactionary in his views on social reforms.

In 1885, at the request of the then Governor of Madras, Mountstuart Elphinstone Grant-Duff, Madhava Rao presided over the Malabar Land Tenure Commission. In 1887, he presided over the convocation of the Madras University. In December 1887, Madhava Rao presided over the inaugural session of Indian National Social Conference.

Madhava Rao took a liking for British sociologist and political theorist Herbert Spencer and spent the last days of his life studying his works. He contributed articles to newspapers on a variety of topics ranging from politics and religion to astronomy. Under the pseudonyms "Native Thinker" and "Native Observer", Madhava Rao wrote opinion pieces on the German colonisation of Africa and on the dress code to be adopted by Hindu women in public. He forwarded his complimentary article on German colonialism in Africa to German Chancellor Otto von Bismarck, who replied with a letter of acknowledgement and appreciation. In 1889, he published a pamphlet titled "Hints on the training of native children by a native Thinker" which was translated into various Indian languages as Gujarati, Marathi and Malayalam. He also composed a few small poems in Tamil.

Towards the end of his life, Madhava Rao was affected by health problems. On 22 December 1890, he suffered a stroke at his Mylapore home. Madhava Rao died three months later, on 4 April 1891 at the age of sixty-three.

== Family ==
The Rao family proved successful in civil administration in general. T. Madhava Rao married Yamuna Bai. The couple had five children, three sons, T. Ananda Rao, Ranga Rao, Ramchandra Rao; two daughters, Balubai and Ambabai. T. Ananda Rao, the eldest son of Madhava Rao, served as the Diwan of Mysore from 1909 to 1912. Madhava Rao's cousin R. Raghunatha Rao, served as the Diwan of Baroda and was also an early leader of the Indian National Congress. Another cousin of his, T. Rama Rao was the Diwan of Travancore from 1887 to 1892. T. Ananda Rao was married to Rama Rao's daughter Soundara Bai.

== Titles and awards ==
- Fellow of the Madras University - 1862
- Knight Commander of the Star of India - 1866
- Title of Rajah - 1868

== Books ==
Books written on T. Madhava Rao and his Administration:

- Raja Sir T. Madhava Rao: A Brief Sketch and Review of His Eventful Life and Career as the Administrator of the Three Leading Native States in India, Travancore, Indore and Baroda, G.S. Maniya & Company, 1915
- Raja Sir T. Madhava Rao and the Modernization of Travancore Administration, P. Abraham Koshy, University of Kerala, 1977
- Diwan Sir Thanjavur Madhava Row: Life and Times of Statesman, Administrator Extraordinaire, Bharatiya Vidya Bhavan, 2015, Urmila Rau Lal ISBN 978-8172765262

Books written by T. Madhava Rao:

- Minor Hints; Lectures Delivered to H. H. the Maharaja Gaekwar, Sayaji Rao III, Hardpress Publishing, 2012, ISBN 978-1290532907

== Bibliography ==
- Lal, Urmila Rau (2015), Diwan Sir Thanjavur Madhava Row:Life and Times of Statesman, Administrator Extraordinaire, Bharatiya Vidya Bhavan, ISBN 978-8172765262
- Solomon, R. V.; Bond, J. W. (2006), Indian States: A Biographical, Historical, and Administrative Survey, Asian Educational Services, ISBN 978-8120619654
- Buckland, C. E. (1971), Dictionary of Indian Biography, Ardent Media
- Lethbridge, Sir Roper (2005), The Golden Book of India: A Genealogical and Biographical Dictionary of the Ruling Princes, Chiefs, Nobles, and Other Personages, Titled Or Decorated of the Indian Empire, Aakar Books, ISBN 978-8187879541
- Aiyangar, Srinivasa Ramanujan (1995), Ramanujan: Letters and Commentary, American Mathematical Society, Bibcode:1995rlc..book.....B, ISBN 978-0821891254
- Chandra, Sudhir (2014), The Oppressive Present: Literature and Social Consciousness in Colonial India, Routledge, ISBN 978-1317559931
- Hemingway, F. R. (2002), Tanjore Gazetteer, Genesis Publishing, ISBN 978-8170209683
