= Reddy Row =

Diwan and administrator of Tranvancore

Diwan of Travancore
- In office September 1817 – 1821
- Monarch: Swathi Thirunal
- Preceded by: Raman Menon
- Succeeded by: T. Venkata Rao
- In office 1843–1845
- Monarch: Swathi Thirunal
- Preceded by: Krishna Rao
- Succeeded by: Srinivasa Rao

Reddy Row (born Venkata Row, also known as Reddy Royar) was an Indian administrator who served as the Diwan of Travancore from 1817 to 1821 and 1843 to 1845.

== Early life ==
Reddy Row was born in a Thanjavur Marathi Deshastha Madhva Brahmin family at Kumbakonam. When John Munroe became the Diwan of Travancore in 1811, Reddy Row joined the Travancore service as accountant and helped reorganise the Accounts Department of the kingdom.

== Diwan of Travancore ==
Reddy Row became the Diwan of Travancore in September 1817. He was a protégé of John Munroe and worked on his behalf to introduce reforms. Soon after taking over, Reddy Row passed royal proclamations relieving Christians from compulsory donations towards Hindu ceremonies and exempting them from working on Sundays. He also removed restrictions on low-caste Hindus from wearing gold and silver ornaments and jewellery and introduced coffee cultivation and vaccination. However, when the princess Rukmini Bayi married in 1820, Reddy Row made lavish arrangements for the wedding and was given the villages of Shambhur and Vadakar in Shencottah taluk by the rani in return. This scandalised the Travancore court and Venkata Rao complained about the Diwan to the new Resident, Col. Newall, thereby forcing him to resign.

When Subha Rao resigned as Diwan in 1843, his protégé Krishna Row was made acting Diwan. He was supported by the British resident at Travancore. But as the Maharaja was not satisfied with him, he expressed his opinion on Krishna Row to the Governor of Madras, who had Reddy Row appointed as Diwan once again, to the chagrin of the Resident.

Reddy Row served his second term as Diwan from 1843 to 1845. This period was characterized by increasing bitterness between the Maharaja and the Resident. In 1845, General Cullen allegedly engineered the downfall of the Diwan by charging him with receiving bribes and presents. An inquiry was launched in the Diwan's conduct, and he was compelled to resign.

== Notes ==
Preceded by Raman Menon	Diwan of Travancore; 1817–1821	Succeeded by T. Venkata Rao
Preceded by Krishna Rao (acting)	Diwan of Travancore; 1843–1845	Succeeded by Srinivasa Rao
