= Y. S. Rao =

Microwave remote sensing specialist

- యలమంచిలి సుబ్రహ్మణ్యేశ్వర రావు
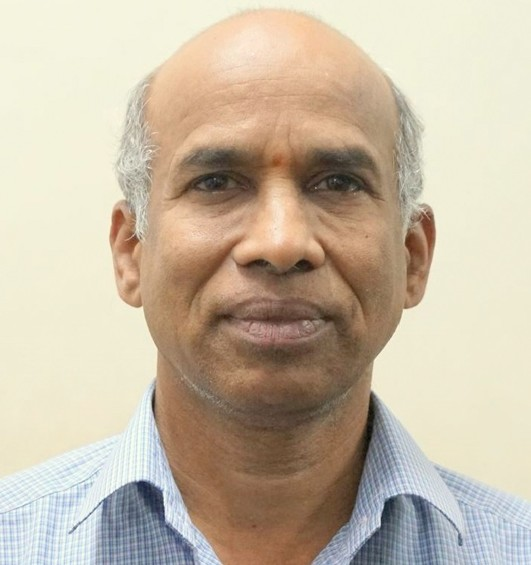
- Born: Garikaparru, India
- Citizenship: India
- Education: Andhra University; IIT Bombay
- Known for: Synthetic Aperture Radar (SAR) interferometry, Satellite crop monitoring, Soil moisture
- Scientific career
- Fields: Radar remote sensing
- Workplaces: IIT Bombay
- Thesis: (1992)
- Website: http://www.csre.iitb.ac.in/ysrao

Dr. Y. S. Rao (Yalamanchili Subrahmanyewara Rao) is a professor at the Centre of Studies in Resources Engineering, Indian Institute of Technology Bombay, Mumbai, India. He has been working in the field of microwave remote sensing and land-based applications for more than four decades. His early research focused on the use of Synthetic Aperture Radar (SAR) interferometry for landslides and land deformation monitoring, Digital Elevation Model generation, and snow and glacier monitoring. He has also been actively involved in developing several techniques for soil moisture estimation using passive and active microwave remote sensing data for more than 25 years. His current research involves SAR Polarimetry for crop characterization, classification, and biophysical parameter retrieval using linear and compact-pol SAR data. Apart from applications, he has also contributed to the field of Polarimetric SAR system calibration and software tool development.

== Education ==
Rao received the M.Sc. degree in physics from Andhra University, Visakhapatnam, India, in 1982, and the Ph.D. degree in passive microwave remote sensing of soil moisture from the Indian Institute of Technology (IIT) Bombay, Mumbai, India, in 1992.

== Professional career ==
He joined the Centre of Studies in Resources Engineering, Indian Institute of Technology Bombay, in 1985, as a senior research assistant and then became a research scientist in 1999. During 2005–2009, he was a senior research scientist and then associate professor from 2009 to 2014. He is currently a professor since 2015. He was engaged in both passive and active microwave remote sensing for several applications viz. soil moisture, flood mapping, and crop inventory mapping. He has participated in several space borne campaigns for collecting synchronous ground-truth data and has experience in handling various data set for several applications of cryosphere, agriculture, soil moisture, and water-resources. His current research interests include application of polarimetry for geophysical parameter retrieval and SAR interferometry for DEM and land deformation.

He is actively involved in teaching several courses including Principles of Remote Sensing, Microwave Remote Sensing, Atmospheric Remote Sensing, Advanced Concepts in Polarimetric SAR Data Analysis for M.Tech. and Ph.D. students for the last 12 years. He is also invited for lectures/training programs in several Institutes/Universities. He has conducted numerous training programmes for Indians on SAR and InSAR related activities as a member of task group, and also organized international programmes with the help of DLR Germany, CNES France and University of Cape Town, South Africa.

He supervises doctoral and masters research on both PolSAR and InSAR applications. Dr. Rao is the principal and co-principal investigator of numerous projects sponsored by European Space Agency (ESRIN/ESA); German Aerospace Centre (DLR); the Department of Science and Technology (DST), Government of India; Snow & Avalanche Study Estt (SASE), Defence Electronics Application Laboratory (DEAL), Electronics and Radar Development Establishment (LRDE)- Defense Research and Development Organization (DRDO), Government of India; Indian Space Research Organization (ISRO); Society for Applied Microwave Electronics Engineering & Research (SAMEER), Ministry of Electronics & Information Technology, Government of India; and GEOGLAM-JECAM SAR Inter-Comparison Experiment. He has authored more than 100 scientific publications in refereed international-national journals and conference proceedings.
