= Krishna Rao (administrator) =

Indian politician

Vemuri Krishna Rao

Diwan of Travancore(Acting)
- In office 1842–1843
- Monarch: Uthram Thirunal Marthanda Varma
- Preceded by: Thanjavur Subha Rao
- Succeeded by: Reddy Row

Diwan of Travancore
- In office 1846–1857
- Monarch: Uthram Thirunal Marthanda Varma
- Preceded by: Srinivasa Rao
- Succeeded by: T. Madhava Rao

Personal details
- Occupation: Administrator

Vemuri Krishna Rao (died 1857) was an Indian administrator who served as the acting Diwan of Travancore from 1842 to 1843 and the full-fledged Diwan from 1846 to 1857. After the death of Vemuri Krishna Rao in 1857, T. Madhava Rao was chosen to the high office of dewan by the Maharaja of Travancore.
