= Sheristadar =

Former chief administrative officer role in Indian courts

A sheristadar was once the chief administrative officer in Indian courts entrusted with the tasking of receiving and checking court pleas. The word is derived from the Persian word sarishta-dār meaning "Administrative Officer of the court". They were responsible for the entire district judicial administration through the Principal District & Sessions Court, supervising all activities including record keeping

There were two categories of sherishtadar: a Category I sherishtadar was a senior official in the Principal District Court, and a Category II sherishtadar was a more junior official in the sub-courts. In the High Court the sherishtadar is named as Registrar General.
