= B. A. Gupte =

Indian anthropologist (1851-1925)

Balkrishna Atmaram Gupte (1851–1925) was an anthropologist in British India. He was an honorary fellow of the Royal Society of Arts.

== Career ==
Gupte was the assistant Director of Ethnography of India under Sir Herbert Hope Risley. He was elected an Honorary Fellow of the Royal Society of Arts, London. He was the author of "Hindu Holidays And Ceremonials" and several other books. Later, he was a professor at Calcutta. He was awarded the title "Rai Bahadur".
