= R. Ranga Rao (administrator) =

Diwan of Travancore

Rai Ranga Rao

Diwan of Travancore
- In office 1837–1838
- Monarch: Swathi Thirunal
- Preceded by: T. Subba Row
- Succeeded by: R. Venkata Rao

Personal details
- Born: T. Ranga Rao Kumbakonam

Rai Ranga Rao was (born T. Ranga Rao, also spelt Ranga Row) was an Indian administrator and statesman who served as Diwan of Travancore 1837–1838. He was the father of Sir T. Madhava Rao, brother of R. Venkata Rao and paternal uncle of R. Raghunatha Rao.

Preceded by Subba Row	Diwan of Travancore; 1837–1838	Succeeded by R. Venkata Rao
