= T. Subha Rao =

Diwan of Travancore

Thanjavur Subha Rao

Diwan of Travancore
- In office 1830–1837
- Monarch: Swathi Thirunal
- Preceded by: T. Venkata Rao
- Succeeded by: R. Ranga Rao
- In office 1839 – June 1842
- Monarch: Swathi Thirunal
- Preceded by: T. Venkata Rao
- Succeeded by: Krishna Rao

Thanjavur Subha Rao (also known as Subharao Tanjavarkar, also spelled Subba Row) was an Indian administrator and musician who served as the dewan of the state of Travancore in the 1830s.

Subha Rao was a native of Thanjavur and was born into a Thanjavur Marathi Deshastha Brahmin family. He was so fluent in English that he was also known as "English" Subha Rao. He tutored the Maharaja of Travancore Swathi Thirunal in Sanskrit, Marathi, political science and Carnatic music. In 1830, he was appointed Dewan of Travancore. His Western knowledge and refinement in the English language led to East India Company officers attempting to send him away, as he was "not unacquainted" with the policies they were pursuing in conquering India.
