= R. Venkata Rao =

Diwan of Travancore

Rai Raya Rai Venkata Rao
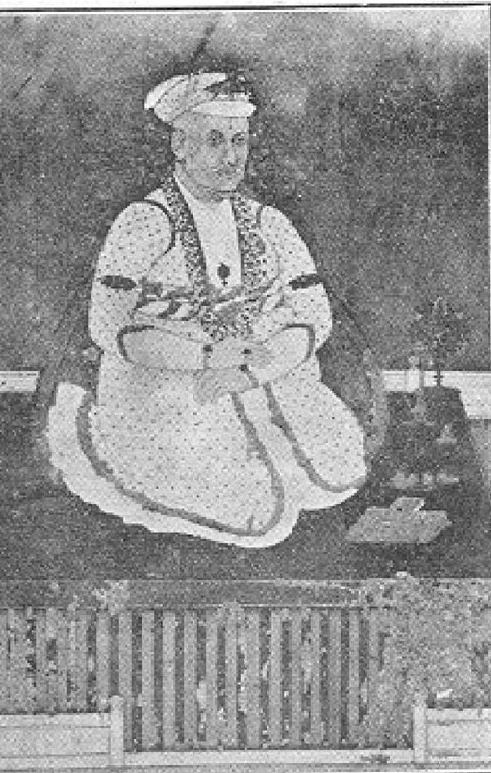

Diwan of Travancore
- In office 1821–1829
- Preceded by: Reddy Row
- Succeeded by: Thanjavur Subha Rao
- In office 1838–1839
- Monarch: Swathi Thirunal
- Preceded by: R. Ranga Rao
- Succeeded by: Thanjavur Subha Rao

Personal details
- Born: T. Venkata Rao
- Died: 1843

Rai Raya Rai Venkata Rao (born T. Venkata Rao, also spelt Venkatta Row; died 1843), was an Indian administrator and statesman who served as Diwan of Travancore 1821–1829 and 1838–39. He was the father of R. Raghunatha Rao, brother of R. Ranga Rao and paternal uncle of Sir T. Madhava Rao.

== Early life ==
He was born in Coombaconum in the Thanjavur Maratha Kingdom to Gundopanth Kumbhakoni in a Thanjavur Marathi Deshastha Madhva Brahmin family.

== Public life ==
Venkata Rao served as the Head Sheristadar to the Chief Commissioner of Mysore 1834–38 and as Assistant Chief Commissioner of Mysore 1840–42. In 1842, he was appointed Diwan of Hyderabad and served till 1843, when he returned to Bangalore due to ill-health.

== Diwan of Travancore ==
In 1819, Venkata Rao joined the Travancore state service as an assistant to Colonel McDowall, the British resident. He impressed the Queen-regent of Travancore by his abilities, and was soon appointed Diwan Peishkar or Governor of one of the divisions of the Travancore kingdom. During his tenure as Diwan Peishkar, Venkata Rao repaired and refurbished the Padmanabhaswamy Temple in Trivandrum and modified the dress codes of the sepoys.

In 1821, the Diwan, Reddy Row, accepted a jagir of two villages from the queen; Venkata Rao and his ally, the immediately preceding Diwan Raman Menon Dalawa, managed to oust and replace Row in the scandal.

On taking office, Venkata Rao immediately waived taxes. He set up his base at Quilon and organised a number of irrigation works. The Kadinangulam backwaters were created during his tenure.

== Honours ==
Venkata Rao was given the title "Rai Raaya Rai" in 1838 in recognition of his services to the Crown.

== Sources ==
- "A comprehensive website on the life and music of Swati Thirunal".

Preceded by Reddy Row	Diwan of Travancore; 1821 - 1829	Succeeded by Thanjavur Subha Rao
Preceded by R. Ranga Rao	Diwan of Travancore; 1838 - 1839	Succeeded by Thanjavur Subha Rao
