= Kerala State Department of Archaeology =

Archaeology department of the Government of Kerala

- Formation: 1962
- Type: Government agency
- Headquarters: Thiruvananthapuram, Kerala, India
- Minister for Archeology: O. J. Janeesh
- Director: E.Dinesan
- Parent organisation: Cultural Affairs Department, Govt of Kerala
- Website: archaeology.kerala.gov.in

Kerala State Department of Archaeology is the archaeology department of the Government of Kerala. It had its origins in the Travancore State Archaeology Department which was started in December 1891. It forms a part of the Ministry of Culture. The department was formed in 1962 integrating the Travancore Archaeology Department and the Archaeological Research Centre of erstwhile Kochi. The main functions of the department includes publishing of volumes on stone inscriptions discovered from various places, copying of copper plate inscriptions, conducting excavations and explorations and measures to protect historical monuments dating back to 200 BC onwards which lies scattered in different parts of the state.

== Museums ==
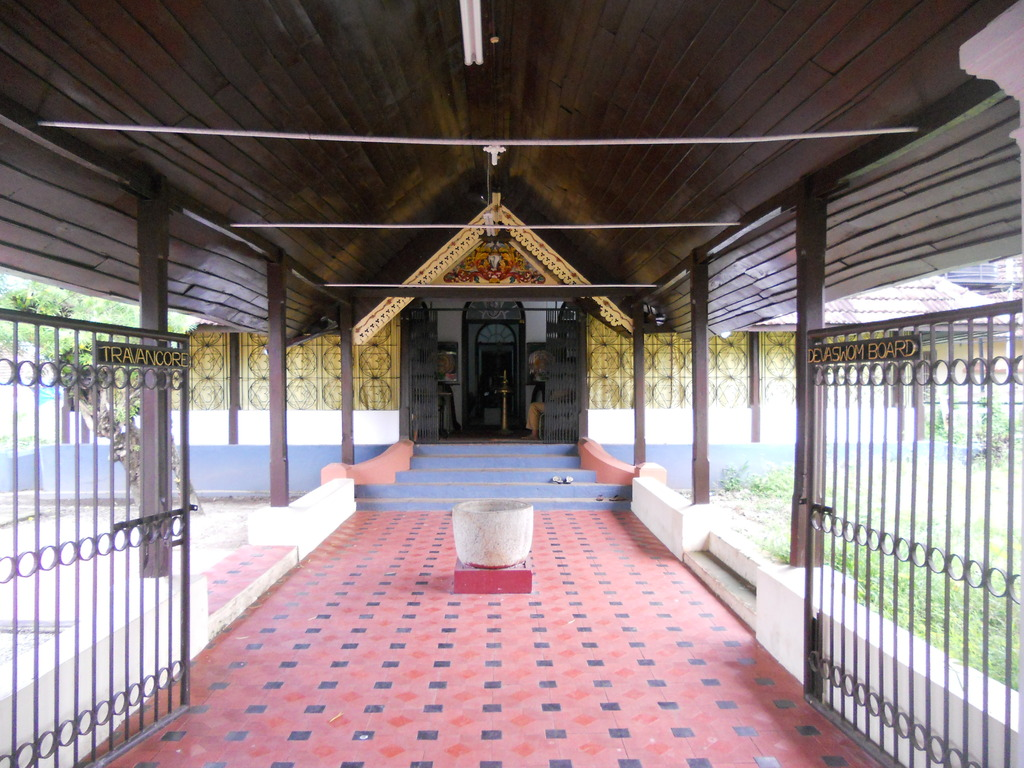
Kottarakkara Thampuran Memorial Classical Arts Museum

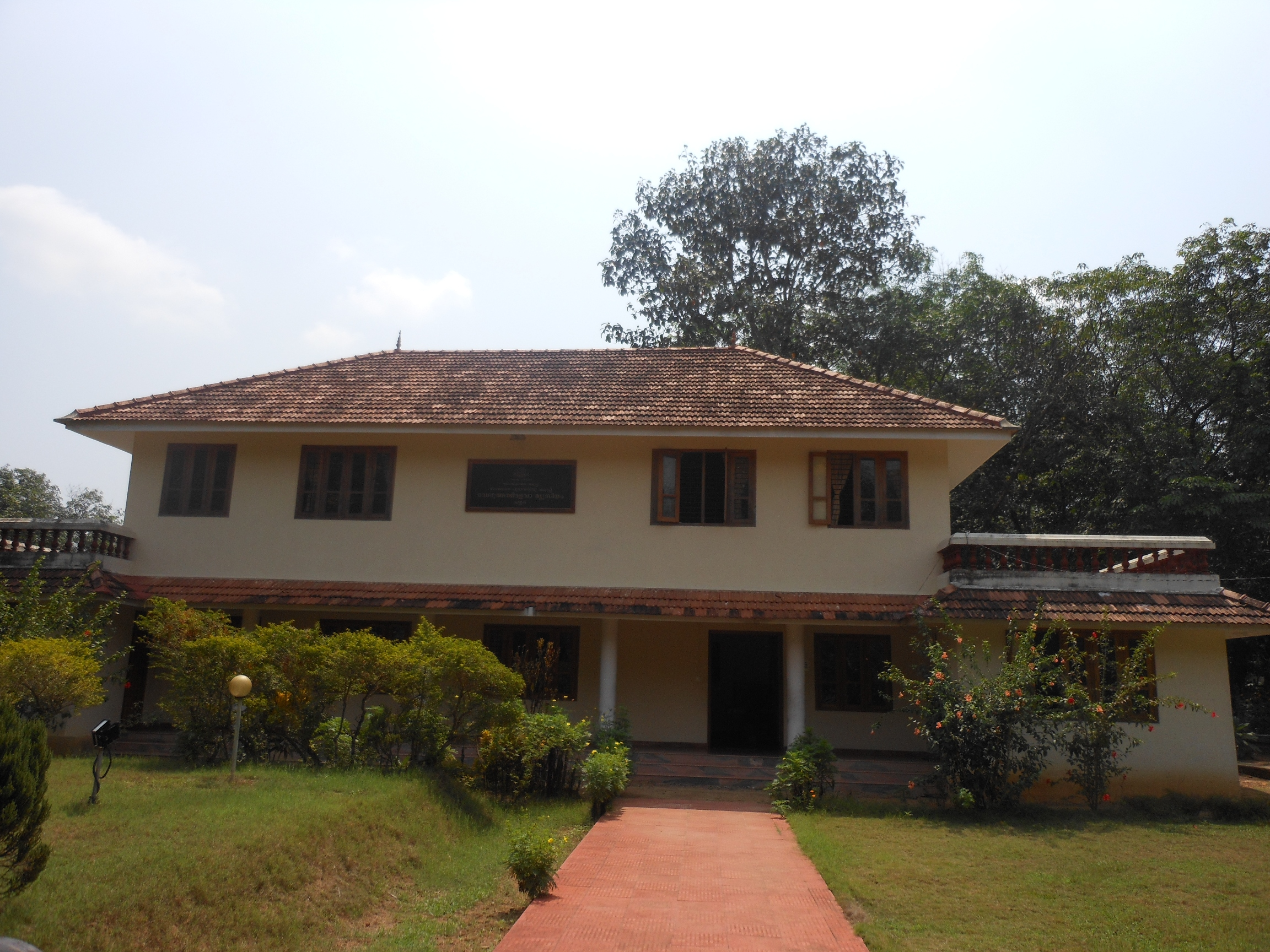
Veluthampi Dalawa Memorial Museum, Mannadi

The following are museums under the Archaeology Department.

- Pazhassi Tomb
- Kunjali Marakkar Memorial Museum, Iringal
- Pazhassi Raja Archaeological Museum
- Archaeological Museum, Thrissur
- Mural Art Museum
- Chendamangalam Synagogue
- Hill Palace Museum
- Krishnapuram Palace
- Kottarakkara Thampuran Memorial Classical Arts Museum
- Veluthampi Dalawa Memorial Museum, Mannadi
- Koyikkal Palace
- Padmanabhapuram Palace
- Palm Leaf Manuscript Museum, Thiruvananthapuram, the world's first and largest palm leaf manuscript museum.
