= Lal Bahadur Shastri Stadium =

Lal Bahadur Shastri Stadium may refer to:

- Lal Bahadur Shastri Stadium, Hyderabad, a multi-purpose stadium in Hyderabad, India
- Lal Bahadur Shastri Stadium, Kollam, a multi-purpose stadium in Kollam, India
