= QAC Road =

Road in India

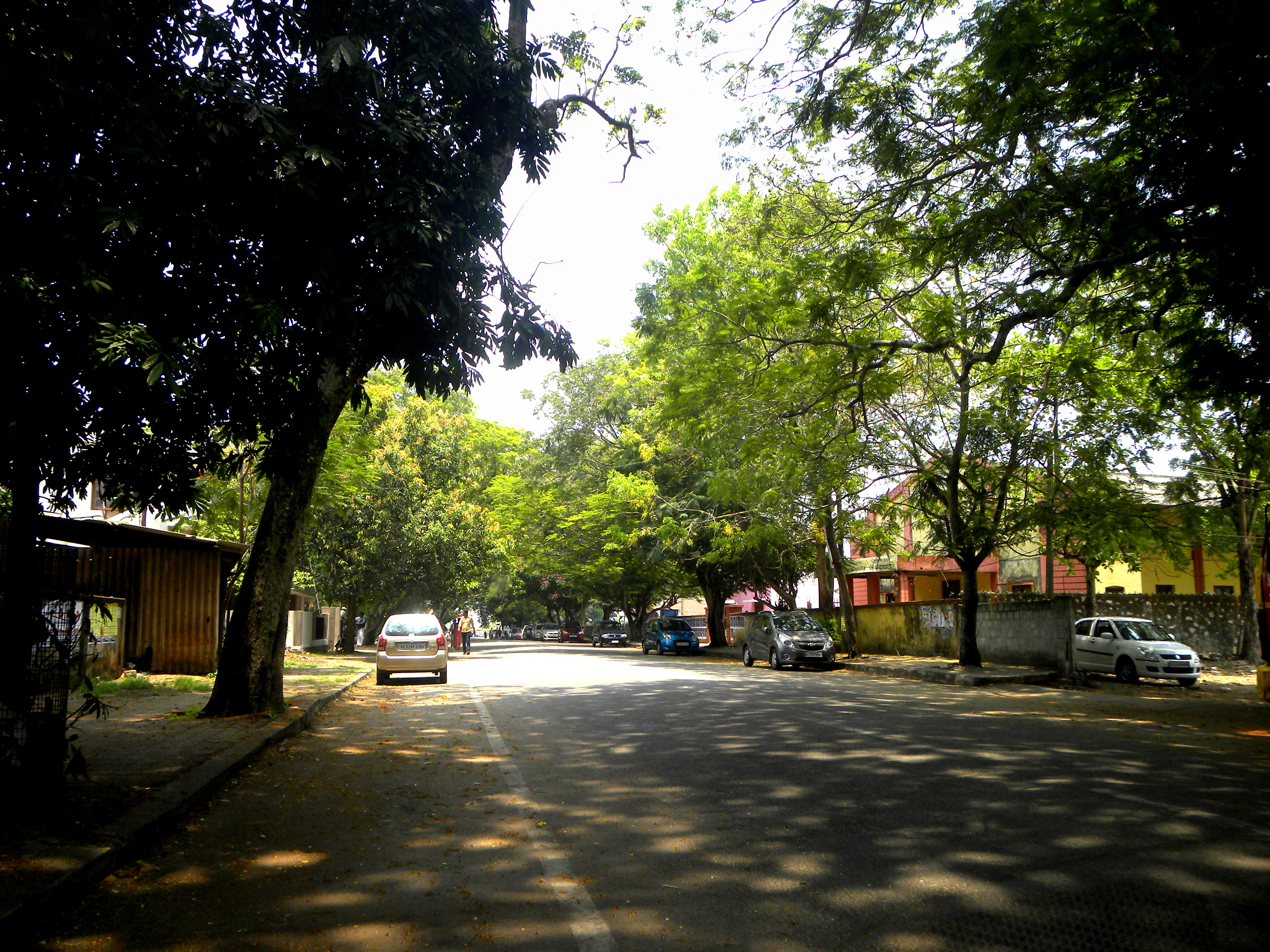
- QAC Road near LBS Stadium
- Length: 0.365 km (0.227 mi)
- South end: NH-66 in ARPF Camp Junction
- North end: Kollam-Kulathupuzha road in Railway Junction

The QAC Road or Quilon Athletic Club Road is a short city road in Kollam, India. The road connects decades-old 'Quilon Athletic Club' and Lal Bahadur Shastri Stadium with NH-66 and Kollam-Kulathupuzha road through Kollam Cantonment area. QAC Road is considered as a major district road comes under Kollam PWD Roads Division. Southern Railways' Staff Quarters is situated on the side of QAC Road.

== Local public and private institutions beside QAC Road ==
- Lal Bahadur Shastri Stadium
- Quilon Athletic Club
- Railways Staff Quarters
- Kerala Water Authority Office

== See also ==
- Kollam
- Asramam Link Road
- Residency Road
- Kollam Port Road
