= Palm Leaf Manuscript Museum, Thiruvananthapuram =

Museum in India

Palm Leaf Manuscript Museum
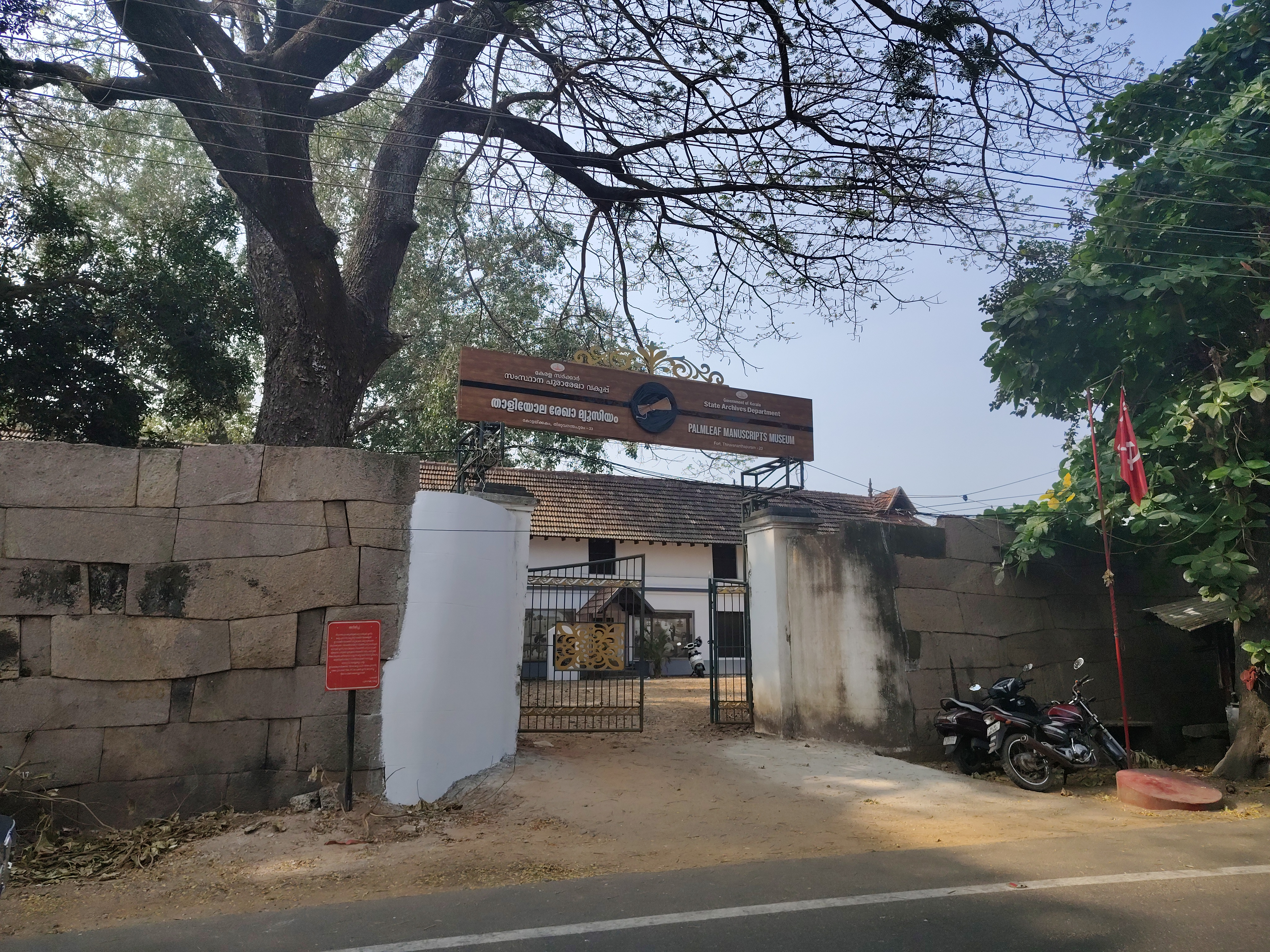
- Established: 2022
- Location: Thiruvananthapuram, Kerala, India
- Coordinates: 8.4862°N 76.9403°E
- Type: History museum
- Collections: Palm-leaf manuscripts
- Owners: Department of Archeology, Government of Kerala

Palm Leaf Manuscript Museum, Thiruvananthapuram is museum dedicated to preserve and exhibit palm-leaf manuscripts from Kerala. It is considered as world's first and largest palm-leaf manuscript museum. The museum houses a rare collection of over one crore palm leaves held by the Kerala State Department of Archaeology, containing administrative records dating back to the Venad period and past political and social information from Travancore, Cochin and Malabar regions. The museum contains palm leaf manuscripts from 1249 to 1896.

== Overview ==
Palm Leaf Manuscript Museum located in Thiruvananthapuram is a museum dedicated to preserve and exhibit palm-leaf manuscripts from ancient Kerala. This is the world's first and largest palm leaf manuscript museum. The museum has a collection of over one crore palm leaves dating back to the 14th century. The museum house palm leaf collection held by the Department of Archaeology, which contains records of administration, purchases and sales, medical procedures, punishments, servitude, agriculture, agricultural culture, economy, lease, tax reform, and tax collection from the Venad, Travancore and Cochin kingdoms. J. Rejikumar, head of the Directorate of Archives, said that there are palm leaves from six centuries, from 1249 to 1896.

The museum also displays transliteration of palm leaves in ancient scripts like Vattezhuthu, Kolezhuthu, and Malayanma. Through this, the writing in the ancient script can be read in Malayalam and English languages, without having to translate it. The evolution of traditional writing system in Malayalam is also exhibited in the museum. The museum also have a section of documents that explain the writing materials used in the ancient writing system in Kerala and how ordinary people used to record their purchases and sales. Samples of palm leaves from various places like the Padmanabhapuram Palace is also displayed here. To protect the palm leaves from damage, they are placed inside special boxes, with the contents, script, and language of each one written on top, along with appropriate pictures. The work of digitizing and preserving the documents in the possession of the Archaeological Department is also in progress.

The museumhas eight theme-based galleries set up for visitors. The first gallery, 'The History of Writing', tells how the Malayalam script was formed, starting with the Brahmi script. The second gallery contains palm leaves containing lease agreements, purchase and sale documents, and records of the construction of canals, dams, and ditches for agriculture.

The next galleries contain palm leaf documents on tax collection, tax reform, the abolition of some harmful taxes, a document ensuring employment for poor women, a document on the purchase of two lakh palm leaves from Kollam Karipra, a document on the collection of fines for those who arrived late to the office, a document on the allocation of money for the construction of prisons, documents on Attingal Rebellion of 1721, the Kulachal War of 1741, the British-Venad Treaties of 1723 and 1805, and other past wars and treaties made thereafter. Documents on establishment of government schools, the opening of new English schools, the establishment of hospitals, the preventive measures against epidemics such as smallpox and cholera, and the death toll, the observance of social distancing like today's Covid, the taking of loans from the Cochin treasury, the pepper trade, the riot-fighting activities during the Swathi Thirunal period, and the riots in Cochin, etc. are all in the following galleries. The palm leaf collection also includes a document requesting 2,000 guns from the Kingdom of Cochin to Travancore in 1780, an order to find Velu Thampi Dalawa, the Thrippadadanam of Marthanda Varma in 1750, and the names of villages given by the Pandya king to the King of Kottarakkara in 1239.

The last gallery, Mathilakam Records, contains many documents about the Sree Padmanabhaswamy Temple, the art, culture, law, and administration of the Travancore kingdom.

== History ==
The museum is located in a 300-year-old building from Travancore period. During the Travancore period, the museum building served as a base for Nair soldiers. Later, the building was converted into prison. When a new prison building was built in Poojappura in 1886, all the convicts were shifted there. Since then, this place has become a place to keep the official records of Travancore, the Hazur Vernacular Records. When the Kerala Archaeological Department was formed in 1964, it became a place to collect and store palm leaves under it.

The Palm Leaf Museum has been set up in eight galleries on an area of 6,000 square feet at a cost of Rs 3 crore at the Central Archives Building, the Thiruvananthapuram regional office of the Archaeological Department. The Palm Leaf Museum was inaugurated by Chief Minister Pinarayi Vijayan on 22 December 2022. Since 2022, the entire ground floor has been converted into museum. Out of more than 10 million palm leaf manuscripts, the ground floor displays 187 manuscripts with additional information and transliterations, in different galleries. On the upper floor, a large collection of palm leaves is being preserved in scrolls. The public, except for researchers, is not allowed to access them.

== Location ==
The Palm Leaf Museum is located near Fort Hospital in Thiruvananthapuram city.
