= QAC =

QAC may refer to:

- Helix QAC, a commercial static code analysis software tool produced by Perforce Software
- QAC Road, a short city road in Kollam, India
- Quaternary ammonium cation, positively-charged polyatomic ions of the structure [NR_{4}]^{+}
- Queen Alexandra College, an independent specialist college of further education based in Harborne, Birmingham
- Queen Anne's County, Maryland, in the United States
- Quilmes Atlético Club, an Argentine sports club based in Quilmes, Buenos Aires
