= Olympian Suresh Babu Multipurpose Indoor Stadium =

Sports venue in Kollam, India

Olympian Suresh Babu Memorial Multipurpose Indoor Stadium
- Kollam Indoor Stadium
- Interactive map of Olympian Suresh Babu Memorial Multipurpose Indoor Stadium
- Address: Cantonment Maidan; Kollam; India
- Location: Kerala
- Coordinates: 8.8815°N 76.6004°E
- Owner: Directorate Of Sports & Youth Affairs Kerala
- Main venue: Capacity: 2,500
- Facilities: Swimming Pools, Dressing Rooms, 21 Rooms, VIP Rooms, Hostel for 150 pax, Toilet Complexes, Press Gallery
- Acreage: 43
- Public transit: Kollam Junction 1.1 km
- Parking: Yes

Construction
- Groundbreaking: Feb 2021
- Opened: 2025
- Cost: ₹42.72 crore (US$4.4 million)
- Project manager: KITCO Ltd.

Kollam Indoor Stadium or Olympian Suresh Babu Multipurpose Indoor Stadium is a stadium in making around the Cantonment area of Kollam. The construction process is supposed to be completed by December, 2023 at a cost of Rs 39 crore on 3.6 acres of land allocated by the government at Peerangi Maidan in the center of Kollam city, with seating for two thousand people, a men's hostel for 100 athletes training in 21 sports, and a swimming pool.
