= Jayanthan Sankaran Nampoothiri =

Diwan of Travencore

Odiery Jayanthan Sankaran Nampoothiri was an 18th-century Dalawa of the Travancore, a former Indian kingdom.

== Background ==
Jayanthan Nampoothiri was a migrant from Zamorin kingdom who settled in Travancore during Tipu Sultan's invasion. Having the experience of working in Zamorin's palace, Nampoothiri could earn respect from Travancore royal family also.

== Rise to and fall from power ==
Soon after the death of Dharma Raja Karthika Thirunal Rama Varma on 17 February 1798, Balarama Varma was enthroned as Maharaja of Travancore. Bala Rama Varma was one of Travancore's least popular sovereigns whose reign was marked by unrest and various internal and external problems to the state. He became King at the young age of sixteen and came under the influence of Jayanthan Nampoothiri. One of the first acts of atrocities during his reign was the murder of Raja Kesavadas, the existing Dewan of Travancore on 21 April 1799. Jayanthan Nampoothiri was appointed as new Dewan. Sankara Narayanan Pillai of Thuckalay and Thachil Matthoo Tharakan assisted Nampoothiri. Due to their corruption, soon the treasury was empty. Jayanthan Nampoothiri decided to collect large sums of money from the people for the treasury. This resulted in a revolt led by Velu Thampi. Maharaja dismissed Dewan and his associates on 6th Mithunam 974 Malayalam Era (June 1799 AD) even before they complete a month in their offices. Ayyappan Chempaka Raman Pillai from Chirayinkeezhu was appointed as new Dewan and Velu Thampi, as commerce minister.

Later when he was appointed as Dewan, Velu Thampi wreaked his vengeance on Jayanthan Nampoothiri and his assistants. Jayanthan Nampoothiri was banished and never recalled. Tharakan and Sankara Narayanan were publicly flogged and have their ears cut off. Tharakan was imprisoned at Trivandrum, while Sankara Narayanan was sent to be confined at Udayagiri Fort.
