= Cantonment Maidan =

Historical ground in Kerala, India

Cantonment Maidan Peeranki Maidan
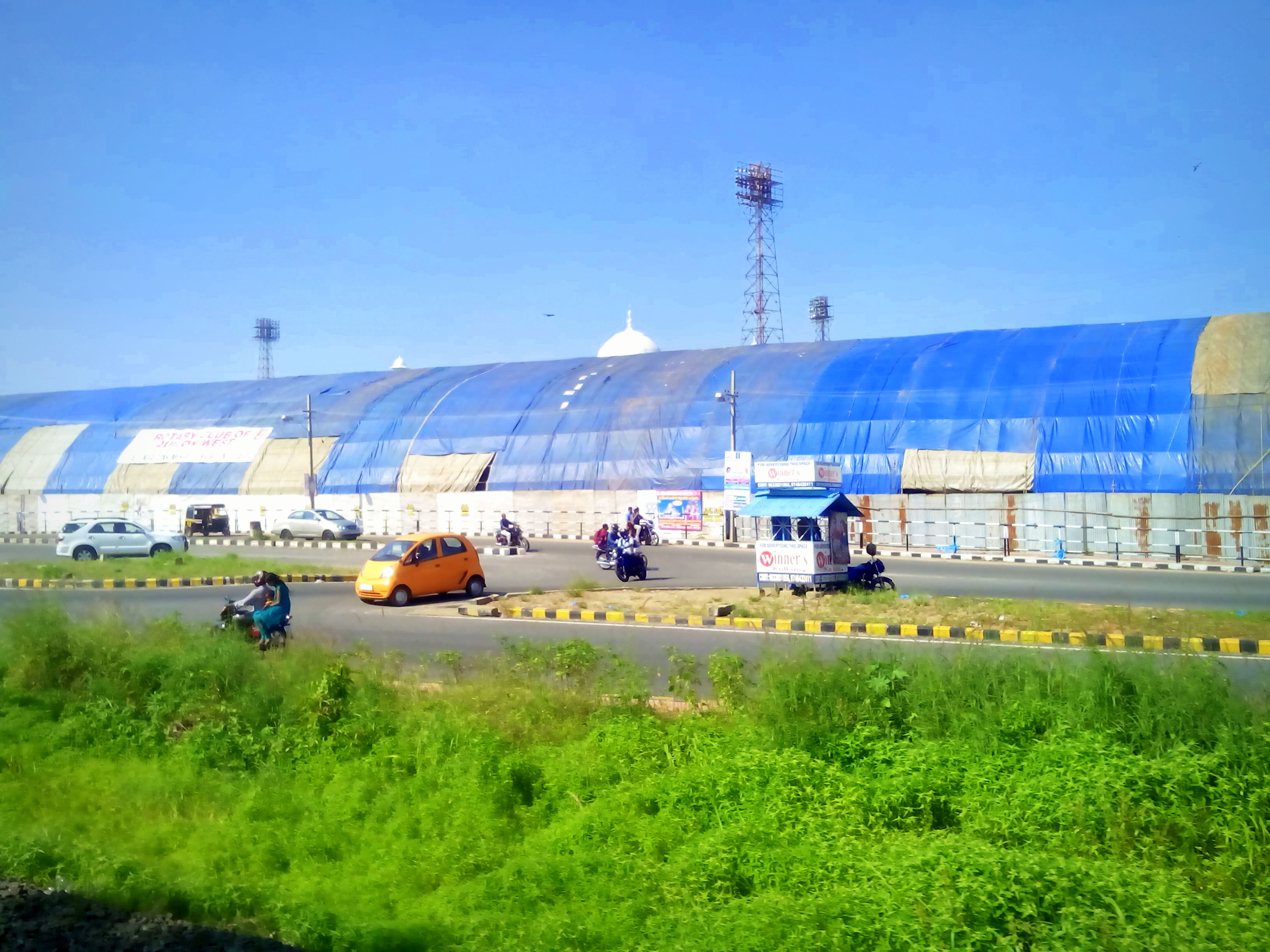
- An Exhibition going on at Cantonment Maidan
- Interactive map of Cantonment Maidan; Peeranki Maidan
- Location: Cantonment, Kollam, Kerala, India
- Coordinates: 8.881625°N 76.599752°E
- Founder: East India Company
- Operator: Kollam Municipal Corporation
- Open: All year

Cantonment Maidan or Peeranki Maidan or Peeringee Maidan is a historical ground in the eastern portion of Old Quilon town, near S.N College, in Kerala, India. It is closely associated with the social and political history of Kerala. It hosts the main exhibitions, party meetings and city's main cultural and sports events regularly. Vanitha Fest, Mango Fest, Kollam Bible Convention, Kerala Kaumudi Centenary Expo, various political party meets, Rallies, Cricket & Football Tournaments and other public functions are regularly taking place at Cantonment Maidan.

== History ==
Cantonment Maidan is situated at the east of old Quilon city. Two hundred years back, the maidan extended over a sizeable area of East Kollam. There were no railway connectivity in South Kerala then. Due to the importance of Kollam with public offices, Port and its trade importance, a British Garrison was stationed in Kollam - which was subsequently reduced to a native regiment, as a protective force for the then Maharaja of the erstwhile state of Travancore.

=== Battle of Quilon ===
In 1809, the local militia and the Army of Travancore stationed around Kollam attacked the British Garrison at the Cantonment Maidan on the heels of Velu Thampi Dalawa. The British force led by Col. Chalmers proved victorious in that six hours lasted war, that is known as Battle of Quilon. All the insurrectionist who participated in the war were court-martialled and got hanged at the maidan.

=== Other events held at Cantonment Maidan ===
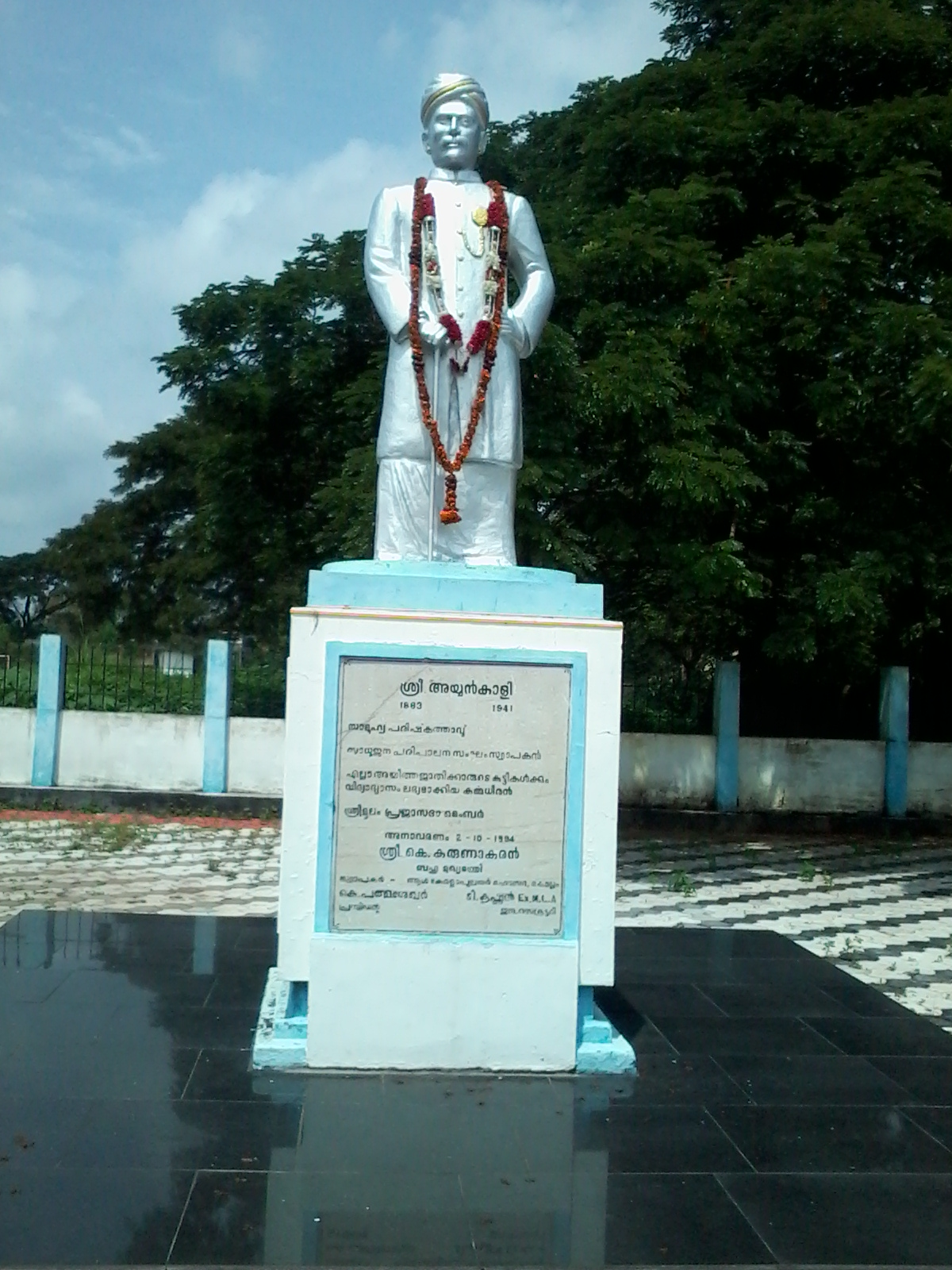
The statue of Ayyankali at Peeranki Maidan near SN College, Kollam

Apart from this, Cantonment Maidan has been the venue for many significant events. A compromise meeting was held here in 1915 as part of Pulayar-Nair Revolt at Perinad, also called the Kallumala Agitation, in which Ayyankali took part. A statue of Ayankali can be seen at the maidan. Mahatma Gandhi addressed the people here On 11 October 1927. Historic Chingam 17 Struggle happened at Cantonment Maidan on 2 September 1938 in which six people were killed in firing by the British police. The heroic traits of a group of locals who had challenged the British remain as a dusty chapter in the history of freedom struggle as there has not been effective attempts to record the story or spread it.

As per the 'History of Modern Kollam' penned by journalist late V. Lakshmanan, six persons were killed in police firing. The four identified among them were Asramam Lakshmanan, Ayathil Balakrishna Pillai, Kolloorvila Moideenkunju, and Kureepuzha Kochukunju. Thousands marched from Polayathode to Chinnakkada led by state congress leaders, including Kumbalathu Sankupillai and C Kesavan on the fateful day. Though there was a massive company of police force, the protesters could assemble at the Cantonment Maidan to hear the speeches of those designated by the state congress to give the civil disobedience speech, including M G Koshy, P G Varghese and K Sukumaran. Police arrested the speakers and opened fire at the gathering.

British Police used to exhibit five cannons at the adjacent park accounts for the name Peeringee Maidan, by which name this ground was earlier called. These cannons were used for firing at the patriots of the land is now kept at the Sardar Vallabhbhai Patel Police Museum in Kollam city. The present Armed Reserve Camp is situated at the old Cantonment ground, where the British Army and Sir CP's Army camped ahead of the firing.

== See also ==
- Kollam
- Asramam Maidan
- Polayathode
- Chinnakada
