= Sri Moolam Thirunal Palace =

Building in India

Sri Moolam Thirunal Palace SMP Palace
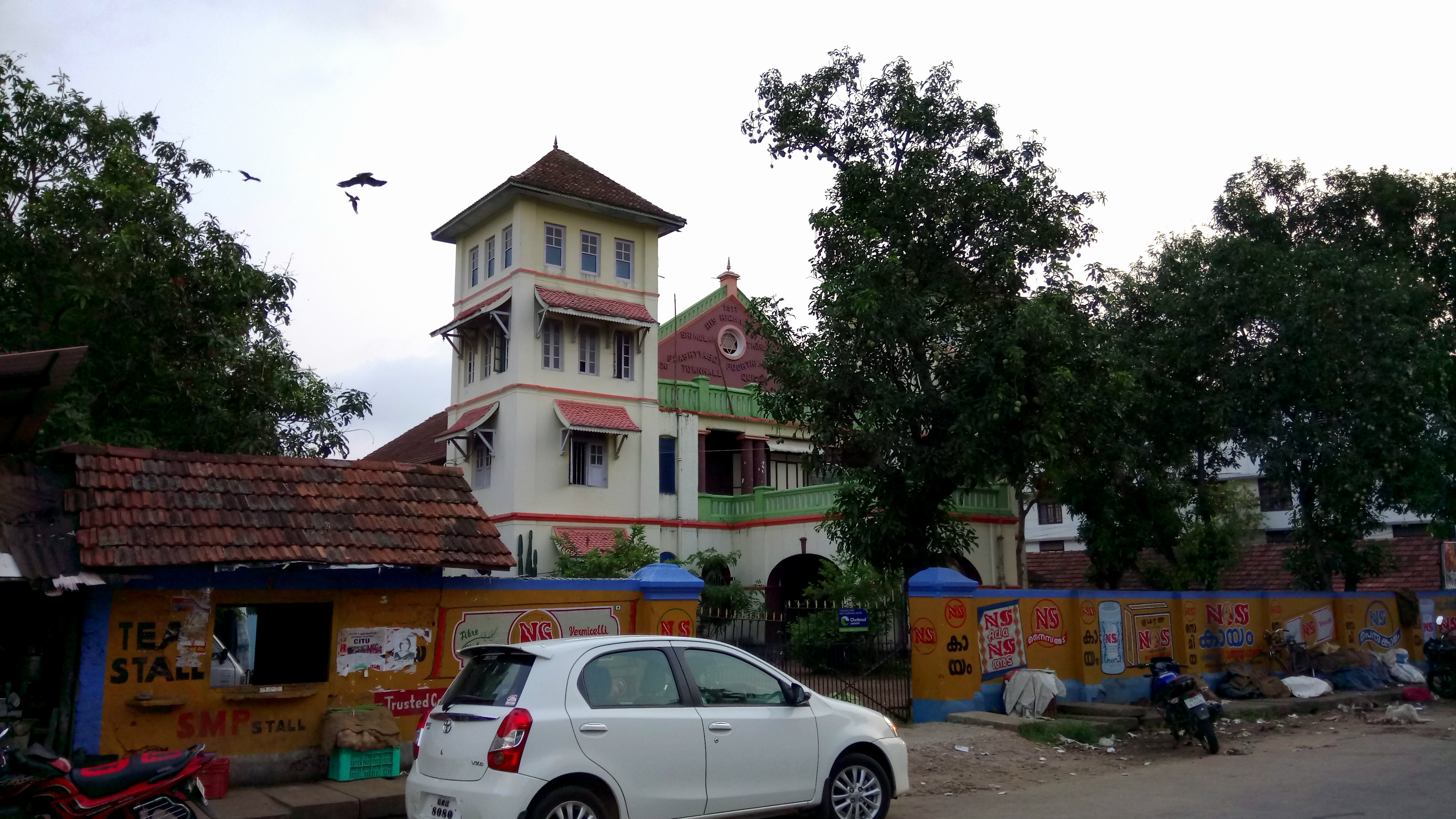
- Sri Moolam Thirunal Palace
- Interactive map of the Sri Moolam Thirunal Palace; SMP Palace area

General information
- Architectural style: Kerala style
- Location: Cantonment, Kollam city, India
- Coordinates: 8.883594°N 76.592508°E
- Completed: 1936
- Client: The Sri Moolam Shashtabda Poorthy Memorial Trust

Sri Moolam Thirunal Palace or SMP Palace or SMT Palace is a palace situated near the heart of the city of Kollam, in the state of Kerala, India. It was constructed in 1936 as a commemorate for the shashtabda poorthi (60th birthday) of the then ruler of erstwhile Travancore, Moolam Thirunal Rama Varma.

== History ==
Sri Moolam palace was constructed as a town hall to commemorate the shashtabda poorthi (60th birthday) of the then ruler of erstwhile Travancore, Moolam Thirunal Rama Varma. The people of Kollam accorded the Maharaja a reception as part of the shashtabda poorthi celebrations in 1917. Sri Moolam Shashtabda Poorthy Memorial Trust, a trust was formed to construct a town hall to commemorate the event. The then Government had donated 1.15 acres of land for the construction. But the construction of palace was completed only after the death of the King. Moolam Thirunal Rama Varma died in 1924. The town hall was completed in 1936. Later, the authorities have converted the palace as a movie theatre. SMP Palace is probably the oldest cinema theatre in Kollam.
