= Keshavadasa =

Keshavadasa (IAST Keśavadāsa, lit. "servant of Keshava (Vishnu)") is the name of various classical Sanskrit authors, and of a number of modern individuals

- Keshavdas (Keśavdās) (1555–1617), Sanskrit scholar and Hindi poet, writer of Rasikapriya
- Raja Kesavadas, 18th century officer in Travancore
