= Chempakaraman =

Keralite title of nobility

Chempakaraman or Chembakaramen was a title of honour bestowed by the Kingdom of Travancore to individuals for faithful service to the kingdom in public service.

== History ==
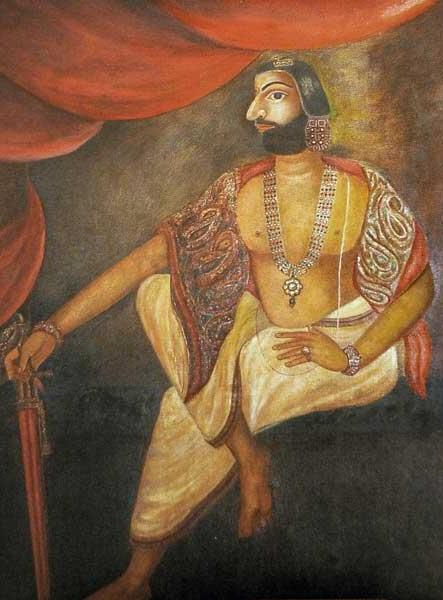
Marthanda Varma was the creator of the title Chempakaraman

It was during the reign of Marthanda Varma that an order akin to that of knighthood, was established as a kind of stimulus to those in the public service. Distinguished services were rewarded by this honor. It was denominated Chempakaraman.

== Conferring the title ==
The recipient of this distinguished honor when selected, is presented before the Maha Raja on a propitious day fixed for the ceremonial. The Maharaja then, delivering a short speech in the presence of all the officers of State, expressive of the satisfaction afforded by the knight, elect to justify king's bestowing such an exalted title on him, gives him some special presents and names him by the title Chempakaraman after his name. The knight then proceeds to the gate of the palace followed by the prime minister and other officials. At the gate, in a hall attached to it, takes place the subsequent ceremony which consists in the presentation of a new piece of a peculiar kind of silk, eight yards long, called Veeravaly Pattu and the wearing of a suit of new clothes. The knight being dressed properly, after the Travancore fashion, one end of the silk is tied round his head, leaving the other end to the extent of two and a half or three yards loose, like the train of a long robe. He is then placed on an elephant and behind him three nobles or other persons invested with similar titles, seats themselves bearing the train of the knight's turban. The knight then carried in procession, accompanied by a native band, a small detachment of military, together with all the State peons, kariakkar, and other servants. The procession moves round the four streets inside the fort, and returns to the gate, where the knight dismounts from the elephant and proceeds with the prime minister who is waiting for him to the latter's seat where the knight then enjoys the privilege of being seated with the minister. The new knight is then presented with a quantity of betel leaves and areca nuts, together with a few ripe limes in a silver plate, called thattom or thampalam, and thus ends the ceremony. From this day the title Chempakaraman Pillai is always added to his name.

== Notable Chembakaramans ==
- Velu Thampi Dalawa
