= Battle of Quilon =

1809 battle in India

- Part of Travancore-British War
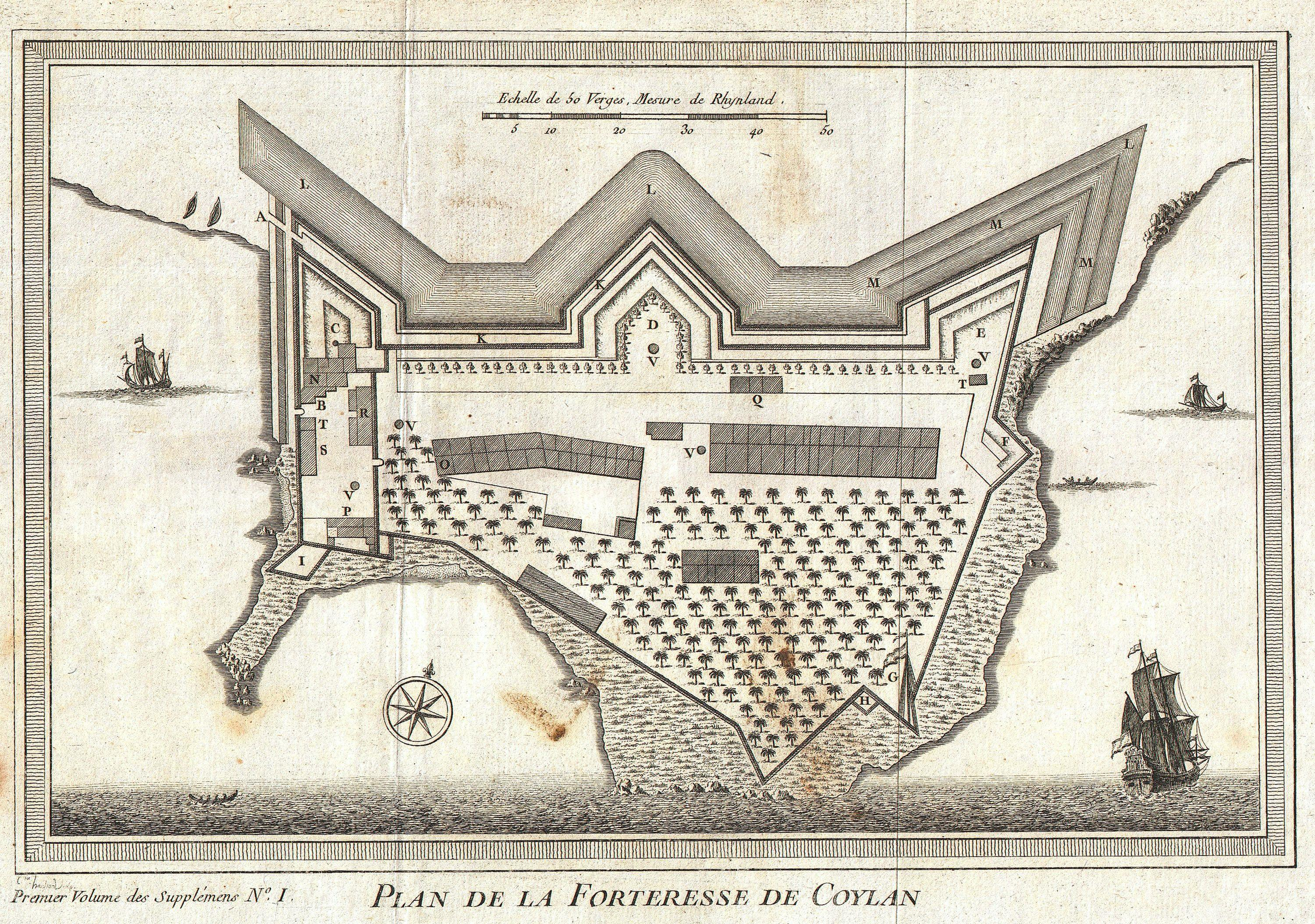
- Quilon Fort in 1756, after it had passed from Portuguese rule to the Dutch.
Date	15 January 1809
Location	Quilon (Kollam), India 8.88°N 76.60°E
Result	East India Company victory

Belligerents
British East India Company	Kingdom of Travancore

Commanders and leaders
Col. Chalmers	Velu Thampi Dalawa

Strength
	Total: 20,000–30,000: 18 Artillery pieces

Casualties and losses
141 Killed and Wounded	700 killed; 15 pieces of artillery captured
- Location within India

The Battle of Quilon (or Battle of Kollam) was fought on 15 January 1809 at Cantonment Maidan in Quilon, an important port city and business hub on the southwest coast of India. The conflict involved troops of the Indian kingdom of Travancore, led by the then Dewan (prime minister) of Travancore, Velu Thampi Dalawa, and a detachment of the British East India Company under Colonel Chalmers. The battle lasted for only six hours and is closely associated with the social and political history of Kerala.

== Background ==
The battle was the result of the British East India Company's occupation of the city of Quilon and an attack on their local garrison situated near Cantonment Maidan, a sizeable area in the east of old Quilon town. Due to the importance of Quilon for trade, administration and shipping, a British garrison was stationed in the town. This was subsequently reduced to a native regiment acting as a protective force for the then Maharaja of the erstwhile state of Travancore.

== The battle ==
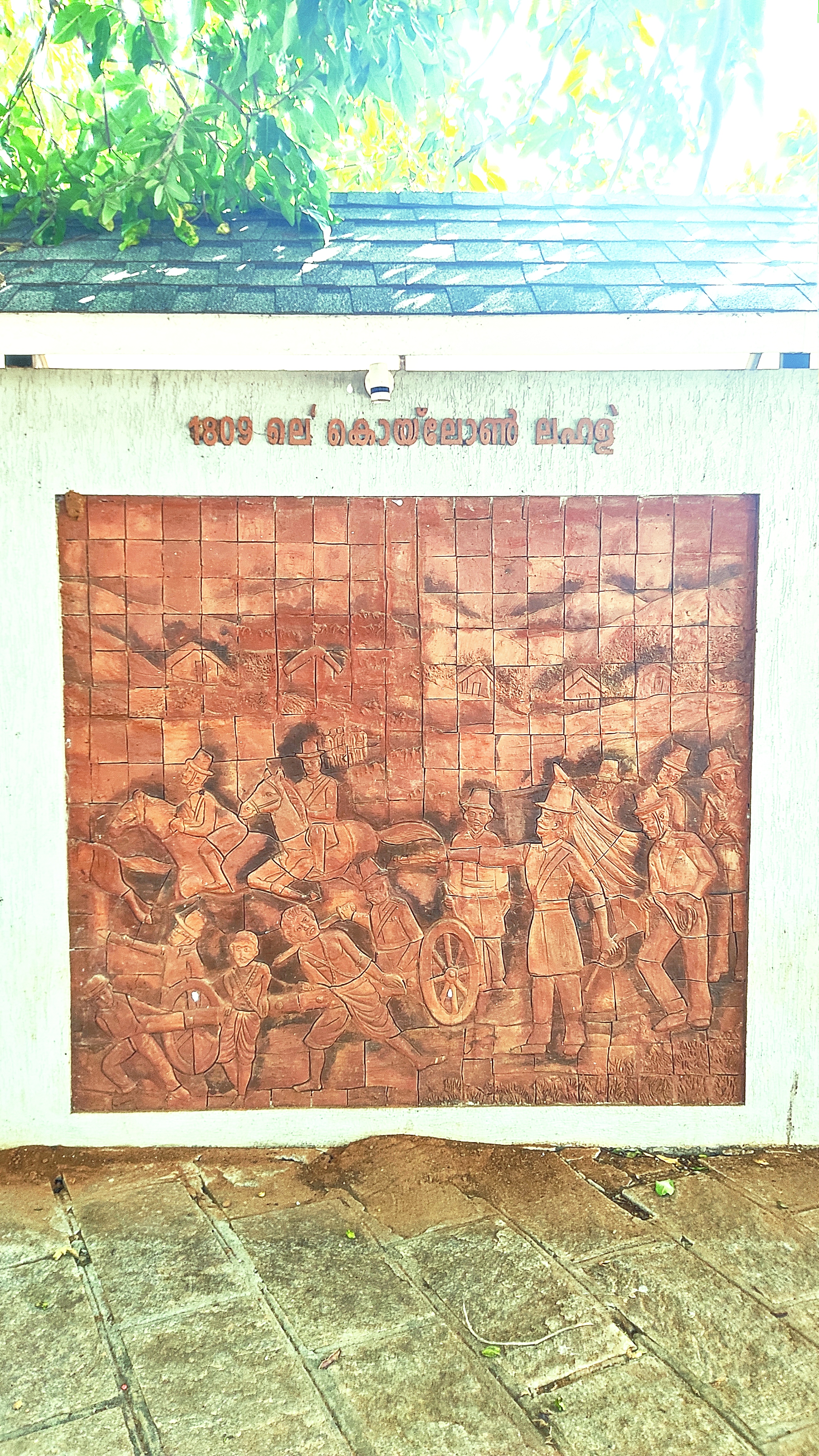
Relief in Ashramam, Kollam

On 15 January 1809, on the orders of Travancore Dewan Velu Thampi Dalawa, 20,000–30,000 Nair troops with 18 artillery pieces attacked the British. Their commander, Colonel Chambers, divided his force of one European regiment and three battalions of native sepoys into two columns, which then counter-attacked. The Nairs were driven off with the loss of 700 men and 15 artillery pieces. The battle lasted only six hours and resulted in all the insurrectionists who participated in the battle being court-martialled and subsequently hanged at the maidan.

== See also ==
- Quilon
- Cantonment Maidan
