= Mannadi =

- village
- Location in Kerala, India Mannadi (India)
- Coordinates: 9°5′17″N 76°44′22″E
- Country: India
- State: Kerala
- District: Pathanamthitta

Languages
  - Official: Malayalam, English
- Time zone: UTC+5:30 (IST)
- Vehicle registration: KL-26(Adoor sub RTO)
- Website: www.facebook.com/itsmannady

Mannadi is a village in Kadampanad grama panchayat at Adoor Taluk, Pathanamthitta District of Kerala, India.

== Location ==
Mannadi is 45 km (28 mi) from Kollam and 9 km (5.6 mi) from Adoor. It is equi-distance 4 km (2.5 mi) from Kadampanad and Enath. The nearest airport is Trivandrum International Airport, 80 km (50 mi) from Mannadi.

== History ==
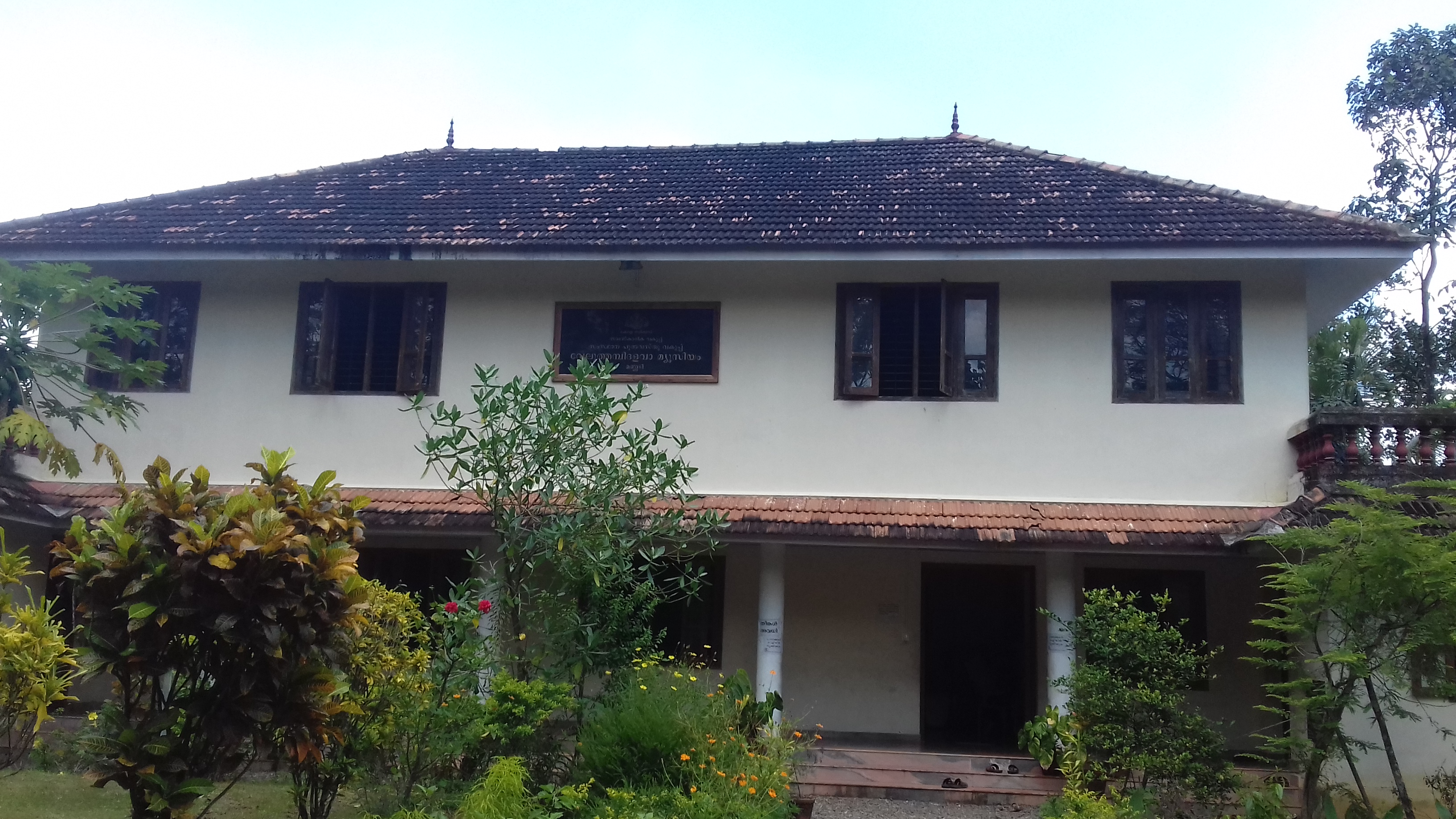
Velu Thampi Dalawa Museum, Mannadi

Velu Thampi Dalawa (Velayudhan Chempakaraman Thampi) (1765–1809) was the Dalawa or Prime Minister of the Indian kingdom of Travancore between 1802 and 1809 during the reign of His Highness Maharajah Bala Rama Varma Kulasekhara Perumal. He is best known for being one of the earliest individuals to rebel against the British East India Company's supremacy in India. He had committed suicide at Mannadi Temple, to avoid capture by the British. Thus Mannadi has taken its place in history. The Velu Thampi Dalawa Museum constructed in Mannadi, where the true legend committed suicide, reveals the true picture of the ancient Travancore culture. The ancient travancore culture, the coins and household equipments used then are showcased there.

== Places of interest ==
- Velu Thampi Dalawa Memorial and Museum
- Pazhaya Kavu Bhadrakali Temple
- Peruvar Koil Shiva Temple near Velu Thampi Smarakam
- Kambithan kal mandapam
- Puthiyakavu devi temple
- Aravakkalchani caves
- Mudippura devi temple
- Parakkadav
