= Pazhassi Raja Archaeological Museum =

Archaeological museum in Kozhikode, India

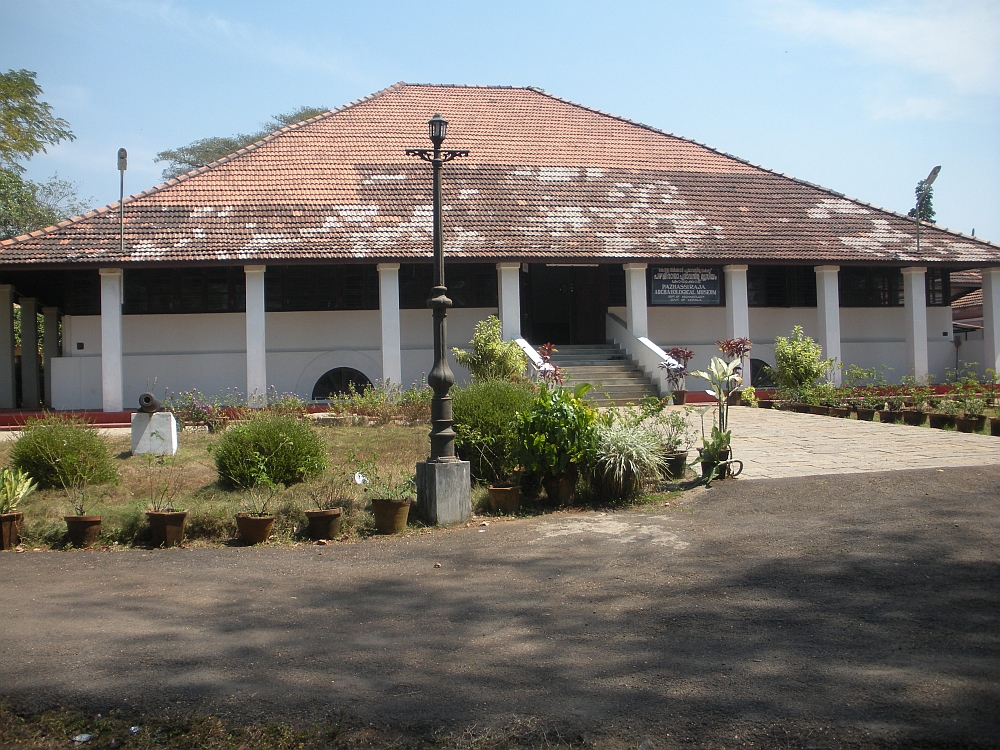
- Pazhassi Raja Archaeological Museum
- Established: 1976
- Location: East Hill, Kozhikode
- Coordinates: 11.2925°N 75.7781°E
- Type: Archaeological Museum.
- Collection size: Historical articfacts from 1000BC to 200AD
- Curator: Krishnaraj.k
- Owner: Kerala State Archaeological department.

Pazhassi Raja Archaeological Museum is a museum and art gallery in Kozhikode, Kerala, India. The museum has a rich collection of historical artifacts from 1000 BC to 200 AD.

== History ==
The building that houses the museum was constructed in 1812 and was then known as East Hill Bungalow. The bungalow was converted to an archaeological museum in 1976. In the year 1980, the building was renamed as the Pazhassi Raja Archaeological Museum. Pazhassi raja, known as the ' lion of kerala' led fierce resistance against the British east Indian company in the late 18th century. The museum was established to preserve and exhibit archaeological artifacts from different periods of Kerala history including Megalithic relics, ancient coins, murals, and sculptures.

== Collection ==
The museum has exhibits from the megalithic age and the Indus Valley civilization. The exhibits include ancient pottery, toys, stone and other metal sculptures. Coins, Models of temples, Burial urns and umbrella stones (tomb stones of rulers) are part of the museums's collection. The museum also has a collection of war weapons used by British soldiers and the official caps of British and French soldiers.

The special collections of the museum include the Panchaloha idols and stone statues described as ‘War heroes'.

== Governance ==
The museum is managed by the Kerala State Archaeology Department. The Kerala State government had spent Rs.76 lakh for the renovation of the building with further improvements planned.

== See also ==
- Kozhikode ,Easthill.
