= Raja Kesavadas =

State ruler of Travancore (1745–1799)

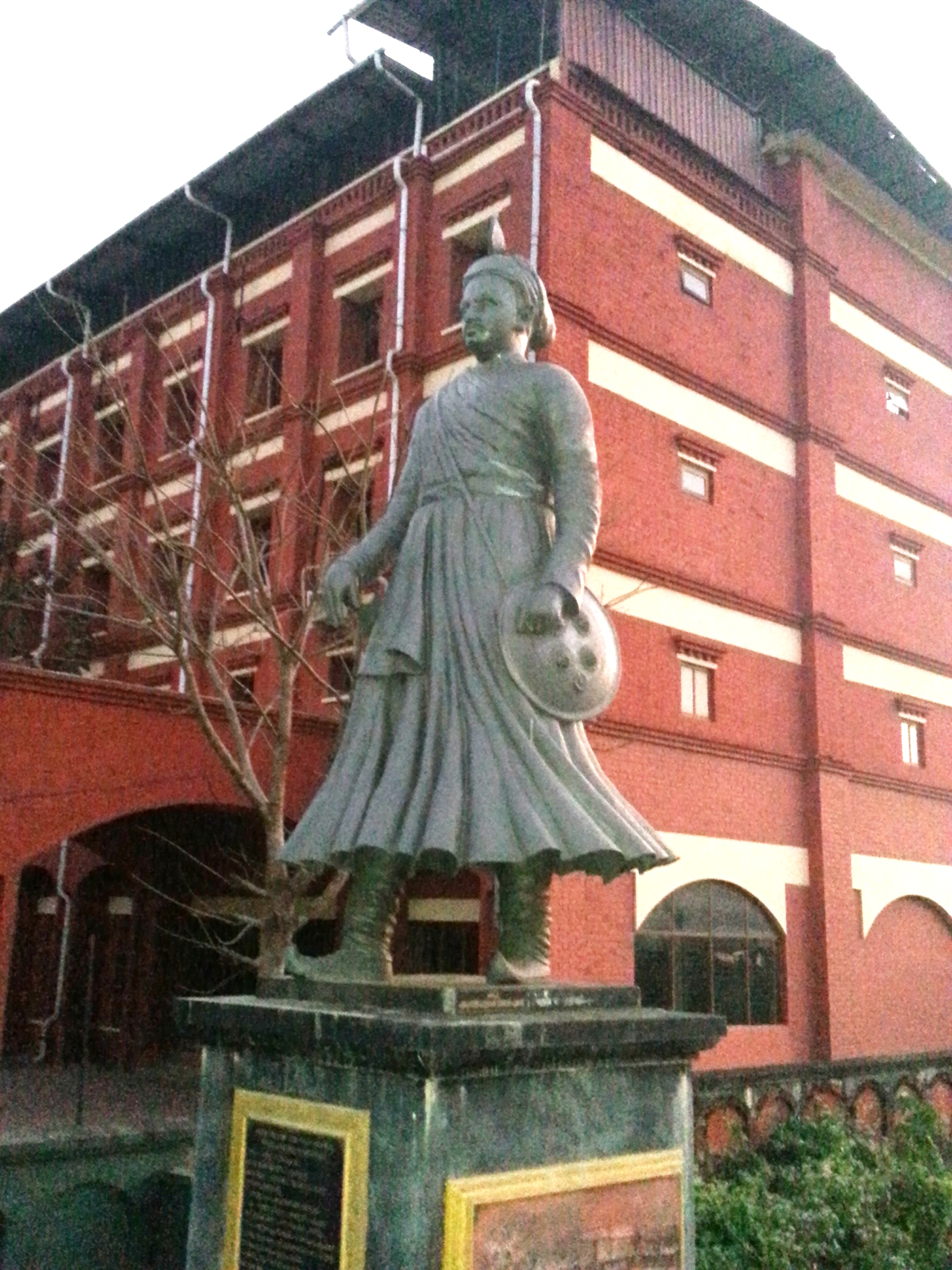
- Statue of Raja Kesavadas in Alleppey

Diwan of Kingdom of Travancore
- In office 1789–1798
- Monarch: Dharma Raja
- Preceded by: Krishnan Thampi
- Succeeded by: Jayanthan Sankaran Nampoothiri

Personal details
- Born: Kesavan Raman Pillai; 17 March 1745 Kunnathur, Travancore
- Died: 21 April 1799 (aged 54)
- Parent(s): Marthandan Thampi; Kaliamma Pillai

Raja Kesavadas born Kesavan Raman Pillai of Kunnathur, also known as (17 March 1745 – 21 April 1799; Sanskrit keśavadāsa) was the Dewan of Travancore during the reign of Dharma Raja Karthika Thirunal Rama Varma. He is well known for his military tactics and administrative acumen. He was the mastermind in developing the Alappuzha town.

== Early life ==
Rajah (/ˈrɑːdʒɑː/) Kesavadas was born Kesava Pillai of Kunnathur in a Nair family at a small hamlet called Kunnathur, Travancore (now in Kanyakumari district) on March 17, 1745 in the erstwhile Kingdom of Travancore. His full name was Keshav Raman Pillai. The name of his uncle Raman Pillai was added to his name according to matrilineal customs. His father Marthandan Thampi was a famed warrior in the Travancore army. Marthandan Thampi was also called the 'Great Master'. His mother's name was Kaliamma Pillai of Kunnathur House. After relinquishing the position of Commander-in-Chief of the palace, his father returned to Kashi after accepting asceticism and the entire burden of the family fell on Kesavapillai's head. Although he was not properly educated, Poovat Pokumusa Maraikkar, a local businessman, hired Keshav Pillai to look after the accounts in his shop. At a very young age, Keshav Pillai had a special talent. Through Kesava Pillai, the trade of Maraikar flourished. The woodcutter entrusted him with all the responsibilities of his shipping business. He used this opportunity to gain more economic knowledge and to learn Hindustani, Persian and Dutch.

== In Royal Service ==
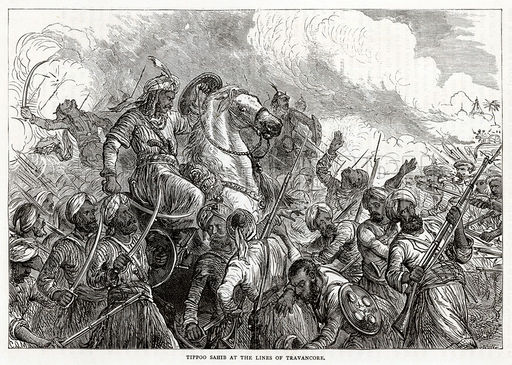
Tippu at the lines of Travancore by James Grant (c 1896)

The Maraikars, who were dependents of the then ruling Maharaja Karthika Thirunal (1758-1798: Travancore: 1758–1798), used to visit the king. At one point, Kesava Pillai captured the king's favor with his skills. Subsequently, the king gave him an extension in his palace. Keshava Pillai took full advantage of this golden opportunity. At about twenty-four years of age, Kesava Pillai was appointed as a rayasam (writer) in the palace under the Samprathi (the State Secretary). He became quite knowledgeable and influential that even the prime minister used to consult him. After the Battle of Kulachal, he came to terms with Marthanda Varma, who became the Commander-in-Chief of Travancore, became acquainted with officers such as Dutch Captain Delanoy, mastered war tactics and learned languages such as Portuguese and English. Impressed by Kesava Pillai's intelligence, patriotism and devotion to God, the Maharaja promoted him to the rank of Rayasam in 1765. Keshava Pillai played an important role in boosting trade by constantly corresponding with Dutch companies residing in places like Purakkad and Kulachal and English companies residing in Anchuthengu and others. He rose through the ranks Samprati (1768) and Sovereign (1788) and became Diwan of Travancore on 22 September 1789. He became the Diwan following the resignation of Diwan Chembakaraman Pillai due to old age disability. He did not relish the title of Dalawa. With the sanction of the Maharaja, he changed the old title of Dalawa to that of Dewan eschewing the old designation of Dalawa, as better suited to the times. He was thus the first Dewan of Travancore

When Tippu Sultan of Mysore attacked Travancore, Kesava Pillai was the commandant of the state army. Travancore army fought against the Mysore force under the leadership of Kesava Pillai. Later when Mysore was attacked Tipu Sultan had to retreat to Srirangapatnam.

Recognizing his victory over the Mysore, the Karthika Thirunal Maharaja of Travancore appointed Kesava Pillai as Diwan of Travancore. He was glorified by the British Governor Mornington, by the title Raja in appreciation of his administrative talents. As Diwan, Raja Kesavadas was responsible for shifting the capital of Travancore from Padmanabhapuram to Thiruvananthapuram.

== Military training ==
Kesava Pillai received military training under General Eustachius De Lannoy. This training perfected him to take active service as an efficient general. He was well trained in the military art and was competent to command a whole brigade in times of emergency. He learned the Dutch and Portuguese languages under General D’Lanoy and the Persian and Hindustani under the Pattan officers.

== Reforms ==
Kesava Das's foremost objective was to develop the economy of Travancore. He developed the economic condition of the people by improving trade. The profits from the trade helped the State to maintain a standing army. It also helped to make other necessary preparations for the struggle with Tippu Sultan. Essentially it was a kind of war finance system. He visited coastal areas from Kanyakumari to Alappuzha and converted two areas such as Alappuzha and Vizhinjam which had the potential to be upcoming ports.

Military reforms

Of his military reforms, the most noteworthy is the repair of the old forts and the construction of many new roads. Guns and shorts were speedily manufactured in the arsenal at Udayagiri.

Development of Alappuzha port

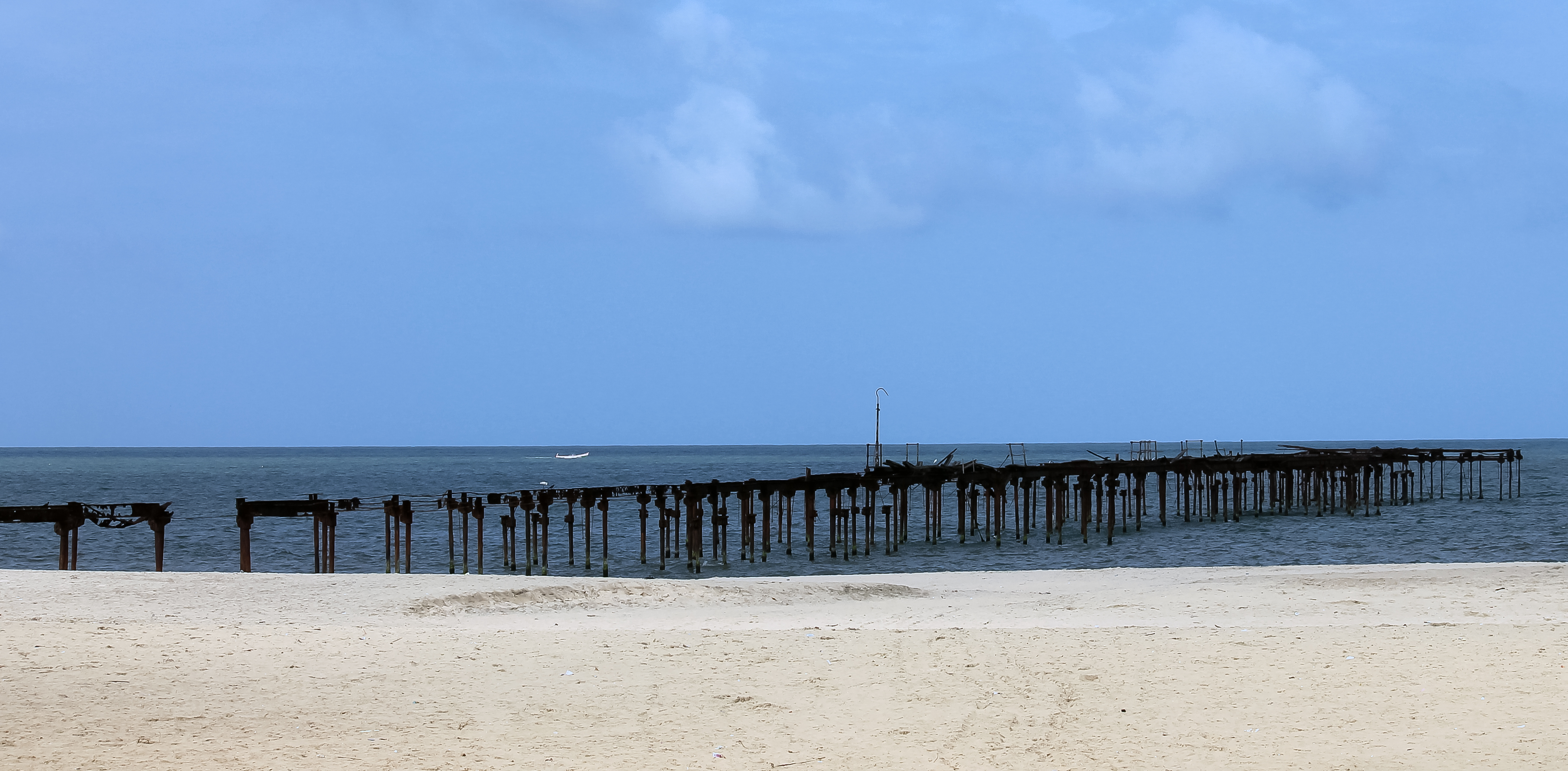
Remnants of the pier bridge which was built to facilitate the transportation of goods to the ships

His all-time contribution is finding an ideal location and constructing a well-planned port city at Alappuzha. He found Alappuzha as the most suitable, because of geographical and oceanic reasons. He constructed two parallel canals for bringing goods to port and offered infrastructural facilities to merchants and traders from Surat, Mumbai and Kutch to start industrial enterprises, trading, and cargo centres. Alappuzha attained progress and became the financial nerve centre of Travancore during his time. Traders from Bombay, Saurashtra and Surat were attracted to Alleppey. An effort was made to divert the trade of Cochin to Allepey port.

The port was opened in 1762, mainly for the export of coir-matting and coir-yarn. Kesavadas built three ships for trade with Calcutta and Bombay, and Alleppey afforded a convenient depot for the storage and disposal of goods produce in the east.

Vizhinjam port

Vizhinjam was developed into a small port by Raja Kesava Das.

Construction of MC road

The Main Central Road (MC Road) which is the arterial State Highway in the Travancore region of Kerala state was constructed at the time when Raja Kesavadas was the Dewan of Travancore.

Opening of Chalai Market

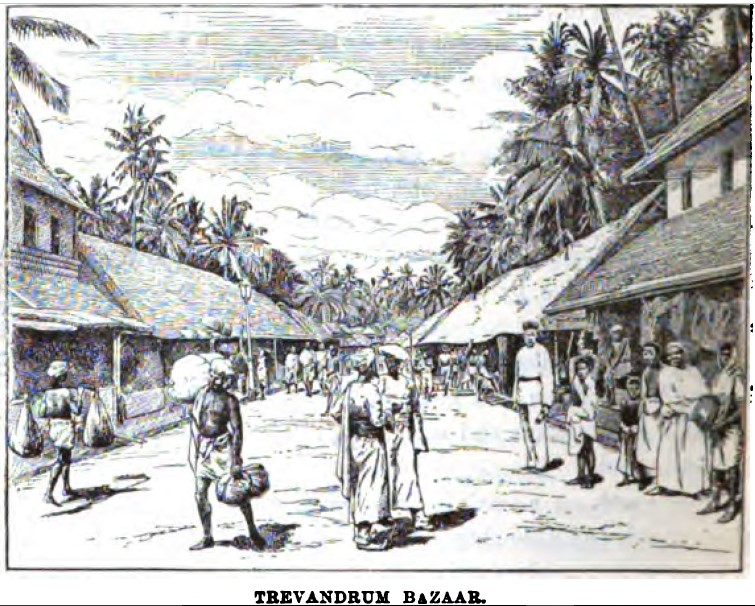
Trevandrum Bazaar (p.102, 1891), London Missionary Society

Chalai Market was officially established towards end of 18th century by Raja Kesavadas with an intention to make this bazaar a central point for the supply of commodities to the Travancore kingdom. Killi and the Karamana rivers nearby were used to carry goods from different parts of Travancore state. Both of the rivers were bridged. In 1786, Karthika Thirunal Rama Varma shifted to Thiruvananthapuram from Padmanabhapuram in Tamil Nadu. This helped Chalai to flourish.

Nedumkotta

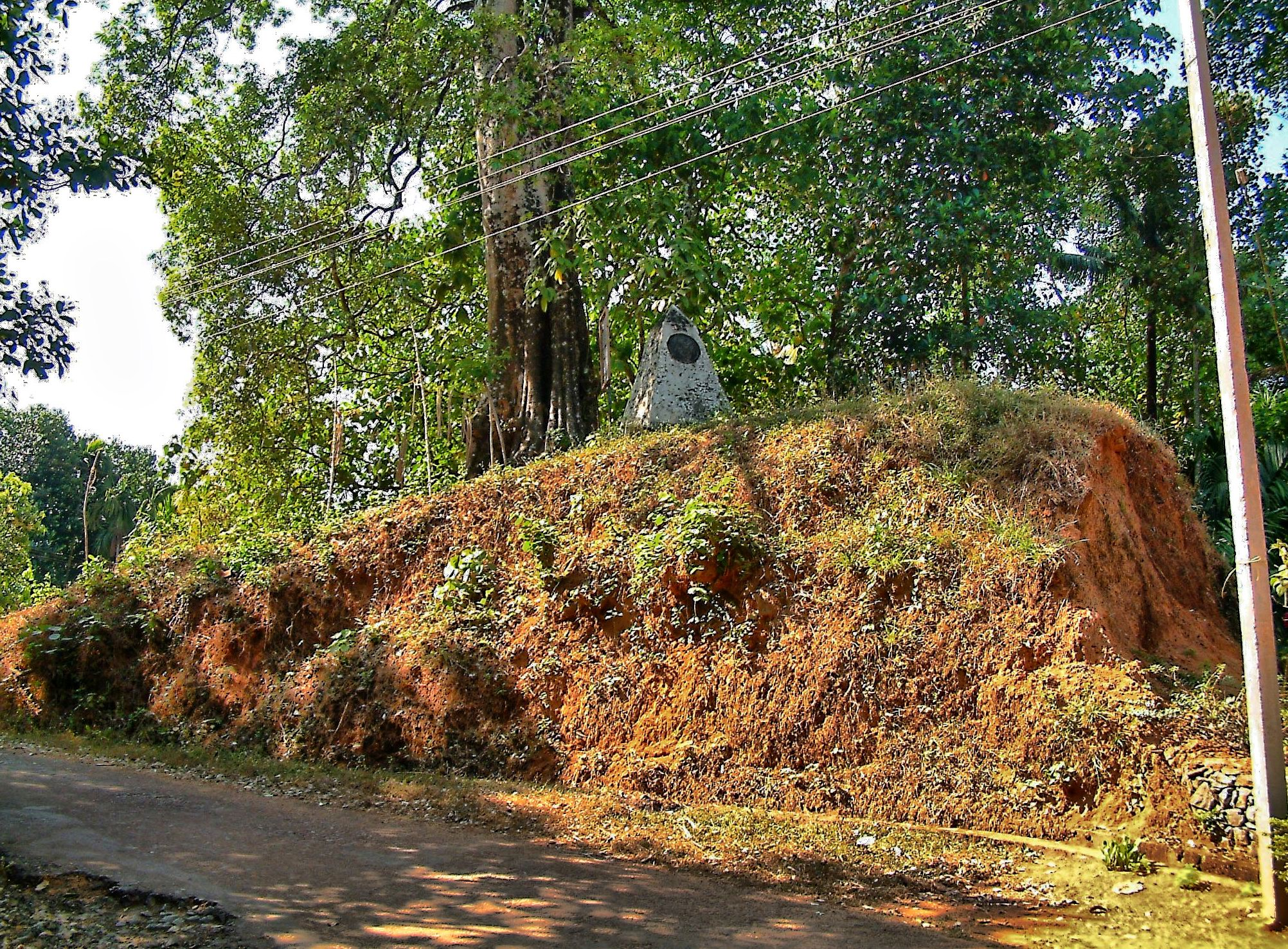
The relics of the entrance of travancore lines

The greatest achievement of Kesavadas was his defence of Travancore against Tippu Sultan. When Kesavadas came to power, Tipu was threatening at the gates of Travancore. He bought the Kranganur and Ayakotta forts from the Dutch. He repaired the fort at other places and strengthened the army with well-trained soldiers; In negotiations with the English at Madras, he secured two of the company's troops and stationed them at the fort. He succeeded in the fight against Tipu and expelled him from the borders of Travancore and even his retreat did not give him peace of mind. He followed Tipu until the soldiers travelled a long distance and took heavy lives.

Agricultural and Industrial Reforms

Raja Kesava Das took steps to develop Agriculture and related industries. Irrigation was prepared and fresh lands were brought. agriculturists were helped financially with loans and remission of taxes. Thiruvananthapuram city was modernized and beautified. Roads were widened and the fort was repaired.

Revenue reforms

Gold coins such as Anantharayen fanam, Chinna fanam and Ananthavarahen were coined in the Travancore mint. A new contribution called Nilavary, upon Sircar pattam lands was raised which yielded a good round sum of money. For proper administration of the State, the Chattavariola (collection of rules and laws) were framed. Dewan succeeded in clearing away the greater part of the State-debt incurred in consequence of many wars and other emergencies.

== Later years ==
His tenure of Diwanship ended with the demise of Dharma Raja Karthika Thirunal in 1798. Balarama Varma, his successor aged sixteen became the crown prince who was too young in the hands of Jayanthan Sankaran Nampoothiri. Raja Kesavadas was proclaimed as a traitor and kept under house arrest which helped Jayanthan Sankaran Nampoothiri to usurp the post of Diwan. Later his family assets were confiscated and were poisoned to death on 21 April 1799.

== Memorials ==
- A swimming pool in Alappuzha was built in 1997 in Raja Kesavadas's name.
- Raja Kesavadas N. S. S. Higher Secondary School in Sasthamangalam Thiruvananthapuram.
- His statue has been erected in Allepey- Changanassery road.
- Memorial Park in Allepey.
- A town at the start of M. C. Road is named Kesavadasapuram after him.
