= Kollam Cantonment =

- Neighbourhood
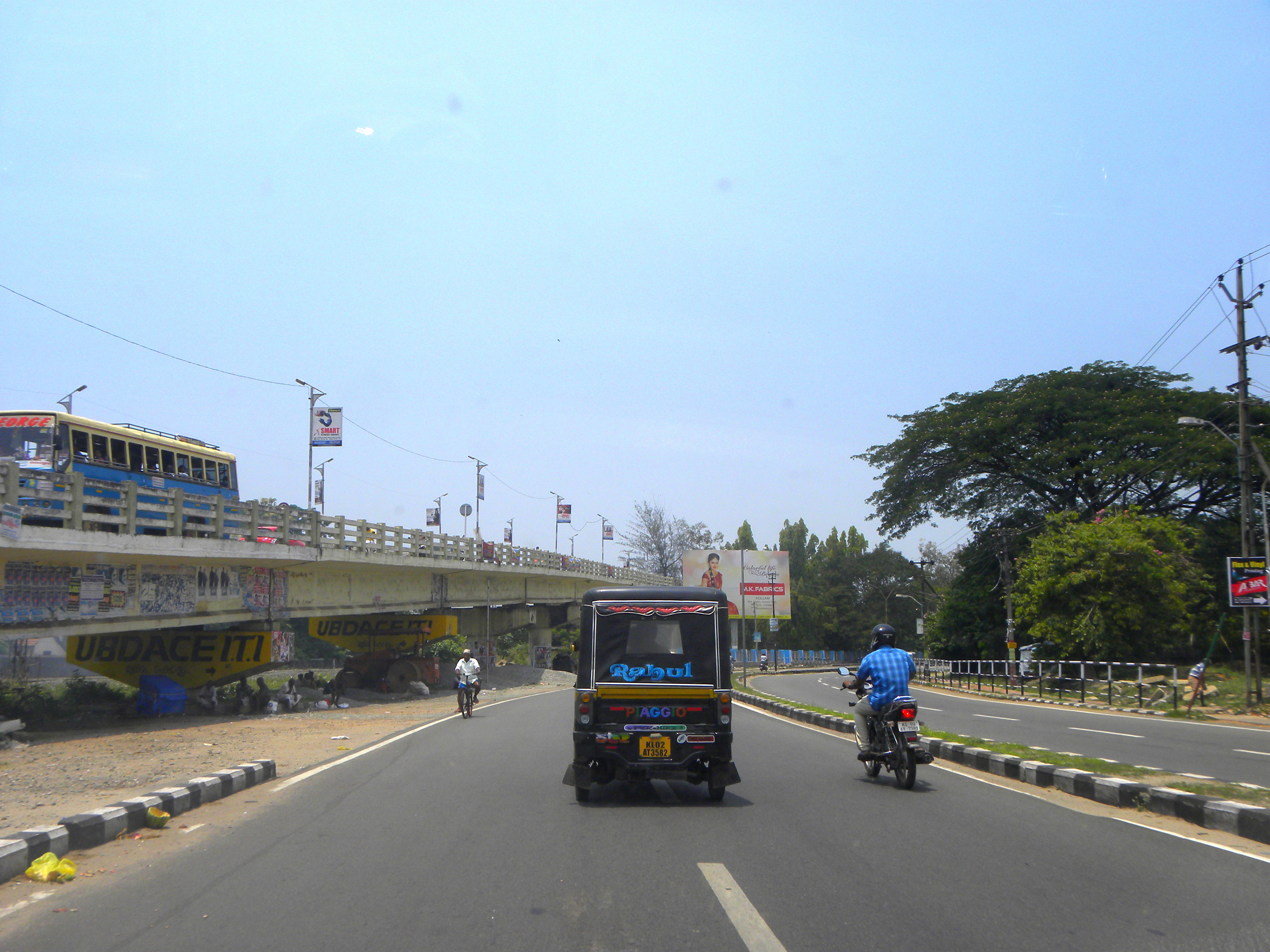
- Model road and Railway overbridge in Kollam Cantonment

- Location in Kollam, India Kollam Cantonment (Kerala) Kollam Cantonment (India)
- Coordinates: 8.881160°N 76.599078°E
- Country: India
- State: Kerala
- City: Kollam
- Time zone: UTC+5.30 (IST)
- Postal code: 691001
- Area code: 0474
- Lok Sabha constituency: Kollam
- Civic agency: Kollam Municipal Corporation
- Avg. summer temperature: 34 °C (93 °F)
- Avg. winter temperature: 22 °C (72 °F)
- Website: http://www.kollam.nic.in

Kollam Cantonment (originally Quilon Cantonment) is a residential neighbourhood in the city of Kollam. It arose as a cantonment of the British Raj in the 17th century. It is now a thickly populated area of the city of Kollam. Some of the important business centres, shopping complexes and Government offices are located here. Kollam Junction railway station is also located in the cantonment ward of corporation.

== History ==
Kollam(Quilon) was one of the trade hubs in British India. Kollam Port had trades history with Phoenicians, Arabs and Chinese etc. The city was conquered by Portuguese, Dutch and British people during 16th to 18th centuries. Considering the importance, a British garrison was stationed in Kollam which was subsequently reduced to a native regiment, as a protective force for the then Maharaja of the erstwhile state of Travancore. The garrison was situated at the Cantonment Maidan during those days.

== Public/Private institutions situated at Kollam Cantonment area ==
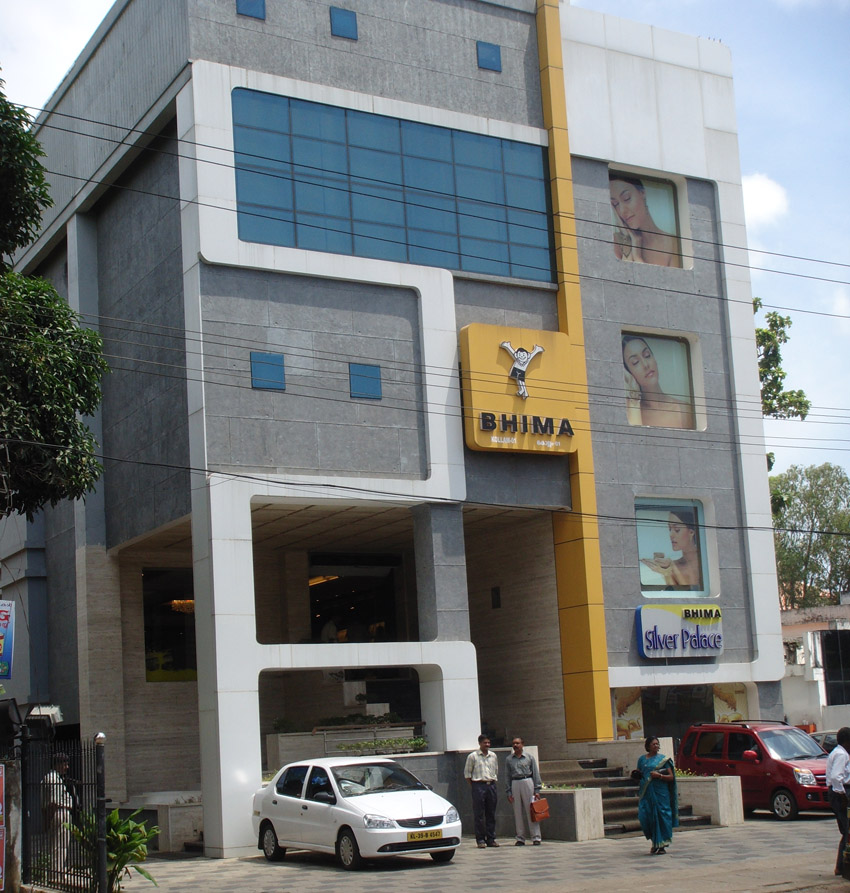
Bhima Jewellers situated at Kollam Cantonment area

The Kollam Corporation Town Hall, named the C. Kesavan Memorial Municipal Town Hall in the memory of C. Kesavan – a freedom fighter and former Chief Minister of erstwhile Travancore-Cochin state – is a decades-old building situated on the National Highway passing through the Cantonment. The building is now one of the main venues for several cultural events and meetings. Apart from the town hall, there are other buildings of note in the Cantonment area.

- Corporation office, Kollam
- Kollam Junction railway station
- Kollam Armed Reserve Police Force Camp (ARPF Camp)
- Kollam Public Library
- Sopanam Auditorium
- Sri Moolam Thirunal Palace(SMP Palace)
- Lal Bahadur Shastri Stadium
- Cantonment Maidan
- Kollam Passport Seva Kendra
- Bhima Jewellers
- Quilon Athletic Club(QAC)
- Kerala Water Authority Office
- Al-Manama Supermarket
