= Velu Thampi Dalawa =

Diwan of Travancore

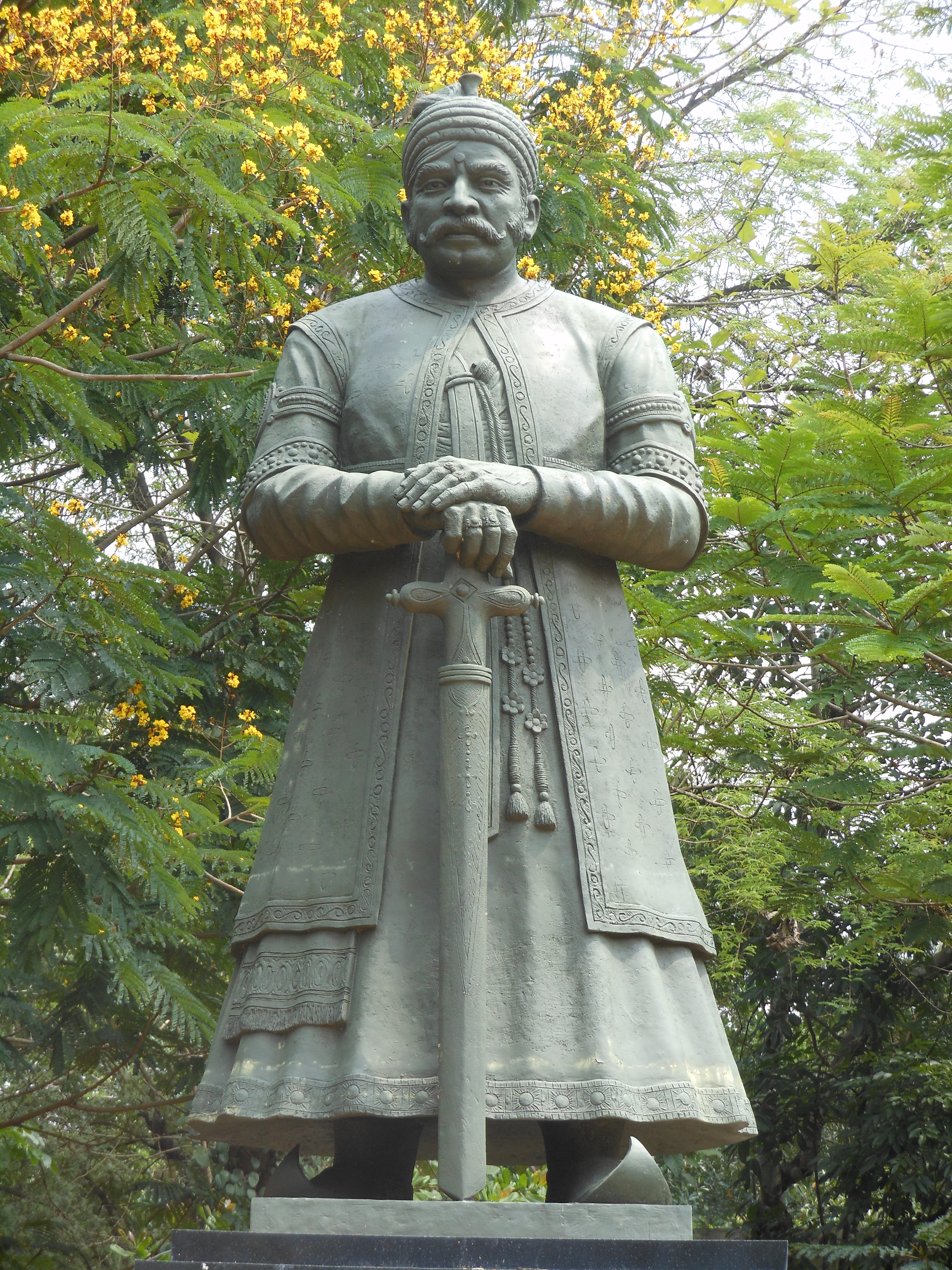
- Statue of Veluthampi Dalawa at Mannadi in Adoor

Diwan of Kingdom of Travancore
- In office 1802–1809
- Preceded by: Jayanthan Sankaran Nampoothiri
- Succeeded by: Ummini Thampi
- Monarch: Balarama Varma

Personal details
- Born: 6 May 1765 Thalakulam, Travancore
- Died: 1809 (aged 43–44) Mannadi, Travancore
- Parent(s): Manakkara Kunju Mayatti Pillai; Valiyamma Pillai Thankachi

Velayudhan Chempakaraman Thampi of Thalakulam (1765–1809) was the Dalawa or Prime Minister of the Indian kingdom of Travancore between 1802 and 1809 during the reign of Bala Rama Varma Kulasekhara Perumal. He is best known for being one of the earliest individuals to rebel against the British East India Company's authority in India.

== Early life ==
Velayudhan Thampi was born in a Nair family to Manakkara Kunju Mayatti Pillai and his wife Valiyamma Pillai Thankachi of Thalakkulam. He was born on 6 May 1765 in the village of Thalakkulam in Travancore which is in the southern district of Travancore State, Kerala (present day Kanyakumari district, Tamilnadu). His full title was "Valiya Veettil Thampi Chempakaraman Velayudhan" being from the family that held the ownership of the province and the high title of Chempakaraman for their services to the modern state created by Maharajah Marthanda Varma. He was the grandson of Ettmar Varma Thampuran of Thattari Kovilakam, Parappanadu Swarupam. Velu Thampi, was appointed a Kariakkar or Tahsildar at Mavelikkara during the initial years of the reign of Maharajah Dharmaraja Ramavarma.

== Rise to Dalawaship ==
Bala Rama Varma was one of Travancore's least popular sovereigns whose reign was marked by unrest and various internal and external political problems. He became Rajah at the age of sixteen and fell under the influence of the corrupt nobleman Jayanthan Sankaran Nampoothiri from the Zamorin of Calicut's kingdom. One of the first atrocities during his reign was the deposition, arrest and subsequent poisoning of the much loved Raja Kesavadas, the then Dewan of Travancore. In 1799 (974 ME), Thottapaayi Naboothiri of Kingdom of Cochin prevailed on his friend Jayanthan Sankaran Nampoothiri to secretly and freely return Karappuram, which had been conquered by HRH Marthanda Varma, back to Kingdom of Cochin. The proceedings were halted by Raja Kesavadas, which was one of the reasons why Jayanthan Sankaran Nampoothiri decided to have him murdered; subsequently, the Maharjah deposed Raja Kesavadas, and had him put under house arrest where he was found dead in his house. In 1800, after assuming office, the British resident, Col. Macaulay publicly accused the Nampoothiri of this murder and had him brought before a court of enquiry conducted by Travancore- but the Colonel found that "more no solicitude was shown to avoid rather than effect discovery". Sankaran Nampoothiri was subsequently appointed Dewan/Dalawa (Prime Minister) and was assisted by two other ministers - Thuckalay Shankaranarayanan Chetty and Matthoo Tharakan. The first act of the ministry was to confiscate all assets of the former, murdered Dalawa, right up to the last ornament worn by his partner. Subsequently, the state treasury, which had been full during the tenure of the former Dalawa was soon empty due to corruption, so the ministers decided to collect money by ordering the tahsildars (district officers) to pay large amounts of money. The amounts of money to be paid were determined without any reference to the revenue of the districts. Corporal punishment was inflicted on the nobles who were unwilling/unable to pay the money.

Velu Thampi, the Tahasildar(Karyakar) of a southern district, was ordered to pay 20,000 Panams (equivalent to Rs. 3000) to which he responded that he needed three days to pay. Velu Thampi then returned to his district, gathered the people of Nanjanad and an uprising ensued. The ministry sent orders for his arrest, which had the opposite effect as people from all parts of Travancore armed themselves and united to surround the palace and demand the immediate dismissal and banishment of Jayanthan Sankaran Nampoothiri. They also demanded that his two ministers (Matthoo Tharakan, Sankaranarayanan Chetty) be brought to a public place then undergo flogging and have their ears cut off and that odious taxes such as the salt tax would be abolished. The punishments were duly carried out on 6th of Mithunam 974 ME with Tharakan jailed at Trivandrum and Sankaranarayan at Udayagiri Fort. A local nobleman, Aiyyappan Chempakaraman Pillai of Chirayinkeezhu was appointed as the Dalawa (Prime Minister) and Velu Thampi was appointed the commerce minister. The former was an able administrator but passed away in 1801 (976 ME) and another nobleman, Padmanabhan Chempakaraman Pillai of Parassala was appointed Dalawa. Padmanabhan Chempakaraman Pillai was weak and corrupt and was dismissed after a mere 8 months in power. Courtiers of the Maharajah such as Samprathi Kunjilam Pillai, Valiya Meleluthu Muthu Pillai and Stanapathi Subba Iyyer, all put forward Velu Thampi's name for the post of the Dalawa. In addition, two other nobles, the brother and the nephew of the murdered Raja Kesavadas, Chempakaraman Kumaran Thambi and Erayimman, too applied for the post of the Dalawa. Allegedly forged documents, putting the latter two in a bad light, were presented to the Raja by Samprathi Kunjilam Pillai which resulted in the execution of Chempakaraman Kumaran Thambi and Erayimman and their friends, by the Raja's palace guards. In 1801, Velu Thampi was appointed the Dalawa of Travancore with the blessings of the British resident, Colin Macaulay.

== Career as Dalawa ==
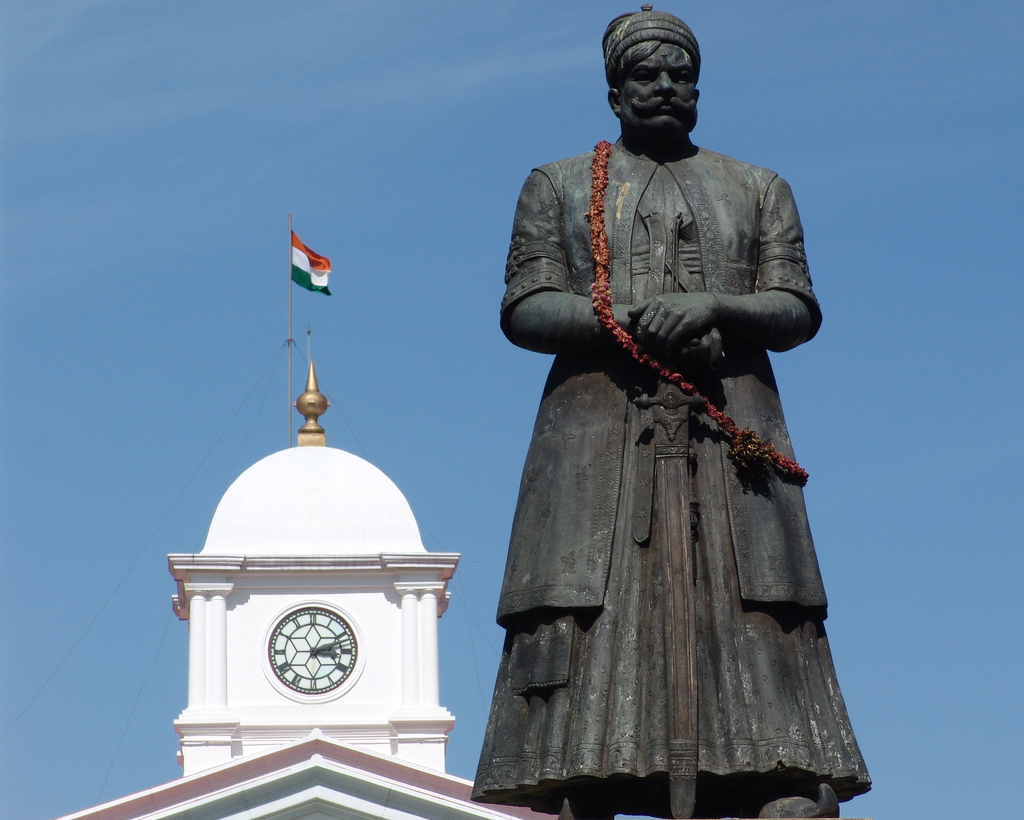
Sculpture of Velu Thampi Dalawa in the Secretariat campus, Thiruvananthapuram

The Madras Government sanctioned Thampi's appointment within a few months. Within three years of the death of Raja Kesavadas the country was plagued with corruption and various problems caused by the banished Namboodiri Dalawa and the treasury was empty.

Velu Thampi resorted to drastic measures to improve the situation. Velu Thampi was very strict regarding enforcing justice and depended on dread to enforce his rule. He would tour different areas of the kingdom and enforce justice using strict methods. Justice was enforced on the very day of the trials and those found guilty were hanged on the branches of very tree under which the trial had taken place. In the words of V. Nagam Aiya, "Strict honesty was thus barbarously enforced. The race of thieves became extinct." Burglary and robbery was totally eradicated and the public, regardless of gender, could use the roads at any time of the day or night without fear. Flogging, cutting off of ears and noses as well as nailing people to trees were some of the punishments adopted during his term as Dalawa. Stealing and lock picking resulted in amputations, attacks on women were punished with beheading. At times, Thampi would carry out collective punishment to attain justice - an example is quoted by V. Nagam Aiya where the Dalawa, who had completed his duties for the day, had set aside his personal time and rushed all the way from Thiruvananthapuram on receiving the complaint from a Namboothiri who had been robbed at Edava. The Dalawa had three random Marakkar of the village executed by nailing them to very the tree under which he had carried out the court of enquiry and this resulted in the rest of the village returning the missing gold which had been robbed by a few individuals of the village. Velu Thampi was totally impartial when it came to punishing corruption - A high ranking civil servant, P. Shankunni Menon, cites an incident when a relative of Thampi had his hand amputated for trying to illegally take possession of the land of a less influential member of the society belonging to the Nadar (caste) by forging the title deeds- despite the kinship or the entreaties of his own mother to spare his high ranking relative, Velu Thampi had the sentence carried out and had the land restored to the original owner. The harsh measures produced results and justice and order were restored within a year of Velu Thampi's accession to the Dalawaship.

Velu Thampi was an able administrator. He carried out surveys of land, issued new title deeds (pattayam) to land owners. This led to increase in revenue from taxes. He was able to pay off the arrears in salaries to all government staff and improved the financial position of the state. He improved towns such as Kollam and Alappuzha, built markets, roads and palaces and gave all support to the commercial development. His abilities were noted even by the Governor General Richard Wellesley, 1st Marquess Wellesley who had presented him with valuable shawls, gold clothing and kincob in accordance to the formality accorded to rajas in British India.

Nevertheless, despite his attempts to enforce justice, his personal courage, administrative skills and intelligence, Velu Thampi was not an able statesman as Dalawas Ramayyan Dalawa or Raja Kesavadas had been; both of whom had displayed ample amounts of prudence, probity, calmness and tact. Instead, Velu Thampi was of a rebellious, abrasive, impetuous nature and lacked key diplomatic and management skills.

== Initial intrigues against the Dalawa ==
The Dalawa's undue severity and overbearing conduct resulted in resentment amongst the Nair nobility, the very same people who had catapulted his rise to power. A conspiracy was formed against him under the influence of Samprathi Kunjunilam Pillai, a powerful Travancore cabinet official - the same courtier who had engineered Thampi's rise to power- who succeeded in getting the Maharajah to sign a royal warrant to arrest and immediately execute Velu Thampi Dalawa. The Dalawa, who had been working at Allepey when he received news of the conspiracy, immediately rushed to Cochin to meet the British Resident, Col. Colin Macaulay, who, by that time, had become a good friend. Col. Macaulay had already received evidence that Kunjunilam Pillai had a major hand in the trumped up charges and executions of the two relatives of Raja Kesavadas along with their loyal supporters. Col. Macaulay advised his friend Dalawa Thampi to seek out the Maharajah and plead his case. However, on the orders of the Samprathi, the Travancore soldiers did not allow Dalawa Thampi access to the court, and instead, tried to assassinate him. Therefore Col. Macaulay armed Dalawa Velu Thampi with a small force of British soldiers from Quilon and sent him to Trivandrum with evidence of Kunjunilam Pillai's conspiracy. Pillai was found guilty of murder and conspiracy and punished accordingly. Courtiers such as Valia Meleluthu Muthu Pillai, Padmanabha Chempakaramen Pillai, Kochunarayana Pillai, Vanchiyor Padmanabhan Pillay and Sarvadhi Neelkantan Chempakaraman Pillai were all arrested and incarcerated at Udayagiri Fort where, with the exception of three courtiers, the rest passed away under mysterious circumstances prior to their trial. With this obstacle removed, Velu Thampi regained his former influence.

== Nair troop mutiny ==
The armed forces of the kingdom of Travancore consisted predominantly of members of the Nair group of castes. In 1804, Velu Thampi proposed to reduce their allowances to make saving to the treasury and this action was met with immediate discontent. The troops believed that the idea had come from the British and immediately resolved to assassinate both Col. Macaulay and Velu Thampi. With the active support of Thampi's rivals amongst the Nair nobility, the troops abandoned their posts, broke open jails and released the inmates. 10,000 Nair soldiers marched to Trivandrum and demanded that the Maharajah immediately dismiss the Dalawa, end any alliance with the British and appoint their own nominee as the Dalawa. At this time, Velu Thampi was overseeing the renovation of Alappuzha. On the night of 16 April 1804, the Nair soldiers in Alappuzha rebelled and sought to assassinate the Dalwa. Velu Thampi immediately fled again back to Cochin to seek refuge with Col. Macaulay. The Resident collected forces at Cochin and ordered the Carnatic Brigade to accompany Dalawa Velu Thampi to Trivandum. British forces in Tirunelveli and Kollam were instructed to give full support to the Dalawa should it be necessary. On hearing the news, most of the rebels dispersed. At the head of the Carnatic Brigade, Thampi marched to Trivandrum and put an end to the mutiny. Several of its leaders were beheaded, hanged or blown off the cannon's mouth. One of the leaders, Krishna Pillai, a commander of a regiment, had his legs tied to two elephants which were then driven in opposite directions, tearing his body into two, in the presence of the Dalawa; even at that time, Krishna Pillai was riposting Velu Thambi's tuants with harsh criticism of his own against Thambi,. With the executions of large numbers of rebels, Velu Thampi succeeded in crushing the rebellion.

== Alliance with the British ==
The Tranvancore-British Alliance had started in latter part of 1730s when the British had supported Travancore against the Dutch during the Travancore-Dutch War. This relationship had strengthened considerably during the Mysorean invasion of Kerala, especially during the attack on the Battle of the Nedumkotta which was used as a casus belli by the British against Mysore, since the action against Travancore breached the clauses of Treaty of Mangalore between Mysore and the British which had provided protection, thus leading to the Third Anglo-Mysore War. The British forces marched on to Mysore in aid of Tranvancore and Tipu lost the war. The East India Company demanded that the expenses incurred had to be defrayed by Travancore. The Maharaja appealed to Charles Cornwallis, 1st Marquess Cornwallis who took a lenient view of the matter. However, due to the waiving of the bill, Travancore had to accept the presence of a British resident along with some Company troops.

The Treaty signed with the British East India Company by the popular Maharajah Dharma Raja Rama Varma in 1795 was revised in what is known as the Treaty of 1805 (according to the English East India Company's policy of "Subordinate Isolation") after the insurrection of the Nair troops in Travancore. It increased the British Indian force stationed in Travancore and the amount of money to be paid as tribute to the British, though the expenditure of the State in maintaining its own standing army was drastically cut. This was the main change brought about in the Treaty of 1805. Friends and enemies of either the Maharajah or the British were considered as friends and enemies of both, according to this treaty. However the obligation of the Maharajah to assist the Company in a military manner in case of wars, was cancelled. In return, the Company offered to station larger numbers of troops to protect the kingdom in case of external or internal troubles. Under this treaty, the Maharajah was obliged to arrest any other Europeans who were found travelling in Travancore without British permission and hand them over to the British,. Even though under the auspices of this treaty, Travancore could save the money which hitherto had been used to pay the local troops, a subsidy of Rs. 800,000 per annum was due to the English East India company to pay for the costs it incurred on behalf of Travancore.

== Pre-war state of affairs ==
After the conclusion of the Anglo-Mysore wars and the death of Tipu Sultan, Travancore, owing to all its internal problems, found herself facing a serious financial crisis. The ratification of the Treaty with the British by Velu Thampi was intended to help Tranvancore improve its finances significantly, but the action created serious discontent as it increased the dependence of Travancore on the British and also made it indebted to the English Company.

Following the expenses incurred during the rebellions and other troubles along with the costs for the renovation of Alappuzha, the treasury of Travancore remained empty despite the best efforts of Velu Thampi Dalawa. The Dalawa requested for a respite in payment of the sum. Col. Macaulay agreed and stipulated that, in 1805, that Travancore would be allowed to pay the amount in 4 installments instead of one. However, by the end of 1808, the financial situation of Travancore had not improved significantly and the subsidy payment had fallen into a long arrear.

Despite of being fully aware of the financial crisis in Travancore, the Resident, Col. Macaulay, pressed Dalawa Velu Thampi for immediate payment of the long overdue arrears. The Dalawa stated that the revenues of Travancore was incapable of supporting 4 battalions of the Company troops who were stationed in Travancore. The Resident suggested disbanding the Carnatic brigade, an act which would have saved Travancore Rs 150,000 a year. This was deemed as unacceptable by the Dalawa. Velu Thampi's enemies amongst the courtiers openly aired the view that the new treaty was Thampi's doing, forcing him to take a hardened stance to demonstrate his loyalty. The Resident pressed the Dalawa again for payment- a final day was fixed, but Thampi could pay only a part of the arrears. The Resident remonstrated using strong language, which the war-like and proud Thampi found insulting.

The Dalawa instigated the Majarajah to write to the Madras government requesting the recall of the Resident and appointment of a new Resident; this request was denied by the government in Culcutta. But this action, perceived as ingratitude by Col. Macaulay who, previously, had saved Dalawa Thampi's life twice, irrevocably broke down the friendship between the former friends. The Resident pressurised the Dalawa for payments of the arrears immediately. In addition, he demanded that Dalawa Thambi retire on a Company pension of Rs 500 a mensem (month) to be received from Mr. Barber, the collector of Malabar. The Maharajah tried to mediate between the two, but he was unsuccessful given the hotheadedness of both the parties. The Resident started to cultivate the friendships of other important courtiers such as Ramalingam Mudaliar and Sthanapathy Subba Iyer (another one of the courtiers who had helped Thampi become the Dalawa), the latter of which became a close friend and confidante; thus the Resident started to meddle in the affairs of the state and undermine Velu Thampi.

The Dalawa too was disillusioned with the British whom he had considered as friends and who considered any "aggression on Travancore as an aggression on themselves" as per the previous treaties. His frustruation materialised in the form of the assassination of the friend of the British Resident in the Tranvancore court, Sthanapathy Subba Iyer. The Maharajah, who by now also had reasons of his own to be cautious of his Dalawa, had communicated his discontent with the Dalawa to this courtier, Sthanapathy Subba Iyer. This information was known to the Maharajahs wife, Arumana Amma, a noblewomen of the famous Arumana Ammaveedu family. She was a lady of great influence, who apparently communicated Royal secrets to the Dalawa, and she informed the Dalawa of the Maharajah's intention to dismiss Thampi with the support from the Resident. This increased the anger of the Dalawa towards the British. He felt that the Resident, in addition to demanding impossible amounts of money, had now started interfering with the internal affairs of the state.. Following this, Subba Iyer who had met up with the Dalawa in Alleppy for discussions regarding a letter entrusted to him by the Maharajah, was found dead, ostensibly due to a snake bite. However, it seems that Iyer had some premonitions regarding his safety and sought the final farewells of his family prior to his meeting with Dalawa Velu Thampi.

At the same time, in the neighbouring Kingdom of Cochin, Paliyath Govindan Achan, the powerful Dalawa of Cochin, the head of the noble Paliath Achan family and the de facto ruler of Kochi, was involved in deadly feuds of his own with some of the other Nair nobility of Cochin. He had the army commander-in-chief Govinda Menon, along with the previous Dalawa, Rama Menon, seized and drowned in the river at Chanamangalom. He then attempted to kidnap and murder his rival and sworn enemy, the finance minister Nadavarampathu Kunju Krishna Menon. The Maharajah of Cochin was forced to give Nadavarampathu Kunju Krishna Menon refuge in his own palace at Vellarapilli and then sent for Col. Macaulay and requested him to protect Kunju Krishna Menon from the Paliath Achan. Col. Macaulay took Kunju Krishna Menon to the British Residence at Cochin under his own protection. The Achan's demands to surrender Kunjukrishna Menon to him were ignored by the Resident. This act angered Paliyath Achan who then decided to kill not only Kunju Krishna Menon, but also his protector Col. Macaulay as well.

== Insurrection ==
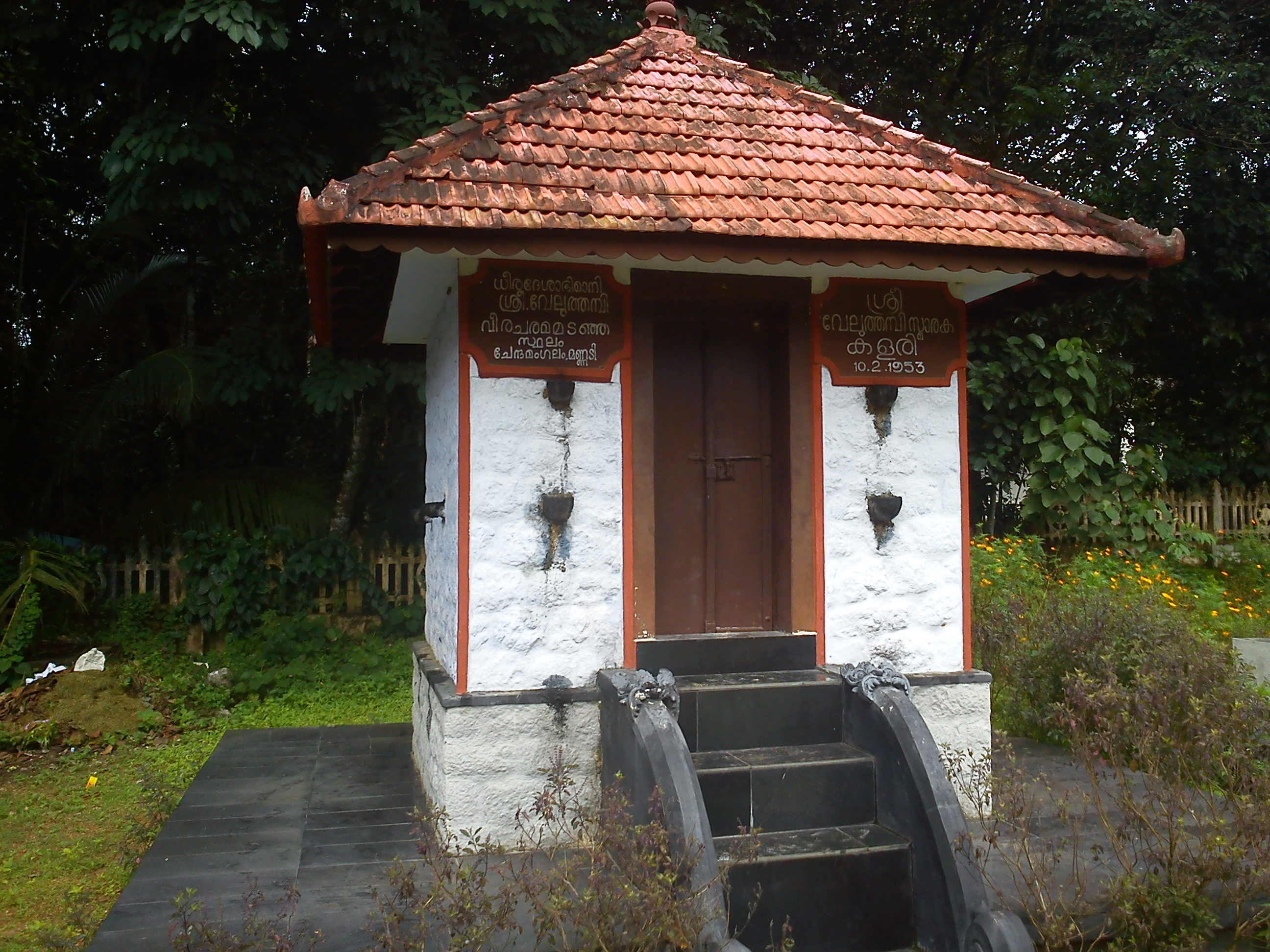
The Mannadi Temple, where Thampi committed suicide

Velu Thampi Dalawa and the Paliath Achan, Govindan Menon, met and decided on the extirpation of the British Resident and end of British supremacy in their respective states. Courtiers such as the illaya Raja (heir apparent) of Travancore supported Velu Thampi but the Maharajahs of both the kingdoms did not openly support their Prime Ministers. Dalawa Velu Thampi organised recruits, strengthened forts and stored up ammunition while similar preparations was made by the Paliath Achan in Cochin. Velu Thampi appealed to the Zamorin of Calicut and to the French for assistance, but both did not acknowledge the request,. The plan of the Paliath Achan and Velu Thampi was to join the respective forces stationed in both Alappuzha and North Paravur and then attack the Fort of Cochin, storm the defences and murder the British Resident Colin Macaulay and Kunju Krishna Menon. Under the leadership of Vaikom Padmanabha Pillai, troops from the garrisons at Alleppey, Alangad and Paravoor were transferred stealthily through the backwaters in covered boats to Kalvathy where they met up with 4,000 of Paliyath Achan's followers. The Resident got wind of the plot and asked the British government for more reinforcements. HM's 12th Regiment along with two native battalions were ordered to march from Malabar and HM's 69th Regiment along with three native battalions and artillery were instructed to march from Tiruchirappalli. Feigning surprise and dismay at the news of the potential rebellion, Thampi requested permission to resign his post and relocate to the Company's territories stating that he feared an attack on his person. On 28 December 1808, a sum of money was set aside for his expenses and relocation from Alappuzha to Kozhikode and Company troops were sent from the residency to the Dalawa's palace at Alappuzha to protect him and escort him to safety.

On the very same night of 28 December 1808, utilising the fact that a large number of troops were en route to Alappuzha to protect the Dalawa, the united force of both the Dalawa and the Achan, consisting of 600 soldiers led by two of Velu Thampi's officers, attacked the Resident's palace at Mulavukad and overwhelmed the few Indian sepoys and domestics. But due to the warning and help of a native clerk, the Resident and Kunju Krishna Menon managed to escape to a secret room. The attacking army plundered the house, and on failing to capture/kill the Resident and Kunju Krishna Menon, executed the captive sepoys and native domestics. At day break, Col Macaulay and Kunku Krishna Menon managed to flee to the frigate HMS Piedmontese, which arrived in Cochin harbour with reinforcements from Malabar. Almost simultaneously, the rebels attacked the British garrison at Quilon on 30 December 1808 which was defended by Col. Chalmers. Five companies of native sepoys reached Quilon in time and helped repulse the attack.

Dissatisfied with the failure to capture or kill the Resident, as well as the failure at Quilon, Velu Thampi moved south from Cochin and on 11 January 1809 (1st Makaram 984 M.E.), he issued his famous Kundara Proclamation in which he exhorted the nation to throw out the British. He then organised another force, 20,000-30,000 strong to attack the British garrison at Quilon and the Battle of Quilon took place on 15 January 1809 in which Velu Thampi's force lost 15 guns and suffered around 700 casualties. On 18 January 1809, the rebel forces at Quilon were totally defeated after a 6 hour fight when they attempted to storm the Quilon garrison,.

Velu Thampi then sent a part of his force to launch another amphibious attack on the British garrison at Cochin, which was defended by Major Hewitt. On 19 January 1809, the Cochin garrison comprising of six companies of Indian infantry and 50 European infantry, led by Major Hewitt, supported by the frigate HMS Piedmontese, along with some boats manned by Nair soldiers loyal to Paliyath Achan's many rivals and enemies amongst the Cochin nobility, successfully repelled another amphibious attack carried out by a 3,000-strong army on the Cochin garrison. The attackers lost over 300 troops along with their artillery battery which had been set up at Vypin. Sporadic attacks took place in Kochi on the 21st of January 1809 and on the 25th of January 1809 by which time most of the attackers had been taken prisoner.

On the 30th of January 1809, a small force of 3 military officers and 30 European soldiers from HM's 12th Regiment, en route from Kollam to Kochi, were captured and executed by drowning at Purakkad beach on the Dalawa's orders, even though one of the officers, Surgeon Hume, had treated Velu Thampi in the past. A sick lady, who was a member of this party, was permitted to travel unharmed to Cochin, since it was contrary to the laws of Travancore to kill women.

In the aftermath of the battle at Quilon, Velu Thampi moved to the southern border of Travancore to bolster the defence at Aramboly pass located at Aralvaimozhi. The two mile long fortifications, built according to Euopean standards in the 1750s by the Dutch-born Travancore general, the late Eustachius De Lannoy at the Aramboly pass in response to Chanda Sahib's invasion of Travancore, consisted of masonry walls, bastions and had around 50 artillery pieces and 10,000 soldiers covering the road from Palayamkottai to defend it in the event of a frontal attack from that road. On 6 February 1809, a force under the Hon. Col. St. Leger marched from Tiruchirappalli with HM's 69th Regiment, a battalion of native cavalry, 3 battalions of native infantry and a detachment of artillery and reached the fortified lines at Aramboly. On the morning of 10 February 1809, the British, under Major Welsh attacked the flanks of the fortified lines from the southern mountain. One East India company Sepoy and Captain Cunningham of the 69th Regiment were killed but the British took the fortified lines and Velu Thampi fled,. The British forces moved into the interior of Travancore on 17 February 1809, and were held up by around 600 Thampi's men who were entrenched in a fortified dugout in Kottar. These soldiers were routed by Col. McLeod, 9 guns were captured and severe casualties inflicted. The British lost forty nine sepoys, a native officer of the HM's 69th Regiment and Lt. Swayne and Capt. Lemo of the 13th Native infantry. On the 19th of February, the strategic forts of Udayagiri and Padmanabhapuram fell to the British without a fight. The treasury was empty, but the British captured 16 elephants, some 50,000 arms and some 100 artillery pieces including some 22-pounder cannon and an 18 inch bore mortar and gilded swords,. On hearing the news, the rebels at Quilon dispersed and Col. Chalmers approached Trivandrum from the North and camped 12 miles to the north of Trivandrum and the Hon. Col. St. Leger approached from the south, in a pincer movement.

== Death of Velu Thampi ==
On hearing about the approach of the British forces, Velu Thampi fled from Trivandrum icognito to Kilimanoor where he gave his sword as a token of gratitude to the Kilimanoor Koil Thampurans of Kilimanoor Palace who had given him food and shelter in his time of need. Meanwhile, the Maharajah of Travancore, who officially, hitherto, had stayed neutral, suddenly turned against Dalawa Thampi and denounced him; furthermore, he actively facilitated the communications between the two British camps. On 24 February 1809, the Hon. Col. St. Leger had a letter delivered to the Maharajah demanding the surrender of Dalawa Thambi. The Maharajah appointed one of his nobility, Marthandam Eravi Ummini Thampi, a sworn enemy of Velu Thampi, as the mediator between Travancore and the British. Ummini Thampi reached the British forces who were camped at Pappanamcode and conveyed the Maharajah's terms to them. On 26 February, the armistice was signed. 140 pieces of cannon, 14,000 stands of muskets and bayonets and ammunition, gathered by Velu Thampi, were turned over to the British. A reward of 50,000 Travancore Rupees (around £3,800 at the time, adjusted to £387,000 or ₹49,810,850 in 2026), a princely sum in those days, was offered for Velu Thampi's capture and both Travancore and British officers were deployed to find him.

On the 18 March 1809, the Maharajah appointed Ummuni Thampi as Dalawa with the blessings of the British who gave him a salute of 15 guns. The new Dalawa's officials tracked the former Dalawa Velu Thampi to the forests of Kunnathur, Kerala. Velu Thampi fled from there and took refuge with a priest at Mannadi. A local shopkeeper on noticing that an impoverished servant had some expensive gold utensils on his person, informed Dalawa Ummini Thampi's soldiers. This servant, who was an employee of the former Dalawa, was arrested by the new Dalawa's officials, who then interrogated him to elicit all the information regarding Velu Thampi. On hearing this, Velu Thampi and his brother Padmanabhan Thampi, fled to the Bhagavathy temple at Mannadi. There, when the temple was surrounded by the would-be captors who demanded that he surrender to them, the former Dalawa Velu Thampi committed suicide with his dagger, aided by his brother who delivered the Coup de grâce,,. Velu Thampi's brother Padmanabhan Thampi was caught at the scene. The body of Velu Thampi was exposed in the gibbet at Kannammoola. Lord Minto, the then Governor General, strongly condemned this act, describing the act as "repugnant to the feelings of common humanity and the principles of a civilised government". The man who was instrumental providing the information regarding Velu Thampi's final refuge, was granted the promised reward of 50,000 Travancore Rupees.

== Aftermath of the rebellion ==
During the trial for the murder of prisoners on the 30 January 1809 at Purrakad beach, Padmanabhan Thampi was found guilty of complicity in the act and was hanged at Kollam on 10 April 1809, in the presence of the HM's 12th regiment, to which the victims had belonged to. Dalawa Ummuni Thampi took a brutal revenge on the family of his sworn enemy Dalawa Velu Thampi by levelling their ancestral house to the ground and had bananas and castor plants grown in the ruin. He most of Velu Thampi's family banished to the Maldives. Some of the immediate family members took their own lives to escape the dishonour and others were flogged.

Other leaders of the revolt such as Vaikom Padmanabha Pillai were executed by hanging at key locations such as Kollam, Purakkad and Pallathuruthy.

The Maharajah of Cochin, Rama Varma X had passed away due to natural causes in January 1809. The Paliyath Achan surrendered to the British on the 27th of February 1809 and was exiled first to Madras and then, on 1821, he was pensioned off to Benares where he died in 1832. Following the defeat of the Paliyath Achan's forces, the English East India Company signed the Subsidiary alliance with the new Maharajah, Kerala Varma III of Kingdom of Cochin on 6 May 1809, in accordance to which the Raja offered to pay Rs. 176,0237 per annum to support the establishment of one battalion of the Company's infantry to protect the kingdom.

The Paliath Achan's archnemesis, Kunju Krishna Menon, succeeded him as the Dalawa of Cochin,. He took brutal revenge on his enemies and did not pay any arrears, but despite the complaints of the Maharajah, he was protected as long as his friend Col. Macaulay was the Resident. In June 1812, following discussions with Col. Munro he retired on a generous pension and in the later years, one of his daughters married one of the Maharajahs of Travancore, Ayilyam Thirunal. Col. Munro took charge as the Diwan of Cochin in June 1812. Cochin State had a debt of 6 lakh Rupees along with arrears of the subsidy. Law was strictly enforced, highway robbers were caught and executed in front of the houses of their victims. Land revenue was significantly improved and within a span of seven years, Kingdom of Cochin was able to pay off all debts and arrears. In February 1818, Col. Munro retired from the post of Diwan and one of his mentees, Shri Nanjappayya of Coimbatore, was appointed the Diwan of Kochi.

Thachil Matthoo Tharakan regained his former job as a minister of the Travancore Kingdom.

Maharajah Balarama Varma died at midnight on the 7th of November 1810 (26th Tulam, 986 ME) and Maharani Gowri Lakshmi Bayi took charge of the Kingdom first as Maharani and then as Queen Regent. The reign of Maharani Gowri Lakshmi Bayi was a very englightened one and resulted in reduction of taxes, increased social justice, establishment of schools and hospitals.

Due to ill health, Col. Macaulay retired in October 1810 and left for Great Britain and died at Clifton near Bristol on the 20th of February 1836, where he was buried.

Ummini Thampi Dalawa improved the finances of the kingdom and cleared the forest between Neyyattinkara and Thiruvananthapuram. He settled a colony of weavers at the site of the cleared jungle and thus established the town of Balaramapuram. He planned the development of a port at Vizhinjam but following disagreements with the new Rani, he was dismissed in 1811, and the then British resident, Col. John Munro, 9th of Teaninich, was appointed as Dalawa. With the blessings of the Rani, Col. Munro was very strict in imposing justice and bringing back order to the kingdom, as Velu Thampi had been; furthermore, he adopted some of Velu Thampi's methods such as corporal punishment in destroying corruption amongst Sirkar (government) officials. He also adopted Velu Thampi's efficient taxation system and was eventually able to improve the state of the treasury to such an extent that not only the arrears to the Company were met, but also the debts to the merchants of Thirnevelly, Cochin and Kottar were paid in full. Col. Munro, who refused to accept any financial remuneration from Travancore for his services as Dalawa, was well-liked by the people of Travancore. After the dismissal, Ummini Thampi's continued machinations resulted in him getting jailed, punished and sentenced to death. One of the reasons that turned the Maharani and the other nobility against him was his churlishness and brutality in dealing with the family of his vanquished foe (Velu Thampi). The threats he made against the Illya Raja (heir apparent) who had been a staunch friend and supporter of Velu Thampi Dalawa also contributed to ill-feelings against him and his continued plotting of the death of Col. Munro, who had replaced him as the Dalawa, exacerbated the situation. However, on the appeal of Col. Munro, the sentence was commuted and he was finally banished to Nellore in 1813 where he disappeared from history. In 1814, on the advice of Col. Munro, the Maharani selected Dewan Padmanabha Thampi (a mentee of Col. Munro) as the Dalawa. Col. Munro continued as the Resident till 1819 when ill health forced him to leave and died on the 26th of January 1858 in Scotland.

After the revolt of 1809, the army of Travancore was reduced to a mere 700 soldiers and a few cavalry. This number was increased to 1200 in 1817 (2 Nair battalions and 1 company of cavalry) by Col. Munro, under the command of Captain McLeod and then was increased to 2100 rifle armed infantry, a cavalry unit and artillery composed of contemporary 6 pounders and 9 pounders by 1819, forming the nucleus of the reformed Nair Brigade which was later integrated into the 9th Battalion, Madras Regiment, the oldest extant unit in the Indian Army.

== Honours ==
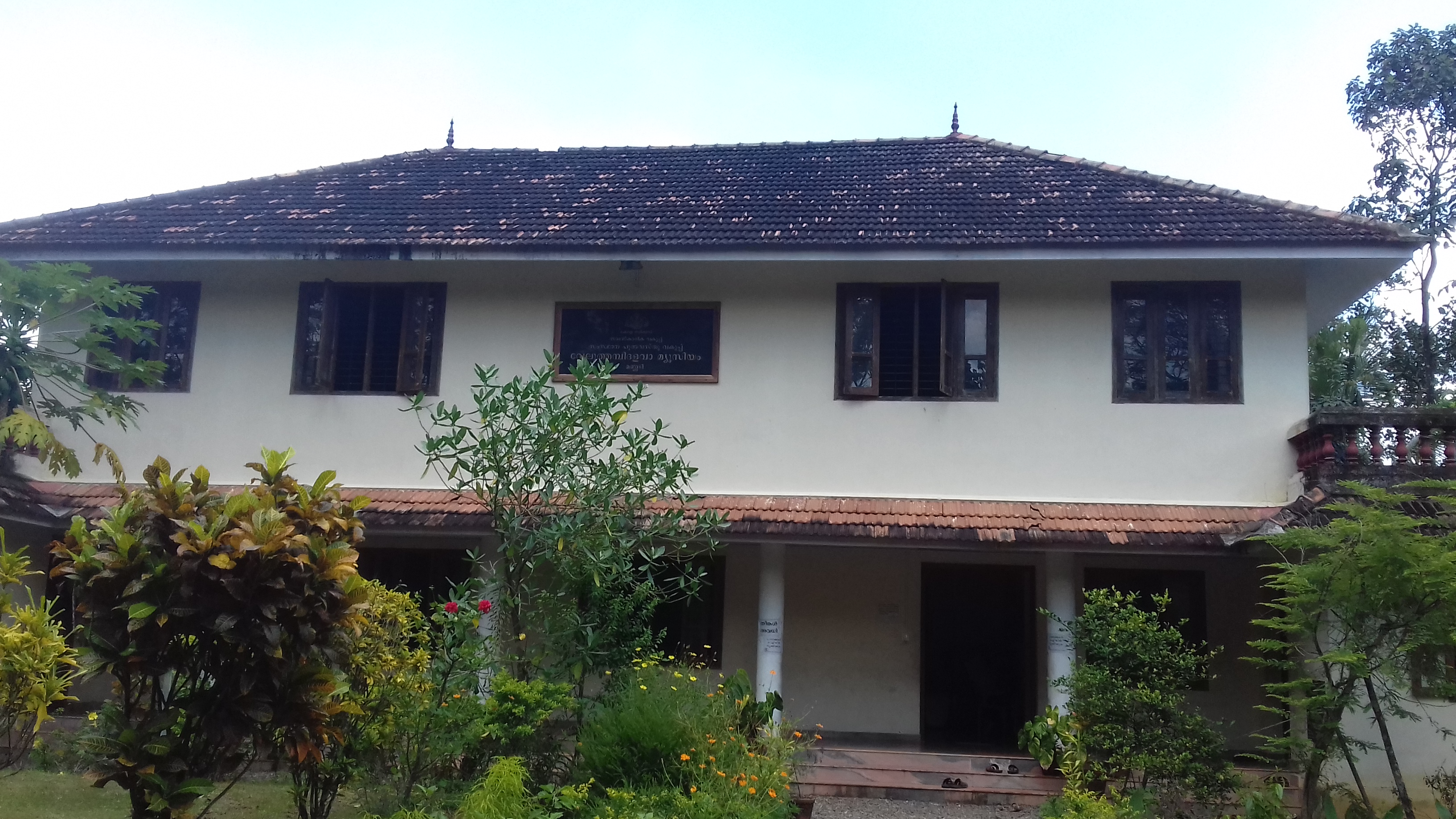
Velu Thampi Dalawa Museum, Mannadi

The sword that was used by Velu Thampi Dalawa in his fight against the British, was kept with the Kilimanoor royal family, for about 150 years. It was presented in 1957, to India's then president Rajendra Prasad by a member of the royal family. On 20 June 2010 it was brought back to Kerala and was placed in the Napier Museum (Art Museum)Thiruvananthapuram, Kerala.

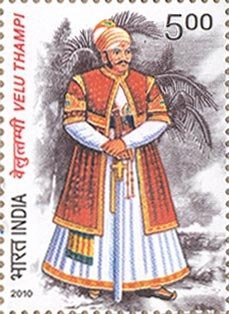
Stamp of Velu Thampi

A commemorative postage stamp on him was issued on 6 May 2010.
