= Lal Bahadur Shastri Stadium, Kollam =

Sports venue in Kollam, India

Lal Bahadur Shastri Corporation Stadium
- Corporation Stadium; LBS Stadium
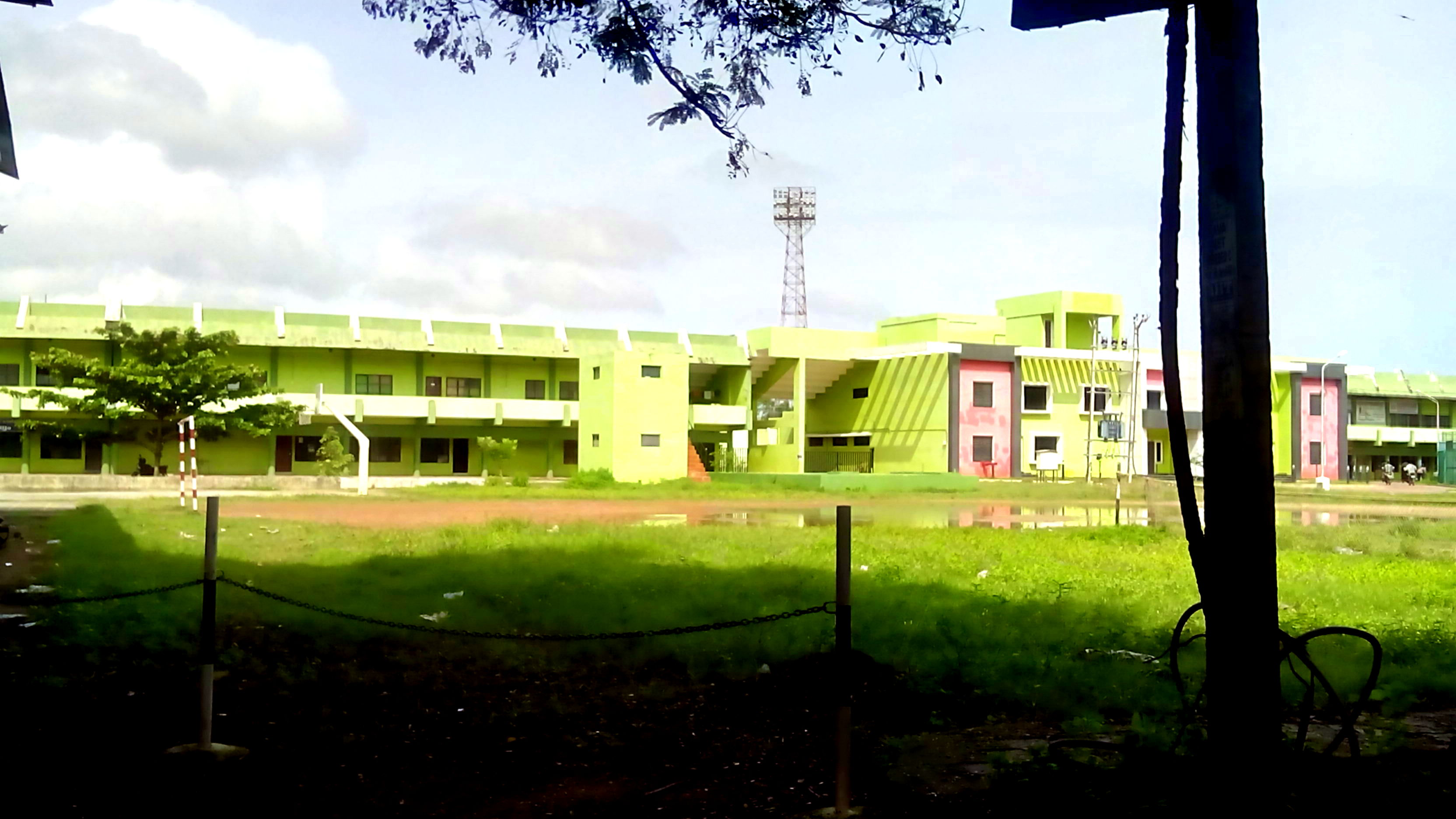

- Location of stadium in Kollam city Lal Bahadur Shastri Corporation Stadium (Kerala) Lal Bahadur Shastri Corporation Stadium (India)
- Former names: Corporation Stadium
- Location: Cantonment, Kollamformerly known as QUILON, India
- Coordinates: 8.8831°N 76.5990°E
- Owner: Corporation of Kollam
- Operator: Corporation of Kollam
- Capacity: 40,000
- Surface: Grass
- Field size: 44mX20.8m

Construction
- Opened: 1966
- Renovated: 1988,2011

The Lal Bahadur Shastri Corporation Stadium is a stadium in Kollam. Recently renovated, the venue hosts football matches. The Sports Authority of India has a training centre in this stadium.

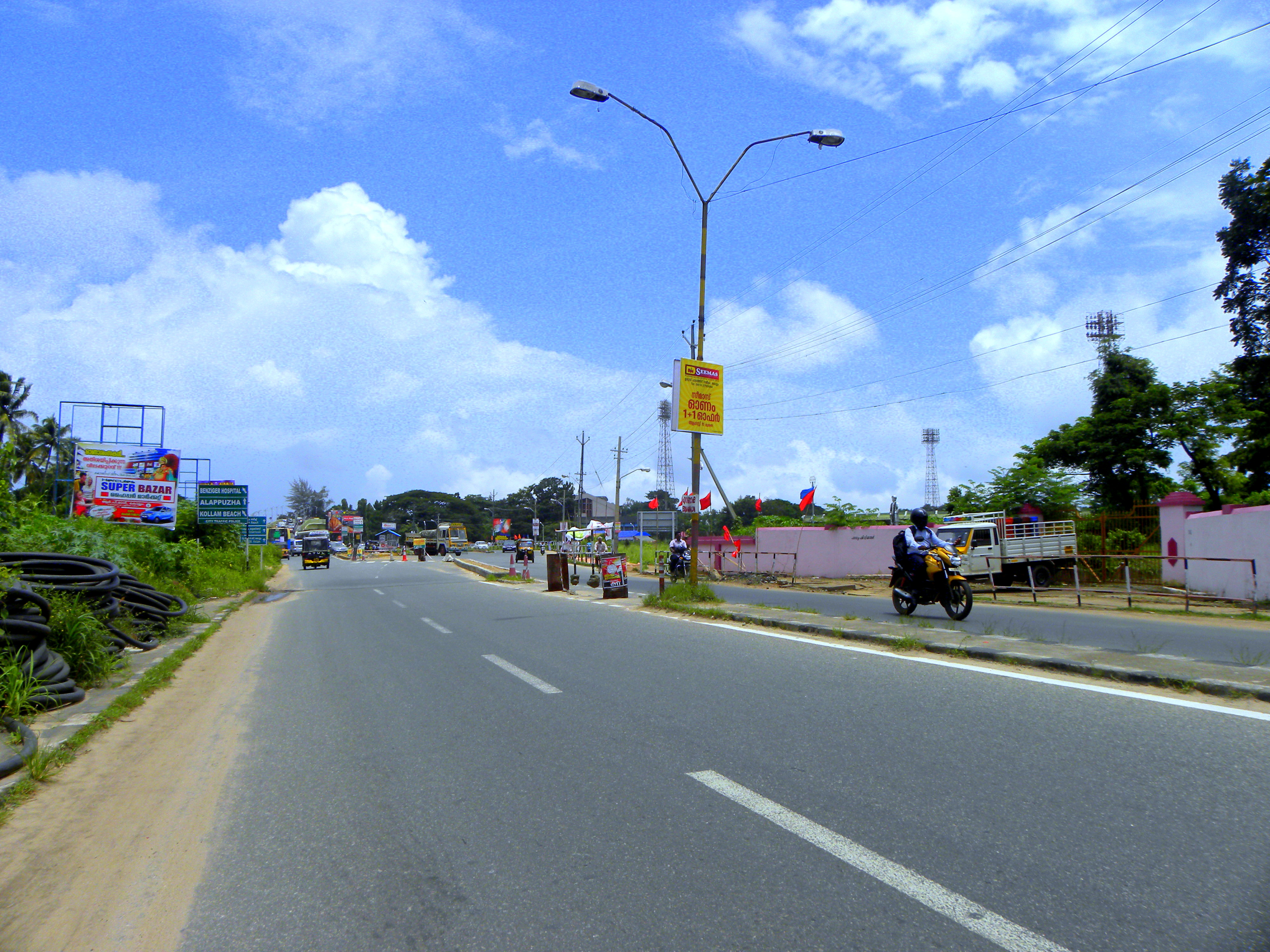
New flyover Junction near Lal Bahadur Shastri Stadium, Kollam

== History ==
The Lal Bahadur Shastri Stadium was established in 1988. The stadium is located at Cantonment area in Kollam city. This is a multi-purpose stadium, suitable for playing cricket, football, rugby 7s and athletics. The matting type of pitch is used in this stadium which is very much suitable for playing cricket.

== Renovations ==
- Construction of a new pavilion of size 44mX20.8m
- Change room and toilet for players
- Media work station
- VIP rest room
- Repair of Gallery
- Turfing of play area using Mexican grass
- Providing chain link fencing around the play area

== Hosted sports and events ==
The stadium has hosted Ranji Trophy Matches of Kerala in 1979 and 1988. College End and Road End are the end names used during the cricket matches.

The stadium also hosted Santosh Trophy Football Matches during 1965, 1973, 1988 and 2013

Kerala First-Class Cricket Matches played on Lal Bahadur Shastri Stadium, Kollam(Quilon)
Year	Date	Tournament	Teams Played
1979	3 November	Ranji Trophy 1979/80	Kerala vs Andhra
1988	10 December	Ranji Trophy 1988/89	Kerala vs Goa
1988	17 December	Ranji Trophy 1988/89	Kerala vs Karnataka

Santosh Trophy Football Matches played on Lal Bahadur Shastri Stadium, Kollam(Quilon)
Year	Date	Tournament	Teams Played
2013	22 February	Santosh Trophy 2013/14	Tamil Nadu Vs Goa
2013	22 February	Santosh Trophy 2013/14	Maharashtra Vs Jharkhand
2013	23 February	Santosh Trophy 2013/14	Manipur Vs Punjab
2013	23 February	Santosh Trophy 2013/14	West Bengal Vs Karnataka
2013	24 February	Santosh Trophy 2013/14	Goa Vs Maharashtra
2013	24 February	Santosh Trophy 2013/14	Jharkhand Vs Tamil Nadu
2013	25 February	Santosh Trophy 2013/14	Punjab Vs West Bengal
2013	25 February	Santosh Trophy 2013/14	Karnataka Vs Manipur
2013	26 February	Santosh Trophy 2013/14	Tamil Nadu Vs Maharashtra
2013	26 February	Santosh Trophy 2013/14	Goa Vs Jharkhand
2013	27 February	Santosh Trophy 2013/14	Manipur Vs West Bengal
2013	27 February	Santosh Trophy 2013/14	Punjab Vs Karnataka

== See also ==
- Kollam
- Kollam district
- Kollam Junction railway station
