= Thiruvanchikulam Temple =

Thiruvanchikulam Temple തിരുവഞ്ചിക്കുളം ക്ഷേത്രം
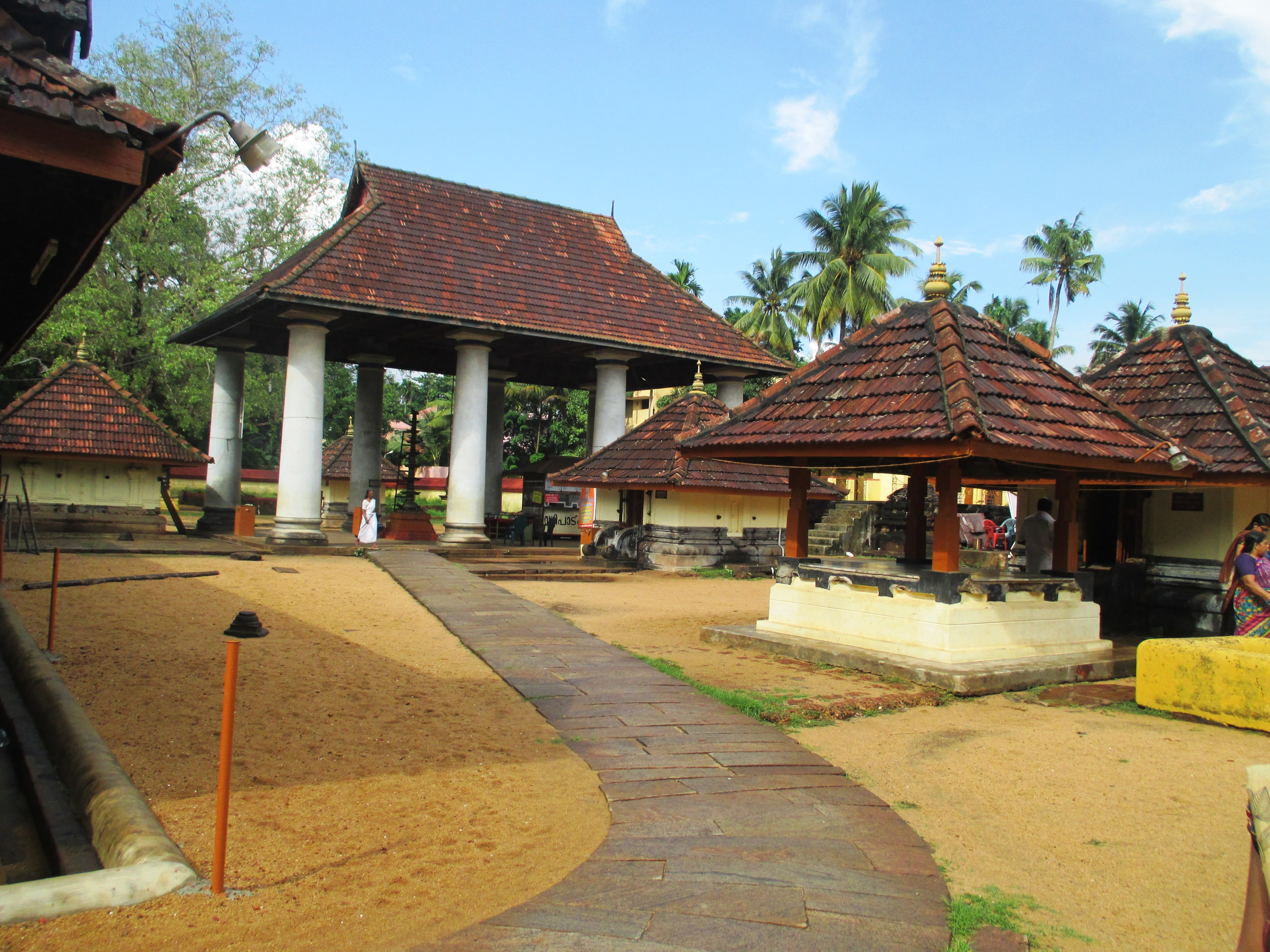

- Thiruvanchikulam Temple (Kerala) Thiruvanchikulam Temple (India)
- 10°12′37″N 76°12′24″E
- Location: Thrissur, Kerala, India

History
- Built: 9th century CE

Site notes
- Elevation: 27.98

Thiruvanchikulam Siva Temple (medieval Thiruvanchaikkalam Temple) is a Hindu temple situated in Kodungallur in Thrissur district of Kerala state, India. Constructed in the Kerala style of architecture, the temple is believed to have been built during the Chera period. Shiva is worshipped as Mahadeva and his consort Parvathi as Umadevi. There are 33 sub-deities in this temple, the highest number so in Kerala.

The presiding deity is revered in the 7th-century-CE Tamil Saiva canonical work, the Tevaram, written by Tamil saint poets known as the Nayanmars and classified as Paadal Petra Sthalam, one of the 276 temples that find mention in the canon. It is the only temple in Kerala in the list. As per Periyapuranam, Sundara Murthi Nayanar, one of the four great saints in Tamil Shivism ascended to heaven from this place. Cheraman Perumal, the traditional legedary king of Kerala, is believed to went to ‘Kailasa’ with his companion Saiva saint, Sundaramoorthi Nayanar from this temple premises.

== History ==
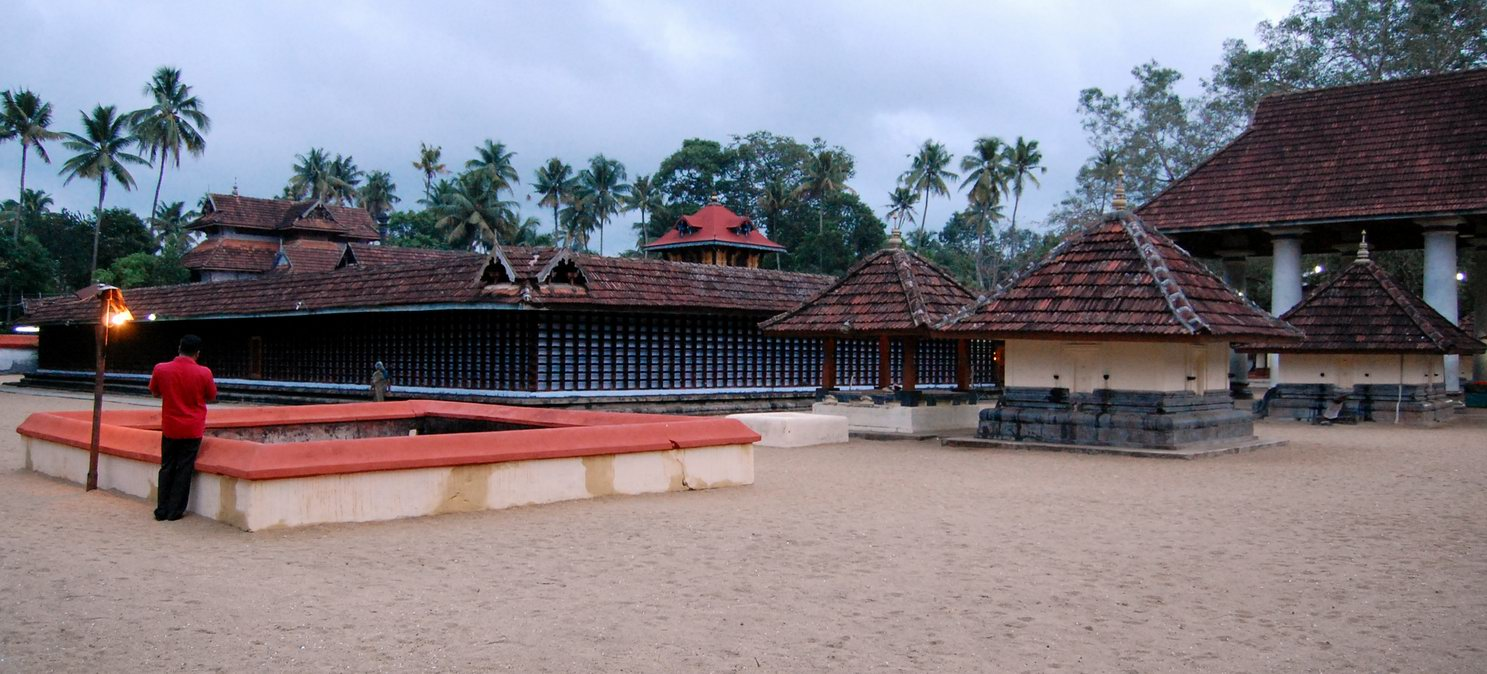
Image of the temple

This is the only Thevaram Paadal Petra Shiva sthalam in Kerala. Shiva is the family god of the Cochin Royal Family (Perumpadapu Swaroopam) after they came to power following the decline of Chera Empire). The temple has very good mural paintings and is a protected monument by the Archaeological Survey of India. The national anthem of erstwhile kingdom of Travancore, Vanchi Bhumi refers to the deity of this temple, the official deity of imperial Chera Empire from whom the former claim lineage. The temple has the oldest reference in history in Thevaram Hymns sung by Sundara Murthi Nayanar (also known as Sundarar in Tamil), one of the four Saiva Acharyas. The images of Sundara Murthi Nayanar, and of Cheraman Perumal Nayanar can also be seen in the temple premises. It is one of the oldest Shiva temples in South India, where Shiva is said to live along with his whole family. It was from here, Sundara Murthi Nayanar reached Kailash by sitting on a white elephant, sent by Lord Shiva on Adi Swathi day (July/August). He was followed on horse back by Seraman Perumal Nayanar. On his way to Kailash, Sundara Murthi Nayanar sang a Padhigam which was sent back to Thiruvanchikulam on his request. The temple is associated with Chidambaram temple in Tamil Nadu.

The capital city of the Kulasekharas, Mahodayapuram, was built around the temple; it was protected by high fortifications on all sides and had extensive pathways and palaces. This temple was attacked and damaged during Tipu Sultan's invasion of Kerala; the copper roofing, gold and jewels were looted. Tipu's Muslim soldiers fled the temple complex only after the arrival of the Travancore Army of Dalawa Keshavadas Pillai. The temple was rebuilt by Paliath Achan of the Paliam Swaroopam.

== Architecture ==
The temple is built in Kerala style of architecture with entrance towers in all four sides. The sanctum occupies the centre portion of the temple, which is fortified. The sanctum is approached through a flagstaff, which is axial to the entrance tower and the sanctum. The flagstaff has images of Asthavidyesavara. The presiding deity is in the form of lingam. The image of Narasimha is sculpted on the vimana. The images of Sundarar and Ceramanperuman are maintained at Bhagavathi temple and brought to the temple during Svati festival during July – August. There are two temple tanks in the temple, located in the second precinct.

== Religious importance and festivals ==
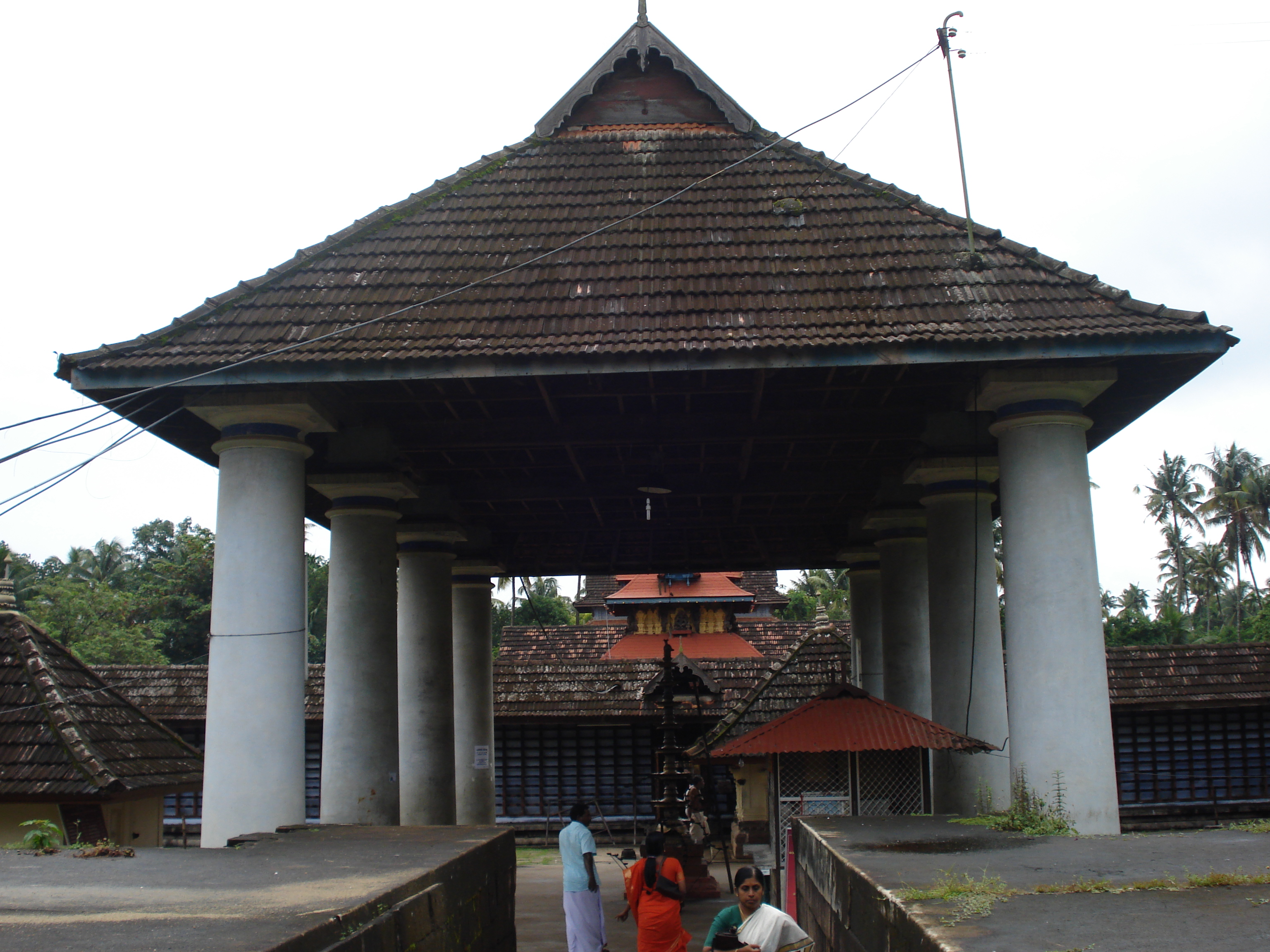
Image of the entrance

It is believed that it the temple where Parasurama, an avatar of Vishnu, worshiped Shiva to expiate his sin killing his mother Renuka. Sundarar, a 7th-century Tamil Saivite poet, venerated Mahadeva in ten verses in Tevaram, compiled as the Seventh Tirumurai. As the temple is revered in Tevaram, it is classified as Paadal Petra Sthalam, one of the 276 temples that find mention in the Saiva canon. The temple is believed to be the place where Sundarar and king Cheraman spent their last days and believed to have ascended to Kailasa in a white elephant.

Brahmotsavam during the Malayalam month of Edavam (May – June) is the most important festivals of the temple.

== Photogallery ==
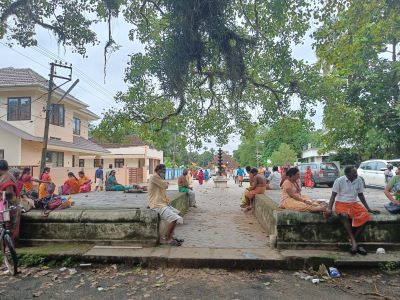

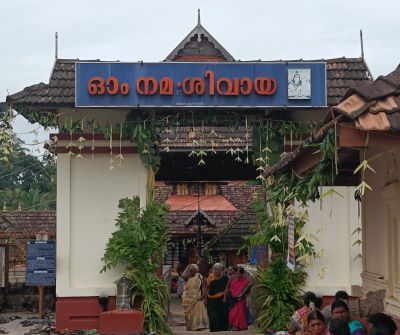

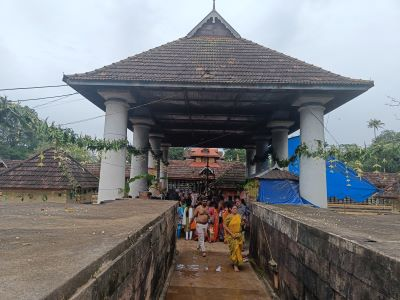

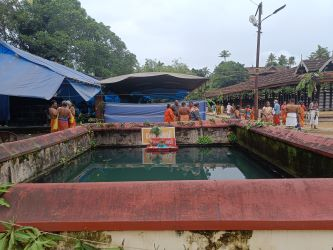

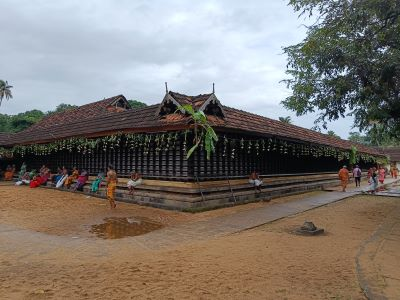

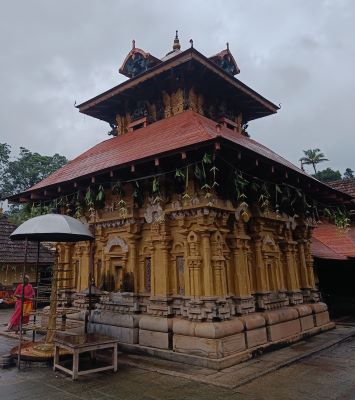

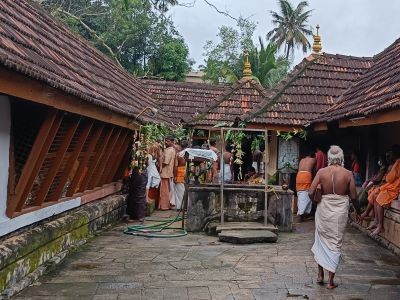

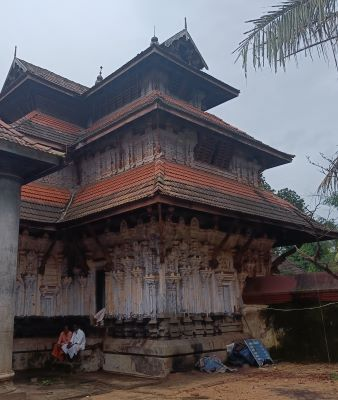
