= Vanchi Bhumi =

National anthem of Travancore between 1937-1949

Vanchi Bhumi വഞ്ചി ഭൂമി
English: The Lord of Vanchi
- Flag of the Kingdom of Travancore
- National anthem of Travancore
- Lyrics: Ulloor S. Parameswara Iyer
- Adopted: 1937
- Relinquished: 1947

Audio sample
- National Anthem of Travancore sung by Kamala Krishnamurthy in 1937 played in Travancore Radio Station: file; help

Vanchi Bhumi (alternatively Vanji Bhumi) was the national anthem of the erstwhile Kingdom of Travancore which now forms part of Kerala. It was formally known as the Vanchishamangalam meaning "Hail the Lord of Vanchi". It was played by the Travancore radio every night as the last item.

Vanchi Bhumi, meaning the "Land of Vanchi", is a reference to the city of Thiruvanchikulam, Kodungallur the capital of the Later Cheras, and the "Lord of Vanchi", the Later Chera's tutelary deity, Vanchinathan, a name for Hindu god Shiva.

Written in Malayalam language, it was the anthem of the Kingdom of Travancore until 1947, and the merger of Kingdom of Travancore with India.

== Lyrics ==
Malayalam

വഞ്ചിഭൂമിപതേ ചിരം
സഞ്ജിതാഭം ജയിക്കേണം

ദേവദേവൻ ഭവാനെന്നും
ദേഹസൗഖ്യം വളർത്തേണം
വഞ്ചിഭൂമിപതേ ചിരം

ത്വച്ചരിതമെന്നും ഭൂമൗ
വിശൃതമായി വിളങ്ങേണം
വഞ്ചിഭൂമിപതേ ചിരം

മർത്യമനമേതും ഭവാൽ
പത്തനമായി ഭവിക്കേണം
വഞ്ചിഭൂമിപതേ ചിരം

താവകമാം കുലം മേന്മേൽ
ശ്രീവളർന്നുല്ലസിക്കേണം
വഞ്ചിഭൂമിപതേ ചിരം

മാലകറ്റി ചിരം
പ്രജാപാലനം ചെയ്തരുളേണം
(വഞ്ചിഭൂമിപതേ ചിരം....)

Romanisation

vañcibhūmipatē ciraṁ
sañjitābhaṁ jayikkēṇaṁ

dēvadēvan bhavānennuṁ
dēhasakhyaṁ vaḷarttēṇaṁ
vañcibhūmipatē ciraṁ

tvaccaritamennuṁ bhūmau
viśr̥tamāyi viḷaṅgēṇaṁ
vañcibhūmipatē ciraṁ

martyamanamētuṁ bhavāl
pattanamāyi bhavikkēṇaṁ
vañcibhūmipatē ciraṁ

tāvakamāṁ kulaṁ mēnmēl
śrīvaḷarnnullasikkēṇaṁ
vañcibhūmipatē ciraṁ

mālakaṟṟi ciraṁ
prajāpālanaṁ ceytaruḷēṇaṁ
(vañcibhūmipatē ciraṁ...)

Translation

O Lord of Vanchi Land!
Thou should hail forever, most gloriously!

The God of gods*, the Lord*, daily
Shall promote thy physical well-being!
O Lord of Vanchi Land!

Thy legend, in earth, daily,
Should be famous and glorified;
O Lord of Vanchi Land!

All of the human minds
Should be thy abode;
O Lord of Vanchi Land!

The family of thine
Should prosper graciously.
O Lord of Vanchi Land!

Evading the sadness, forever
Thou should protect the subjects.
O Lord of Vanchi Land!
Thou should hail forever, most gloriously!

== External links for Audio ==
- Vancheesha Mangalam as recorded by the Travancore Government in 1938.
- Audio of the Anthem.
