= Travancore fanam =

Obsolete currency of Travancore

The fanam was a type of money that was issued by the Kingdom of Travancore, now mostly encompassing the modern day state of Kerala in India. The fanams (also spelt fanoms) and chuckrams (or chakrams) were known to be some of the smallest coins in the world. Historically, the fanam and chuckram coins were the regular unit of currency in medieval Travancore and appear to have been extensively used for trading in the region. The words fanam and panam mean "money" in certain Dravidian languages like Malayalam which was the most spoken language in the kingdom.

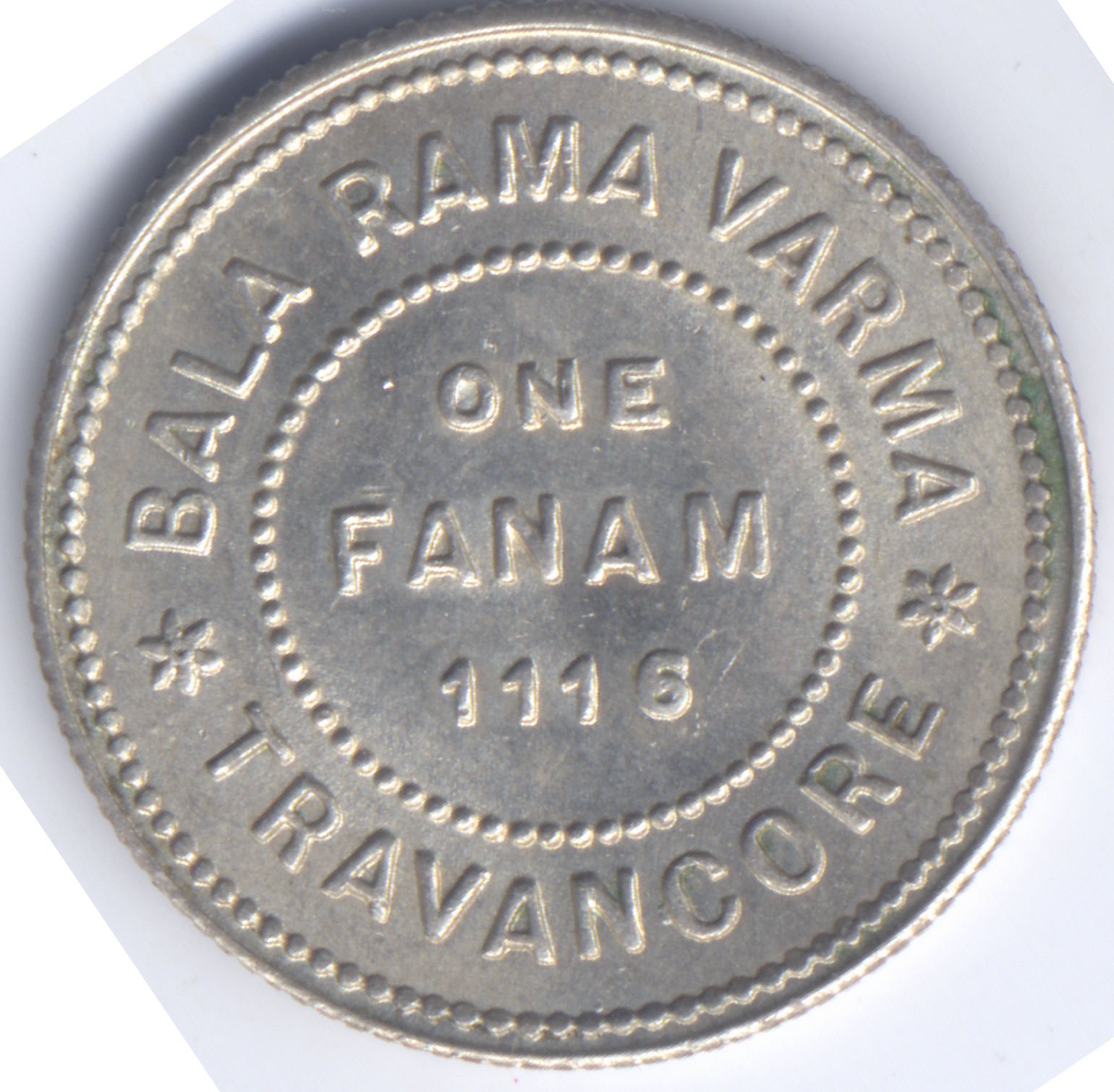
Travancore Fanam (front) – Malayalam era 1116

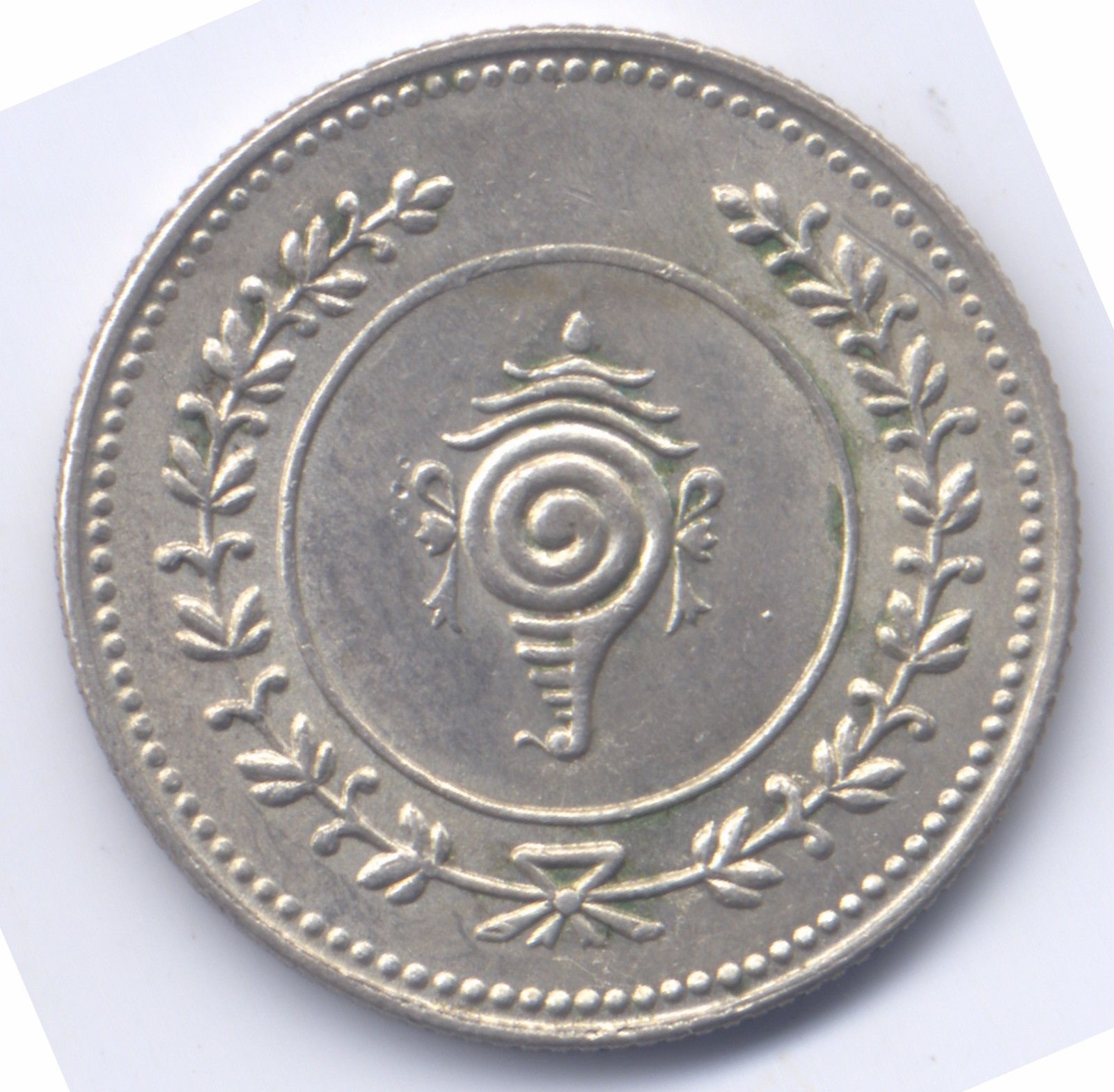
Travancore Fanam (reverse)

== History ==
The Panam (lit. 'fanam') coins were part of the traditional coinage in ancient Kerala and the time when these coins were issued is not verifiably known. Panam coins rose in popularity some time in the 13th century and remained as one of the most popular currencies in circulation in the following centuries. Other versions of the Fanams are also known to have been minted in Kerala by the kingdoms of Cochin and Calicut. The adjoining States in modern-day Tamil Nadu, Karnataka and Sri Lanka are also known to have had their own versions of the Fanams. By the 18th century, the reduction in precious metal content had rendered the Travancore Fanam coins so small that they had become difficult to count. They were counted by pouring them in a pile onto a counting board (called palakas) and shaking them into the holes on the surface of the board.

The modern version of the Travancore Fanams were introduced into circulation around the year 1800 (975 ME) with a value equal to 4 Chuckrams. These modern versions were minted in Trivandrum (now called Thiruvananthapuram) with the aid of stamping presses obtained from Madras Presidency. Later issues were minted using presses procured from England. While the older versions of the Fanams were based on gold or silver, these newer coins were primarily based on silver. They were issued until 1946–47 remaining in circulation until 1949 before being replaced by the Indian Rupee and Anna system.

== Inscriptions ==
Older issues of the Panam coins are inscribed with various symbols representing religious deities or nature, but issues since the 1860s often had the names or insignia of the reigning monarch in English. The Fanam coins, when written in English, appear to display something similar to an Anglo-Germanic sound shift (termed as Grimm's law) from the traditional term "Panam".

The year, when printed on the Fanam coins was based on the Malayalam calendar (and corresponding Malayalam Era – ME) which begins circa 825 AD. Therefore, the year of issue of the coin can be found by adding 825 to it. For example, the year of issue of a coin showing 1000 ME, will be 1825 AD. Therefore, the year of issue of the coin with year 1116, will be 1940–41.

Seven fanams made up one rupee, while the fanam was composed of 4 chuckrams. These chuckrams were further divided into 16 cash.

Unit	Equivalent Sub-units
1 Travancore Rupee	7 Fanams
1 Fanam	4 Chuckrams
1 Chuckram	16 Cash

== See also ==
- Travancore
- Travancore rupee
- Indian rupee
- Madras fanam
