= Travancore rupee =

Official currency of the kingdom of Travancore

The Travancore rupee was a form of currency issued by the erstwhile Indian princely state of Travancore, which was primarily located in the modern Indian state of Kerala. The rupee was largely a newer currency in comparison to the older currencies of Travancore such as the Fanams, Achus, Chuckrams as well as the Kasu (or Cash). Its creation was probably intended for the increase in trade with the British and the high-value transactions therein.

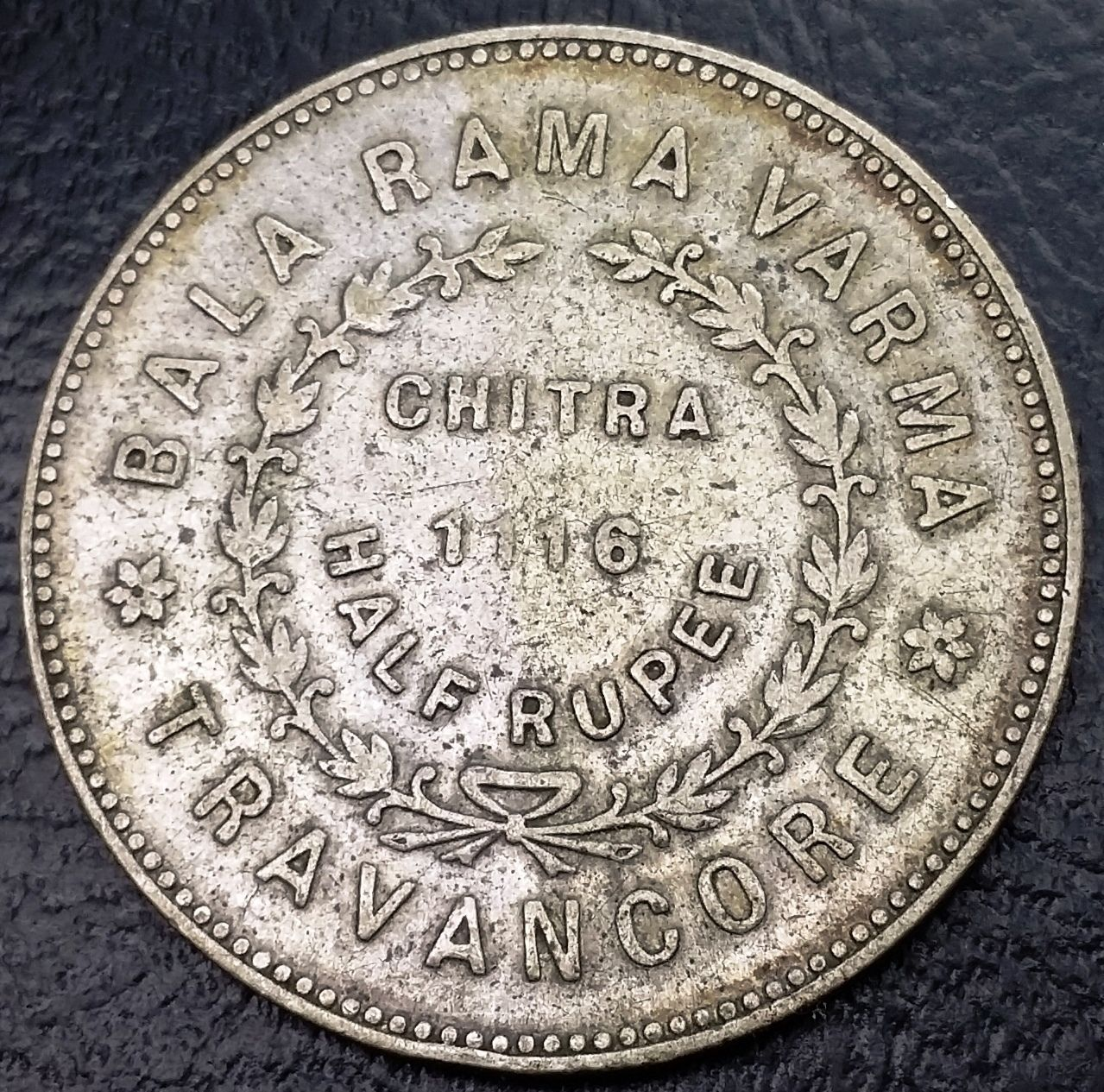
Travancore Half Rupee - Front

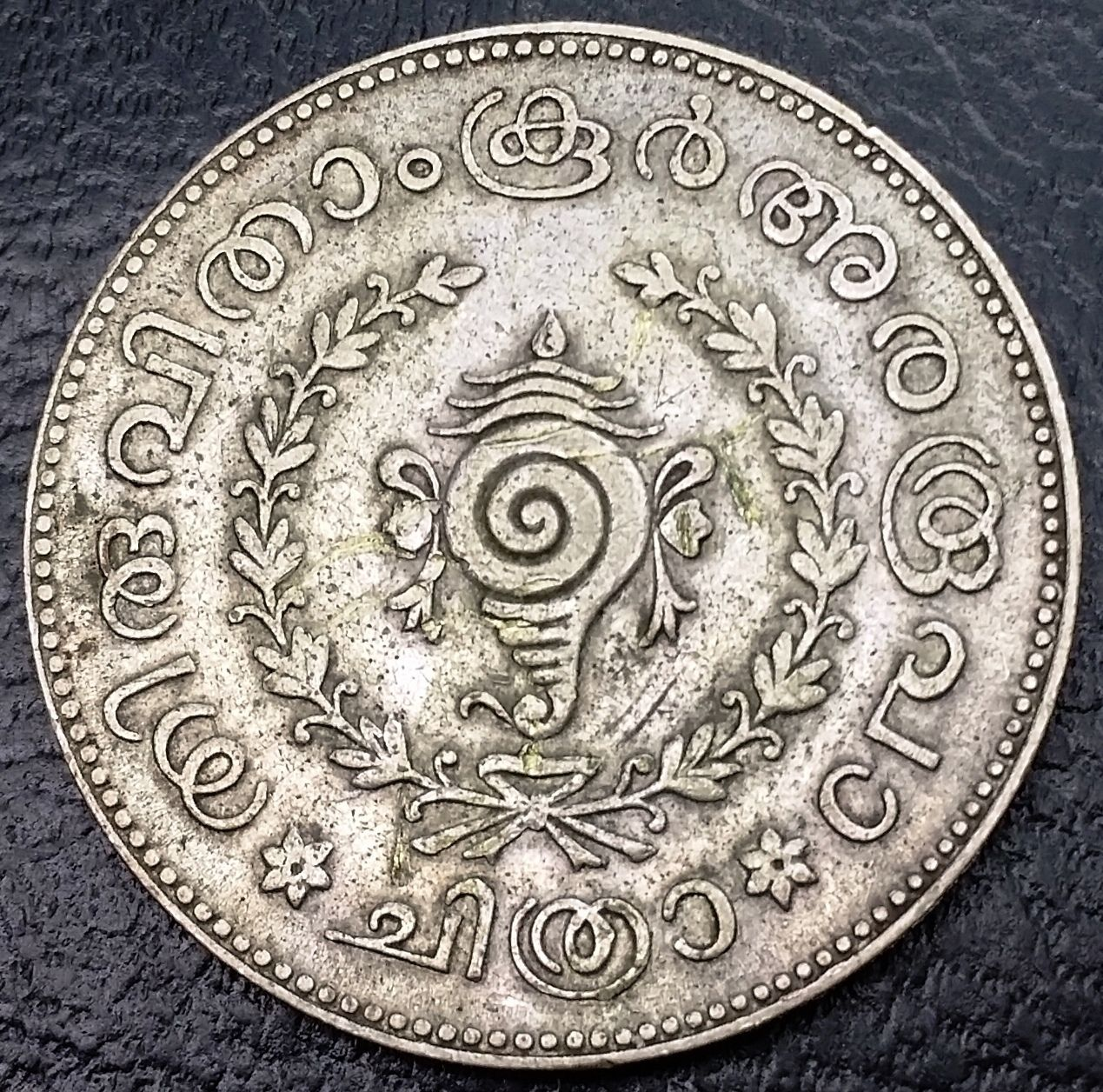
Travancore Half Rupee - Reverse

The Travancore Rupee was the highest denomination of currency issued for general circulation. The highest face value issued was the '1/2 rupee'. While there had been plans to introduce 'One Travancore Rupee', this was never done. The half-rupee and the quarter-rupee remained the highest values issued for circulation. The Travancore Rupee was issued until the year 1946 remaining in circulation until 1949. It was replaced by the Indian rupee following Travancore's accession into India.

== Inscriptions ==
Issues of the Travancore Rupee often had the names or insignia of the reigning monarch in English. The reverse features inscriptions in the native language of Malayalam as well as the royal insignia of Travancore. The inscriptions are largely a direct translation of the front of the coin. The year, when printed on the coins was based on the Malayalam calendar (and corresponding Malayalam Era - ME) which begins circa 825 AD. Therefore, the year of issue of the coin can be found by adding 825 to it. For example, the year of issue of a coin showing 1000, will be 1825 AD. Therefore, the year of issue of the coin with the year 1116, as depicted in the images, will be 1940-41.

Unlike the Rupee issued by the British and other princely States of India, the Travancore Rupee was subdivided into 7 Travancore Fanams. These Fanams were further sub-divided into 4 Chakrams, each of 16 Cash. We can see these sub-divisions in the following table -

Unit	Equivalent Sub-units
1 Travancore Rupee	7 Fanams
1 Fanam	4 Chuckrams
1 Chuckram	16 Cash

As of the early 1900s, silver coins were issued in the denominations of Rupee and Chakrams. Their various values included 2 chakrams, 4 chakrams, 1/4 rupee (7 chakrams) and 1/2 rupee (14 chakrams). The cash or kashu coins were largely copper coins. They were struck in values of 1 cash, 4 cash and 8 cash. The exchange rate with the British Indian rupee was set at 1 British Indian rupee = 28 chakram, 8 cash; equivalently, 1 Tranvancore rupee = 15 annas, 8.63 pies of a British Indian rupee.

== See also ==
- Travancore
- Travancore Fanam
- Indian rupee
