= Gheevarghese Severios =

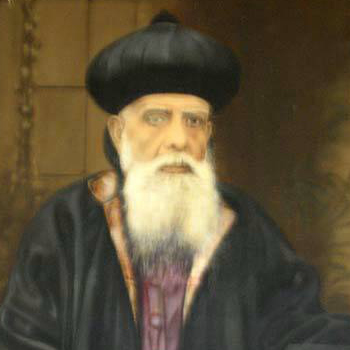
- Born: 1851; Travancore
- Died: 11 June 1927 (aged 75–76); Kottayam, Travancore

Gheevarghese Severios (27 March 1851 – 11 June 1927) was a Metropolitan bishop for the Malankara Syriac Knanaya Archdiocese, created for the Knanaya community. He was born in Travancore, now in the state of Kerala in India, to Kasiso and Kunjachi Philippose Edavazhickal.
