= Cochin–Travancore Alliance (1761) =

Cochin-Travancore Alliance
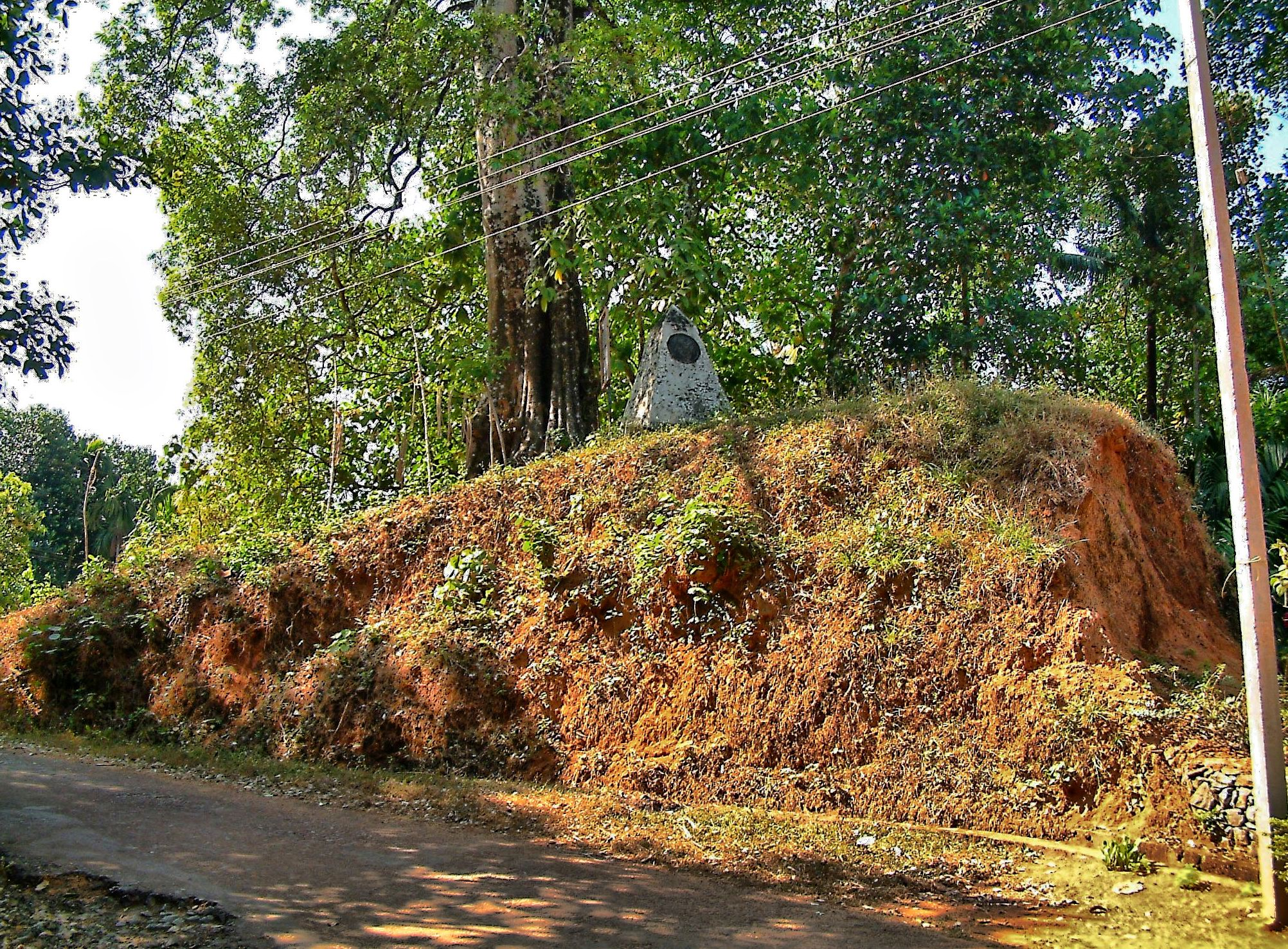
- The ruins of the entrance of the Travancore Defense Lines at Palamuri, Chalakkudi
- Type: Peace treaty
- Context: Common enemy in the Zamorin of Calicut
- Signed: 22-23, December 1761
- Provisional application: Travancore helps liberate occupied Cochin territory
- Parties: 2
- Ratifiers: Kingdom of Cochin; Kingdom of Travancore

The Cochin–Travancore Alliance was an alliance between the Kingdom of Cochin and the Kingdom of Travancore established in 1761 that had the goal of expelling the forces of the Zamorin of Calicut from regions of Cochin they had occupied the decade before. The alliance stipulated that the king of Travancore would help to liberate the occupied Cochinese territories in exchange for being allowed to retain the areas of Cochin they had annexed in 1755 and 1756.

== Results ==
As a result of the agreement and because of Travancore's obligation to defend Cochinese territory, the well-known Travancore Defence Lines were constructed.

The allied forces of Travancore and Cochin quickly defeated the Zamorin's army at Cranganore, Parur, and Verappalli, which expanded Travancore's influence from Cape Comorin to Cranganore, while simultaneously diminishing the territory of Cochin and placing them in a precarious situation.

During these engagements, the forces of Travancore were led by Eustachius De Lannoy, the Flemish commander associated with the Battle of Colachel.

== Aftermath and Dissolving ==
After the Dutch in the area withdrew their support from the weakened Cochin, Travancore turned on the kingdom, and both Calicut and Travancore forces marched to Cochin. The Calicut forces invaded from the north and quickly occupied several strongholds while the Travancore invaded from the south. Under pressure from the two neighboring powers and lacking support, Cochin soon sued for another peace treaty with Travancore.
