= Travancore =

Kingdom in southern India from 1729 to 1949

Coordinates: 8°26′N 76°55′E

Kingdom of Travancore തിരുവിതാംകൂർ
- 1729–1949
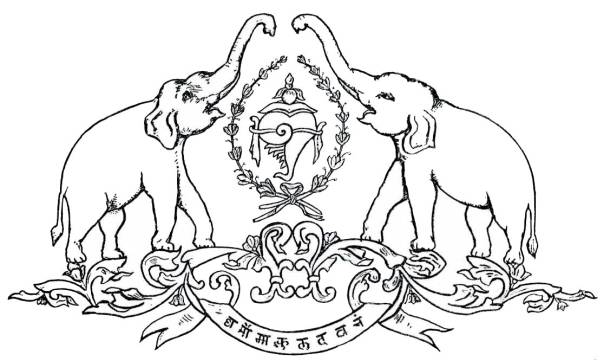
- Flag Coat of arms
- Motto: ധർമോസ്മത്ത് കുലദൈവതം Dharmōsmat Kuladaivatam (English: "Charity is our household divinity")
- Anthem: വഞ്ചീശ മംഗളം Vancheesha Mangalam (1937–1949) (English:"Hail the Lord of Vanchi")
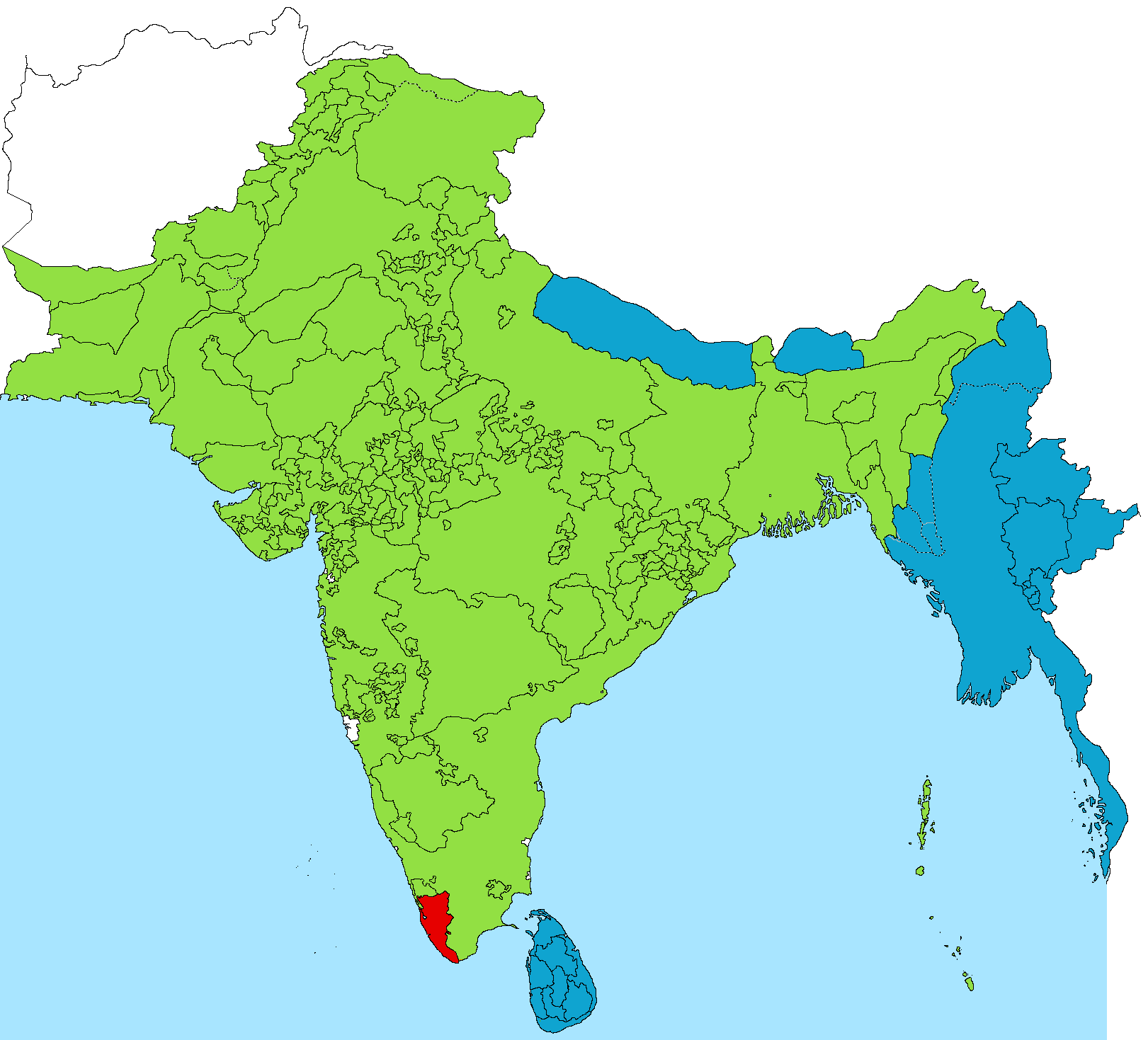
- Location of the kingdom of Travancore (red) in 1940's British India (green)
- Official languages: English, Malayalam
- Recognized regional languages: Tamil (in Southern Division)
- Religion: Majority: Hinduism (official); Minority: Chiefly Christianity and Islam; Small communities of Jews, Jains, Sikhs, Buddhists, and Zoroastrians
- Government: Monarchy
- Maharaja
  - 1729–1758 (first): Marthanda Varma
  - 1829–1846 (peak): Swathi Thirunal
  - 1931–1949 (last): Chithira Thirunal
- Diwan
  - 1729–1736: Arumukan Pillai
  - 1838–1839 (peak): R. Venkata Rao
  - 1947–1949 (last): P. G. N. Unnithan
- Historical era: Age of Imperialism
  - Established: 1729
  - Subsidiary alliance with the East India Company: 1795
  - Vassal of India: 1947
  - Merger with kingdom of Cochin: 1 July 1949
  - Disestablished: 1949

Area
- 1941: 19,844 km^{2} (7,662 sq mi)

Population
  - 1941: 6,070,018
- Currency: Travancore Rupee
Preceded by	Succeeded by
Venad	Travancore–Cochin
- Today part of: India

The Kingdom of Travancore (/ˈtrævəŋkɔːr/), also known as the Thiruvithamkoor Kingdom (Malayalam: [t̪iɾuʋid̪aːŋɡuːr]) and Travancore State, was a princely state in the Indian subcontinent that lasted from c. 1729 until 1949. It was ruled by the Travancore royal family from Padmanabhapuram, and later Thiruvananthapuram. At its zenith, the kingdom covered most of the south of modern-day Kerala (Idukki, Kottayam, Alappuzha, Pathanamthitta, Kollam, and Thiruvananthapuram districts, major portions of Ernakulam district, Puthenchira village of Thrissur district) and the southernmost part of modern-day Tamil Nadu (Kanyakumari district and some parts of Tenkasi district) with the Thachudaya Kaimal's enclave of Irinjalakuda Koodalmanikyam temple in the neighbouring kingdom of Cochin. However, the Tangasseri area of Kollam City and Anchuthengu near Attingal in Thiruvananthapuram were parts of British India.

Geographically, Malabar District of Madras Presidency was to the north, the Madurai and Tirunelveli districts of Pandya Nadu region in Madras Presidency to the east, and the Indian Ocean to the south, and the Arabian Sea to the west.

Travancore was divided into five divisions: Padmanabhapuram, Thiruvananthapuram, Quilon, Kottayam, and Devikulam. Padmanabhapuram and Devikulam divisions were predominantly Tamil-speaking regions with small Malayalam-speaking minorities. Thiruvananthapuram, Kollam, and Kottayam divisions were predominantly Malayalam-speaking regions with small Tamil-speaking minorities.

King Marthanda Varma inherited the small feudal state of Venad in 1723, and built it into Travancore. Marthanda Varma led the Travancorean forces during the Travancore–Dutch War of 1739–46, which culminated in the Battle of Colachel. The defeat of the Dutch by Travancore is considered the earliest example of an organised power from Asia overcoming European military technology and tactics. Marthanda Varma went on to conquer most of the smaller principalities of the native rulers.

The Travancore royal family signed a treaty with the British in 1788, thereby accepting British dominance. Later, in 1805, they revised the treaty, leading to a diminution of royal authority and the loss of political independence for Travancore. They had to give up their ruling rights over the common people in 1949 when Travancore was forced to merge with independent India.

== Etymology ==
The kingdom takes its name from Thiruvithamcode in the present-day Kanyakumari district of Tamil Nadu.

The region had many small independent kingdoms. Later, at the peak of the Chera–Chola–Pandya rule, this region became part of the Chera Kingdom (except for the Ay kingdom, which always remained independent). When the region was part of the Chera empire, it was still known as Thiruvazhumkode. It was contracted to Thiruvankode, and anglicised by the English to Travancore.

In the course of time, the Ay clan, part of the Chera empire, which ruled the Thiruvazhumkode area, became an independent kingdom, and the land was called Aayi Desam or Aayi Rajyam, meaning 'Aayi territory'. The Aayis controlled the land from the present-day Kollam district in the north, through Thiruvananthapuram district to Kanyakumari district in the south. There were two capitals, the major one at Kollam (Venad Swaroopam or Desinganadu) and a subsidiary one at Thrippapur (Thrippapur Swaroopam or Nanjinad). The kingdom was thus also called Venad. Kings of Venad had built residential palaces in Thiruvithamcode and Kalkulam. Thiruvithamcode became the capital of the Thrippapur Swaroopam, and the country was referred to as Thiruvithamcode by Europeans even after the capital had been moved in 1601 to Padmanabhapuram, near Kalkulam.

The Chera empire had dissolved by around 1100 and thereafter the territory comprised numerous small kingdoms until the time of Marthanda Varma who, as king of Venad from 1729, employed brutal methods to unify them. During his reign, Thiruvithamkoor (anglicised as Travancore) became the official name.

== Geography ==
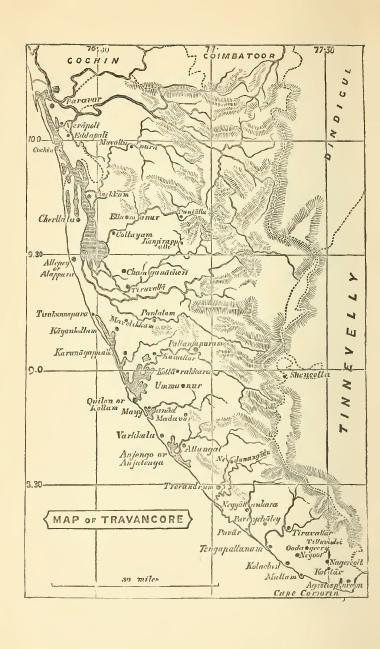
Map of Travancore in 1871

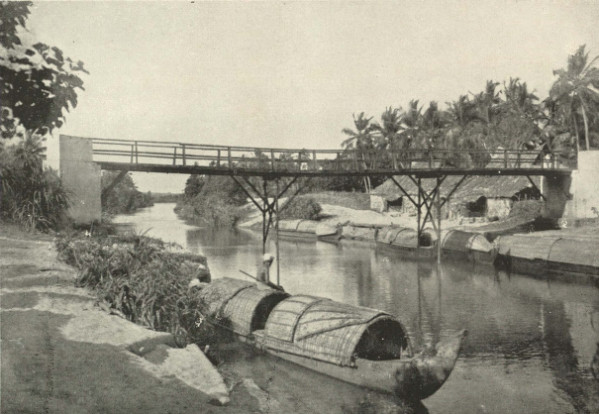
Historic scene of canal in Travancore

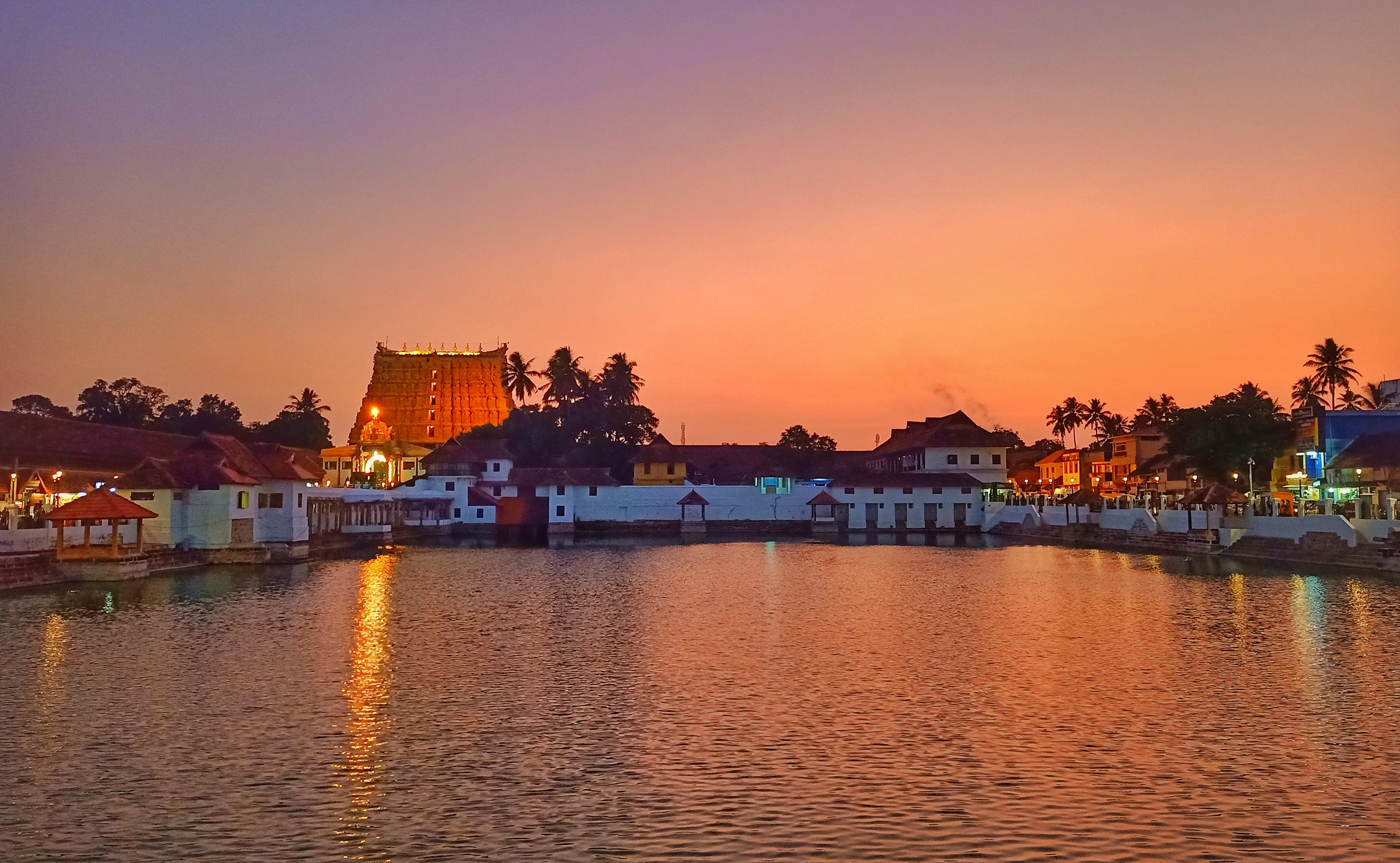
Anantha Padmanabhaswamy was the national deity of the kingdom of Travancore.

The kingdom of Travancore was located at the extreme southern tip of the Indian subcontinent. Geographically, Travancore was divided into three climatically distinct regions: the eastern highlands (rugged and cool mountainous terrain), the central midlands (rolling hills), and the western lowlands (coastal plains).

== History ==
Due to the geographical isolation of the Malabar Coast from the rest of the Indian peninsula, attributed to the presence of the Western Ghats mountain ranges lying parallel to the coast, the population and language spoken in Kerala differed from those in neighboring states such as Tamil Nadu and Karnataka.

According to the religious text "Keralolpathi" by the Nambudhiri Brahmins, the region from Gokarna to Kanyakumari district was created when Parashurama threw his axe and claimed this land, known as Parashuramakshetra.

=== Medieval Kerala ===
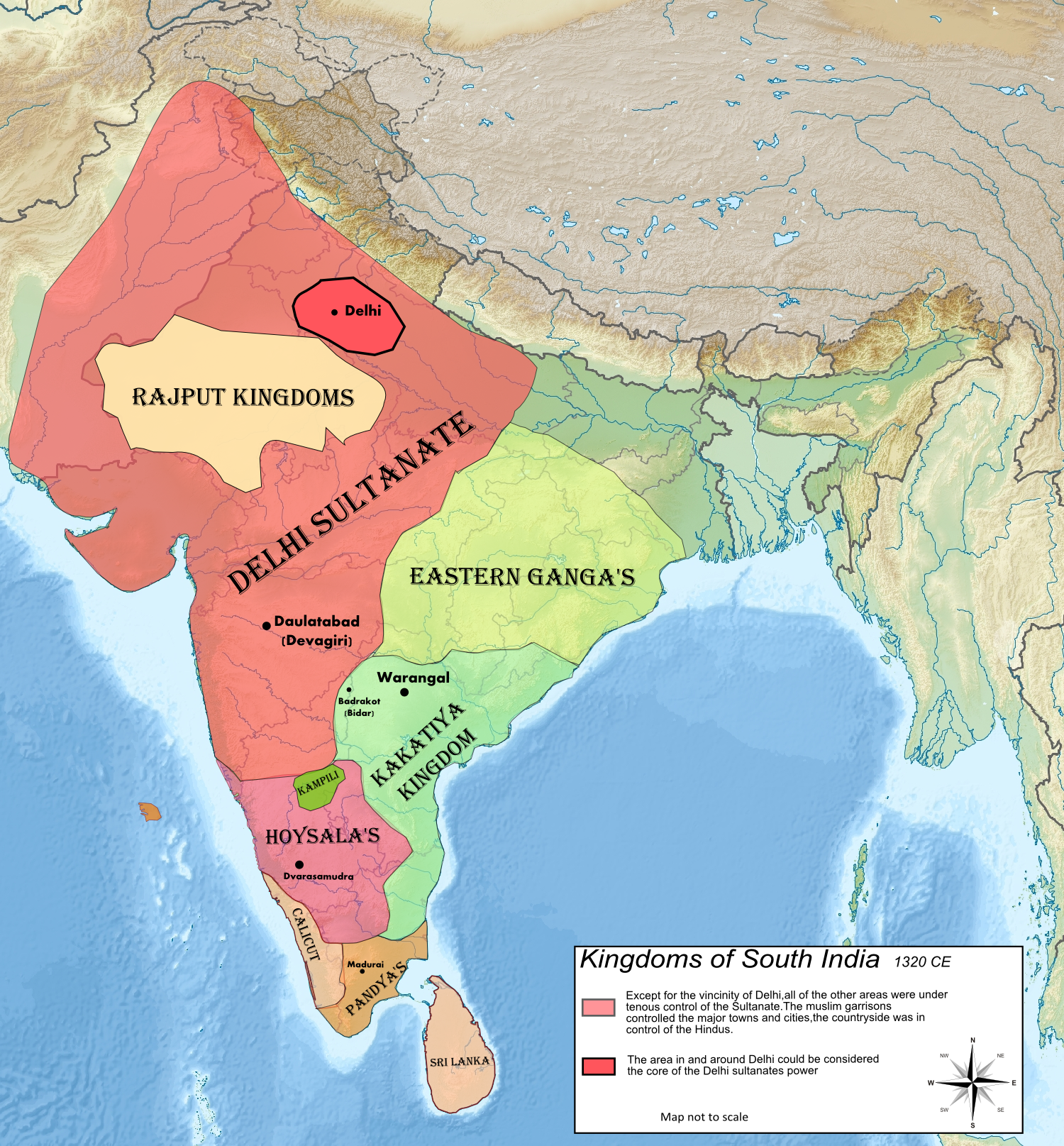
India in 1320 CE. The Kollam–Thiruvananthapuram–Kanyakumari area, located at the southernmost tip of the Indian subcontinent was the main seat of the Ay dynasty and was under the influence of the Pandya dynasty.

The Chera dynasty governed the Malabar Coast between Alappuzha in the south and Kasaragod in the north. The region around Coimbatore was ruled by the Cheras during the Sangam period roughly between the first and the fourth centuries CE and served as the eastern entrance to the Palakkad Gap, the principal trade route between the Malabar Coast and Tamil Nadu. However the southern region of the present-day Kerala state was under the Ay dynasty. During the Ay dynasty, they spoke a language known as Middle Tamil. When the Ay dynasty was conquered and succeeded by the Kulashekara Perumals, based in Kollam (later known as Venad), during the period of the Chera Kulashekara Perumal (Keralaputras) dynasty, the language evolved into Old Malayalam. The Quilon copper plates (849/850 CE) are considered the oldest available inscription written in Old Malayalam. Later, the northern districts of Thiruvananthapuram, Kollam, Alapuzha, and Pathanamthitta became proper Malayalam-speaking populations in Kerala, while the other districts showed influences from Arabic, Tamil and Kannada languages. During the period of Pattom Thanu Pillai, Travancore was referred to as Malayalam state or the land of proper Malayalis.

=== Venad Swaroopam ===
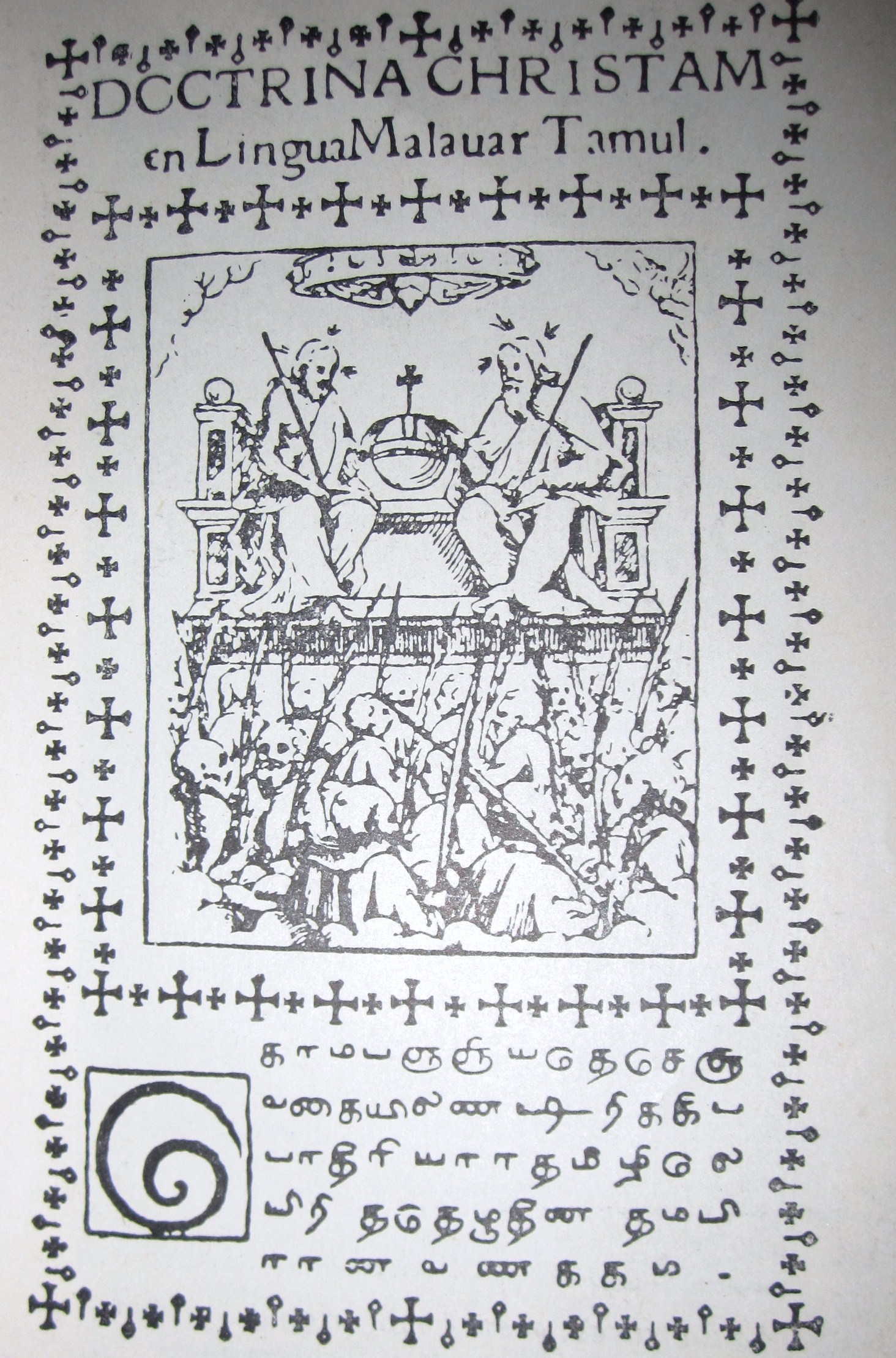
Thambiran Vanakkam was printed at Kollam, the capital of Venad in 1578, during the Portuguese Era. It is the first book printed in any Indian language. It was written in the language Lingua Malabar Tamul, which was spoken in southern Kerala (Kollam–Thiruvananthapuram–Kanyakumari area) during the medieval period.

Located at the tip of the Indian subcontinent, the former state of Venad was traditionally ruled by rajas known as the Venattadis. Until the end of the 11th century AD, it was a small principality in the Ay Kingdom. The Ays were the earliest ruling dynasty in southern Kerala, who, at their zenith, ruled over a region from Nagercoil in the south to Thiruvananthapuram in the north. Their capital during the first Sangam age was in Aykudi and later, towards the end of the eighth century AD, at Quilon (Kollam). Though a series of attacks by the resurgent Pandyas between the seventh and eighth centuries caused the decline of the Ays, the dynasty was powerful until the beginning of the tenth century. Sulaiman al-Tajir, a Persian merchant who visited Kerala during the reign of Sthanu Ravi Varma (9th century CE), recorded the existence of extensive trade between Kerala and China, based at the port of Kollam.

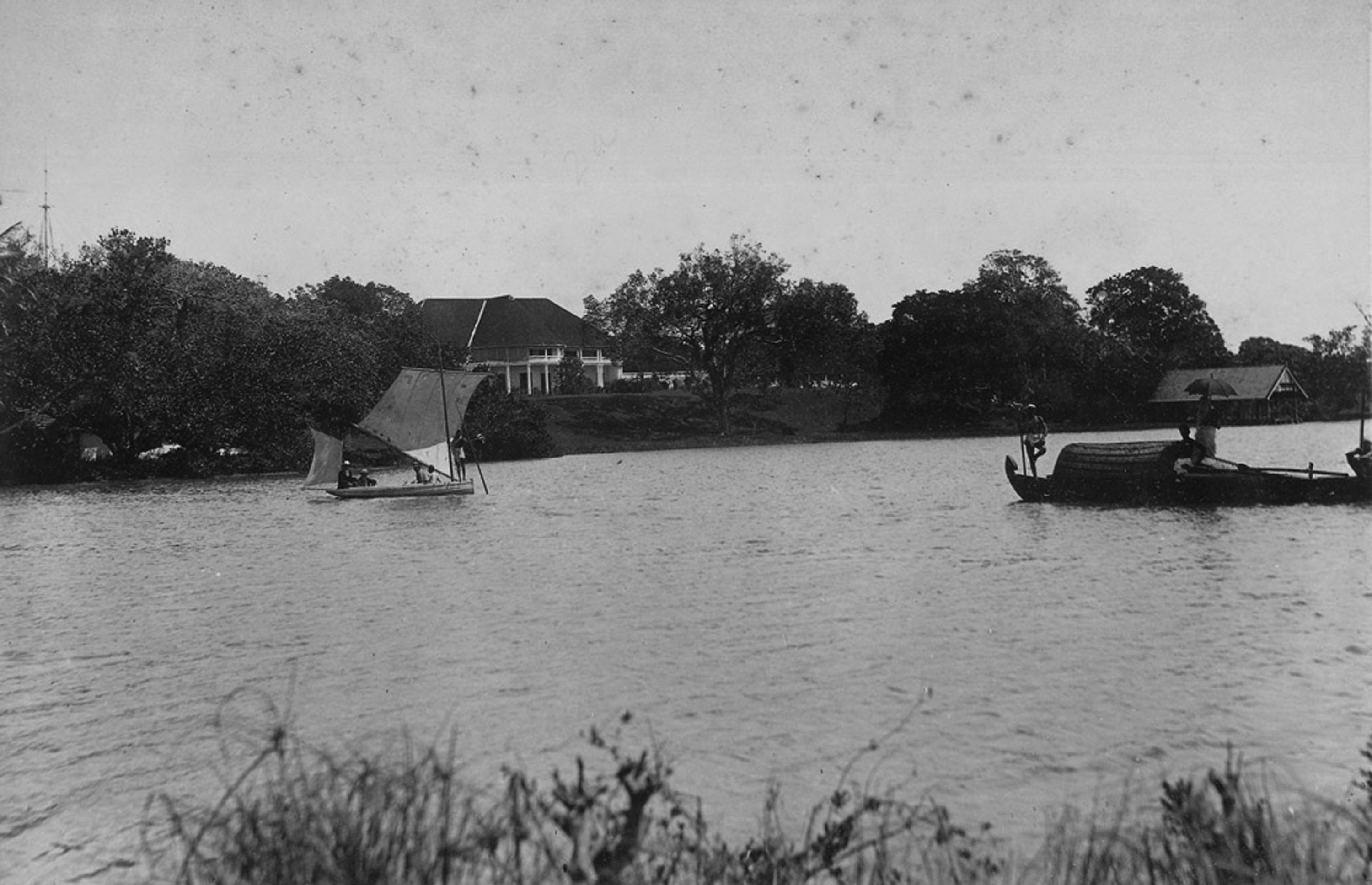
The British Residency in Quilon, where the resident of Travancore resided

When the Ay diminished, Venad became the southernmost principality of the Second Chera Kingdom. An invasion of the Cholas into Venad caused the destruction of Kollam in 1096. However, the Chera capital, Mahodayapuram, also fell in the subsequent Chola attack, which compelled the Chera king, Rama Varma Kulasekara, to shift his capital to Kollam. Thus, Rama Varma Kulasekara, the last emperor of the Chera dynasty, was probably the founder of the Venad royal house, and the title of the Chera kings, Kulasekara, was thenceforth kept by the rulers of Venad. Thus the end of the Second Chera dynasty in the 12th century marks the independence of Venad.

In the second half of the 12th century, two branches of the Ay dynasty, the Thrippappur and Chirava, merged in the Venad family, which set up the tradition of designating the ruler of Venad as Chirava Moopan and the heir-apparent as Thrippappur Moopan. While the Chrirava Moopan had his residence at Kollam, the Thrippappur Moopan resided at his palace in Thrippappur, nine miles north of Thiruvananthapuram, and was vested with authority over the temples of Venad kingdom, especially the Sri Padmanabhaswamy temple.

=== Formation and development of Travancore ===
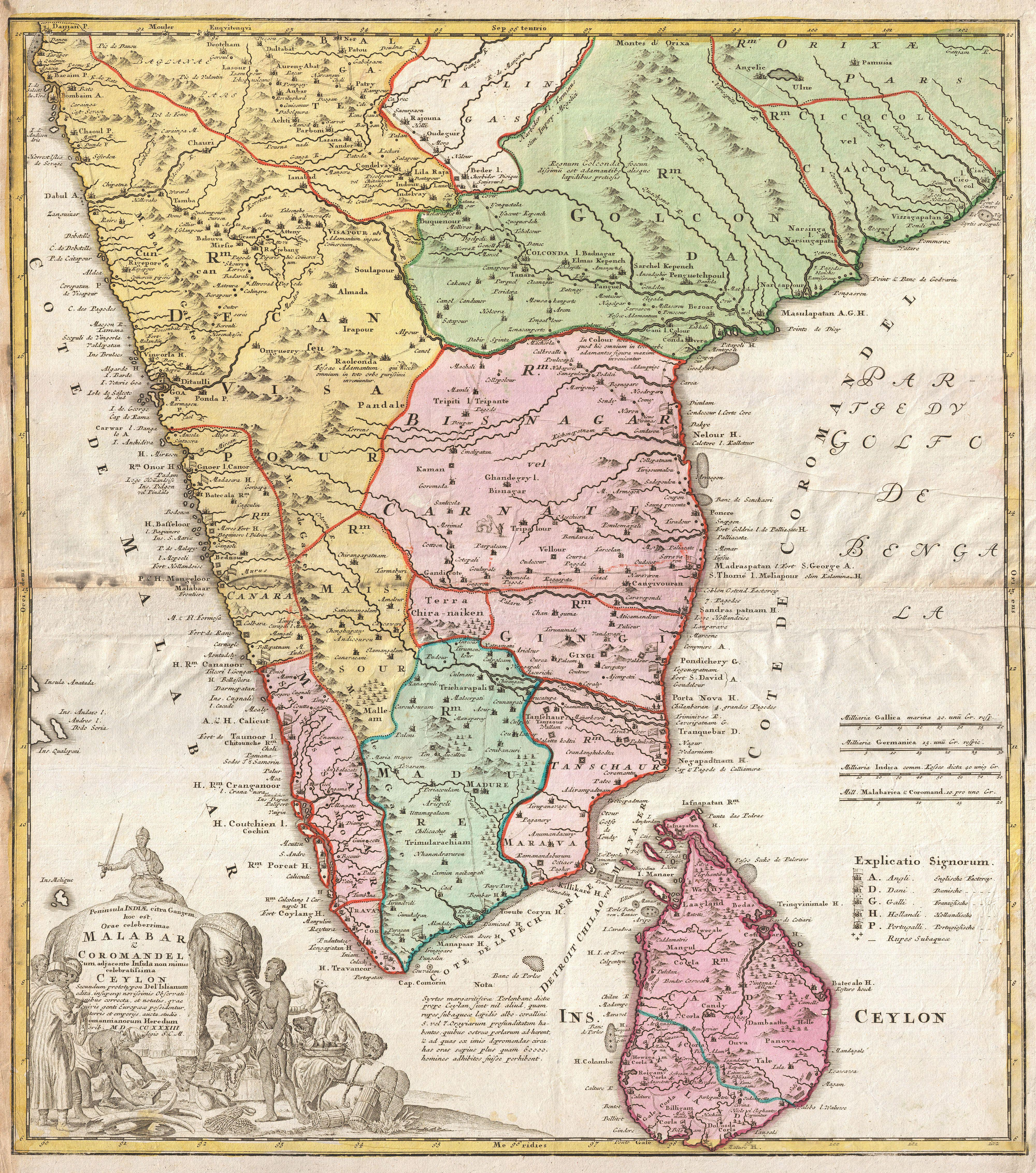
A map of the Malabar Coast in 1733. At that time, Travancore was only a small territory wedged between Kollam and Kanyakumari, as shown in the map (Present-day districts of Thiruvananthapuram district and Kanyakumari only). The vast region of the Malabar Coast between Kannur and Kollam was under the control of the Zamorin of Calicut then. In the latter half of the 18th century Travancore inherited the kingdoms as far as Cochin and became a powerful kingdom.

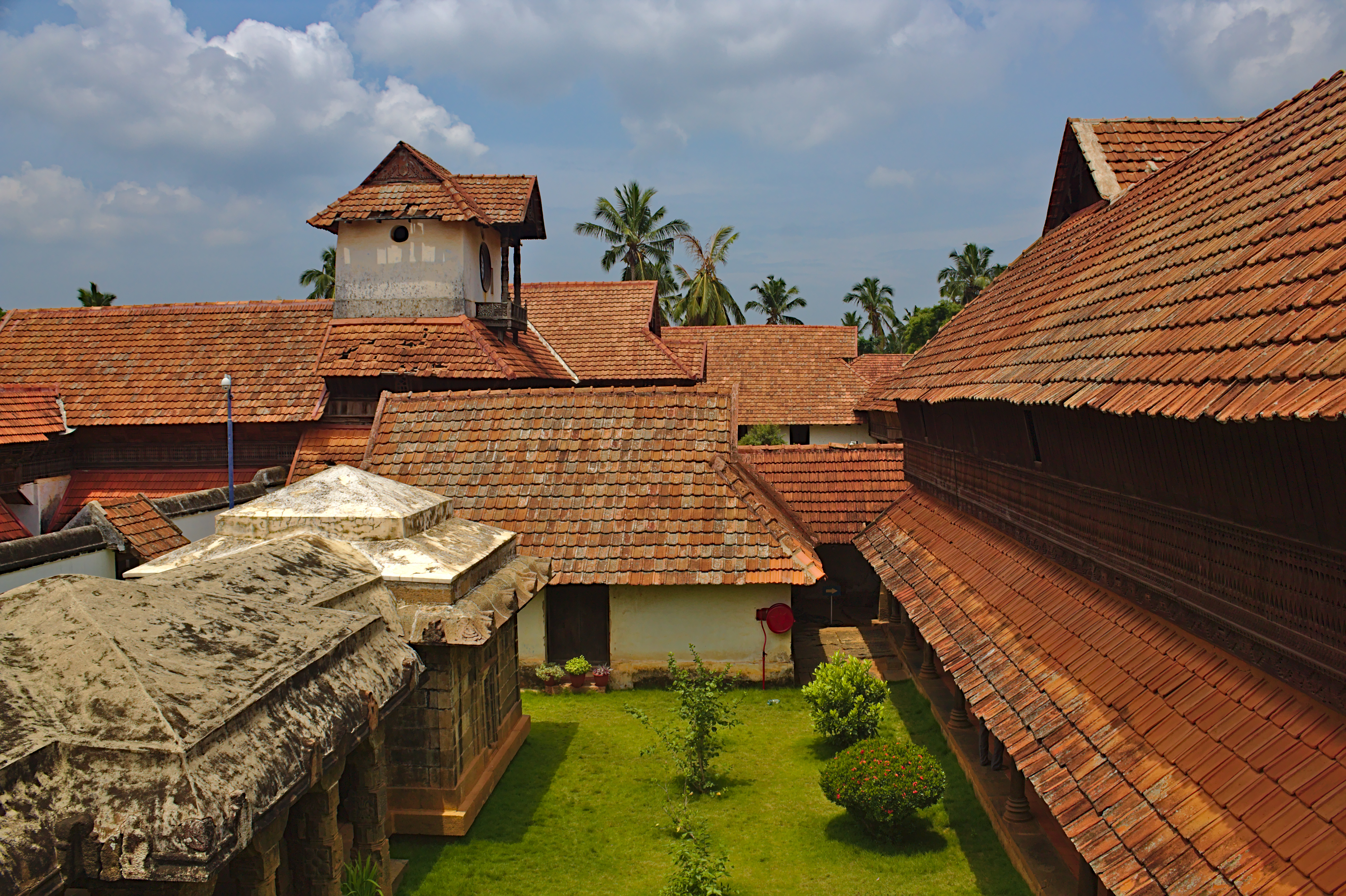
Padmanabhapuram Palace

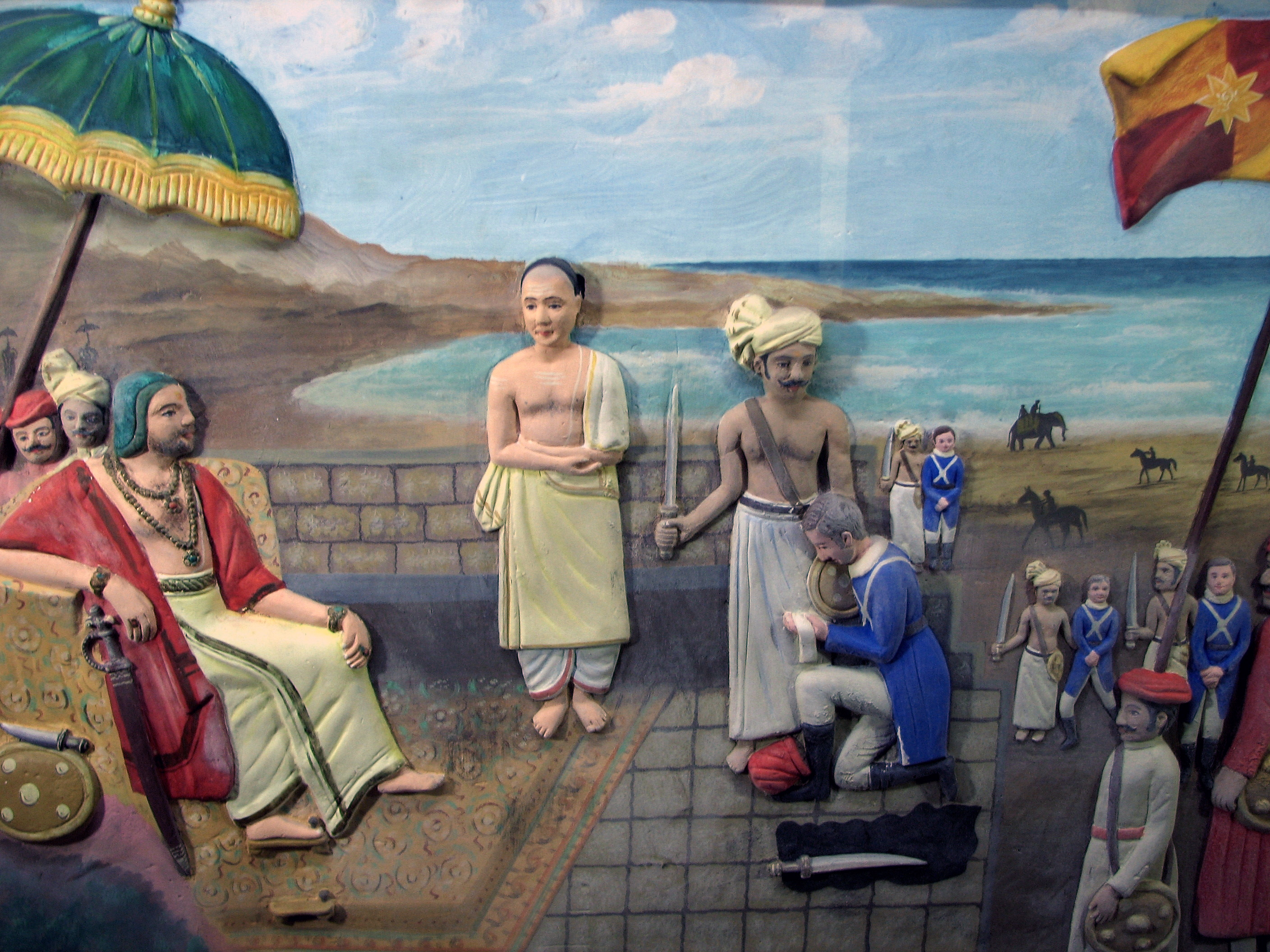
Eustachius De Lannoy of the Dutch East India Company surrenders to Marthanda Varma of the kingdom of Travancore after the Battle of Colachel. Depiction at Padmanabhapuram Palace.

In the early 18th century CE, the Travancore royal family adopted some members from the royal family of Kolathunadu based at Kannur, and Parappanad in present-day Malappuram district. The history of Travancore began with Marthanda Varma, who inherited the kingdom of Venad (Thrippappur), and expanded it into Travancore during his reign (1729–1758). After defeating a union of feudal lords and establishing internal peace, he expanded the kingdom of Venad through a series of military campaigns from Kanyakumari in the south to the borders of Kochi in the north during his 29-year rule.

During his rule occurred the Travancore–Dutch War (1739–1753) between Travancore and the Dutch East India Company, which had been allied to some of these kingdoms. In 1741, Travancore won the Battle of Colachel against the Dutch, resulting in the complete eclipse of Dutch power in the region. In this battle Travancore forces captured the Dutch Captain, Eustachius De Lannoy; he later defected to Travancore. De Lannoy was appointed captain of His Highness' bodyguard and later Senior Admiral ("Valiya kappittan") and modernised the Travancore army by introducing firearms and artillery. From 1741 to 1758, De Lannoy remained in command of the Travancore forces and was involved in annexation of small principalities.

Travancore became the most dominant state in the Kerala region by defeating the powerful Zamorin of Kozhikode in the battle of Purakkad in 1755. Ramayyan Dalawa, the prime minister (1737–1756) of Marthanda Varma, also played an important role in this consolidation and expansion.

On 3 January 1750, (5 Makaram, 925 Kollavarsham), Marthanda Varma virtually "dedicated" Travancore to his tutelary deity Padmanabha, one of the aspects of the Hindu God Vishnu with a lotus issuing from his navel on which Brahma sits. From then on the rulers of Travancore ruled as the "servants of Padmanabha" (the Padmnabha-dasar).

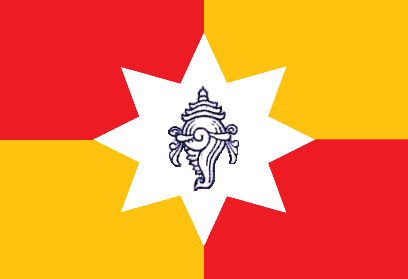
Early flag used by Marthanda Varma

At the Battle of Ambalapuzha, Marthanda Varma defeated the union of the deposed kings and the king of the Cochin kingdom.

=== Mysore invasion ===
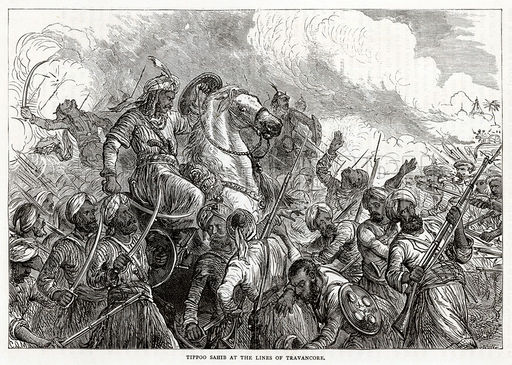
Tipu Sultan at the lines of Travancore. Illustration from Cassell's Illustrated History of India by James Grant (c. 1896).

Marthanda Varma's successor Karthika Thirunal Rama Varma (1758–1798), who was popularly known as Dharma Raja, shifted the capital in 1795 from Padmanabhapuram to Thiruvananthapuram. Dharma Raja's period is considered a golden age in the history of Travancore. He not only retained the territorial gains of his predecessor, but also improved and encouraged social development. He was greatly assisted by a very efficient administrator, Raja Kesavadas, the Diwan of Travancore.

Travancore often allied with the English East India Company in military conflicts. During Dharma Raja's reign, Tipu Sultan, the de facto ruler of Mysore and the son of Hyder Ali, attacked Travancore in 1789 as a part of the Mysore invasion of Kerala. Dharma Raja had earlier refused to hand over the Hindu political refugees from the Mysore occupation of Malabar who had been given asylum in Travancore. The Mysore army entered the Cochin kingdom from Coimbatore in November 1789 and reached Thrissur in December. On 28 December 1789 Tipu Sultan attacked the Nedunkotta (northern lines) from the north, causing the Battle of Nedumkotta and the defeat of the Mysore army.

=== Velu Thampi Dalawa's rebellion ===
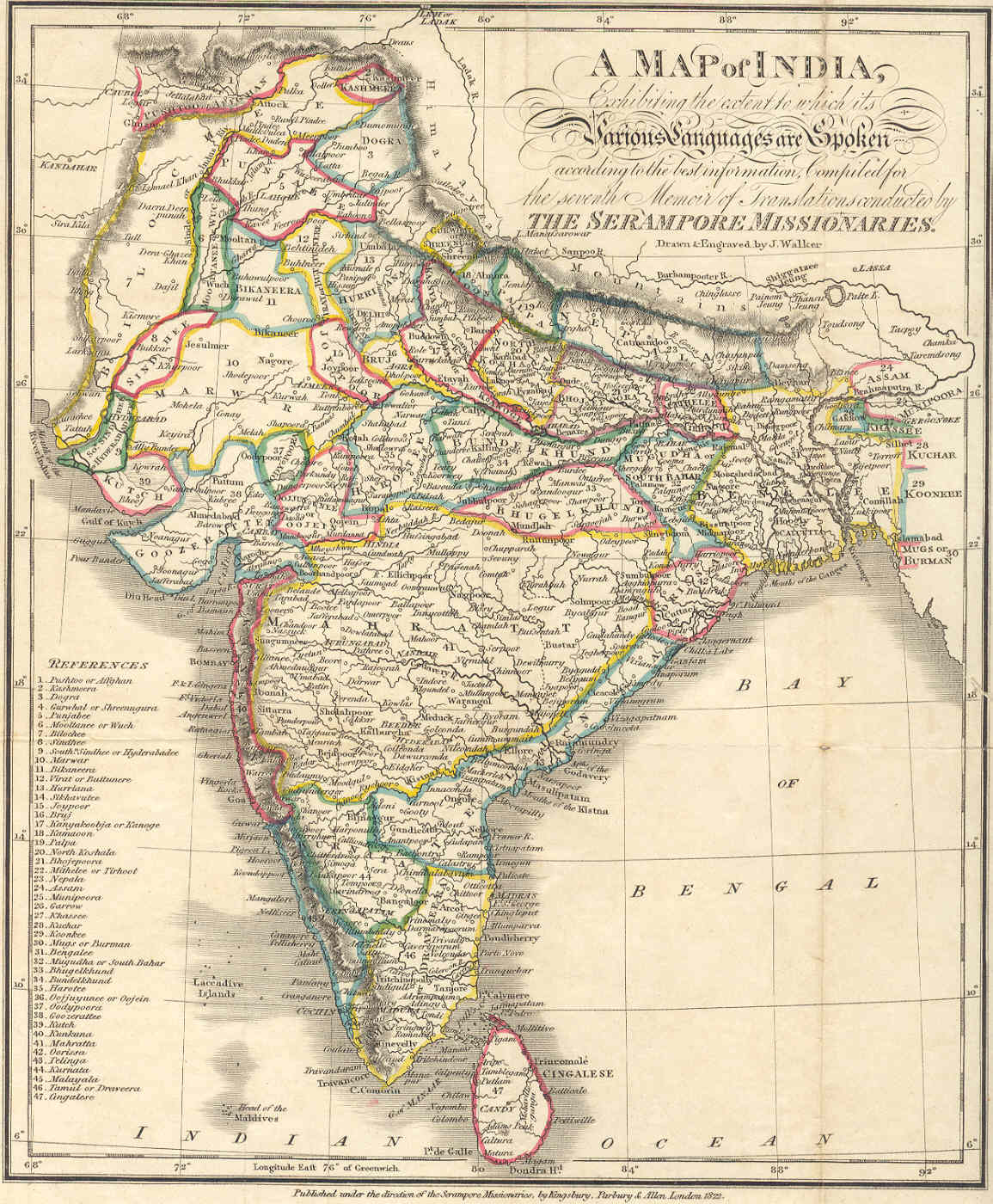
A language map of India prepared in 1822. Note that a major portion of Travancore was included in Tamil-spoken region.

On Dharma Raja's death in 1798, Balarama Varma (1798–1810), the weakest ruler of the dynasty, took over at the age of sixteen. A treaty brought Travancore under a subsidiary alliance with the English East India Company in 1795.

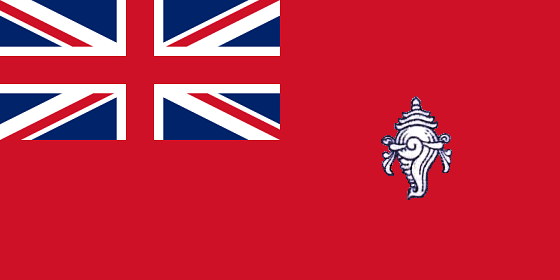
Travancore State Merchant Flag

The prime ministers (dalawas or dewans) started to take control of the kingdom beginning with Velu Thampi Dalawa (Velayudhan Chempakaraman Thampi) (1799–1809), who was appointed as the dewan following the dismissal of Jayanthan Sankaran Nampoothiri (1798–1799). Initially, Velayudhan Chempakaraman Thampi and the East India Company got along very well. When a section of the Travancore army mutinied in 1805 against Velu Thampi, he sought refuge with the British Resident Colonel (later General) Colin Macaulay and later used company troops to crush the mutiny. Velu Thampi also played a key role in negotiating a new treaty between Travancore and the East India Company. However, the company's demands for compensating payment for their involvement in the Travancore–Mysore War (1791) on behalf of Travancore led to tension between the dewan and Colonel Macaulay. Velu Thampi and the dewan of Cochin kingdom, Paliath Achan Govindan Menon, who was unhappy with Macaulay for granting asylum to his enemy Kunhi Krishna Menon, declared "war" on the East India Company.

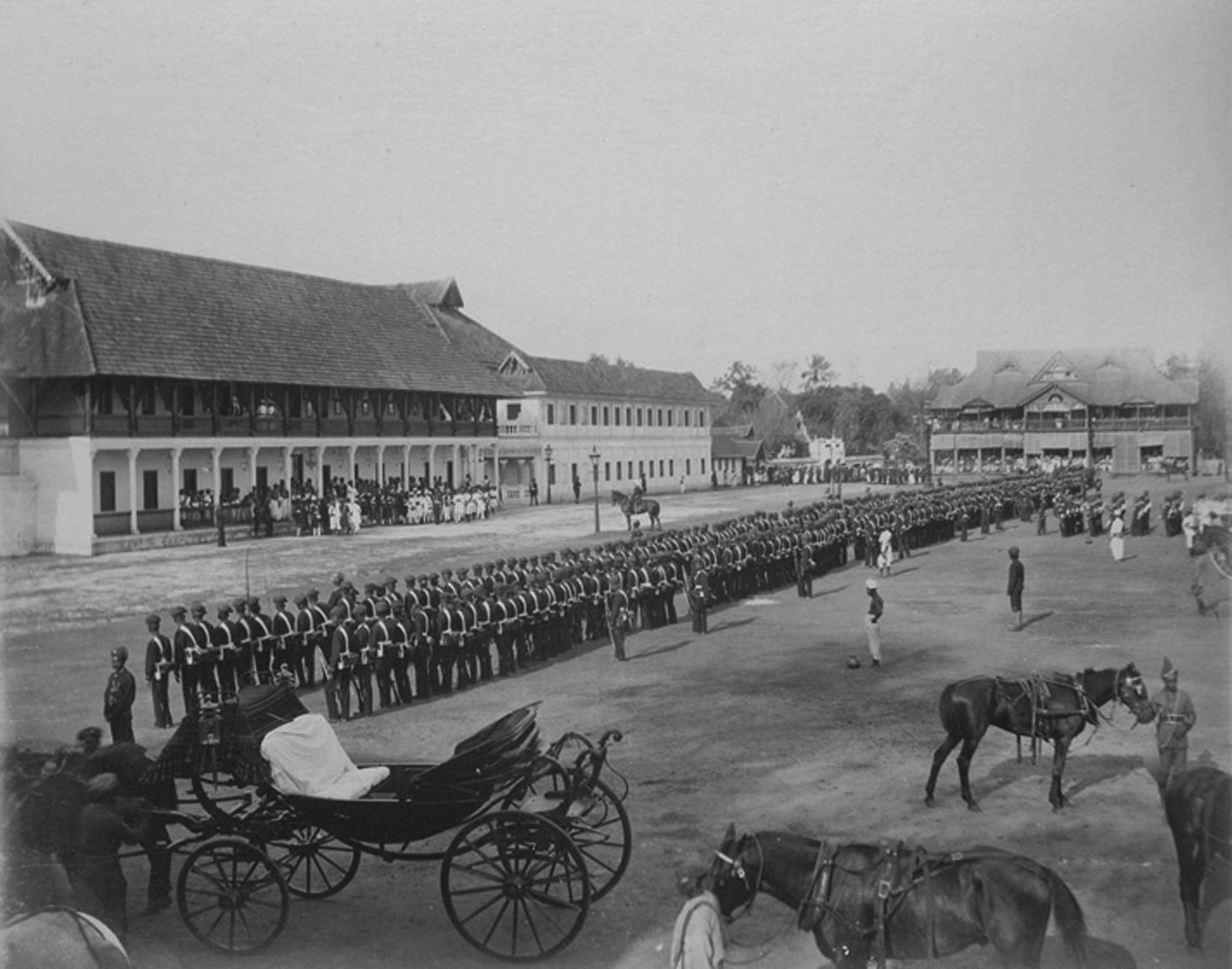
Adoption Durbar, Trivandrum

The East India Company army defeated Paliath Achan's army in Cochin on 27 February 1809. Paliath Achan surrendered to the East India Company and was exiled to Madras and later to Benaras. The company defeated forces under Velu Thampi at battles near Nagercoil and Kollam, and inflicted heavy casualties on the rebels, many of whom then deserted and returned home. The Maharajah of Travancore, who hitherto had not openly taken any part in the rebellion, now allied with the British and appointed one of Thampi's enemies as his prime minister. The allied East India Company army and the Travancore soldiers camped in Pappanamcode, just outside Thiruvananthapuram. Velu Thampi now organised a guerrilla struggle against the company, but committed suicide to avoid capture by the Travancore army. After the mutiny of 1805 against Velu Thampi, most of the Nair army battalions of Travancore were disbanded, and after Velu Thampi's uprising, almost all of the remaining Travancore forces were also disbanded, with the East India Company undertaking to serve the Rajah in cases of external and internal aggression.

=== Cessation of mahādānams ===
The Rajahs of Travancore had been conditionally promoted to Kshatriya-hood with periodic performance of 16 mahādānams (great gifts in charity) such as Hiranya-garbha, Hiranya-Kāmadhenu, and Hiranyāsvaratā, in each of which thousands of Brahmins had been given costly gifts in addition to a minimum of 1 kazhanch (78.65 gm) of gold. In 1848 the Marquess of Dalhousie, then Governor-General of India, was apprised that the depressed condition of the finances in Travancore was due to these mahādānams by the rulers. Lord Dalhousie instructed Lord Harris, Governor of the Madras Presidency, to warn the King of Travancore, Martanda Varma (Uttram Tirunal) (1847–60), that if he did not end this practice, the Madras Presidency would take over his state's administration. This led to the cessation of the practice of mahādanams.

All Travancorean kings including Sree Moolam Thirunal conducted the Hiranyagarbham and Tulapurushadaanam ceremonies. Maharaja Chithira Thirunal was the only King of Travancore not to have conducted these rituals as he considered them extremely costly.

=== 19th and early 20th centuries ===
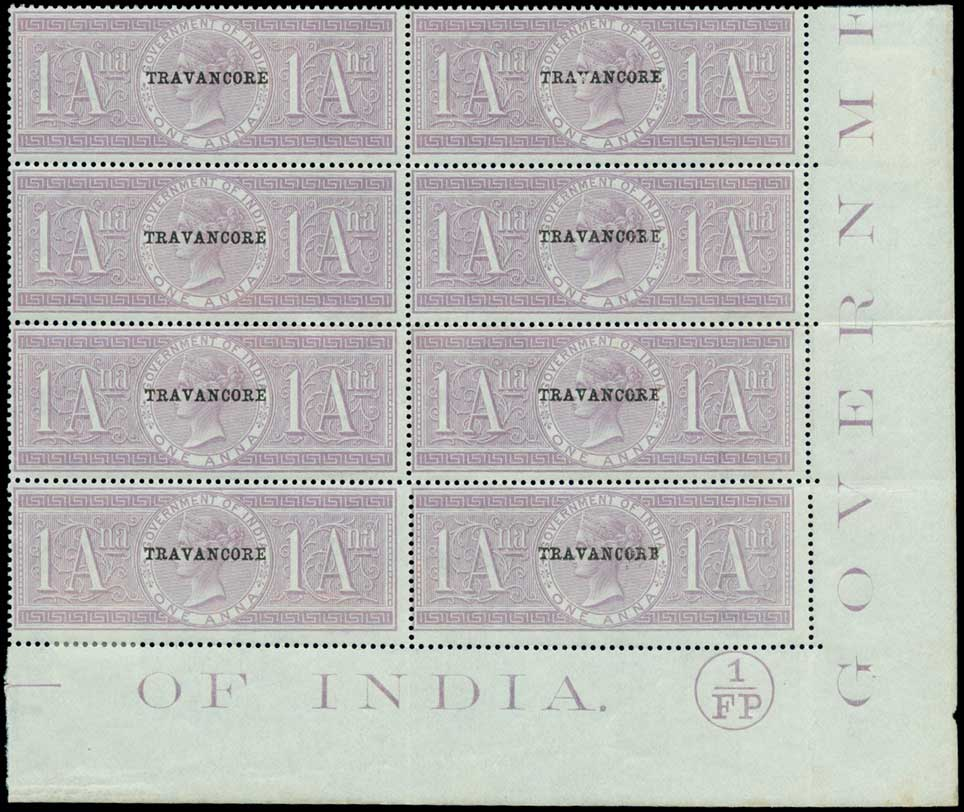
A block of 1887 Travancore revenue stamps depicting Queen Victoria

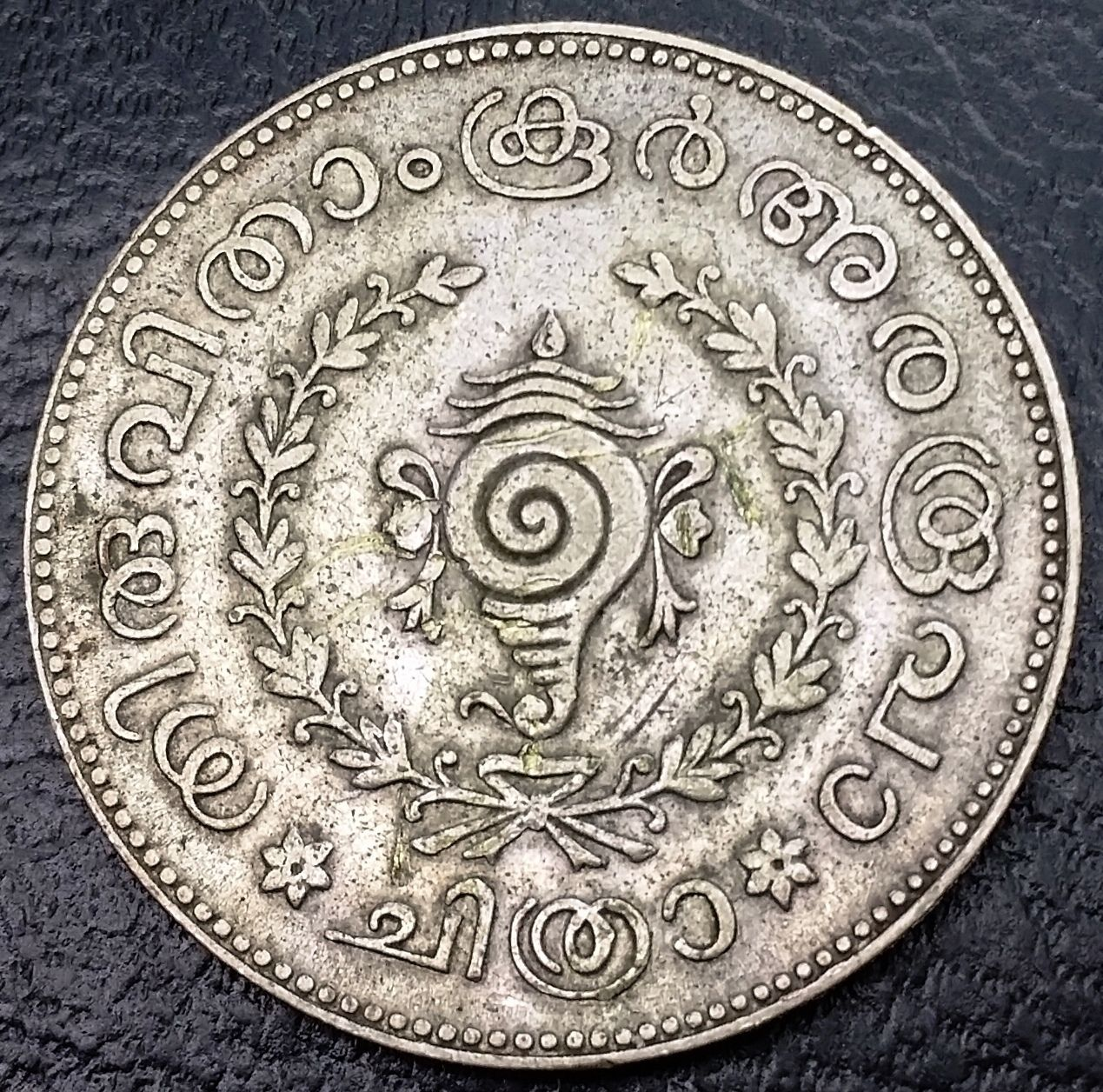
Malayalam letters on old Travancore Rupee coin

The caste system was enforced more rigorously in Travancore than in many other parts of India up to the mid-1800s. The hierarchical caste order was deeply entrenched in the social system and was supported by the government, which transformed this caste-based social system into a religious institution.

In such a context, the Ayyavazhi religious sect served also as a reform movement in uplifting the downtrodden of society, both socially and religiously. The rituals of Ayyavazhi constituted a social discourse. Its beliefs, mode of worship, and religious organisation seem to have enabled the Ayyavazhi group to negotiate, cope with, and resist the imposition of authority. The hard tone of the sect's founder, Ayya Vaikundar, was perceived as a revolution against the government. In response, King Swathi Thirunal Rama Varma initially imprisoned Vaikundar in the Singarathoppu jail, but later set him at liberty. Vaikundar's jailor, Appaguru, ended up becoming his disciple.

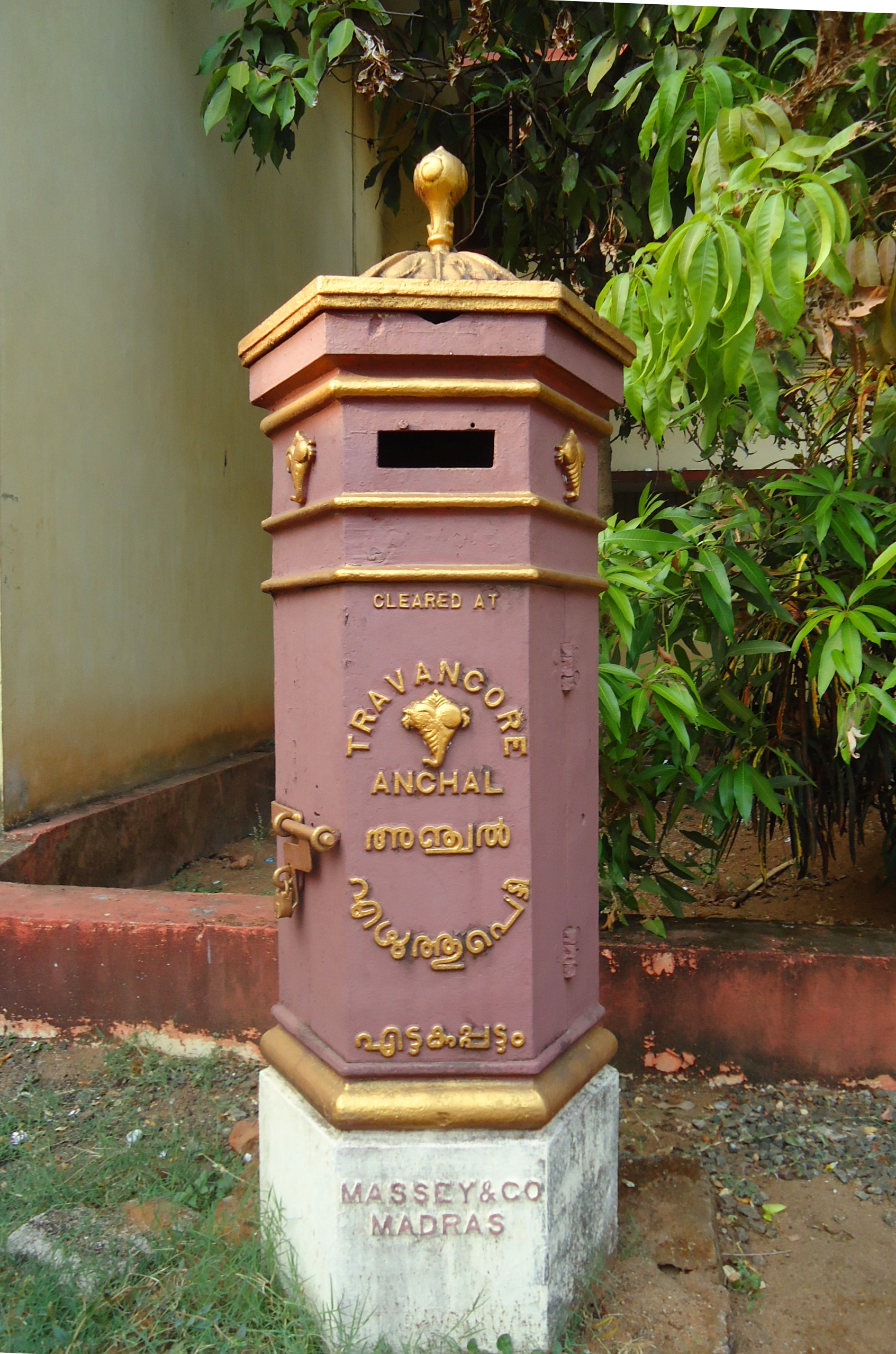
Travancore's postal service adopted a standard cast iron pillar box, made by Massey & Co in Madras, similar to the British Penfold model introduced in 1866. This Anchal post box is in Perumbavoor.

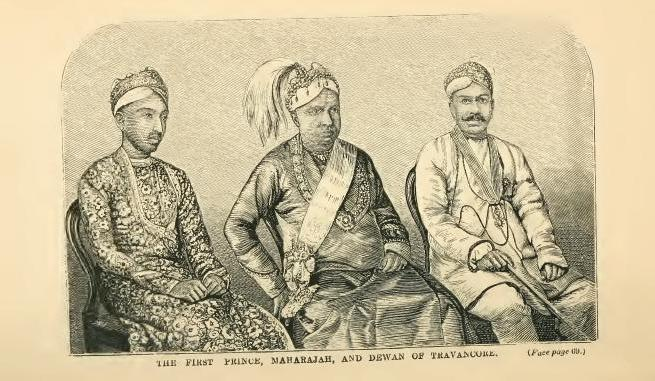
Ayilyam Thirunal of Travancore (centre) with the first prince (left) and Dewan Rajah Sir T. Madhava Rao (right)

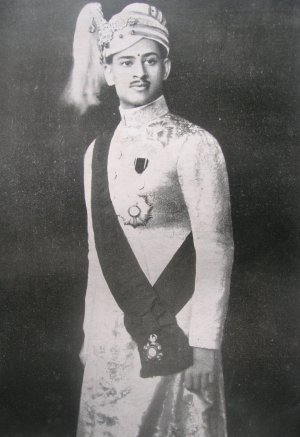
The last King of Travancore, Sree Chithira Thirunal Balarama Varma

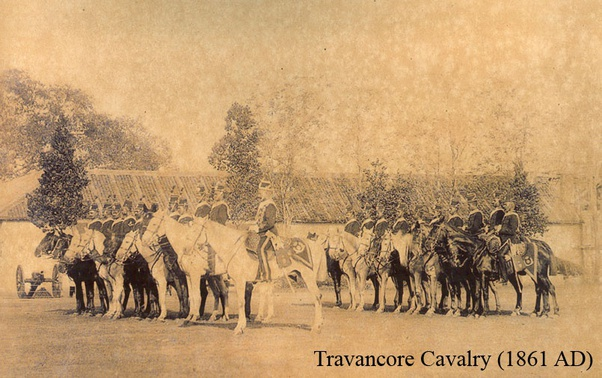
Travancore Nair Brigade in 1861

After the death of Sree Moolam Thirunal in 1924, Sethu Lakshmi Bayi became regent (1924–1931), as the heir apparent; Sree Chithira Thirunal was then a minor, 12 years old.

In 1935, Travancore joined the Indian State Forces Scheme and a Travancore unit was named 1st Travancore Nair Infantry, Travancore State Forces. The unit was reorganised as an Indian State Infantry Battalion by Lieutenant Colonel H S Steward, who was appointed commandant of the Travancore State Forces.

The last ruling king of Travancore, Chithira Thirunal Balarama Varma, reigned from 1931 to 1949. Menon states that "his reign marked revolutionary progress in the fields of education, defence, economy and society as a whole." He made the famous Temple Entry Proclamation on 12 November 1936, which opened all the Kshetrams (Hindu temples in Kerala) in Travancore to backward communities. This act won him praise from across India, most notably from Mahatma Gandhi. The first public transport system (Thiruvananthapuram–Mavelikkara) and telecommunication system (Thiruvananthapuram Palace–Mavelikkara Palace) were launched during his reign. He also began state industrialisation, introducing heavy industry in the state and established giant public sector undertakings. As many as twenty industries were established, mostly for utilising the local raw materials such as rubber, ceramics, and minerals. Even today, a majority of the premier industries in Kerala were initially established by Sree Chithira Thirunal. He patronised musicians, artists, dancers, and Vedic scholars. Sree Chithira Thirunal appointed, for the first time, an Art Advisor to the Government, Dr. G. H. Cousins. He also established a new form of University Training Corps, viz. Labour Corps, preceding the N.C.C, in the educational institutions. The expenses of the university were to be met fully by the government. Sree Chithira Thirunal also built the beautiful Kowdiar Palace, finished in 1934, which was previously an old Nalukettu given by Sree Moolam Thirunal to his mother Sethu Parvathi Bayi in 1915.

A famine in 1943 claimed approximately 90,000 lives in Travancore.

However, his prime minister, Sir C. P. Ramaswami Iyer, was unpopular among the communists of Travancore. The tension between the Communists and Iyer led to minor riots. In one such riot in Punnapra-Vayalar in 1946, the Communist rioters established their own government in the area. This was put down by the Travancore Army and Navy. The prime minister issued a statement in June 1947 that Travancore would remain an independent country instead of joining the Indian Union; subsequently, an attempt was made on his life, following which he resigned and left for Madras, to be succeeded by Sri P. G. N. Unnithan. According to witnesses such as Aiyappan Pillai, constitutional adviser to the Maharaja and historians like A. Sreedhara Menon, the rioters and mob-attacks had no bearing on the decision of the Maharaja. After several rounds of discussion and negotiation between Sree Chithira Thirunal and V. P. Menon, the king agreed that the kingdom should accede to the Indian Union on 12 August 1947. On 1 July 1949 the kingdom of Travancore was merged with the kingdom of Cochin and the short-lived state of Travancore–Kochi was formed.

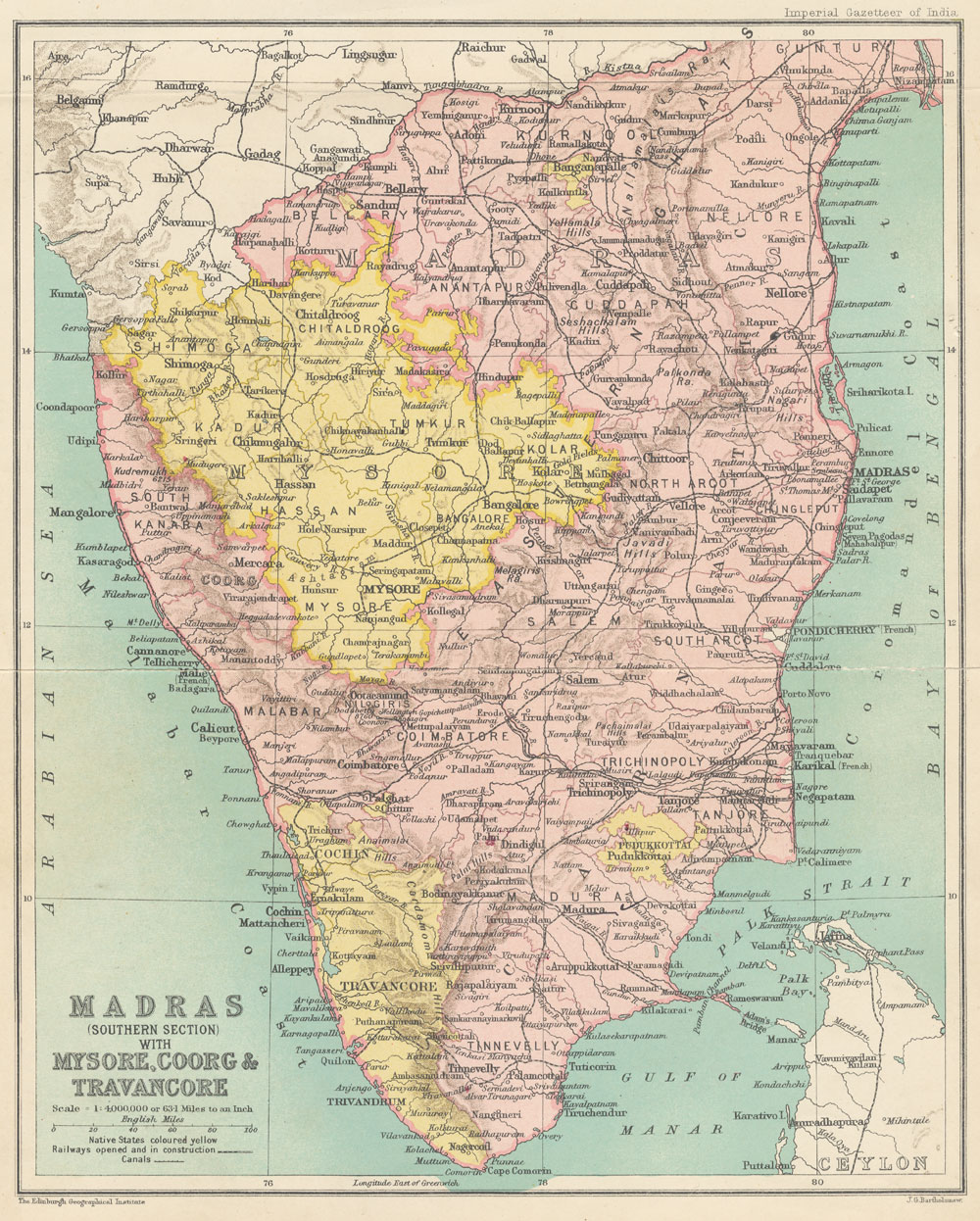
Travancore in the Madras Presidency in 1909

On 11 July 1991, Maharaja Sree Chithira Thirunal suffered a stroke and was admitted to a hospital, where he died on 20 July. He had ruled Travancore for 67 years and at his death was one of the few surviving rulers of a first-class princely state in the old British Raj. He was also the last surviving Knight Grand Commander of both the Order of the Star of India and of the Order of the Indian Empire. He was succeeded as head of the Royal House as well as the Titular Maharajah of Travancore by his younger brother, Uthradom Thirunal Marthanda Varma. The Government of India issued a stamp on 6 Nov 1991, commemorating the reforms that marked his reign in Travancore.

=== Formation of Kerala ===
The State of Kerala came into existence on 1 November 1956, with a governor appointed by the president of India as the head of state instead of a king. The king was stripped of all political powers and of the right to receive privy purses, according to the twenty-sixth amendment of the Indian constitution act of 31 July 1971. He died on 20 July 1991.

=== Merger of Kanyakumari with Madras State ===
Tamils lived in large numbers in the Thovalai, Agastheeswaram, Sengottai, Eraniel, Vilavancode, Kalkulam, Devikulam, Neyyattinkara, Thiruvananthapuram South and Thiruvananthapuram North taluks of erstwhile Travancore State. In these Tamil regions, Malayalam was the official language and there were only a few Tamil schools. This resulted in hardships for Tamils. The Travancore state government continued rejecting the requests of Tamils. During this period the Travancore State Congress favoured the idea of uniting all the Malayalam-speaking regions and forming a "Unified Kerala". In protest against this idea, many Tamil leaders vacated the party. Tamils gathered together at Nagercoil on 16 December 1945 under the leadership of Sam Nathaniel and formed the new political party All Travancore Tamilian Congress. That party pushed for the merger of Tamil regions in Travancore with Tamil Nadu. During the election campaign, clashes occurred between the Tamil Nadar community and the Malayali Nair community in Kalkulam–Vilavancode taluks. The police force suppressed the agitating Nadars. In February 1948 police opened fire and two Tamil-speaking Nadars were killed.

In the working committee meeting of Tamilian congress at Eraviputhur on 30 June 1946, the name of the political party was changed to Travancore Tamil Nadu Congress (TTNC). The TTNC was popular among the Tamils living in Thovalai and Agateeswaram taluks. Ma. Po. Sivagnanam (Ma.Po.Si) was the only leader from Tamil Nadu who acted in favour of TTNC. After the independence of India, State Assembly elections were announced in Travancore. As a consequence, TTNC improved its popularity among Tamils. A popular and leading advocate from Vilavancode, A. Nesamony organised a meeting of his supporters at Allan Memorial Hall, Nagercoil on 8 September 1947. In that meeting it was declared that they must achieve their objective through their political organisation, the TTNC. Thereafter TTNC started gaining strength and momentum in Kalkulam–Vilavancode taluks.

TTNC won in 14 constituencies in the election to the State Legislative Assembly. Mr. A. Nesamony was elected as the legislative leader of the party. Under his leadership, the awakened Tamil population was prepared to undergo any sacrifice to achieve their goal.

In 1950, a meeting was held at Palayamkottai to make compromises between the state congress and the TTNC. The meeting met with failure and Sam Nathaniel resigned from the post of president of the TTNC. P. Ramasamy Pillai, a strong follower of Nesamony, was elected as the new president. The first general election of independent India was held in 1952; TTNC won 8 legislative assembly seats. A. Chidambaranathan became the minister on behalf of TTNC in the coalition state government formed by the Congress. In the parliamentary Constituency, Nesamony was elected as M.P. and in the Rajyasabha seat. Abdul Razak was elected as M.P. on behalf of TTNC. In due course, accusing the Congress government for not showing enough care the struggle of the Tamils, the TTNC broke away from the coalition and the Congress government lost the majority, leading to fresh elections. In 1954 elections, TTNC gained victory in 12 constituencies. Pattom Thanu Pillai was the chief minister for Thiru–Kochi legislative assembly. He engaged hard measures against the agitations of Tamils, especially those in the Devikulam–Peermedu regions, who experiences atrocities by the Travancore Police force. Condemning the attitude of the police, TTNC leaders from Nagercoil went to Munnar and participated in agitations against the prohibitive orders. The leaders were arrested and an uncalm atmosphere prevailed in South Travancore.

On 11 August, Liberation Day celebrations were held at many places in South Travancore. Public meetings and processions were organised. Communists also collaborated with the agitation programmes. Police opened fire at the processions in Thoduvetty (Martandam) and Puthukadai. Nine Tamil volunteers were killed and thousands of TTNC and communist sympathisers were arrested in various parts of Tamil main land. At the end, Pattom Thanu Pillai's ministry was toppled and normalcy returned to the Tamil regions. The central government appointed the Fazal Ali Commission (December 1953) for the state's reorganisation based on language. It submitted its report on 10 August 1955. Based on this report, Devikulam–Peermedu and Neyyattinkara taluks were merged with Kerala state. On 1 November 1956 four taluks (Thovalai, Agastheeswaram, Kalkulam, Vilavancode) were recognised to form the New Kanyakumari District and merged with Tamil Nadu state. Half of Sengottai taluk was merged with Tirunelveli district. As the TTNC's primary objective was a merger of Travancore's Tamil regions with Tamil Nadu, a major part of its goal had been realised, and it was dissolved thereafter.

=== Retainment of Devikulam and Peerumedu Taluks in Kerala ===
Apart from Kanyakumari district, the taluks of Devikulam and Peermade in present-day Idukki district also had a Tamil-majority until the late 1940s. The TTNC had also requested to merge these taluks with Madras State. However, due to some decisions of Pattom Thanu Pillai, the first prime minister of Travancore, they were retained in Kerala state. Pattom came up with a colonisation project to re-engineer the demography of Cardamom Hills. His colonisation project was to relocate 8,000 Malayalam-speaking families into the taluks of Devikulam and Peermade. About 50,000 acres in these taluks, which were Tamil-majority area, were chosen for the colonisation project. As a victory of the colonisation project done by post-independence Travancore, these two taluks and a larger portion of Cardamom Hills were retained in the state of Kerala, after States Reorganisation Act (1956).

== Politics ==
Under the direct control of the King, Travancore's administration was headed by a Dewan assisted by the Neetezhutthu Pillay (secretary), Rayasom Pillay (assistant or under-secretary), as well as Rayasoms (clerks) and Kanakku Pillamars (accountants). Individual districts were run by Sarvadhikaris under the supervision of Dewan, while dealings with the neighbouring states and Europeans was under the purview of the Valia Sarvahi, who signed treaties and agreements.

=== Rulers of Travancore ===
1. Anizham Tirunal Marthanda Varma (1729–1758)
2. Karthika Thirunal Rama Varma (Dharma Raja) (1758–1798)
3. Balarama Varma I (1798–1810)
4. Gowri Lakshmi Bayi (1810–1815) – Queen 1810–1813 and Regent Queen 1813–1815
5. Gowri Parvati Bayi (Regent) (1815–1829)
6. Swathi Thirunal Rama Varma III (1813–1846)
7. Uthram Thirunal Marthanda Varma II (1846–1860)
8. Ayilyam Thirunal Rama Varma III (1860–1880)
9. Visakham Thirunal Rama Varma IV (1880–1885)
10. Sree Moolam Thirunal Rama Varma VI (1885–1924)
11. Sethu Lakshmi Bayi (Regent) (1924–1931)
12. Chithira Thirunal Balarama Varma II (1924–1949) – died 1991

=== Titular Maharajahs of Travancore since 1991 ===
1. Uthradom Thirunal Marthanda Varma III (1991–2013)
2. Moolam Thirunal Rama Varma VI (2013–)

The current heir is Revathi Thirunal Balagopal Varma – the titular Elayaraja (crown prince) (born 1953).

=== Prime ministers of Travancore ===
==== Dalawas ====
- Arumukham Pillai (1729–1736)
- Thanu Pillai (1736–1737)
- Ramayyan Dalawa (1737–1756)
- Martanda Pillai (1756–1763)
- Warkala Subbayyan (1763–1768)
- Krishna Gopalayyan (1768–1776)
- Vadiswaran Subbrahmanya Iyer (1776–1780)
- Mullen Chempakaraman Pillai (1780–1782)
- Nagercoil Ramayyan (1782–1788)
- Krishnan Chempakaraman (1788–1789)
- Raja Kesavadas (1789–1798)
- Odiery Jayanthan Sankaran Nampoothiri (1798–1799)
- Velu Thampi Dalawa (1799–1809)
- Oommini Thampi (1809–1811)

==== Dewans ====
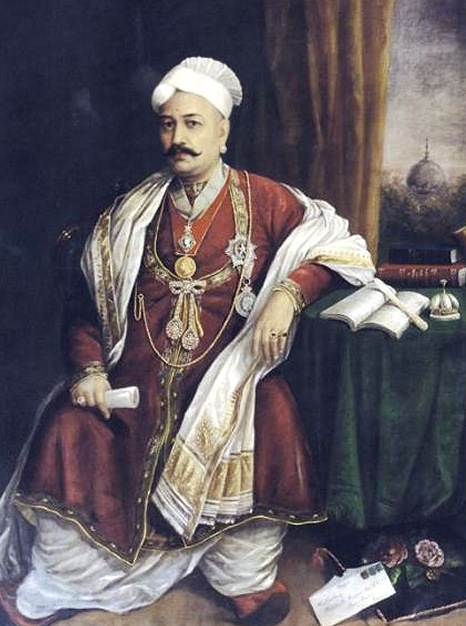
Dewan Rajah Sir T. Madhava Rao

- Col. John Munro (1811–1814)
- Devan Padmanabhan Menon (1814–1814)
- Bappu Rao (acting) (1814–1815)
- Sanku Annavi Pillai (1815–1815)
- Raman Menon (1815–1817)
- Reddy Row (1817–1821)
- T. Venkata Rao (1821–1830)
- Thanjavur Subha Rao (1830–1837)
- T. Ranga Rao (acting) (1837–1838)
- T. Venkata Rao (again) (1838–1839)
- Thanjavur Subha Rao (again) (1839–1842)
- Krishna Rao (acting) (1842–1843)
- Reddy Row (again) (1843–1845)
- Srinivasa Rao (acting) (1845–1846)
- Krishna Rao (1846–1858)

Name	Portrait	Took office	Left office	Term
T. Madhava Rao		1857	1872	1
A. Seshayya Sastri		1872	1877	1
Nanoo Pillai		1877	1880	1
V. Ramiengar		1880	1887	1
T. Rama Rao		1887	1892	1
S. Shungrasoobyer		1892	1898	1
V. Nagam Aiya		1901	1904	1
K. Krishnaswamy Rao		1898	1904	1
V. P. Madhava Rao		1904	1906	1
S. Gopalachari		1906	1907	1
P. Rajagopalachari		1907	1914	1
M. Krishnan Nair		1914	1920	1
T. Raghavaiah		1920	1925	1
M. E. Watts		1925	1929	1
V. S. Subramanya Iyer		1929	1932	1
T. Austin		1932	1934	1
Sir Muhammad Habibullah		1934	1936	1
Sir C. P. Ramaswami Iyer		1936	1947	1
P. G. N. Unnithan		1947	1947	1

=== Prime ministers of Travancore (1948–49) ===
No. (Note: A parenthetical number indicates that the incumbent has previously held office.)	Name	Portrait	Term of office			Assembly (election)	Appointed by (Monarch)	
No.	Name	Portrait	From	To	Days in office	Assembly (election)	Appointed by (Monarch)	
1	Pattom A. Thanu Pillai		24 March 1948	17 October 1948	210 days	Indian National Congress	Representative Body (1948–49)	Sir Chithira Thirunal Balarama Varma, Maharaja of Travancore
2	Paravoor T. K. Narayana Pillai		22 October 1948	1 July 1949	253 days	Indian National Congress	Representative Body (1948–49)	Sir Chithira Thirunal Balarama Varma, Maharaja of Travancore

== Administrative divisions ==
In 1856, the princely state was sub-divided into three divisions, each of which was administered by a Divan Peishkar, with a rank equivalent to a District Collector in British India. These were the:

- Northern Travancore (Cottayam) comprising the talukas of Sharetalay, Vycome, Yetmanoor, Cottayam, Chunginacherry, Meenachil, Thodupolay, Moovatupolay, Kunnathnaud, Alangaud and Paravoor;
- Quilon (Central Travancore), comprising the talukas of Quilon, Amabalapulay, Chengannoor, Pandalam, Kunnattur, Karungapully, Kartikapully, Harippad and Mavelikaray;
- Southern Travancore (Padmanabhapuram) comprising Thiruvananthapuram, Chirayinkir, Thovalay, Auguteeswarom, Kalculam, Eraneel, and Velavencode.

=== Divisions according to the 1911 Census of Travancore ===
==== 1. Padmanabhapuram Division ====
The 1911 Census Report of Travancore states that Padmanabhapuram Division was the original seat of Travancore, where Thiruvithamcode and Padmanabhapuram are located. The report further states that a vast majority of this division was ethnic Tamils. Padamanabhapuram Division consisted of the present-day district of Kanyakumari in Tamil Nadu. The report also states that the two southernmost taluks of this division, namely Thovalai and Agastheeswaram, geographically too more resembles to Pandya Nadu of Tamil country and the eastern Coromandel Coast of the Madras Presidency than the rest of Malayalam country.

==== 2. Thiruvananthapuram Division ====
This division has been the headquarters of Travancore since 1795. The Neyyattinkara taluk was a main seat of industry according to the 1911 census report of Travancore. This division also contained many ethnic Tamils, mostly concentrated in the southern taluks of Neyyattinkara and Thiruvananthapuram. The Trivandrum Division consisted of the present-day Thiruvananthapuram district excluding the British colony at Anchuthengu.

==== 3. Quilon Division ====
Quilon was the capital of Venad and the largest port town in Travancore, and was also one of the oldest ports on Malabar Coast. The 1911 Census of Travancore states that Malayalam country began from Quilon division onwards. However, the Sengottai taluk of this division, which was earlier under Kottarakkara Thampuran, was a Tamil-majority region. Geographically too, Sengottai more resembled Madurai and Pandya Nadu than rest of the Malayalam country. The Quilon division encompassed present-day Kollam district, Pathanamthitta district, Alappuzha district, and some parts of Kottayam district.

==== 4. Kottayam Division ====
This division was situated in the northernmost area of Travancore. It was a pure Malayalam-speaking and geographical region. The Vembanad Lake was a specialty of this division.

==== 5. Devikulam Division ====
This division consisted mostly of the present-day Idukki district. It was also related to Pandya Nadu and Kongu Nadu. Devikulam division was Tamil-speaking region.

== Demographics ==
Historical population
Year	Pop.	±% p.a.
1816	906,587	—
1836	1,280,668	+1.74%
1854	1,262,647	−0.08%
1875	2,311,379	+2.92%
1881	2,401,158	+0.64%
1891	2,557,736	+0.63%
1901	2,952,157	+1.44%
1911	3,428,975	+1.51%
1921	4,006,062	+1.57%
1931	5,095,973	+2.44%
1941	6,070,018	+1.76%

Religion in Travancore (1941):
1. Hinduism (60.5%)
2. Christianity (32.4%)
3. Islam (7.15%)

Travancore had a population of 6,070,018 at the time of the 1941 Census of India.

=== Religions ===
Census year	Total population	Hindus		Christians		Muslims		Source
1816 – 1820	906,587	752,371	82.99%	112,158	12.37%	42,058	4.64%	
1881	2,401,158	1,755,610	73.12%	498,542	20.76%	146,909	6.12%	
1891	2,557,736	1,871,864	73.18%	526,911	20.60%	158,823	6.21%	
1901	2,952,157	2,063,798	69.91%	697,387	23.62%	190,566	6.46%	
1911	3,428,975	2,298,390	67.03%	903,868	26.36%	226,617	6.61%	
1921	4,006,062	2,562,301	63.96%	1,172,934	29.27%	270,478	6.75%	
1931	5,095,973	3,137,795	61.57%	1,604,475	31.46%	353,274	6.93%	
1941	6,070,018	3,671,480	60.49%	1,963,808	32.35%	434,150	7.15%	

=== Languages ===
Census year	Total population	Malayalam		Tamil		Others		Source
1875	2,311,379	1,902,533	82.32%	387,909	16.78%	20,937	0.91%	
1881	2,401,158	1,937,454	80.69%	439,565	18.31%	24,139	1.01%	
1891	2,557,736	2,079,271	81.29%	448,322	17.53%	30,143	1.18%	
1901	2,952,157	2,420,049	81.98%	492,273	16.68%	39,835	1.35%	
1911	3,428,975	2,836,728	82.73%	554,618	16.17%	37,629	1.10%	
1921	4,006,062	3,349,776	83.62%	624,917	15.60%	31,369	0.78%	
1931	5,095,973	4,260,860	83.61%	788,455	15.47%	46,658	0.92%	

Distribution of Language by Division (1881)
Name of Division	Malayalam (%)	Tamil (%)
Padmanabhapuram Division	11.24	88.03
Thiruvananthapuram Division	87.05	12.09
Quilon Division	92.42	6.55
Cottayam Division	95.19	3.65
Devicolam Division	36.18	59.14

Languages by Taluks (1881)
Name of Taluk		Total population	Malayalam		Tamil		Others	
1	Thovalai	30,260	190	0.63%	29,708	98.18%	362	1.20%
2	Agasteeswaram	78,979	705	0.89%	76,645	97.04%	1,629	2.06%
3	Eraniel	112,116	9,640	8.60%	102,389	91.32%	87	0.08%
4	Culcoolum	60,908	10,528	17.29%	49,930	81.98%	450	0.74%
5	Vilavancode	69,688	18,497	26.54%	51,172	73.43%	19	0.03%
6	Neyyattinkarai	110,410	97,485	88.29%	12,809	11.60%	116	0.11%
7	Thiruvananthapuram South	51,337	39,711	77.35%	10,522	20.50%	1,104	2.15%
8	Thiruvananthapuram North	51,649	38,979	75.47%	11,102	21.50%	1,568	3.04%
9	Nedoomangad	52,211	48,492	92.88%	3,573	6.84%	146	0.28%
10	Sheraingil	87,072	82,339	94.56%	4,629	5.37%	146	0.17%
11	Kottarakkarai	55,924	51,836	94.56%	3,994	7.14%	94	0.17%
12	Pathanapuram	37,064	35,264	95.14%	1,603	4.32%	197	0.53%
13	Sengottai	30,477	7	0.02%	29,694	97.43%	776	2.55%
14	Quilon	108,469	103,775	95.67%	3,650	3.37%	1,044	0.96%
15	Kunnathur	62,700	60,330	96.22%	2,339	3.73%	31	0.05%
16	Karunagapully	101,039	99,079	98.06%	1,814	1.80%	146	0.14%
17	Karthikapully	81,969	79,705	97.24%	1,059	1.29%	1,205	1.47%
18	Mavelikkarai	111,731	107,404	96.13%	4,139	3.70%	188	0.17%
19	Chengannur	81,301	80,295	98.76%	986	1.21%	20	0.02%
20	Thiruvallai	103,007	101,041	98.09%	1,664	1.62%	302	0.29%
21	Ambalappulay	93,401	82,345	88.16%	5,864	6.28%	5,192	5.56%
22	Sharetala	113,704	107,108	94.20%	2,312	2.03%	4,284	3.77%
23	Vycome	76,414	72,827	95.31%	2,684	3.51%	903	1.81%
24	Yettoomanoor	79,058	75,004	94.87%	3,879	4.91%	175	0.22%
25	Cottayam	64,958	63,831	98.27%	722	1.11%	405	0.62%
26	Chunganacherry	74,154	66,481	89.65%	7,394	9.97%	279	0.38%
27	Meenachel	57,102	55,186	96.64%	1,857	3.25%	59	0.10%
28	Moovattupulay	95,460	93,473	97.92%	1,930	2.02%	57	0.06%
29	Todupulay	24,321	23,227	95.50%	1,085	4.46%	9	0.04%
30	Cunnathunad	109,625	108,083	98.59%	831	0.76%	711	0.65%
31	Alangaud	66,753	65,839	98.63%	571	0.86%	343	0.51%
32	Paravoor	61,966	56,495	91.17%	3,332	5.38%	2,139	3.45%
33	Cardamom Hills	6,228	2,253	36.18%	3,683	59.14%	292	4.69%
-	Travancore	2,401,158	1,937,454	80.69%	439,565	18.31%	24,139	1.01%

== Currency ==
Unlike the rest of India, Travancore divided the rupee into unique values, as represented on coins and stamps. The subunits of the currency used in the kingdom were as follows:

Unit	Equivalent Sub-units
1 Rupee	7 Fanams
1 Fanam	4 Chuckrams
1 Chuckram	16 Cash

Cash and Chuckram coins were made of copper while Fanam and Rupee coins were made of silver.

== Culture ==
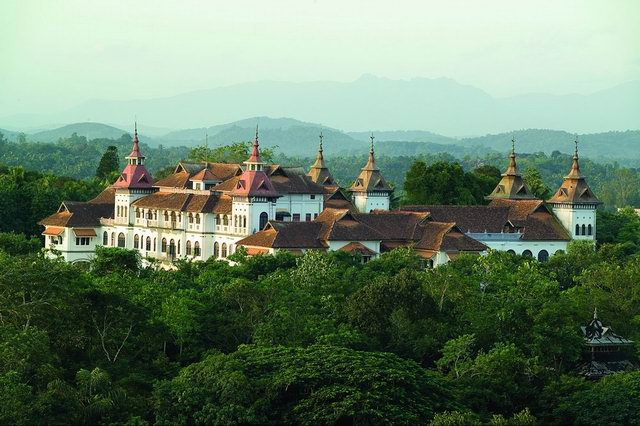
Kowdiar Palace, Thiruvananthapuram

Travancore was characterised by the popularity of its rulers among their subjects. The Kings of Travancore, unlike their counterparts in the other princely states of India, spent only a small portion of their state's resources for personal use. This was in sharp contrast with some of the northern Indian kings. Since they spent most of the state's revenue for the benefit of the public, they were naturally much loved by their subjects.

Violence rooted in religion or caste was uncommon in Travancore, but the barriers based on these parameters were rigid. Swami Vivekananda described Travancore as "The Lunatic Asylum in India" due to the level of caste discrimination. Vaikom Satyagraha pointed out the high-level casteism existed in Travancore.

Travancore was once a dominant feudal state during the Venad period, with the Nair aristocracy reaching its peak compared to other kingdoms. Later Nairs and Tamil Brahmins alone dominated the bureaucracy until the early 20th century. Many political ideologies (such as communism) and social reforms were not welcomed in Travancore, and in Punnapra, police fired at communist protesters. The Travancorean royal family are devout Hindus. Some practiced untouchability with British officers, European aristocrats, and diplomats. (For instance, Richard Temple-Nugent-Brydges-Chandos-Grenville, 3rd Duke of Buckingham and Chandos, reported that Maharaja Visakham Thirunal took a bath after shaking hands with Richard and his wife, to remove ritual pollution, when they visited in 1880.) The decline of the caste system began at the end of the 19th century due to a series of reformation movements. As a result, the kingdom of Travancore became the region with the highest male literacy rate in India.

Unlike most of India, in South Canara and Travancore (and the rest of Kerala), the social status and freedom of women who belong to forward castes were relatively high. An exception was the 19th-century Upper Cloth Revolt. The women of backward castes had not the permission to wear upper cloth in Travancore. In some communities, the daughters inherited the property (though property was exclusively administered by men, their brothers) (until 1925), were educated, and had the right to divorce and remarry. Due to laws passed by regent queen Sethu Lakshmi Bayi in 1925, patriarchy was established and now women have relatively fewer rights.

== Notable people ==
1. Paremmakkal Thoma Kathanar (1736–1799) is the author of Varthamanappusthakam (1790), the first ever travelogue in an Indian language.
2. Mor Severios (1851–1927), Metropolitan
3. Kandathil Varghese Mappillai (1857 – 6 July 1904) was an Indian journalist, translator, publisher and the founder of the newspaper Malayala Manorama and the magazine Bhashaposhini.

== See also ==
- Zamorin of Calicut
- Kingdom of Cochin
- Marthanda Varma
- Travancore-Cochin
- Thachudaya Kaimal
- Battle of Colachel
- Travancore War
- Travancore rupee
- Battle of Nedumkotta
- Travancore–Dutch War
- Cochin - Travancore Alliance (1761)
- Cochin Travancore War (1755–1756)
- Kingdom of Mysore
- Upper cloth revolt
- Vaikom Satyagraha
- Temple Entry Proclamation
- Merger of Kanyakumari with Madras State
- Madras Presidency
- Malabar District
- Marthandavarma (novel)
- The Years of Rice and Salt, an acclaimed novel that features an alternate history Travancore
