= List of state leaders in 20th-century British South Asia =

This is a List of state leaders in the 20th century (1901–1950) AD, of British Raj. These polities are vassal states under a subsidiary alliance to the British Raj. Afghan monarchies are listed at List of state leaders in the 20th century (1901–1950)#Asia: South.

== Main ==
- British Raj

Colony and princely states, 1858–1947
For details see the United Kingdom under British Isles, Europe
See also the list of princely states of British India (alphabetical) for all princely states

- Dominion of India

- Monarchs –

- George VI, King (1947–1950)

- Prime ministers (complete list) –

- Jawaharlal Nehru, Prime minister (1947–1964)

- Republic of India

- Presidents (complete list) –

- Rajendra Prasad, President (1950–1962)

- Prime ministers (complete list) –

- Jawaharlal Nehru, Prime minister (1947–1964)

== Bangladesh ==
- Nawabs of Bengal (complete list) –

- Hassan Ali Mirza, Nawab (1882–1906)
- Wasif Ali Mirza, Nawab (1906–1947)

== Bhutan ==
- Bhutan

- Monarchs (complete list) –

- Sangye Dorji, Druk Desis (1885–1901)
- Choley Yeshe Ngodub, Druk Desis (1903–1905)
- Ugyen Wangchuck, Druk Gyalpo (1907–1926)
- Jigme Wangchuck, Druk Gyalpo (1926–1952)

- Prime ministers (complete list) –

- Ugyen Dorji, Chief Minister (1907–1916)
- Sonam Topgay Dorji, Chief minister (1917–1952)

== Burma ==
- British Burma, part of the British Raj (complete list) –

British colony, 1824–1948
For details see the United Kingdom under British Isles, Europe

- Hsipaw (complete list) –

- Sao Kya Hkeng, Saopha (1866–1902)
- Sao Hke, Saopha (1902–1928)
- I Sao Ohn Kya, Saopha (1928–1938)
- Sao Kya Seng, Saopha (1947–1959)

- Kengtung State (complete list) ––

- Sao Kawng Kiao Intaleng, Administrator (?–1897), Saopha (1895–1935)
- Sao Kaung Tai, Saopha (1935–1935)
- Sao Sai Long, Saopha (1945–1962)

- Mongnai (complete list) –

- Hkun Kyi, Saopha (1888–1914)
- Hkun Kyaw Sam, Saopha (1914–1928)
- Hkun Kyaw Ho, Saopha (1928–1949)
- Sao Pye, Saopha (1949–1958)

== India ==
- Ajaigarh (complete list) –

- Ranjore Singh, Maharaja (1877–1919)
- Bhopal Singh, Maharaja (1919–1942)
- Punya Pratap Singh, Maharaja (1942–1948)

- Akkalkot (complete list) –

- Fatehsinhrao III Raje Bhosle, Chief (1896–1923)
- Vijayasinhrao Fatehsinhrao III Raje Bhosle, Chief (1915–1952)

- Alirajpur State (complete list) ––

- Pratap Singh II, Rana (1891–1911)
- Pratap Singh II, Raja (1911–1941)
- Fateh Singh, Raja (1941–1941)
- Pratap Singh, Regent (1941–1947)
- Surendra Singh, Raja (1941–1947)

- Alwar (complete list) –

- Jai Singh Prabhakar, Maharaja (1892–1937)
- Tej Singh Prabhakar, Maharaja (1937–1947)

- Balasinor (complete list) –

- Jamiyat Khanji Munawar Khanji, Nawab Babi (1899–1945)
- Muhammad Salabat Khan, Nawab Babi (1945–1947)

- Banganapalle (complete list) –

- Fath `Ali Khan, Nawab (1876–1905)
- Gholam `Ali Khan III, Nawab (1905–1922)
- John Chartres Molony, Regent (1905–1908)
- Fadli `Ali Khan III, Nawab (1922–1947)

- Bansda (complete list) –

- Pratapsimhji Ghulabsimhji, Maharaja Sahib (1876–1911)
- Indrasimhji Pratapsimhji, Maharaja Sahib (1911–1947)

- Banswara (complete list) –

- Lakshman Singh, Rai Rayan (1844–1905)
- Shambu Singh, Rai Rayan (1905–1914)
- Prithvi Singh, Rai Rayan (1913–1944)
- Chandra Vir Singh, Rai Rayan (1944–1947)

- Baoni (complete list) –

- Riaz al-Hasan Khan, Nawab (1893–1911)
- Mohammad Moshtaq al-Hasan Khan, Nawab (1911–1947)

- Baraundha (complete list) –

- Maharaja Ram Pratap Singh, Thakur (1886–1908)
- Gaya Prasad Singh, Raja (1908–1933)
- Ram Pratap Singh, Raja (1933–1947)

- Baria (complete list) –

- Mansimhji II Prithirajji, Maharawals (1864–1908)
- Ranjitsimhji Mansimhji, Maharawals (1908–1947)

- Baroda: Gaekwad dynasty

- Monarchs (complete list) –

- Maharaja Sayajirao Gaekwad III, Maharaja (1875–1939)
- Pratap Singh Gaekwad, Maharaja (1939–1951)

- Diwans (complete list) –

- S. Srinivasa Raghavaiyangar, Diwan (1895–1901)
- R. V. Dhamnaskar, Diwan (1901–1904)
- Kersaspji Rustamji Dadachanji, Diwan (1904–1909)
- Romesh Chunder Dutt, Diwan (1909–1909)
- C. N. Seddon, Diwan (1909–1912)
- Behari Lal Gupta, Diwan (1912–1914)
- V. P. Madhava Rao, Diwan (1914–1916)
- Manubhai Mehta, Diwan (1916–1927)
- V. T. Krishnamachari, Diwan (1927–1944)
- Bhadrasinh Anandrao Gaekwar, Diwan (1944–1945)
- Brojendra Lal Mitter, Diwan (1945–1947)
- Sakharam Amrit Sudhalkar, Diwan (1947–1948)
- Jivraj Narayan Mehta, Diwan (1948–1949)

- Barwani (complete list) –

- Ranjit Singh, Rana (1894–1930)
- Devi Sahib Singhji, Rana (1930–1947)

- Benares (complete list) –

- Prabhu Narayan Singh, Maharaja (1889–1911)
- Prabhu Narayan Singh, Maharaja Bahadur (1911–1931)
- Aditya Narayan Singh, Maharaja Bahadur (1931–1939)
- Vibhuti Narayan Singh, Maharaja Bahadur (1939–1947)

- Bengal Subah (complete list) –

- Hassan Ali Mirza, Nawab (1882–1906)
- Ali Mirza, Nawab (1906–1959, 1959–1969)

- Bharatpur (complete list) –

- Giriraj Kaur, Regent (f) (1900–1918)
- Kishen Singh, Maharaja (1900–1929)
- Brijendra Singh, Maharaja (1929–1947)

- Bhavnagar

- Monarchs (complete list) –

- Bhavsinhji II Takhatsinhji, Thakur Sahib (1896–1918), Maharaja Rao (1918–1919)
- Krishna Kumarsinhji Bhavsinhji, Maharaja Rao (1919–1948)

- Dewans (complete list) –

- Prabhashankar Pattani, Dewan (1900–1937)

- Bhor (complete list) –

- Shankarrao Chimnajirao Gandekar, Pant Sachiv (1871–1922)
- Raghunathrao Shankarrao Gandekar, Pant Sachiv (1922–1935), Raja (1935–1947)

- Bijawar (complete list) –

- Savant Singh, Sawai Maharaja (1900–1940)
- Govind Singh, Sawai Maharaja (1940–1947)

- Bikaner State

- Maharajas (complete list) ––

- Ganga Singh, Maharaja (1887–1943)
- British political agents-regent (1887–1898)
- Sadul Singh, Maharaja (1943–1949)

- Dewans and Chief Ministers (complete list) ––

- Hamidu Zafar Khan, Dewan (1898–1903)
- Post abolished, Dewan (1903–1916)
- Shri Bhairon Singh, Chief minister (1916–?)
- Prince Kunwar Sardul Singh, Chief minister (1920–1925)
- Manubhai Nandshankar Mehta, Dewan (1927–1934)
- Ram Prasad Dube, acting Dewan (1932–1934)
- Shri Bhairun Singh, Dewan (1934–1936)
- Thakur Sadul Singh, Dewan (1936–1936)
- V.N. Mehta, Dewan (1936–c.1938)
- Kailash Narain Haksar, Dewan (1938–1939)
- Sire Mal Bapna, Dewan (1939–c.1944)
- Kavalam Madhava Panikkar, Dewan (1944–1948)
- Kanwar Jaswant Singh, Dewan (1948–1948)
- Cadambi Sheshachar Venkatachar, Dewan (1948–1949)

- Bilaspur State (complete list) ––

- Bijai Chand, Raja (1889–1927)
- Anand Chand, Raja (1927–1948)

- Bundi (complete list) –

- Raghubir Singh, Maharao Raja (1889–1927)
- Ishwari Singh, Maharao Raja (1927–1945)
- Bahadur Singh, Maharao Raja (1945–1947)

- Cambay (complete list) –

- Najib ad-Dawla Mumtaz al-Molk Ja`far `Ali Khan, Nawab (1880–1915)
- Regent (1915–1930)
- Nizam ad-Dawla Najm ad-Dawla Mumtaz al-Molk Husayn Yawar Khan II, Nawab (1915–1947/48)

- Charkhari (complete list) –

- Malkhan Singh, Maharaja (1880–1908)
- Jujhar Singh, Maharaja (1908–1914)
- Ganga Singh, Maharaja (1914–1920)
- Arimardan Singh, Maharaja (1920–1941)
- Jayendra Singh, Maharaja (1941–1947)

- Chhatarpur (complete list) –

- Vishwanath Singh, Maharaja (1867–1932)
- Bhawani Singh, Maharaja (1932–1947)

- Chhota Udaipur (complete list) –

- Fatehsinhji, Maharawal (1895–1923)
- Natwarsinhji Fatehsinhji, Maharawal (1923–1946)
- Virendrasinhji, Maharawal (1946–1947)

- Kingdom of Cochin (complete list) –

- Rama Varma XV, Maharaja (1895–1914)
- Rama Varma XVI, Maharaja (1915–1932)
- Rama Varma XVII, Maharaja (1932–1941)
- Kerala Varma VI, Maharaja (1941–1943)
- Ravi Varma V, Maharaja (1943–1946)
- Kerala Varma VII, Maharaja (1946–1948)
- Rama Varma XVIII, Maharaja (1948–1964)

- Cooch Behar (complete list) –

- Nripendra Narayan, Maharaja (1884–1911)
- Rajendra II Narayan, Maharaja (1911–1913)
- Jitendra Narayan, Maharaja (1913–1922)
- Jagaddipendra Narayan, Maharaja (1922–1947)

- Danta (complete list) –

- Jashwantsinhji Harisinhji Barad Parmar, Maharana (1876–1908)
- Hamirsinhji Jashwantsinhji Barad Parmar, Maharana (1908–1925)
- Bhavanisinhji Hamirsinhji Barad Parmar, Maharana (1925–1947)

- Datia (complete list) –

- Bhavani Singh Bahadur, Maharaja (1865–1920)
- Govind Singh, Maharaja (1907–1947)

- Dewas Junior (complete list) –

- Lala Bisheshas Nath, Regent (1892–1913)
- Malhar Rao Puar "Bhava Sahib", Maharaja (1918–1934)
- Sadashiv Rao II Puar "Khase Sahib", Maharaja (1934–1943)
- Yeshwant Rao Puar "Bhau Sahib", Maharaja (1943–1947)

- Dewas Senior (complete list) –

- Tukoji Rao III Puar, Raja (1899–1918)
- Tukoji Rao III Puar, Maharaja (1918–1937)
- Vikramsinh Rao I Puar, Maharaja (1937–1947)
- Maharani Pramilabai, Regent (f) (1941–1943, 1947)
- Krishnajirao III, Maharaja (1947–1994)

- Dhar (complete list) –

- Udaji Raje II Pawar, Raja (1898–1926)
- Laxmibai Sahiba Regent (f) (1926–1931)
- Anand Raje IV Pawar, Raja (1926–1989)

- Dharampur (complete list) –

- Mohandevji Narayandevji, Rana (1891–1921)
- Vijaidevji Mohandevji, Rana (1921–1948)

- Dholpur (complete list) –

- Nihal Singh, Maharaja Rana (1873–1901)
- Regent (1901–1905)
- Ram Singh, Maharaja Rana (1901–1911)
- Regent (1911–1913)
- Udaybhanu Singh, Maharaja Rana (1911–1947)

- Dhrangadhra (complete list) –

- Ajitsinhji Jashwantsinhji, Raj Sahib (1900–1911)
- Ganshyamsinhji Ajitsinhji, Raj Sahib (1911–1918)
- Ganshyamsinhji Ajitsinhji, Maharaja (1918–1942)
- Mayurdhwajsinhji, Maharaja (1942–1947)

- Dhrol (complete list) –

- Harisimhji Jaisimhji, Thakur Sahib (1886–1914)
- Daulatsimhji Harisimhji, Thakur Sahib (1914–1937)
- Jorawarsimhji Dipsinhji, Thakur Sahib (1937–1939)
- Chandrasinhji Dipsinhji, Thakur Sahib (1939–1947)

- Dungarpur State (complete list) ––

- Bijay Singh, Maharawal (1898–1918)
- Laxman Singh, Maharawal (1918–1947)

- Faridkot (complete list) –

- Balbir Singh, Maharaja (1898–1906)
- Balbir Indar Singh, Maharaja (1906–1918)
- Harinder Singh, Maharaja (1918–1947)

- Garhwal (princely state) (complete list) ––

- Kirti Shah, Maharaja (1886–1913)
- Narendra Shah, Maharaja (1913–1946)
- Manabendra Shah, Maharaja (1946–1949)

- Gondal (complete list) –

- Bhagwatsimhji Sagramsimhji, Thakur Sahib (1869–1944)
- Bhojrajji Bhagwatsimhji, Thakur Sahib (1944–1947)

- Gwalior State: Scindia (complete list) –

- Madho Rao Scindia, Maharaja (1886–1925)
- Chinku Bai, Regent (f) (1925–1931)
- Gajra Rajebai, Regent (f) (1931–1936)
- Jiwajirao Scindia, Maharaja (1925–1948)

- Hyderabad

- Nizam (complete list) –

- Mahboob Ali Khan, Nizam (1869–1911)
- Mir Osman Ali Khan, Nizam (1911–1948)

- Prime ministers (complete list) –

- Kishen Pershad, Prime minister (1901–1912, 1926–1937)
- Mir Yousuf Ali Khan, Salar Jung III, Prime minister (1912–1914)
- Sayyid Ali Imam, Prime minister (1919–1922)
- Nawab Sir Faridoon-ul-Mulk Bahadur, Prime minister (1922–1924)
- Wali-ud-Daula Bahadur, Prime minister (1924–1926)
- Akbar Hydari, Prime minister (1937–1941)
- Muhammad Ahmad Said Khan Chhatari, Prime minister (1941–1946, 1947)
- Mirza Muhammad Ismail, Prime minister (1946–1947)
- Mehdi Yar Jung, acting Prime minister (1947)
- Mir Laiq Ali, provisional Prime minister (1947–1948)

- Idar (complete list) –

- Kesharisingji Jibansingji Saheb Bahadur, Maharaja (?–1901)
- Krishnasingji Kesharisingji Saheb Bahadur, Maharaja (1901)
- Pratap Singh, Maharaja (1902–1911)
- Daulat Singh, Maharaja (1911–1931)
- Himmat Singh, Maharaja (1931–1949)

- Indore: Holkar (complete list) –

- Shivajirao Holkar, Maharaja (1886–1903)

- Maharajas (complete list) –

- Tukojirao Holkar III, Maharaja (1903–1926)
- Yashwant Rao Holkar II, Maharaja (1926–1948)

- Diwans (complete list) –

- Shri Rai Bhadhur Nanak Chand Ji Airen, Prime Minister (1890–1913)
- Narayan Ganesh Chandravarkar, Diwan (1913–1920)
- Regent (1914–1916)
- Ram Prasad Dube, Diwan (1916–c.1921)
- Chettur Sankaran Nair, Diwan (1921–c.1923)
- Ram Prasad Dube, Diwan (c.1923–c.1926)
- Shri Rai Bhadhur Nanak Chand Ji Airen, Prime minister (1890–1913)
- Siremal Bapna, Prime minister (1926–1939)
- Sardar Dina Nath, Prime minister (1939–c.1942)
- Raja Gyannath Madan, Prime minister (1942–1947)
- R.G. Horton, Prime minister (1947)
- E.P. Menon, Prime minister (1947–1948)
- N.C. Mehta, Prime minister (1948)
- M.V. Bhide, Prime minister (1948)

- British Residents

- Robert Henry Jennings, British Resident (1899–1902)
- Francis Younghusband, British Resident (1902–1903)
- Oswald Vivian Bosanquet, British Resident (1903–1907)
- James Levett Kaye, British Resident (1907–1909)
- Charles Beckford Luard, British Resident (1909–1910)
- Charles Lennox Russell, British Resident (1910–1916)
- Oswald Vivian Bosanquet, British Resident (1916–1919)
- Francis Granville Beville, British Resident (c.1919–1921)
- Denys Brooke Blakeway, British Resident (1921–1924)
- Reginald Glancy, British Resident (1924–1929)
- Edward Herbert Kealy, acting British Resident (1927–1920)
- H.R.N. Pritchard, British Resident (1929–1930)
- Frederick Bailey, British Resident (1930–1931)
- G.M. Ogilvie, British Resident (1931–1932)
- Rawdon James MacNabb, British Resident (1933–1935)
- Kenneth Samuel Fitze, British Resident (1935–1940)
- Gerald Thomas Fisher, British Resident (1940–1942)
- Walter F. Campbell, British Resident (1942–1946)
- Henry Mortimer Poulton, British Resident (1946–1947)

- British Agents

- Charles S. Bayley, British Agent (1900–1905)
- Hugh Daly, British Agent (1905–1910)
- Michael Francis O'Dwyer, British Agent (1910–1912)
- John B. Wood, British Agent (1912–1913)
- Oswald Vivian Bosanquet, British Agent (1913–1916)
- Walter Campbell, British Agent (1944–1946)
- Henry Mortimer Poulton, British Agent (1946–1947)

- Jaipur State (complete list) –

- Madho Singh II, Maharaja (1880–1922)
- Sawai Man Singh II, Maharaja (1922–1947)
- Sawai Man Singh II, Maharaja (1947–1949)

- Jaisalmer State

- Maharawals (complete list) ––

- Shalivahan Singh III, Maharawal (1891–1914)
- Jawahir Singh, Maharawal (1914–1947)
- Girdhar Singh, Maharawal (1949–1950)
- Raghunath Singh, Maharawal (1950–1971)

- Dewans (complete list) ––

- Mehta Jagjiwan, Dewan (c.1890–1903)
- Lakshmi Das Sapat, Dewan (c.1909)
- Mohammed Niyaz Ali Kazi Hapiri, Dewan (1911–1912)
- (Moraji Rao) Sapat, Dewan (1912–1930)
- HH Shri Panna Lal Ji Soni Nathani, Dewan (c.1892–1902), acting Dewan (c.1930–1932)
- M.L. Khosala, Dewan (20th century)
- Pandit Jamana Lal, Dewan (20th century)
- Munshi Nand Kishore, Dewan (20th century)
- Lala Rakhpat Raj, Dewan (20th century)
- P.K. Shurugula, Dewan (20th century)
- Dewan Bahadur Brijmohan Nath Zutshi, Dewan (20th century)
- Anand Swaroop, Dewan (20th century)
- Onkar Singh, Dewan (20th century)
- Lakhpat Rai Sikund, Dewan (c.1940–c.1942)
- Bahadur Brijmohan Nath Zutshi, Dewan (c.1942–?)

- Jammu and Kashmir (complete list) –

- Pratap Singh, Maharaja (1885–1925)
- Hari Singh, Maharaja (1925–1948)
- Karan Singh, Prince Regent (1948–1952)

- Janjira (complete list) –

- Ahmad Khan, Nawab (1879–1922)
- Kulsum Begum, Regent (f) (1922–1933)
- Mohammad Khan II, Nawab (1922–1947)

- Jaora (complete list) –

- Fakhr al-Dowla Mohammad Iftekhar, Nawab (1895–1947)
- Usman Ali'Khan Bahadur, Nawab (1947–1948)

- Jawhar (complete list) –

- Patangshah IV Vikramshah Mukne, Raja (1865–1905)
- Krishnashah V Patangshah Mukne, Raja (1905–1917)
- Vikramshah V Patangshah Mukne, Raja (1917–1927)
- Patangshah V Vikramshah Mukne, Raja (1927–1947)

- Jhabua (complete list) –

- Udai Singh, Raja (1895–1942)
- Dhalip Singh, Raja (1942–1947)

- Jhalawar (complete list) –

- Bhawani Singh, Maharaja (1899–1929)
- Rajendra Singh, Maharaja (1929–1943)
- Harisch Chandra Singh, Maharaja (1943–1947)

- Jind (complete list) –

- Ranbir Singh, Raja (1887–1911), Maharaja (1911–1947)

- Jodhpur State (complete list) ––

- Sardar Singh, Maharaja (1895–1911)
- Sumair Singh, Maharaja (1911–1918)
- Umaid Singh, Maharaja (1918–1947)
- Hanwant Singh, Maharaja (1947–1949)

- Junagadh (complete list) –

- Muhammad Rasul Khanji Babi, Nawab (1892–1911)
- H.D Rendall, Administrator (1911–1920)
- Muhammad Mahabat Khan III, Nawab (1911–1959)

- Kalahandi (complete list) –

- Brij Mohan Deo, Raja (1897–1926), Maharaja (1926–1939)
- Pratap Keshari Deo, Maharaja (1919–2001)
- Udit Pratap Deo, Maharaja (1948–2019)
- Anant Pratap Deo, Maharaja (1974–?)

- Kapurthala (complete list) –

- Jagatjit Singh, Raja-i Rajgan (1877–1911), Maharaja (1911–1947)

- Karauli (complete list) –

- Bhanwar Pal, Maharaja (1886–1927)
- Bhom Pal, Maharaja (1927–1947)
- Ganesh Pal, Maharaja (1940–1947)

- Khilchipur (complete list) –

- Bhawani Singh, Rao Bahadur (1899–1908)
- Durjan Sal Singh, Rao Bahadur (1908–1928)
- Durjan Sal Singh, Raja (1928–1942)
- Yashodar Singh, Raja (1942–1947)

- Kishangarh (complete list) –

- Madan Singh, Maharaja (1900–1926)
- Yagya Narayan Singh, Maharaja (1926–1939)
- Sumar Singh, Maharaja (1939–1947)

- Kolhapur (complete list) –

- Shahu, Raja (1884–1900), Maharaja (1900–1922)
- Rajaram III, Maharaja (1922–1940)
- Tara Bai, Regent (1940–1942, 1942–1947)
- Shivaji VII, Maharaja (1942–1946)
- Shahaji II, Maharaja (1947)

- Kota (complete list) –

- Umed Singh II, Maharao (1889–1940)
- Bhim Singh II, Maharao (1940–1948)

- Kothi State (complete list) –

- Bhagwat Bahadur Singh Ju Deo, Raja Bahadur (1887–1895)
- Avadhendra Singh Ju Deo, Raja Bahadur (1895–1914)
- Sitaram Pratap Singh Ju Deo, Raja Bahadur (1914–1934)
- Kaushalendra Pratap Singh Ju Deo, Raja Bahadur (1934–1947)

- Limbdi (complete list) –

- Jashwantsinhji Fatehsinhji, Thakur Sahib (1862–1907)
- Daulatsinhji Jashwantsinhji, Thakur Sahib (1907–1940)
- Digvijaysinhji Daulatsinhji, Thakur Sahib (1940–1941)
- Chhatarsalji Digvijaysinhji, Thakur Sahib (1941–1947)

- Loharu (complete list) –

- Amiruddin Ahmad Khan, Nawab (1884–1920)
- Azizuddin Ahmad Khan, Nawab (1920–1926)
- Aminuddin Ahmad Khan II, Nawab (1926–1947)

- Lunavada (complete list) –

- Wakhat Singh Dalil Singh, Rana (1867–1929)
- Virbhadra Singh Ranjit Singh, Rana (1929–1947)

- Malerkotla (complete list) –

- Mohammad Ebrahim `Ali Khan, Nawab (1871–1908)
- Ahmad `Ali Khan, Regent (1905–1908)
- Ahmad Ali Khan, Nawab (1908–1947)

- Mallabhum (complete list) –

- Nilmoni Singha Dev, King (1889–1903)
- Kalipada Singha Thakur, King (1930–1947)

- Mandi (complete list) –

- Bhawani Sen, Raja (1902–1912)
- Joginder Sen Bahadur, Raja (1913–1986)

- Manipur (princely state) (complete list) ––

- Churachandra Singh, King (1891–1941)
- Bodhchandra Singh, King (1941–1949)

- Mayurbhanj (complete list) –

- Sriram Chandra Bhanj Deo, Raja (1882–1910)
- Ramchandra Bhanj Deo, Maharaja (1910–1912)
- Regent (1912–1928)
- Purnachandra Bhanj Deo, Maharaja (1912–1928)
- Pratapchandra Bhanj Deo, Maharaja (1928–1947)

- Morvi (complete list) –

- Waghji II Rawaji, Thakur Sahib (1870–1922)
- Lakhdirji Waghji, Thakur Sahib (1922–1926), Thakur Sahib Maharaja (1926–1947)

- Mudhol (complete list) –

- Regency (1900–1904)
- Malojirao IV Raje Ghorpade, Raja (1900–1939)
- Parvatidevi Raje Sahib, Regent (f) (1937–1947)
- Bhairavsinhrao Raje Ghorpade, Raja (1937–1947)

- Princely State of Mysore (complete list) ––

- Kempa Nanjammani Vani Vilasa Sannidhana, Regent (1894–1902)
- Krishna Raja Wadiyar IV, Maharaja (1894–1940)
- Jayachamarajendra Wadiyar, Maharaja (1940–1950)

- Nabha (complete list) –

- Hira Singh Nabha, Maharaja (1871–1911)
- Ripudaman Singh, Maharaja (1911–1928)
- Pratap Singh Nabha, Maharaja (1928–1995)

- Nagod (complete list) –

- Jadubindh Singh, Raja (1874–1922)
- Narharendra Singh, Raja (1922–1926)
- Mahendra Singh, Raja (1926–1947)

- Narsinghgarh (complete list) –

- Arjun Singh, Raja (1896–1924)
- Vikram Singh, Raja (1924–1947)

- Nawanagar (complete list) –

- Jashwantsinhji Vibhaji II, Jam Saheb (1895–1906)
- Ranjitsinhji, Jam Saheb (1907–1933)
- Digvijaysinhji, Jam Saheb (1933–1947)
- Shatrusalyasinhji, Jam Saheb (1966–1971)

- Orchha (complete list) –

- Pratap Singh, Maharaja (1874–1930)
- Vir Singh II, Maharaja (1930–1950)

- Palanpur (complete list) –

- Zobdat al-Molk Shir Mohammad Khan, Diwan (1878–1910), Nawab (1910–1918)
- Zobdat al-Molk Taley Mohammad Khan, Nawab (1918–1947)

- Palitana (complete list) –

- Mansinhji Sursinhji, Thakur Sahib (1885–1905)
- Bahadursinhji Mansinhji, Thakur Sahib (1905–1947)

- Panna (complete list) –

- Madho Singh, Maharaja (1898–1902)
- Yadvendra Singh Judeo, Maharaja (1902–1947)

- Patiala (complete list) –

- Sardar Gurmukh Singh, Regent (1900–1910)
- Bhupinder Singh, Maharaja (1900–1938)
- Yadavindra Singh, Maharaja (1938–1947)

- Patna (complete list) –

- Madho Singh, Maharaja (1898–1902)
- Yadvendra Singh Judeo, Maharaja (1902–1947)

- Porbandar (complete list) –

- Bhavsinhji Madhavsinhji, Rana (1900–1908)
- J.K. Condon, Regent (1908–1909)
- Rao Bahadur A.S. Tambe, Regent (1909–1910)
- Wala Vajsur Valera, Regent (1909–1913)
- F. de B. Hancock, Regent (1913–1916)
- Natwarsinhji Bhavsinhji, Rana (1908–1918)
- Edward O'Brien, Regent (1916–1920)
- Natwarsinhji Bhavsinhji, Maharaja (1918–1947)

- Pratapgarh (complete list) –

- Raghunath Singh, Maharawat (1890–1929)
- Ram Singh, Maharawat (1929–1947)

- Pudukkottai

- Kings (complete list) –

- Martanda Bhairava Tondaiman, King (1886–1928)
- Rajagopala Tondaiman, King (1928–1948)

- Diwans (complete list) –

- S. Venkataramadas Nayudu, Diwan (1899–1909)
- Raghunatha Pallavarayar, Diwan (1909–1924)
- K. Kunjunni Menon, Diwan (1924–1929)
- G. Ganapati Sastriar, Diwan (1929–1931)
- G. Krishnaswamy Iyer, Diwan (1931–1948)

- Radhanpur (complete list) –

- George Broodric O, Regent (1900–1901)
- Frederick William Wodehouse, Regent (1901–1903)
- Norman Sinclair Coghill, Regent (1903–1907)
- Muhammad Jalaluddin Khan, Nawab (1910–1936)
- Mortaza Khan, Nawab (1936–1947)

- Rajgarh (complete list) –

- Balbhadra Singh, Rawat (1882–1886), Raja (1886–1902)
- Bane Singh, Raja (1902–1916)
- Ram Singh, Raja (1908–1940)
- Birendra Singh, Raja (1916–1936)
- Bikramaditya Singh, Raja (1936–1947)
- Ram Charan Singh, Raja (1940–1947)

- Rajkot (complete list) –

- Regent (1890–1907)
- Lakhajiraj III Bawajiraj, Thakur Sahib (1890–1930)
- Dharmendrasinhji Lakhaji, Thakur Sahib (1930–1940)
- Pradumansinhji, Thakur Sahib (1940–1947)

- Rajpipla State (complete list) ––

- Chhatrasinhji Gambhirsinhji (1862-1915), Maharana (1897–1915)
- Sir Vijayasinhji Chhatrasinhji, 1890-1951), Maharaja (1915–1948)

- Ramnad estate (complete list) –

- Bhaskara Sethupathy, Zamindar (1889–1903)
- Raja Rajeswara Sethupathi, Zamindar (1903–1929)
- Shanmugha Rajeswara Sethupathi, Zamindar (1929–1967)
- Ramanatha Sethupathi, Zamindar (1967–1979)

- Rampur (complete list) –

- Hamid Ali Khan Bahadur, Nawab (1889–1930)
- Raza Ali Khan Bahadur, Nawab (1930–1966)
- Murtaza Ali Khan Bahadur, Nawab (1966–1971)

- Ratlam (complete list) –

- Sajjan Singh, Raja (1893–1921), Maharaja (1893–1947)
- Lokendra Singh, Maharaja (1947)

- Rewa (complete list) ––

- Venkatraman Ramanuj Prasad Singh, Maharaja (1880–1918)
- Sajjan Singh of Ratlam, Regent (1918–1919, 1922–1923)
- Philip Bannerman Warburton, Interim Regent (1919)
- Dewan Bahadur Brijmohan Nath Zutshi, Regent (1920–1922)
- Elliot James Dowell Colvin, Interim Regent (1922)
- Gulab Singh, Maharaja (1918–1946)
- Martand Singh, Maharaja (1946–1947)

- Sachin (complete list) –

- Regent (1887–1907)
- Ibrahim Mohammad Yakut Khan III, Nawab (1887–1930)
- Haydar Mohammad Yakut Khan, Nawab (1930–1947)

- Sailana (complete list) –

- Jashwant Singh II, Raja (1895–1919)
- Dileep Singh, Raja (1919–1948)

- Samthar (complete list) –

- Bir Singh, Maharaja (1896–1935)
- Radha Charan Singh, Maharaja (1935–1947)

- Sangli (complete list) –

- Dhundi Rao Chintaman, Rao (1851–1901)
- Richard John Charles Burke, Regent (1901–1910)
- Chintaman Rao II Dhundi, Rao (1901–1932)
- Chintamanrao Dhundirao Patwardhan, Raja (1932–1965)
- Vijaysinh Patwardhan, Raja (1965–?)

- Sant (complete list) –

- Jorawarsinhji Pratapsinhji, Maharana (1896–1946)
- Pravinsinhji Jorawarsinhji, Maharana (1946–1948)
- Krishnakumarsinhji Pravinsinhji, Maharana (1948–1991)

- Sawantwadi (complete list) –

- Shriram Savant Aba Saheb, Raja Bahadur (1899–1913)
- Khem Savant V Bapu Saheb, Raja Bahadur (1913–1937)
- Rani Gajara Bai Raje, Regent (f) (1913–1924)
- Shivramraje Savant Bhonsle, Raja Bahadur (1937–1947)
- Rani Parvati Bai Raje, Regent (f) (1937–1947)

- Shahpura (complete list) –

- Nahar Singh, Raja Dhiraj (1870–1932)
- Umaid Singh II, Raja Dhiraj (1932–1947)
- Sudharshandev Singh, Raja Dhiraj (1947)

- Kingdom of Sikkim (complete list) –

- Thutob Namgyal, Chogyal (1874–1914)
- Sidkeong Tulku Namgyal, Chogyal (1914)
- Tashi Namgyal, Chogyal (1914–1963)
- Palden Thondup Namgyal, Chogyal (1963–1975)

- Sirmur (complete list) –

- Surendra Bikram Prakash, Raja (1898–1911)
- Amar Prakash, Maharaja (1911–1933)
- Rajendra Prakash, Maharaja (1933–1964)
- Udai Prakash, Maharaja (1965–?)

- Sirohi (complete list) –

- Keshri Singh, Rao (1875–1889), Maharao (1889–1920)
- Sarup Ram Singh, Maharao (1920–1946)
- Tej Ram Singh, Maharao (1946–1947)
- Maharani Krishna, Maharao (1946–1947)

- Sisodia (complete list) –

- Fateh Singh, Rajput (1884–1930)
- Bhupal Singh, Rajput (1930–1947)

- Sitamau (complete list) –

- Raj Ram Singh II, Raja (1900–1947)

- Sonepur (complete list) –

- Pratap Rudra Singh, Raja (1891–1902)
- Bir Mitrodaya Singh Deo, Raja (1902–1908), Maharaja (1908–1937)
- Sudhansu Shekhar Singh Deo, Maharaja (1937–1947)

- Suket (complete list) –

- Dasht Nikandan Sen, Raja (1879–1908)
- Bhim Sen, Raja (1908–1919)
- Lakshman Sen, Raja (1919–1947)

- Tonk (complete list) –

- Ibrahim Ali Khan, Nawab (1867–1930)
- Muhammad Saadat Ali Khan, Nawab (1930–1947)
- Muhammad Faruq Ali Khan, Nawab (1947–1948)
- Muhammad Ismail Ali Khan, Nawab (1948–1974)

- Travancore

- Maharajas (complete list) –

- Moolam Thirunal, Maharaja (1885–1924)
- Sethu Lakshmi Bayi, Maharaja (1924–1931)
- Chithira Thirunal, Maharaja (1931–1949)

- Diwans (complete list) –

- K. Krishnaswamy Rao, Dewan (1898–1904)
- V. Nagam Aiya, Dewan (1901–1904)
- V. P. Madhava Rao, Dewan (1904–1906)
- S. Gopalachari, Dewan (1906–1907)
- P. Rajagopalachari, Dewan (1907–1914)
- M. Krishnan Nair, Dewan (1914–1920)
- T. Raghavaiah, Dewan (1920–1925)
- M. E. Watts, Dewan (1925–1929)
- V. S. Subramanya Iyer, Dewan (1929–1932)
- T. Austin, Dewan (1932–1934)
- Muhammad Habibullah, Dewan (1934–1936)
- C. P. Ramaswami Iyer, Dewan (1936–1947)
- P.G.N.Unnithan, Dewan (1947)

- Tripura (princely state): Manikya dynasty (complete list) ––

- Radha Kishore Manikya, Maharaja (1896–1909)
- Birendra Kishore Manikya, Maharaja (1909–1923)
- Bir Bikram Kishore Debbarma, Maharaja (1923–1947)
- Kirit Bikram Kishore Deb Barman, Maharaja (1947–1949)

- Udaipur State (complete list) ––

- Fateh Singh, Maharana (1884–1930)
- Bhupal Singh, Maharana (1930–1949)

- Wadhwan (complete list) –

- Balsinhji Chandrasinhji, Thakur Sahib (1885–1910)
- Jashwantsinhji Becharsinhji, Thakur Sahib (1910–1918)
- Jorawarsinhji Jashwantsinhji, Thakur Sahib (1918–1934)
- Surendrasinhji Jorawarsinhji, Thakur Sahib (1934–1947)

- Yawnghwe (complete list) –

- Sao Maung, Saopha (1897–1926)
- Sao Shwe Thaik, Saopha (1927–1952)

== Maldives ==
- Sultanate of the Maldive Islands: Huraa Dynasty (complete list) –

- Muhammad Shamsuddeen III, Sultan (1902–1934)
- Hassan Nooraddeen II, Sultan (1935–1943)
- Interregnum (1944–1952)
- Mohamed Amin Didi, President (1953)
- Ibrahim Muhammad Didi, Acting President (1953–1954)
- Muhammad Fareed Didi, Sultan (1954–1965), King (1965–1968)
- Ibrahim Nasir (1968–1978)
- Maumoon Abdul Gayoom (1978–2008)

== Nepal ==
- Kingdom of Nepal

- Kings (complete list) –

- Prithvi, King (1881–1911)
- Tribhuvan, King (1911–1950)
- Gyanendra, King (1950–1951, 2001–2008)

- Prime ministers (complete list) –

- Bir Shumsher Jang Bahadur Rana, Prime minister (1885–1901)
- Dev Shumsher Jang Bahadur Rana, Prime minister (1901)
- Chandra Shumsher Jang Bahadur Rana, Prime minister (1901–1929)
- Bhim Shumsher Jung Bahadur Rana, Prime minister (1929–1932)
- Juddha Shumsher Jang Bahadur Rana, Prime minister (1932–1945)
- Padma Shumsher Jang Bahadur Rana, Prime minister (1945–1948)
- Mohan Shumsher Jang Bahadur Rana, Prime minister (1948–1951)

== Pakistan ==
- Dominion of Pakistan

- Monarchs –

- George VI, King (1947–1952)

- Prime ministers (complete list) –

- Liaquat Ali Khan, Prime minister (1947–1951)

- Bahawalpur

- Nawabs (complete list) –

- Bahawal V, Nawab (1899–1907)
- Sadiq V, Nawab (1907–1955)

- Prime ministers –

- Richard Marsh Crofton, Prime minister (1942–1947)
- John Dring, Prime minister (1948–1952)
- A.R. Khan, Prime minister (1952–1955)

- Chitral (complete list) –

- Shuja ul-Mulk, Mehtar (1895–1936)
- Nasir ul-Mulk, Mehtar (1936–1943)
- Muzaffar ul-Mulk, Mehtar (1943–1949)
- Saif-ur-Rehman, Mehtar (1949–1954)
- Saif ul-Mulk Nasir, Mehtar (1954–1969)

- Khairpur (complete list) –

- Faiz Muhammad Khan Talpur I, Mir (1894–1909)
- Imam Bakhsh Khan Talpur, Mir (1909–1921)
- Ali Nawaz Khan Talpur, Mir (1921–1935)
- Faiz Muhammad Khan Talpur II, Mir (1935–1947)
- George Ali Murad Khan, Mir (1947)

- Khanate of Kalat (complete list) –

- Mir Mahmud Khan II Ahmadzai, Khan (1893–1931)
- Mir Mohammad Azam Jan Khan Ahmadzai, Khan (1931–1933)
- Mir Ahmad Yar Khan Ahmadzai, Khan (1933–1955)
- Ahmad Yar Khan Ahmadzai, Khan (1958–1979)

== Sri Lanka ==
- British Ceylon (complete list) –

Colony, 1815–1948
For details see the United Kingdom under British Isles, Europe

- Dominion of Ceylon

- Monarchs –

- George VI, King (1948–1952)

- Prime ministers (complete list) –

- Don Stephen Senanayake, Prime minister (1947–1952)

== See also ==
- List of governors of dependent territories in the 20th century
