= Bismillah Khan (disambiguation) =

Bismillah Khan may refer to

- Bismillah Khan (1914–2006), Indian musician
- Bismillah Khan (politician) (born 1948), Pakistani politician
- Bismillah Khan (cricketer) (born 1990), Pakistani cricketer
- Bismillah Khan (ruler) (1843–1895), Indian ruler

== See also ==
- Bismillah Khan Mohammadi (born 1961), Afghan politician
