= T. Austin =

T. Austin may refer to:

- Ed Austin (T. Edward Austin, Jr., 1926–2011), American politician and attorney
- T. Austin (British civil servant) (1887–1976), British civil servant of the Indian civil service
