= Murtaza Khan (ruler) =

Nawab of Radhanpur (1936–1982)

Murtaza Khan مرتضیٰ خان
- Khan

Nawab of Radhanpur
- Reign: 4 December 1936 – 11 February 1982
- Coronation: 4 January 1937
- Investiture: 7 April 1937
- Predecessor: Muhammad Jalaluddin Khan
- Successor: Nadir Ali Khan
- Born: 2 April 1889
- Died: 11 February 1982 (aged 92)
- Spouse: Umrao Bibi (m. 1925); Manowar Bhakte (m. 1929)
- Issue: Nur Jahan Bakhte
- Dynasty: Babi
- Father: Jorawar Khan

Murtaza Khan (10 October 1899 – 11 February 1982) was Nawab of Radhanpur from 4 December 1936 until his death in 1982.

== Early life, family, and education ==
Khan was born on 10 October 1899 to Jorawar Khan. Khan was a descendant of the Babi family that had ruled Radhanpur. His father, Jorawar Khan, was the son of Murtaza Khan, who in turn was a son of Jorawar Khan, the Nawab of Radhanpur. He was educated at Radhanpur High School and Rajkumar College, Rajkot. He received administrative training under the care of Muhammad Jalaluddin Khan. He married twice: firstly, in 1925, to Umrao Bibi, a daughter of Taley Muhammad Khan, and secondly, in 1929, to Manowar Bhakte, a daughter of Muhammad Jalaluddin Khan. He had an issue, a daughter, Nur Jahan Bakhte, who married Nade Ali Khan. He himself managed the revenue administration of his villages.

== Reign ==
Upon the death of his father-in-law, Muhammad Jalaluddin Khan, on 4 December 1936, he, succeeded him as the Nawab of Radhanpur. His succession as the ruler of Radhanpur was recognised by the Government of India on 1 January 1937, and on 4 January 1937 a religious ceremony was held to mark his succession. He was invested with full administrative powers on 7 April 1937. During his reign, in 1937 a prajamandal was established in his state, and in 1943, under the attachment scheme, semi-jurisdictional and non-jurisdictional talukas and estates covering 1,108 square miles were merged with his state which brought its total area to 2,258 square miles. Upon the lapse of British paramountcy in Indian subcontinent, he signed, on 14 August 1947, the instrument of accession to the Dominion of India. On 6 October 1948, he signed the merger agreement whereby his state was merged into the Bombay State. On 6 September 1970, the President of India, by the powers vested in him through article 366(22) in the Constitution of India, derecognised him. Following that, he ceased enjoying the personal rights, privileges, dignities and titles he was enjoying before this order came into effect, and stopped receiving the privy purse.

== Death ==
Khan died on 11 February 1982 and was succeeded by Nadir Ali Khan.

== Titles and styles ==
Styles of Murtaza Khan
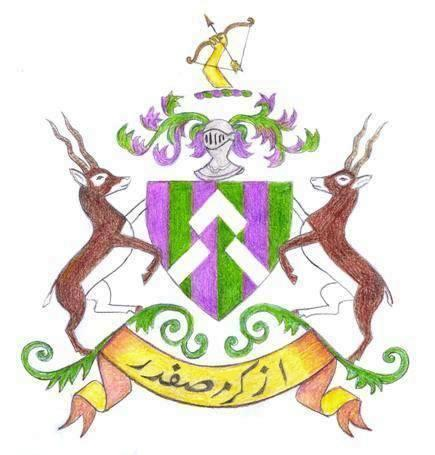
- Reference style: His Highness
- Spoken style: Your Highness

Khan held numerous titles starting from his birth as the descendant in male line of a Nawab of Radhanpur, and following his accession to the throne of Radhanpur. Each is listed below; where two dates are shown, the first indicates the date of receiving the title, and the second indicates the date of its loss or renunciation:

- 10 October 1899 – 25 February 1910: Suba Murtaza Khan Sahib of Radhanpur
- 4 December 1936 – 11 February 1982: His Highness Nawab Murtaza Khan Sahib Bahadur, Nawab of Radhanpur
