= Vikram Singh (ruler) =

Raja of Narsinghgarh from 1924 to 1957

- Raja

Raja of Narsinghgarh
- Reign: 23 April 1924 – 17 July 1957
- Predecessor: Arjun Singh
- Successor: Bhanu Prakash Singh
- Born: 21 September 1909
- Died: 17 July 1957 (aged 47)
- House: Narsinghgarh
- Dynasty: Parmar
- Father: Arjun Singh
- Mother: Shiv Kanwar
- Education: Daly College; Mayo College

Sir Vikram Singh was the Raja of Narsinghgarh from 1924 until his death in 1957.

== Birth ==
He was born on 21 September 1909 to Arjun Singh and Shiv Kanwar.

== Education ==
He was educated at Daly College, Indore, and Mayo College, Ajmer. He passed the diploma examination from the latter college in April 1927. After leaving college, he spent a year in Bangalore undergoing administrative training under the Mysore Government. In July 1928, he took a short trip to Europe, visiting England, Scotland, and France to further his education.

== Succession ==
Upon his father's death, he succeeded him as the Raja of Narsinghgarh on 23 April 1924. As he was a minor at the time, the state was administered by a council of regency, with his mother serving as regent.

== Reign ==
He was invested with full ruling powers on 7 October 1929.

== Personal life ==
He married in June 1929 a daughter of the then heir apparent of Kutch.

== Death ==
He died on 17 July 1957 and was succeeded by Bhanu Prakash Singh.

== Honours ==
He was made a Knight Commander of the Order of the Indian Empire in 1941.
