= Sher Khan II =

Nawab of Radhanpur (1895-1910)

- Haji
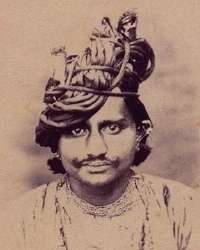
- Khan

Nawab of Radhanpur
- Reign: 19 December 1895 – 25 February 1910
- Investiture: 13 April 1907
- Predecessor: Bismillah Khan
- Successor: Muhammad Jalaluddin Khan
- Born: 8 June 1886
- Died: 25 February 1910 (aged 23)
- Spouse: Bima Akbar Bakhte (m. 1895)
- Dynasty: Babi
- Father: Bismillah Khan
- Education: Imperial Cadet Corps; Rajkumar College, Rajkot

Haji Sher Khan II (8 June 1886 – 25 February 1910) was Nawab of Radhanpur from 20 December 1895 until his death in 1910.

== Early life, family, and education ==
Khan was born on 8 June 1886 to Bismillah Khan, the Nawab of Radhanpur. He was educated at the Rajkumar College, Rajkot. While he was in college, he became known for being good at sports and horse riding. Following his studies at the college, he underwent a course of training at Imperial Cadet Corps at Dehradun. He married his cousin Bima Akbar Bakhte, a daughter of Suba Nadeali Khan.

== Reign ==
Upon the death of his father on 19 December 1895, he succeeded him to his title, rank, and dignity. Owing to his minority on the occasion, the state was placed under management of Government of India. Until he was invested with full administrative powers on 13 July 1907, the treasury and the administration of the state remained with British officers. He had an attack of paralysis in 1908, and under medical advice, he took a sea voyage to England and, there in London, placed himself under the care of Victor Horsley. In 1909, owing to his ill health, the state was placed under the care of A. O. Korrishi by the Government of India.

== Death ==
He died while at sea on 25 February 1910 and was succeeded by his brother Muhammad Jalaluddin Khan.

== Titles and styles ==
Styles of Sher Khan II
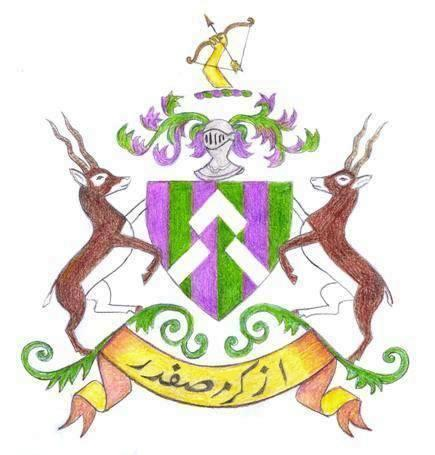
- Reference style: His Highness
- Spoken style: Your Highness

Khan held numerous titles starting from his birth, as the son of a Nawab of Radhanpur, and following his accession to his father's throne. Each is listed below; where two dates are shown, the first indicates the date of receiving the title, and the second indicates the date of its loss or renunciation:

- 8 June 1886 – 19 December 1895: Nawabzada Sher Khan Sahib of Radhanpur
- 19 December 1895 – 25 February 1910: His Highness Nawab Sher Khan II Sahib Bahadur, Nawab of Radhanpur
