= Muhammad Jalaluddin Khan =

Nawab of Radhanpur (1889–1936)

Muhammad Jalal-ud-Din Khan محمد جلال الدین خان
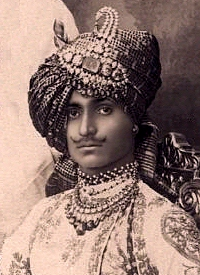
- Khan

Nawab of Radhanpur
- Reign: 25 February 1910 – 4 December 1936
- Coronation: 27 November 1910
- Predecessor: Sher Khan II
- Successor: Murtaza Khan
- Born: 2 April 1889
- Died: 4 December 1936 (aged 47)
- Spouse: Husain Bakhte (m. 1911; died 1916); Shah Begum (m. 1915)
- Issue: Manowar Bhakte
Names
- Muhammad Jalal-ud-Din Khan (محمد جلال الدین خان)
- Dynasty: Babi
- Father: Bismillah Khan

Sir Muhammad Jalal-ud-Din Khan (2 April 1889 – 4 December 1936) was Nawab of Radhanpur from 25 February 1910 until his death in 1936.

== Early life, family, and education ==
Khan was born on 2 April 1889 to Bismillah Khan, the Nawab of Radhanpur. Bismillah Khan died on 19 December 1895, and his heir-apparent and oldest son, Sher Khan II, succeeded him to his title, rank and dignity. He was educated at Rajkumar College, Rajkot. While he was there, C.E. Steele was appointed a tutor to him. He remained at school for thirteen years and graduated with a Diploma Certificate. While at school, he played various sports, including football and racquets, and won the Ranjitsinhji Challenge Cup, Gordon Medal for Athletics, Natvarsinhji Cricket Medal, and Wood Challenge Cup. Following completion of his studies, he remained with Steele in 1909 and 1910, and then for some time stayed with Coryton Mayne, the principal of the school. He learned administrative work under the supervision of J. Monteath, who was also his companion. He undertook a tour of a greater portion of India accompanied by Monteath. Khan married twice. He married firstly, on 20 June 1911, to Husain Bakhte, a daughter of Sahibzada Ahmad Khan. His first marriage was celebrated with great rejoicing and was attended by numerous guests, including several ruling princes, representatives from Baroda and other important States in the Bombay Presidency, and a large gathering of state officials and friends. He married secondly, in 1915, to Shah Begum, a daughter of Sardar Khan Muhammed Khan of Amritsar. His first wife died on 20 January 1916. He had an issue, a daughter, Manowar Bhakte, who married Murtaza Khan. Murtaza represented the senior line of Khan's cousins.

== Reign ==
When Sher Khan died on 25 February 1910, leaving behind no male issue to succeed to his title, rank, and dignity, his younger brother succeeded him as the ruler of Radhanpur. As, on the occasion, he was a minor, the state was placed under a council of administration consisting of J. Monteath and A.O. Koreshi. Upon his attaining the majority, this council of administration was withdrawn, and he was invested with full administrative powers at a special durbar held at Radhanpur by H.D. Merewether, the then Political Agent of Palanpur Agency, on 27 November 1910. He attended the Delhi Durbar of 1911. On the occasion, he participated in the state entry into Delhi. He was accompanied in a state coach by J. Monteath, and escorted by detachments of his own cavalry and infantry with a band. The banner of the State was also carried. His camp had splendid Mughal gateways decorated with floral designs. On 9 December 1911, he was received in person by George V, and a return visit was paid to him on the same date by Lord Hardinge of Penshurst, the then Viceroy and Governor-General of India. On the day of the durbar itself, he wore white and pearl and emerald jewellery and made homage to George V and Mary of Teck by making the kurnish, a form of greeting, with the right hand and a low bow, with a word of reverence, three times to each of the two. He personally oversaw the state's administration and regularly attended his office to manage government affairs. He had opened Merewether Park to the public, granted large remissions on rent arrears, abolished all internal customs duties, and paid close attention to education. He personally heard the petitions of his subjects and dispensed justice. Khan sought to improve the condition of cultivators and alleviate their poverty by abolishing the practice whereby the houses of cultivators who died intestate and without heirs were transferred to holders of heirship certificates. He granted cultivators occupancy rights, and, as a safeguard against famine, introduced a system of village grain storage. Khan established the Vadhiar Bank in 1927 to provide financial assistance to cultivators and other residents of the State by offering them loans on easy terms and at low rates of interest. When the First World War broke out, Khan offered his personal services in the field to the Government of India, coupled with an offer of 20 bodyguards (sowars) and about 70 infantry. However, the Government thanked him, saying that should the need arise, advantage would be taken of his patriotic offer. He also placed all the resources of his state at the disposal of the Government of India. He also held mass meetings, in which he explained to the people the causes that led to the war with Turkey, and that it was not a religious one. When One Day was celebrated in Palanpur Agency in 1917-18, he contributed Rs. 4500 of the total collection of Rs. 15410, and in 1918-19, he presented a sum of Rs. 25,000 to the Government of India to purchase an airplane. As Khan had no male heir, he took Murtaza under his care, trained him in administrative affairs, and nominated him as his intended successor.

== Personal interests ==
=== Sports ===
He was considered by contemporaries to be a great equestrian, a very good shooter and an excellent athlete and polo player. On 16 April 1911, in Bhandu, he won a trophy called the Gujarati Cup in the Pigsticking Meet.

=== Charity work ===
Khan had, in 1933, after surviving an aeroplane accident, instituted the Vadhiar Fund, a thanksgiving charitable fund, to help aid needy cultivators, petty merchants, tradesmen, and those who desire help for getting their children married.

== Death ==
Khan died on 4 December 1936 and was succeeded by Murtaza Khan.

== Titles, styles, and honours ==
=== Titles and styles ===
Styles of Muhammad Jalal-ud-Din Khan
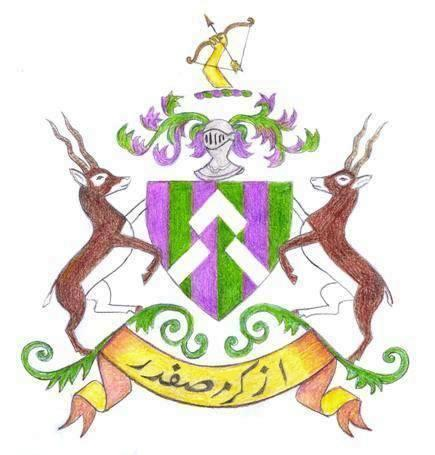
- Reference style: His Highness
- Spoken style: Your Highness

Khan held numerous titles starting from his birth as the son of a Nawab of Radhanpur, then as brother of a Nawab of Radhanpur, and following his accession to the throne of Radhanpur. Each is listed below; where two dates are shown, the first indicates the date of receiving the title, and the second indicates the date of its loss or renunciation:

- 2 April 1889 – 19 December 1895: Nawabzada Muhammad Jalal-ud-Din Khan Sahib of Radhanpur
- 19 December 1895 – 25 February 1910: Suba Muhammad Jalal-ud-Din Khan Sahib of Radhanpur
- 25 February 1910 – 4 December 1936: His Highness Nawab Muhammad Jalal-ud-Din Khan Sahib Bahadur, Nawab of Radhanpur

=== Honours ===
He also received the following commemorative medals: Delhi Durbar Medal in 1911 and King George V Silver Jubilee Medal in 1935. He was appointed Knight Commander of the Most Eminent Order of the Indian Empire by George V on 1 January 1935.
