= Muhammad Habibullah =

Indian politician and administrator

Khan Bahadur Sir Muhammad Habibullah KCSI KCIE
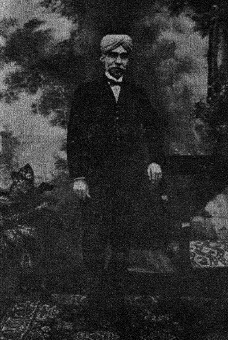
- A portrait of Sir Muhammad Habibullah

Diwan of Travancore
- In office 1934–1936
- Monarch: Chithira Thirunal
- Preceded by: T. Austin
- Succeeded by: Sir C. P. Ramaswami Iyer

Education Member of the Executive Council of the Viceroy of India
- In office December 1924 – 1930
- Governors General: E. F. L. Wood, 1st Earl of Halifax, George Goschen, 2nd Viscount Goschen (acting)
- Preceded by: Sir Mohammed Shafi

Revenue Member of the Executive Council of the Governor of Madras
- In office 17 December 1920 – 27 December 1924
- Governor: Freeman Freeman-Thomas, 1st Marquess of Willingdon, Charles Todhunter (acting), George Goschen, 2nd Viscount Goschen
- Succeeded by: T. E. Moir

Personal details
- Born: 22 September 1869 Madras
- Died: 16 May 1948 (aged 78) Madras

Khan Bahadur Sir Muhammad Habibullah KCSI KCIE (22 September 1869 – 16 May 1948) was an Indian politician and administrator who served as the Diwan of Travancore from 1934 to 1936.

== Personal life ==
Habibullah was born in Madras (now Chennai) to Aushukh Hussain Khan Saheb on 22 September 1869. He was a member of the Arcot royal family and closely related to the Nawabs of Arcot. He studied law at Zila High School in Saidapet and joined the bar at Vellore in July 1888.

He was married to Sadathunissa Begum.

== Early political career ==
Habibullah was involved in local commerce politics and was elected honorary chairman of the Vellore municipality in 1895. He resigned from his legal practice upon being elected official secretary in September 1901, and served in that role until September 1905. He was then elected chairman, a position he held for 14 years (1905–1919). From July 1919 to January 1920, he was a member of the executive council of the Governor of Madras while P. Rajagopalachari was on leave.

In 1919, Habibullah was India's delegate to the first session of the League of Nations. On 17 December 1920, he was appointed to the Governor's Executive Council for the Madras Presidency as the member for revenue, a post he held until 27 December 1924. From 1925 to 1930, he was a member of the Executive Council of the Viceroy of India. He also led India's delegation to South Africa from 1926 to 1927.

== Dewan of Travancore ==
Habibullah was appointed Dewan of Travancore by Chithira Thirunal Balarama Varma, the Maharaja of Travancore, on 15 March 1934, and remained in office for two years. During that time, many reforms were implemented in Travancore, particularly in its electoral system, state forces (the Nair Brigade) and civil services.

Immediately after taking office, he appointed a committee to determine the appropriate electoral representation for the state's various communities. Specific numbers of legislative seats were reserved for Christians, Ezhavas and Muslims. However, because of objections by the Nairs—the military caste of Travancore—the issue was not resolved and was reopened in 1939.

In 1935, Habibullah appointed a public service commissioner. This was a new post in the civil services of Travancore, without caste or religious limitations. That same year, the Pallivasal Hydroelectric Scheme was created, allowing the production of electricity in Travancore on a large, profitable scale.

His next major activity concerned the Nair Brigade. In 1936, Travancore joined the Indian State Forces, and the Nair Brigade and the Maharaja's Bodyguard came to be known collectively as the Travancore State Forces. At first, only Nairs were allowed to join, but legislation later opened military service to other castes as well. The maharaja himself was the colonel-in-chief of the forces.

Habibullah retired in 1936 and was succeeded by Sir C.P. Ramaswami Iyer. He died in Travancore on 16 May 1948.

== Honours ==
Habibullah was awarded the title of Khan Bahadur by the Indian government in 1905. He was made a Companion of the Indian Empire (CIE) in 1920 and a Knight Bachelor in the 1922 Birthday Honours. In the 1924 Birthday Honours he was promoted to Knight Commander of the Order of the Indian Empire (KCIE), and appointed a Knight Commander of the Order of the Star of India (KCSI) in the 1927 Birthday Honours.

Habibullah Road in T. Nagar, Chennai, is named after him.

== Notes ==
Preceded by T. Austin	Diwan of Travancore; 1934 to 1936	Succeeded by C. P. Ramaswami Iyer
