= S. Shungrasoobyer =

Indian politician (1836–1904)

S. Shungrasoobyer CIE
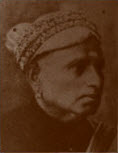

Diwan of Travancore
- In office 1892–1898
- Monarch: Moolam Thirunal
- Preceded by: T. Rama Rao
- Succeeded by: K. Krishnaswamy Rao

Personal details
- Born: 1836 Trivandrum, Travancore
- Died: 1904 (aged 67–68) Trivandrum, Travancore
- Occupation: Civil servant, Administrator
- Profession: Statesman

S. Shungrasoobyer CIE (1836–1904), also known as Sankara Subha Iyer or Sankara Stibbaiyar, was an Indian administrator who served as the Diwan of Travancore State from 1892 to 1898.

== Early life ==
Shungrasoobyer was born in 1836 in Travancore. His maternal grandfather was a pundit of the Appeal Court. Shungrasoobyer had his schooling at the Rajah's Free School, Trivandrum. On completion of his schooling in 1853, Shungrsoobyer joined the Travancore state service as a teacher on a monthly salary of Rs. 5.

== Civil service ==
Shungrasoobyer's talents were spotted by the then Diwan, Sir T. Madhava Rao, who appointed him Deputy Sheristadar of Police. Shungrasoobyer served as the Director of Vernacular Education and as Boundary Commissioner, helped resolve a boundary dispute between Travancore and the Kingdom of Cochin.

In 1882, Shungrasoobyer was appointed Settlement Diwan Peishkar of the Revenue Settlement by the then Diwan, V. Ramiengar. He performed his job well, completing the settlement of Najanad, Trivandrum and Chirayinkil taluks. In 1888, Shungrasoobyer was nominated to the Travancore Legislative Assembly. he was ordered Sunday general holiday on 1894

== Tenure as Diwan ==
Travancore was witnessing a movement for Dalit upliftment at the time Shungrasoobyer became Diwan in 1892. There was no representation for the low-caste Hindu Ezhava community in the Travancore Legislative Council, constituted in 1888. Hence, in 1895, the Ezhavas presented a memorial to the Diwan demanding more political representation. They received no substantive response.

== Later life and death ==
Shungrasoobyer retired as Diwan in April 1898 on a monthly pension of Rs. 800. The Government of British India recognized his services by making him a Companion of the Order of the Indian Empire. Sir Arthur Havelock, the Governor of Madras, appointed him a non-official member of the Madras Legislative Council.

Shungrasoobyer died in September 1904.

== See also ==
- Padmanabhan Palpu
