= K. Krishnaswamy Rao =

Indian civil servant

Kanchi Krishnaswamy Rao CIE
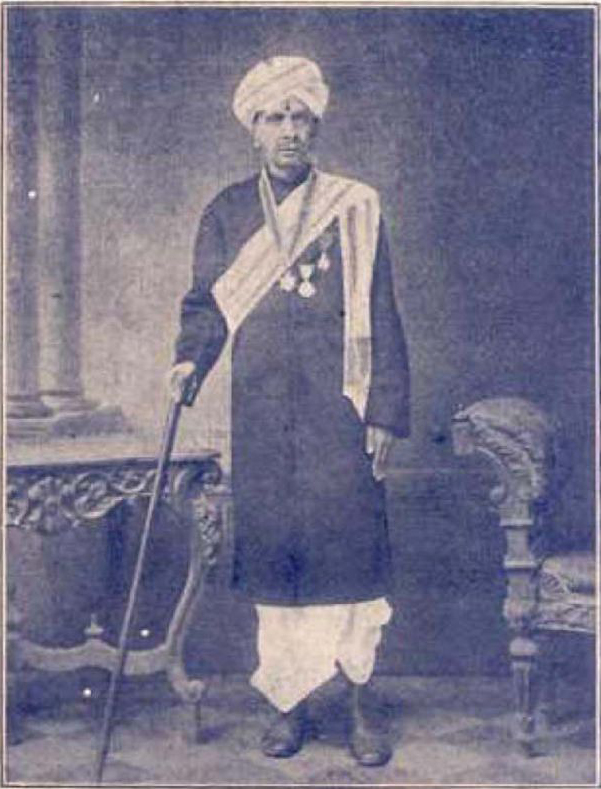
- Portrait of Krishnaswamy Rao

Diwan of Travancore
- In office 1898–1904
- Monarch: Moolam Thirunal
- Preceded by: S. Shungrasoobyer
- Succeeded by: V. P. Madhava Rao

Personal details
- Born: 1845
- Died: 1923 (aged 77–78)
- Occupation: civil servant, Administrator
- Profession: Statesman

Diwan Bahadur Kanchi Krishnaswamy Rao CIE (1845–1923) was an Indian civil servant, judge and administrator who served as the Diwan of Travancore from 1898 to 1904.

== Early life and education ==
Krishnaswamy Rao was born in Salem in September 1845. His father Kanchi Venkata Rao was a Huzur Sheristadar at the District Collectorate. He had his schooling and on completion of his matriculation at the age of sixteen, he entered government service.

== Career ==
Krishnaswamy Rao began his career in October 1864 as a record-keeper in the Nellore district court at a salary of Rs. 20. In 1867, he was promoted as Sheristadar in view of his superior abilities and became a District Munsiff in July 1870. In 1883, he was appointed sub-judge at Cocanada. In May 1894, he was made Chief Justice of Travancore by the then Maharaja and served from 1884 till his appointment as Diwan in 1898.

He was appointed a Companion of the Order of the Indian Empire (CIE) in November 1901.

== Death ==
Krishnaswamy Rao died in 1923.
