= S. Gopalachari =

Diwan of Travancore

Sarukkai Gopalachari

Diwan of Travancore
- In office 16 August 1906 – 26 October 1907
- Monarch: Moolam Thirunal
- Preceded by: V. P. Madhava Rao
- Succeeded by: P. Rajagopalachari

Diwan Bahadur Sarukkai Gopalachari (born 16 August 1850), or Gopalacharyar, was an Indian lawyer and administrator who acted as the Diwan of Travancore from 16 August 1906 to 26 October 1907.

== Early life ==
Gopalachari was born into a Vaishnavite Brahmin family in Sarukkai, Madras Presidency in the year 1850. He graduated in law and worked as a vakil in Madurai before being appointed a sub-judge on 21 March 1885. In June 1903, he was confirmed as officiating district and sessions judge. Gopalachari was serving as District Judge of Tinnevely when he was appointed Diwan of Travancore in 1906. He also worked as District Judge in Machilipatnam District Court in 1900, Krishna district. JH Munro, JH Robertsons were his successors in 1901, 1902 respectively. We can see thess names in Machilipatnam district court.
