= Narsinghgarh State =

Former Hindu Kingdom

Coordinates: 23.99°N 79.39°E

- Princely State
- 1681–1948
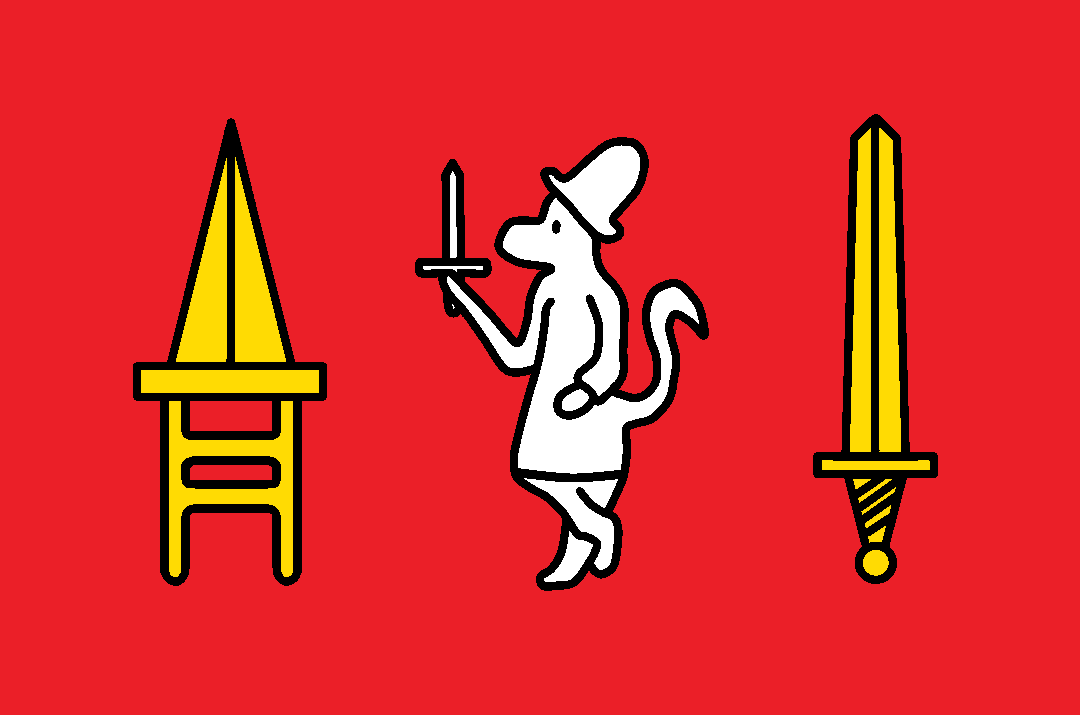
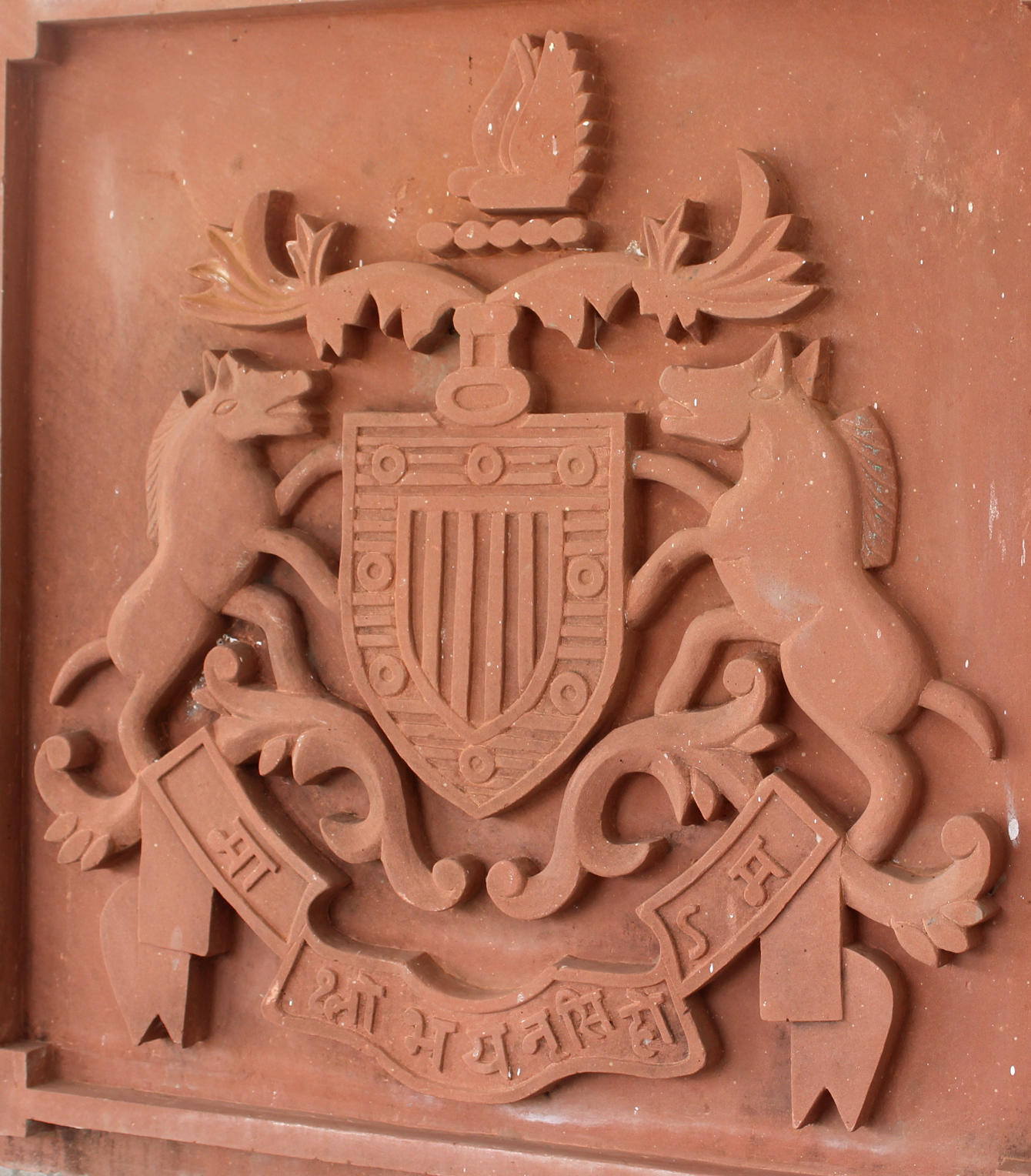
- Flag Coat of arms

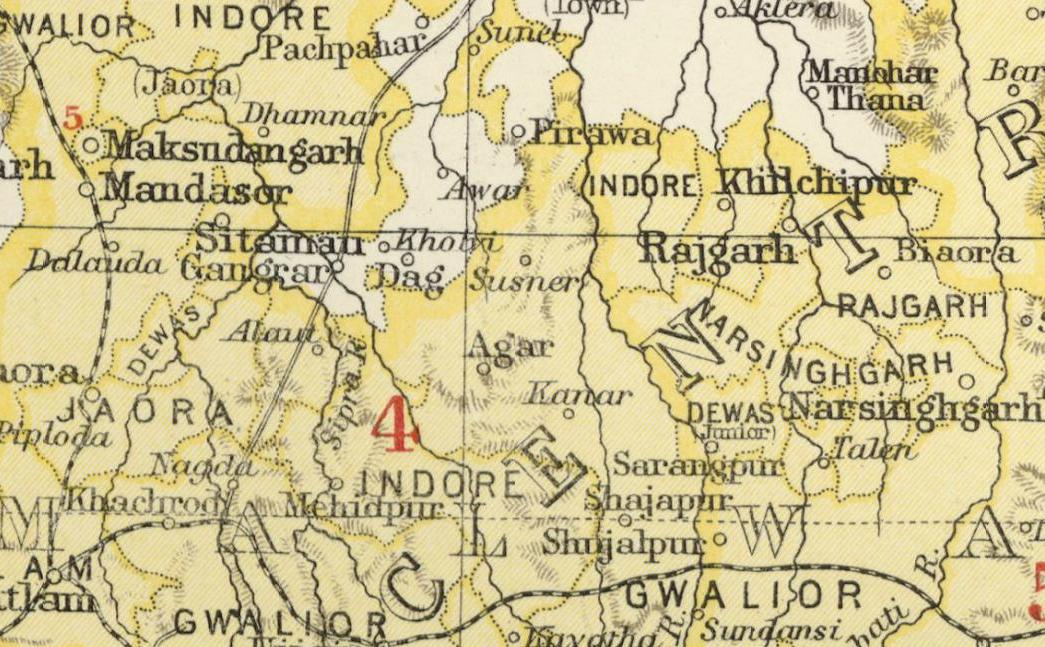
- Narsinghgarh State in the Imperial Gazetteer of India
- Capital: Narsinghgarh
- Area
  - 1948: 1,920 km^{2} (740 sq mi)
- Population
  - 1948: 140,000
- History
  - Established: 1681
  - Accession to the Union of India: 1948
Succeeded by
India

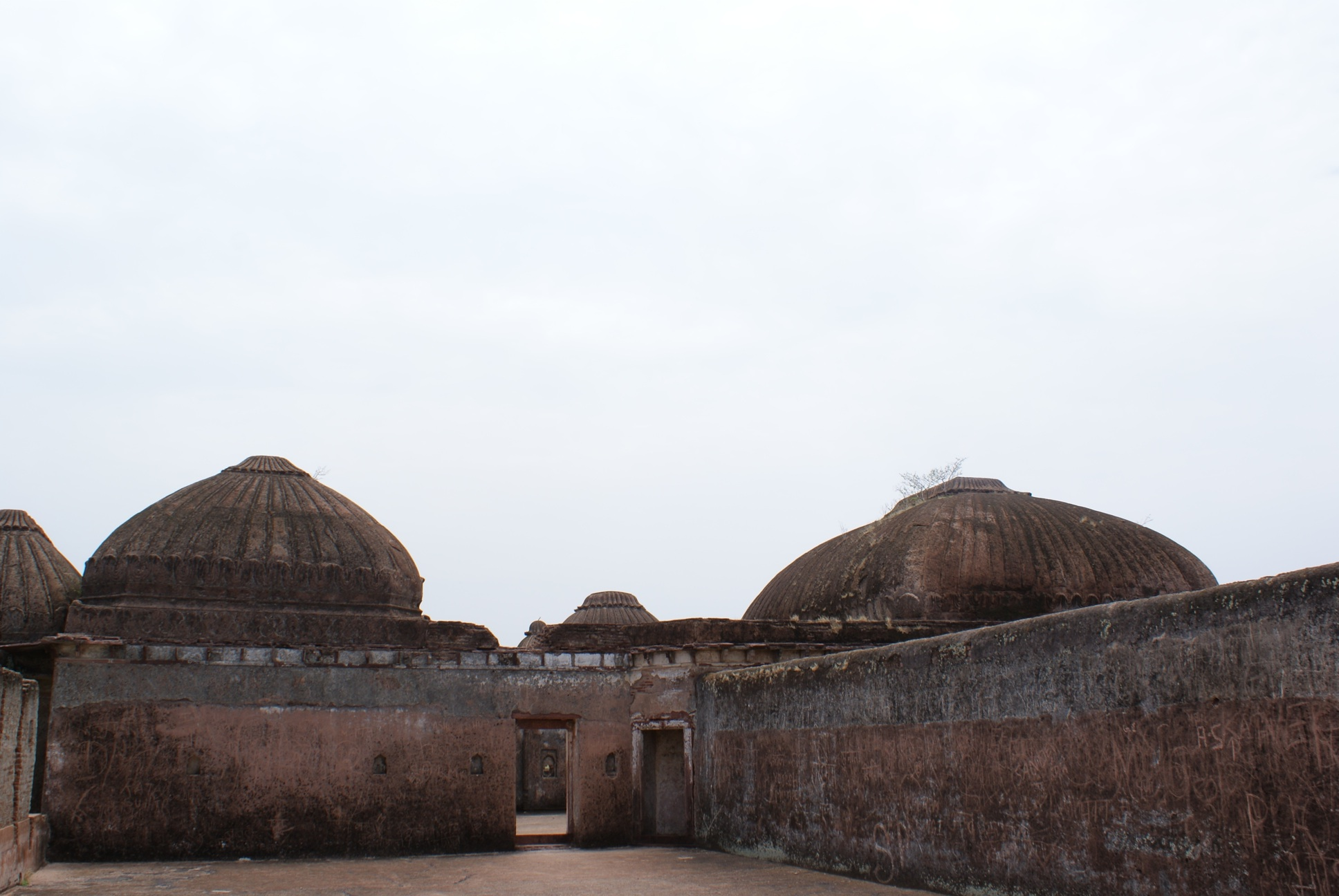
Narsinghgarh fort, the official Residence of the rulers of the state until Raja Bhanu Prakash Singhji shifted to the Bhanu Niwas Palace in the town in 1962

The Kingdom of Narsinghgarh also known as Narsinghgarh State was a princely state located in present-day Madhya Pradesh, India with its capital at Narsinghgarh from which the state was named. The ruling family was a cadet branch of the royal family of Rajgarh State.

It formed an enclave within Rajgarh State and was placed administratively under the Bhopal Agency subdivision of the Central India Agency. The state covered an area of 1,920 square kilometres (740 sq mi) and had a population of 92,093 and an average revenue of Rs.5,00,000 in 1901.

The state capital was the town of the same name, Narsinghgarh.

== History ==
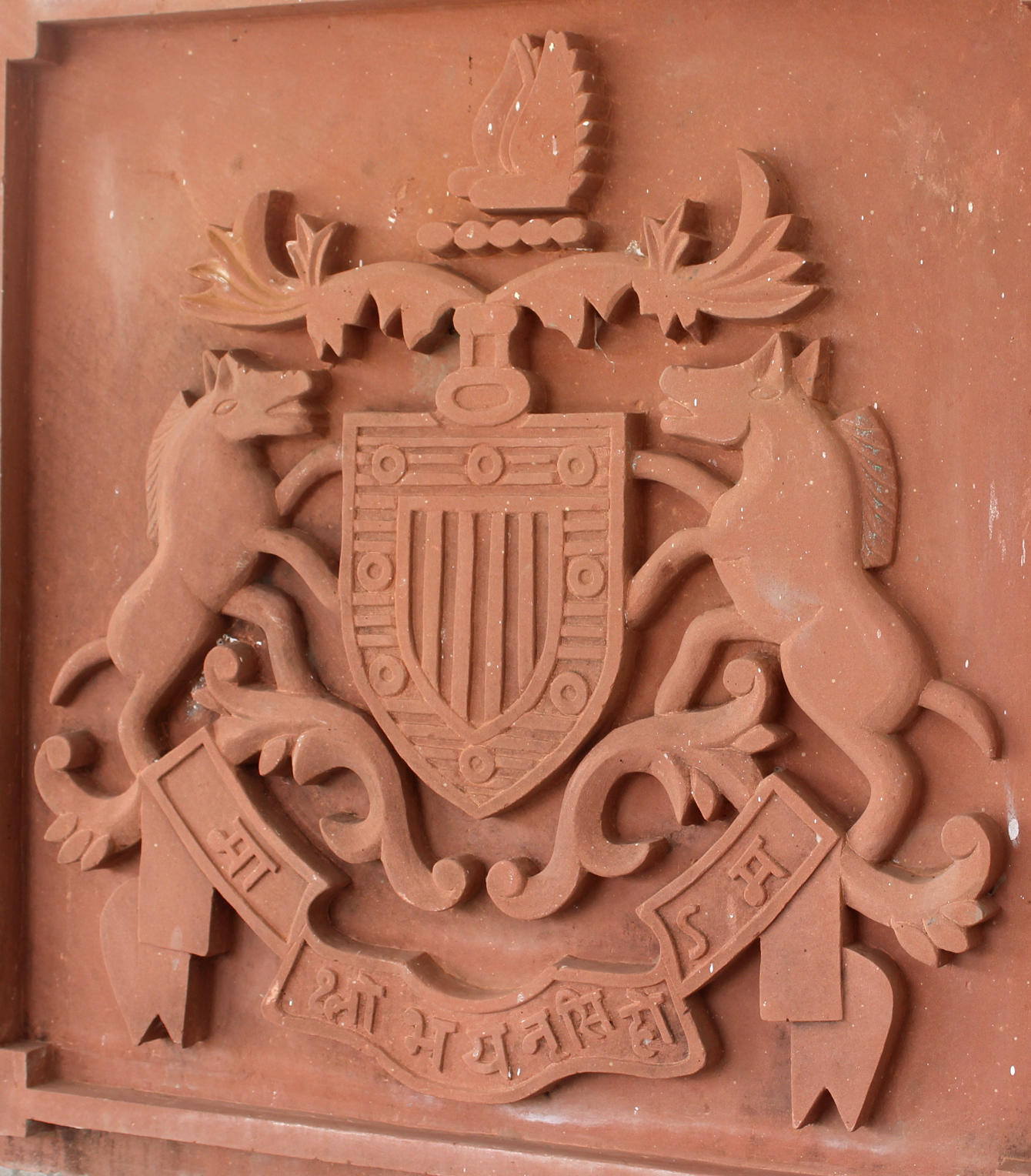
The coat of arms of Narsinghgarh State

The State of Narsinghgarh was carved out of the state of Rajgarh State by Paras Ramji, the younger brother of the then Ruler of Rajgarh, Rawat Mohan Singhji in 1681.

During the 18th century, the state was a feudatory to the Holkar rulers of Indore State, but in 1872 Narsinghgarh was recognized as a princely state by British India .

After Indian independence in 1947, the rulers of Narsingarh acceded to the Union of India, and the principality was incorporated into the new state of Madhya Bharat in 1948, which subsequently became Madhya Pradesh state on 1 November 1956.

== List of Rulers ==
The rulers of Narsinghgarh State were styled 'Raja', and were entitled to an 11-gun salute.

=== Rajas ===
- Rawat Paras Ramji (1681–95)
- Rawat Dalel Singhji (1695)
- Rawat Moti Singhji (1695–1751)
- Rawat Khuman Singhji (1751–66)
- Rawat Achal Singhji (1766–95)
- Rawat Sobhagh Singhji (1795–1827)
- 1872 - Mar 1873 Hanwant Singh (d. 1873)
- 1873 - Apr 1890 Pratap Singh (d. 1890)
- 28 Jun 1890 - 1896 Mahtab Singh (b. 1889 - d. 1896)
- 1896 - 22 Apr 1924 Arjun Singh (b. 1887 - d. 1924) (from 3 Jun 1916, Sir Arjun Singh)
- 23 Apr 1924 – 15 Aug 1947 Vikram Singh (b. 1909 - d. 1957) (from 1 Jan 1941, Sir Vikram Singh)
