= Radhanpur State =

Princely state of India

Coordinates: 23°50′N 71°36′E

- State Within the Maratha Confederacy (1731–1813); Protectorate of the East India Company (1813–1857); Princely State of the British Raj (1857–1947); State of the Dominion of India (1947–1948)
- 1753–1948
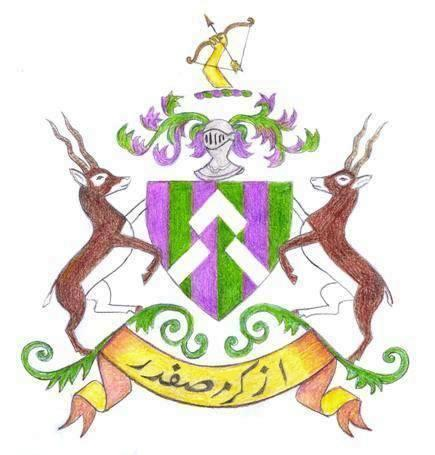
- Coat of arms

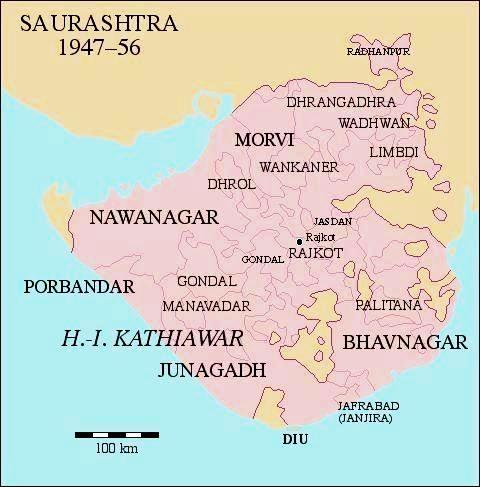
- Location of Radhanpur State at the northern end of Saurashtra
- Area
  - 1931: 2,978 km^{2} (1,150 sq mi)
- Population
  - 1931: 61,548
- Government
  - Motto: "Az Karam Safdar" (The Merciful and Valiant Warrior)
- Nawab
  - 1753 – 1765 (first): Jawan Mard Khan II
  - 1910 – 1936: Muhammad Jalaluddin Khan
  - 1936 – 1948 (last): Mortaza Khan
- History
  - Established: 1753
  - Indian independence: 1948
Preceded by	Succeeded by
Gaekwad dynasty	India

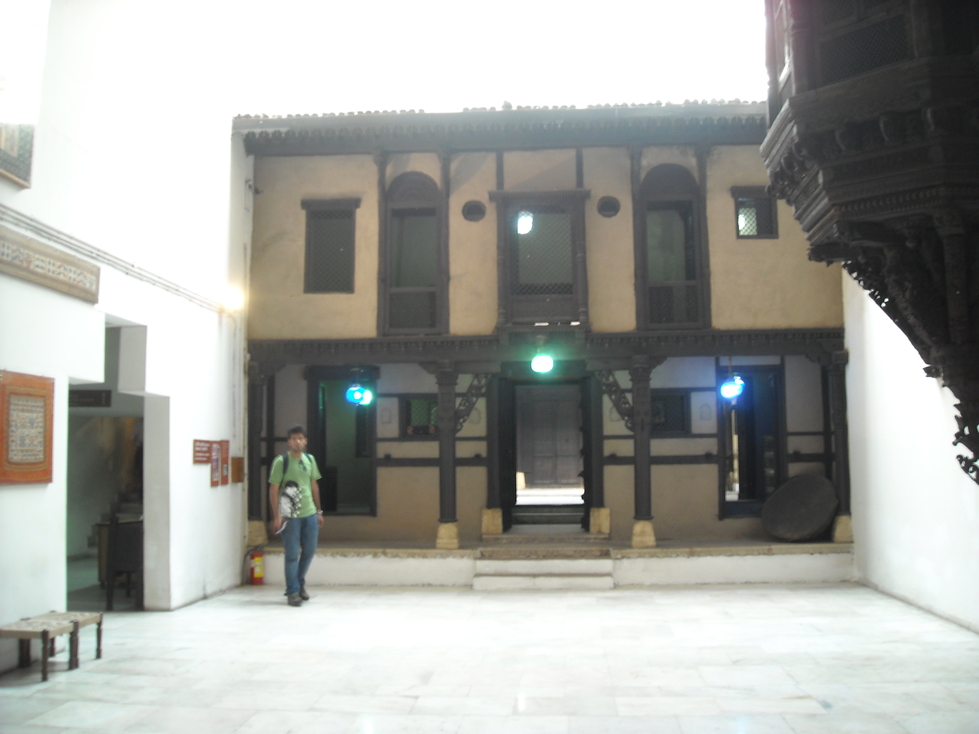
Carved Wooden houses from the palace of the Nawab of Radhanpur

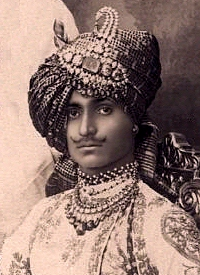
Nawab Muhammad Jalal ud-din Khan

Radhanpur State was a kingdom and later princely state in India during the British Raj. Its rulers belonged to a family of Babi House, the state was once a polity within the Mughal Empire. The last ruling Nawab of Radhanpur, Nawab Murtaza Khan, signed the instrument of accession to the Indian Union on 10 June 1948.

The town of Radhanpur in the northern region of Gujarat was its capital. It was surrounded by a loopholed wall; the town was formerly known for its export trade in rapeseed, grains, and cotton.

== History ==
In 1753 Jawan Mard Khan II, son of Jawan Mard Khan I who assisted Mughal Empire in the rule of Gujarat, became independent ruler of Radhanpur, among other territories. In 1706 Jafar Khan was appointed governor of Patan and in 1715 his son Khan Jahan (Jawan Mard Khan I) was appointed governor of Radhanpur and other territories. Khan jahan was killed by Kolis of balor while he marched against kolis. The state was an independent polity within the Mughal Empire, its proximity to the territory of the Peshwa of the Maratha Confederacy endangered the ruling Nawab to possible conflicts.

On 16 December 1813, Radhanpur became a British protectorate and in 1819 the British helped the Nawab to expel the Khosa raiders, a predatory tribe which used to make incursions from Sindh. The state was part of the Palanpur Agency of the Bombay Presidency, which in 1925 became the Banas Kantha Agency. British administrators took charge of the regency of the state on two occasions, when two separate Nawabs died leaving a minor son as successor.

The Nawab of Radhanpur was empowered by the British to control the external relations, as well as to mint the own coins, of the state. The latter privilege lasted until 1900, when Radhanpur State had to adopt the Indian currency. The state's progressive Nawab briefly introduced decimalization, with 100 fuls equaling one rupee, long before India began to use the decimal currency system in 1957.

In 1943, with the implementation of the 'attachment scheme', Radhanpur State enlarged its territory by an additional 2,234 km^{2} when some lesser princely states were merged. The population of the merged territories was about 33,000 inhabitants, which brought the total population of Radhanpur State to 100,644,

=== Rulers ===
Radhanpur State was ruled by Babi Pathans and had the right to an 11 gun salute. The rulers of the state bore the title of Nawab. They were related to the ruling houses of Junagadh and Sardargadh ,batwa, manawadar,Balasinor five other Gujarat princely states.

==== Nawabs ====
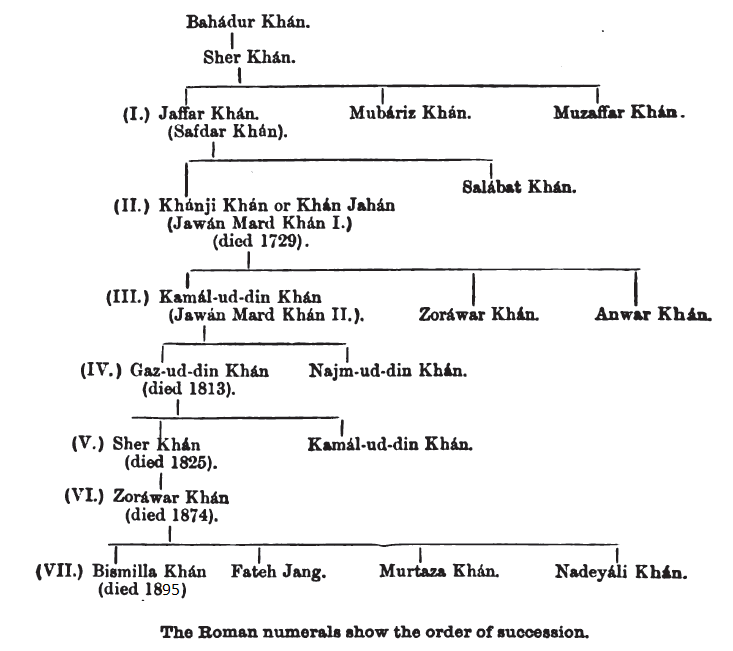
Radhanpur State Ruler Family Tree

- 30 Mar 1753 – 1765 Jawan Mard Khan II (d. 1765)
- 1765 – 1787 Muhammad Najm ad-Din Khan (d. 1787)
- 1787 – 11 May 1813 Muhammad Ghazi ad-Din Khan (b. 17.. – d. 1813)
- 11 May 1813 – 1825 Muhammad Shir Khan I (b. 1794 – d. 1825) – jointly with the following monarch –
- 11 May 1813 – 1813 Muhammad Kamal ad-Din Khan II (b. 1805 – d. 1813)
- 1825 – 9 October 1874 Muhammad Jorawar Shir Khan (b. 1822 – d. 1874)
- 1825 – 1838 Sardar Bibi Sahiba (f) – Regent
- 9 October 1874 – 20 December 1895 Mohammad Bismillah Khan (b. 1843 – d. 1895)
- 20 Dec 1895 – 25 February 1910 Mohammad Shir Khan II (b. 1886 – d. 1910)
- 20 Dec 1895 – Apr 1896 W. Beale -Regent
- Apr 1896 – 1900 Malcolm Thomas Lyde — Regent
- Jul 1900 – Dec 1901 George Broodric O'Donnell — Regent
- Dec 1901 – Aug 1903 Frederick William Wodehouse — Regent (b. 1867 – d. 1961)
- Oct 1903 – 13 April 1907 Norman Sinclair Coghill — Regent (b. 1869 – d. 19..)
- 25 Feb 1910 – 4 December 1936 Mohammad Jalal ad-Din Khan (b. 1889 – d. 1936) (from 1 January 1935, Sir Mohammad Jalal ad-Din Khan)
- 4 December 1936 – 15 August 1947 Murtaza Khan (b. 1899 – d. 199.)

== See also ==
- List of Sunni Muslim dynasties
- Political integration of India
- Palanpur Agency
- Pathans of Gujarat

== Bibliography ==
- Chisholm, Hugh, ed. (1911). "Radhanpur" . Encyclopædia Britannica. Vol. 22 (11th ed.). Cambridge University Press.
