= Moolam Thirunal =

Maharaja of Travancore from 1885–1924

Sir Rama Varma VI
- Maharaja of Travancore
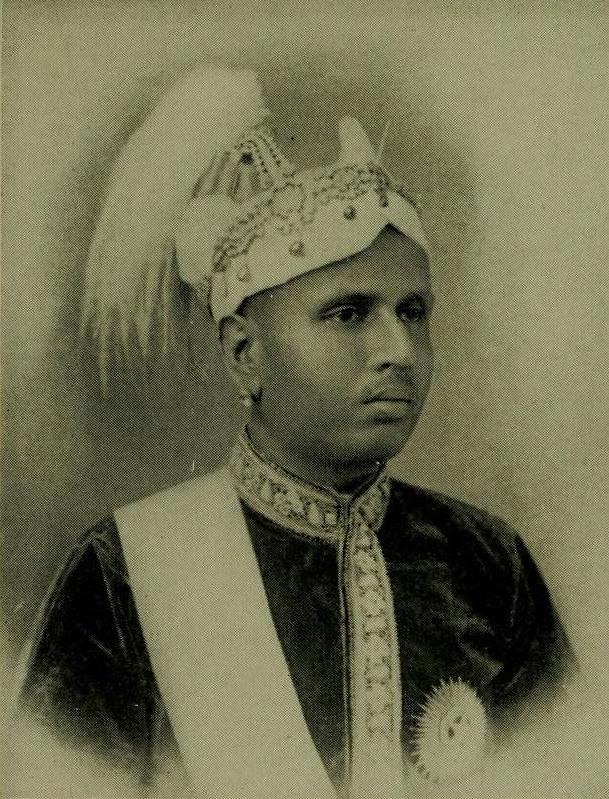
- Photograph of the Maharaja, published in 1903
- Reign: 4 August 1885 – 7 August 1924
- Predecessor: Visakham Thirunal
- Successor: Sethu Lakshmi Bayi (Regent)
- Born: 25 September 1857
- Died: 7 August 1924 (aged 66)
- Wives: Srimathi Kunjulakshmi Pillai Anantha Lakshmi Pillai Kochamma'; Vadasseri Ammachi Panapillai Amma Srimathi Lakshmi Pillai Karthyayani Pillai Kochamma
- Issue: Narayanan Chempakaraman Thampi; Karthyayani Pillai Bhagavathy Pillai Kochamma
Names
- The Maharajah of Travancore Sree Padmanabhadasa Vanchipala Sir Rama Varma VI
- House: Venad Swaroopam
- Dynasty: Kulasekhara
- Father: Changanassery Raja Raja Varma
- Mother: Junior Rani Lakshmi Bayi
- Religion: Hinduism

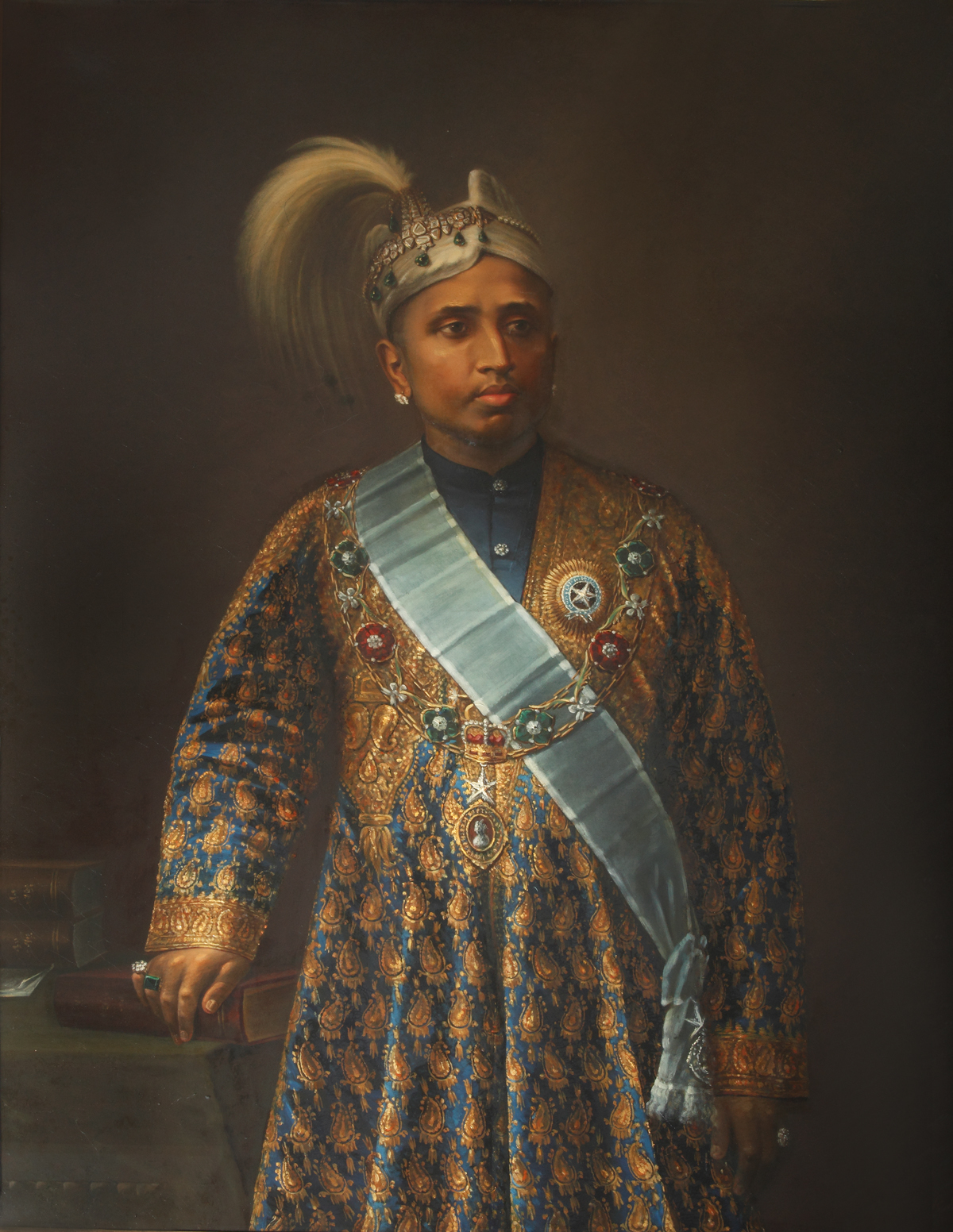
Rama Varma, Maharaja of Travancore painted by KP Thampy in 1895

Sir Sri Moolam Thirunal Rama Varma VI GCSI GCIE FRAS (1857–1924) was Maharajah of the princely state of Travancore between 1885 and 1924, succeeding his uncle Maharajah Visakham Thirunal (1880–1885). Moolam Thirunal is considered as the first in India to implement the concept of public participation in governance through the formation of Travancore Legislative Council.

== Early life and education ==
Mulam Thirunal Rama Varma was born on 25 September 1857 to Prince Raja Raja Varma of the Changanassery Royal Family and Maharani Lakshmi Bayi of Travancore, niece of Maharajah Swathi Thirunal. His mother died when he was only a few days old. The Maharajah had an elder brother, Hastham Thirunal. After the usual vernacular Malayalam studies, the two princes were placed under the tutorship of Annaji Rao B.A. and later under Raghunath Rao B.A. at a country house built specially for the purpose. Hastham Thirunal soon had to stop his studies owing to ill health and so Rama Varma remained the only pupil under the tutor. He was initially taught subjects such as history, geography, arithmetic and grammar. His great-grandmother was the Maharani Gowri Lakshmi Bayi of Travancore.

== Chief reforms ==
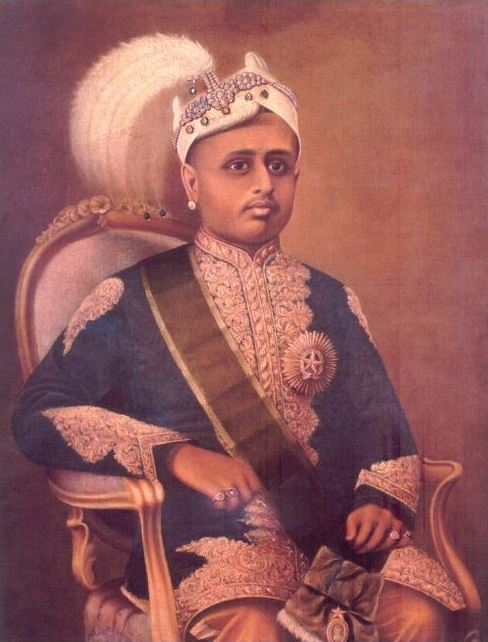
Maharaja Moolam Thirunal Rama Varma, portrait by Raja Ravi Varma

The Travancore Legislative Council was established in 1888, three years after Moolam Thirunal became Maharajah. This was the first Legislative Council for a native state in the history of India. It was later succeeded by the Sree Moolam Popular Assembly, the first legislature in Indian history to have elected members.

In 1886 a proclamation was issued relieving people of the requirement to pay of penalties on documents executed on unstamped government cadjan leaves (paper was not yet in common use in Travancore). In 1887, the penalty for non payment of stamp duty was reduced as it was found to be a huge burden. The same year, another royal proclamation was passed relinquishing the right of the government in property left by a person under the Marumakkathayam matrilineal system of inheritance when a person died without heirs. Likewise under the then system, when a tenant of a Jenmi or landlord died heirless, instead of the land passing in entirety to the landlord, it passed with sovereign right to the government who auctioned it later. This was abolished.

In 1888 the Anchal post system was improved with stamps of new values introduced. Moolam Thirunal's reign also saw major changes in the transport sector in Travancore. The first bus services began in 1908 on two routes starting from Trivandrum. The first bus on the Trivandrum-Nagercoil route was started by Arumana Narayanan Thampi, son of Visakham Thirunal while the first bus on the Trivandrum-Kollam route was started by Joseph Augusti Kayalackakom, a textile merchant of Trivandrum. Ten years later in 1918, the first train reached Trivandrum as the Chenkotta-Quilon railway was extended to Trivandrum.

Several other reforms were also brought in by Moolam Thirunal in fields including education, medicine, law and order and the civil service. Sanitary departments were opened and female education progressed. Changes were brought in the management of prisons and the public works department was reorganised. A life insurance system was also introduced by the Maharajah. In 1898, in recognition of his accomplishments, the British rewarded Moolam Thirunal with the grant of a personal salute of 21 guns.

In 1886, Thirunal allowed the construction of a paper mill in Punalur to be built by T.J. Cameroon. Upon completion, it became India's oldest paper mill. By the time of Raja's demise, the India Security Press had been a customer for the mill.

== Dewans ==
All through the reign of Maharajah Sir Rama Varma, he was assisted by advisors as Diwans or Prime Ministers. These most illustrious personalities included:

- Diwan V. Ramiengar (1880–1887)
- Diwan T. Rama Rao (1887–1892)
- Diwan S. Shungrasoobyer C.I.E. (1892–1898)
- Diwan K. Krishnaswamy Rao (1898–1904)
- Diwan V. P. Madhava Rao (1904–1906)
- Diwan S. Gopalachari (1906–1907)
- Diwan P. Rajagopalachari (1907–1914)
- Diwan M. Krishnan Nair (1914–1920)

== Family and demise ==
Sree Moolam Thirunal Maharaja of Travancore

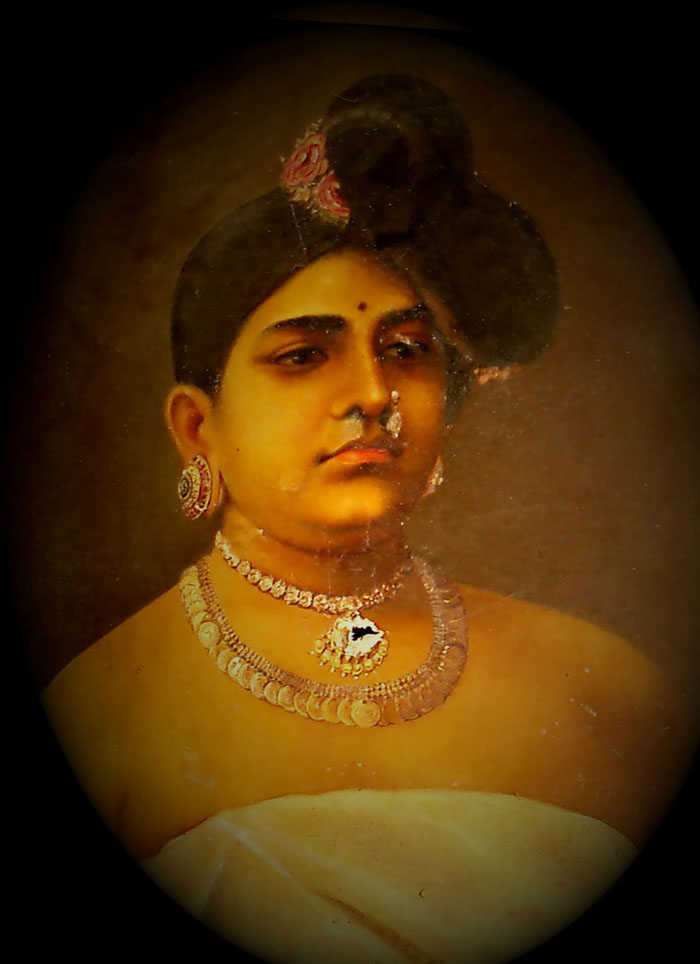
Nagercoil Ammachi, the First Consort of the Maharajah in 1879 as painted by P.Mukundan Thampi

Since the Royal House of Travancore followed the Nair Marumakkathayam system of matrilineal inheritance the presence of females was very essential in the family. Since the family had failed to exist in the female line, on the suggestion of Rani Lakshmi Bayi, two princesses, Sethu Lakshmi Bayi and Sethu Parvathi Bayi were adopted from the cousin Royal family at Mavelikara. Maharani Sethu Lakshmi Bayi succeeded Maharajah Moolam Thirunal Sir Rama Varma as Regent in 1924 till 1931, when her nephew & heir to the throne, Maharajah Chithira Thirunal Balarama Varma attained the legal age and became the last Maharajah of Travancore.

Maharajah Sir Rama Varma married twice, both noblewomen of the Thampi clan of the Nairs as tradition. His first wife (married in 1880) was Nagercoil Ammachi Panapillai Amma Srimathi Kunjulakshmi Pillai Anantha Lakshmi Pillai Kochamma, of the Nagercoil Ammaveedu family, whose aunt was the consort of Ayilyam Thirunal. She died prior to the Maharajah's accession to the throne in 1882 giving birth to an only son, Nagercoil Sri Narayanan Chempakaraman Thampi, who remained aide de camp to his father till his death. Following this the Maharajah remained single for more than a decade. The Maharajah's second wife was Vadasseri Ammachi Panapillai Amma Srimathi Lakshmi Pillai Karthyayani Pillai Kochamma, of the Vadasseri Ammaveedu family.

She originally belonged to the Kaipally family of Palkulangara but was adopted before marriage to the Maharajah into the Vadasseri Ammaveedu in 1899. She was born to Krishnan Nair (Nagercoil Ammaveedu) and Lakshmi Amma. She was the sister of play writ and author, Vadasseri Krishnan Thampi, who also was the Principal (1917 to 1934) of Sanskrit College in Trivandrum. Her other two sisters were Kalyani Pillai Kochamma and Bhageerathi Pillai Kochamma. She was first married to T. Sankaran Thampi, Palace Manager, from which marriage she had a son, V. Sri Velayudhan Thampi in 1898. From her marriage to the Maharajah she had a daughter, Vadasseri Shrimathi Kartyayani Pillai Bhagavathi Pillai Kochamma, in June 1901. Her elder son was also adopted by Moolam Thirunal (This was not the first instance of a Maharajah espousing an already married woman. Moolam Thirunal's uncle Ayilyam Thirunal's consort was also already married before she became royal consort in 1862). Ulloor S. Parameswara Iyer writes about the Maharajah's consort in Progress of Travancore Under HH Sree Moolam Thirunal:

..Karthyayani Pilla Kochamma by birth belongs to a very ancient and highly respected Nair family in Trivandrum and is a lady of remarkable culture and attainments, a gifted pianist, musician and artist. Her many lovable and ennobling qualities have won for her a warm place in the hearts of His Highness' subjects..

== Sankaran Thampi of Sankaramangalam ==
T. Sankaran Thampi (1857 - 1930), the principal favourite and relative of the Maharajah, was the all-powerful Palace Manager, the power behind the throne. He belonged to Sankaramangalam Family, a branch of Cheruvallil Tharavad at Karicode in Quilon. His emergence as the leading favourite of the Maharajah limited the influence of another favourite Saravanai Ananda Narayana Aiyar. Thampi was often referred to as Sree Moolam Thirunal's Piers Gaveston.

Sankaran Thampi was closely associated with C. V. Raman Pillai. Two of Thampi's brothers were Tahsildars. Thampi survived the Dewanship of VP Madhava Rao, who tried to displace him. He remained powerful until the Maharaja's demise in 1924.

== Official full name ==
Officially he was also known with his full name, style and honours: Colonel His Highness Sri Padmanabhadasa Vanchipala Sree Moolam Thirunal Rama Varma Kulasekhara Kiritapathi Manney Sultan Maharajah Raja Ramaraja Bahadur Shamsher Jang, Maharajah Of Travancore.

== Honours ==
- GCSI: Knight Grand Commander of the Order of the Star of India
- GCIE: Knight Grand Commander of the Order of the Indian Empire – 1903 – in the 1903 Durbar Honours
- FRAS: Fellow of the Royal Asiatic Society

== See also ==
- Chithira Thirunal Balarama Varma
- Sethu Lakshmi Bayi
- Visakham Thirunal
- Kappazhom Raman Pillai
- Moolam Thirunal Rama Varma (later)
- Trivandrum
- Sri Moolam Thirunal Palace
- Sree Moolam Popular Assembly

Moolam Thirunal Kulasekhara Dynasty Born: 25 September 1857 Died: 7 March 1924
Regnal titles
Preceded by Visakham Thirunal	Maharaja of Travancore; 1885–1924	Succeeded by Chithira Thirunal
