= Bhandu =

- Village
- Location in Gujarat, India Bhandu (India)
- Coordinates: 23°42′N 72°22′E
- Country: India
- State: Gujarat
- District: Patan (1997-2010); Mehsana(2011 present)

Languages
  - Official: Gujarati, Hindi
- Time zone: UTC+5:30 (IST)
- Vehicle registration: GJ-2
- Nearest city: Mehsana

Bhandu is a village in Visnagar Taluka of Mahesana district in Gujarat, India. It is located about 10 kilometres (6.2 mi) from Mehsana and 17 kilometres (11 mi) from Visnagar

== Places of importance ==
The villages of idols of Saptamatrikas.

There are four major Hindu temples: Brahmani Mata, Varahi Mata, Devi Mata, Rushi Timba and Dudheshwar Mahadev temple. The village observes the annual festival on Dharo Atham/Bhadarava Sud Atham (the eighth day of Bhadarava month of the Hindu calendar).

Settled by Barot (Brahmbhatt) community, the village was formerly known as Bhatawada which became abhapras and became Bhandu where Ambaji Mataji's temple and Angashi Mataji's temple are located and also Kuladevi Shri Nagneshwari of Barot (Brahmbhatt) community

== Geography ==
Several ponds and a large lake spread in 40 acres (84 Bighas) which is connected with Sujalam Suflam canal network, part of Narmada canal network.

== Amenities ==
The village has primary as well as secondary schools, colleges, banks, a post office and a hospital. The schools include T. K. Vidyalaya and Shree Adarsh Kanya Vidyalaya. The colleges include L. C. Institute of Technology as well as nursing, physiotherapy and homeopathy colleges. There are PTC and BEd colleges as well.

== Transport ==
Bhandu is connected by Ahmedabad-Palanpur State Highway and a railway station on Jaipur–Ahmedabad line.
