= M. Krishnan Nair (politician) =

Indian politician

Sir Mannath Krishnan Nair KCIE

Law Member of the Executive Council of the Governor of Madras
- In office 1928–1933
- Premier: P. Subbarayan, B. Munuswamy Naidu, Ramakrishna Ranga Rao of Bobbili
- Governor: George Goschen, 2nd Viscount Goschen
- Preceded by: Sir C. P. Ramaswami Iyer

Dewan of Travancore
- In office 11 May 1914 – 7 July 1920
- Monarch: Moolam Thirunal
- Preceded by: Sir P. Rajagopalachari
- Succeeded by: T. Raghavaiah

Personal details
- Born: 1870 Malabar district
- Died: 1938 (aged 67–68)

Diwan Bahadur Sir Mannath Krishnan Nair KCIE (1870–1938) was an Indian politician from the Indian National Congress and later, Justice Party who served as a member of the Madras Legislative Council and later, executive council of the Governor of Madras. He also served as the Chief Justice of Travancore High Court and later Diwan of Travancore from 1914 to 1920(?)

== Early life and political career ==
Krishnan Nair was born in 1870 in the Mannath family of landlords from the Malabar district of Madras Presidency. Krishnan Nair had his schooling in Malabar district and higher education at the Government College, Calcutta and Madras Christian College. Krishnan Nair studied law at the Madras Law College before enrolling as a lawyer.

At a young age, he joined the Indian National Congress and participated in its meetings. He was elected to the Madras Legislative Council in 1904 and served as its member from 1904 to 1910.

Both his sons were also in the Imperial Civil Service(ICS). Elder son P A Menon, was an ambassador for India, in many countries. Second son, P M Menon, too was a Secartary to Government of India. His daughter married Appu Nair who was Secretary to Madras Government and their daughter married P Govindan Nair also an ICS Officer.

== Diwan of Travancore ==
Krishnan Nair was appointed Diwan of Travancore in 1914 and he succeeded Sir P. Rajagopalachari. Krishnan Nair served as Diwan of Travancore from 1914 to 1920.

== Justice Party ==
In 1920, Nair joined the Justice Party and won the 1920 and 1923 elections, the latter by allegedly polarizing the communal atmosphere in the Malabar district in the wake of the 1922 Moplah riots.

When the Justice Party joined hands with the Swarajya Party against the Simon Commission, the then Governor of Madras, Lord Goschen appointed Krishnan Nair, then a Justice Party member, as his law member in order to woo the Justice Party. As law member, Krishnan Nair expressed support for the devadasi bill passed by Muthulakshmi Reddy.

== Death ==
Krishnan Nair died in 1938.

== Honours ==
In January 1930, Krishnan Nair was made a Knight Commander of the Order of the Indian Empire.
