= V. S. Subramanya Iyer =

Indian administrator

Diwan Bahadur V.S. Subrahmanya Iyer

Diwan of Travancore
- In office 1929–1932
- Monarch: Chithira Thirunal (Sethu Lakshmi Bayi as regent till 1931)
- Preceded by: M. E. Watts
- Succeeded by: T. Austin

Personal details
- Born: 21 October 1877 Travancore kingdom

Diwan Bahadur V. S. Subrahmanya Iyer (born 21 October 1877) was an Indian administrator who served as the Diwan of the princely state of Travancore from 1929 to 1932.

== Early life and career ==
Subrahmanya Iyer was born on 21 October 1877 to S.Vaidyanatha Iyer. He studied in St. Joseph's College and set up practice as an advocate in Travancore. He served as the Chief Justice of the High Court of Travancore before being appointed Diwan in 1929.

== Diwan of Travancore ==
Subrahmanya Iyer was appointed Diwan of Travancore in 1929 succeeding E. W. Watts. He served as Diwan till 1932 when he was succeeded by Thomas Austin I.C. S.

In 1930, Venkatarama Iyer was appointed Commissioner of Travancore Devaswom. In 1931, Subrahmanya Iyer had to deal with a students hartal in Travancore which followed the death of Motilal Nehru.

== Later life ==
Subrahmanya Iyer remained active in public life following his retirement as Diwan. On 25 November 1932, Sir C. P. Ramaswami Iyer, advisor to the Maharaja, appointed him President of the Committee to gauge public opinion before introducing the Temple Entry Proclamation. The other members of the Committee were Ulloor Parameswara Iyer, Mahadeva Iyer and Nambi Nilakanta Sarma. The commission interviewed people who were for as well as against temple entry and submitted a report strongly discouraging temple entry. However, Sir C. P. Ramaswami Iyer ignored the report and proceeded to introduce the landmark legislation.

In 1934, Subrahmanya Iyer became the president of the Kerala Hindu Mission. Upon the death of Rabindranath Tagore in 1941, a Kerala Tagore Academy was formed with Subrahmanya Iyer as its president.
