= M. E. Watts =

Indian lawyer, civil servant and administrator

Maurice Emygdius Watts

Dewan of Travancore
- In office 1925–1929
- Monarch: Sethu Lakshmi Bayi (as regent for Chithira Thirunal)
- Preceded by: T. Raghavaiah
- Succeeded by: V. S. Subramanya Iyer

Personal details
- Born: 18 June 1878 Travancore
- Died: 22 February 1933 (aged 54) London

Maurice Emygdius Watts (11 June 1878 – 22 February 1933) was an Indian lawyer, civil servant and administrator who served as the Diwan of Travancore from 1925 to 1929.

== Early life and education ==
Watts was born on 11 June 1878 to Frank Watts, Chief Secretary of the Government of Travancore. He had his early education in Madras and after graduating in law, entered the Madras provincial service in 1901.

== Death ==
Watts died on 22 February 1933 in London, aged 54. Watts Lane, in the Trivandrum suburb of Nanthancode, was named in the memory of the Watts family.

== Family ==
Watt's sister, Dorothia Henriett Watts, was a teacher who served as governess and tutor to the princesses of the royal family of Travancore. After India's independence in 1947, she settled down in Kotagiri in Nilgiris District, where she spent her last years.
