= Bismillah Khan (ruler) =

Nawab of Radhanpur (1874–1895)

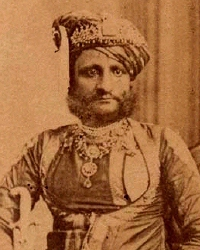
- Bismillah Khan

Nawab of Radhanpur
- Reign: 9 October 1874 – 19 December 1895
- Predecessor: Jorawar Khan
- Successor: Sher Khan II
- Born: 26 April 1843
- Died: 20 December 1895 (aged 52)
- Issue: Sher Khan II; Muhammad Jalaluddin Khan
- Dynasty: Babi
- Father: Jorawar Khan

Bismillah Khan (26 April 1843 – 20 December 1895) was Nawab of Radhanpur from 9 October 1874 until his death in 1895.

== Early life and family ==
Khan was born to Jorawar Khan, the Nawab of Radhanpur, on 26 April 1843. He married and had issue: two sons, Sher Khan II and Muhammad Jalaluddin Khan.

== Reign ==
Upon the death of his father on 9 October 1874, he succeeded to his title, rank and dignity. In 1879, he entered into an agreement with the British government, and by it agreed to stop smuggling, not sell opium below the British price, clear old stock, and submit half-yearly sales reports. However, he only accepted these terms on the condition that if any other state in Gujarat later got permission to grow opium, he would get the same right automatically. To mark the golden jubilee of Queen Victoria, he built a library called the Victoria Jubilee Institute. Khan also abolished all transit taxes in his state. These taxes had been bringing in about Rs. 100,000 each year. Khan had made major improvements in sanitation throughout his state. Khan also improved the morale of the public service by hiring educated people. He built new roads, established courts, municipalities, schools, post offices, and a dispensary in honour of his father. At this dispensary, people from all backgrounds received free medicine, and poor patients were also given food during their illness. Besides this one, he also opened several dispensaries across the state and established a hospital in Radhanpur. He also built Scott Canal, Bismillah Government Printing Press, a clock tower in Radhanpur, and a central jail. When Edward VII, as the Prince of Wales, visited India in 1875, Khan established, in the Prince's honour, an English school with a library attached to it in Radhanpur. Khan also paid him a visit in Mumbai and there received from him several presents: a Silver Chand (moon) with the motto honi soit qui mal y pense, which means "shame on the one who sees something bad in it", one English sword, a "choora" (knife), a solid gold ring, and portraits of the Prince and his consort. Khan attended the Delhi Durbar of 1877 and was given a flag there.

== Death ==
He died on 19 December 1895 and was succeeded by his son Sher Khan II.

== Titles and styles ==
Styles of Bismillah Khan
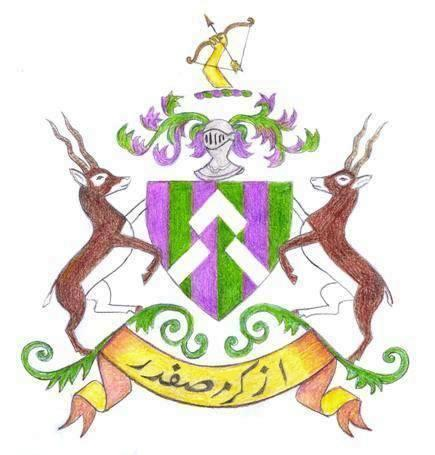
- Reference style: His Highness
- Spoken style: Your Highness

Khan held numerous titles starting from his birth, as the son of a Nawab of Radhanpur, and following his accession to his father's throne. Each is listed below; where two dates are shown, the first indicates the date of receiving the title, and the second indicates the date of its loss or renunciation:

- 26 April 1843 – 9 October 1874: Nawabzada Bismillah Khan Sahib of Radhanpur
- 19 December 1895 – 9 October 1874: His Highness Nawab Bismillah Khan Sahib Bahadur, Nawab of Radhanpur
