= V. P. Madhava Rao =

Indian statesman

Vishwanath Patankar Madhava Rao CIE
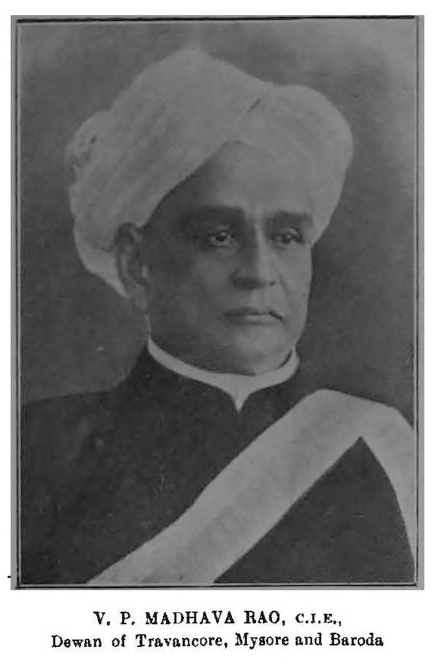
- Portrait of V. P. Madhava Rao

Dewan of Baroda
- In office 1910–1913

17th Dewan of Mysore
- In office 30 June 1906 – 31 March 1909
- Monarch: Krishna Raja Wadiyar IV
- Preceded by: P. N. Krishnamurti
- Succeeded by: T. Ananda Rao

Dewan of Travancore
- In office 1904–1906
- Monarch: Moolam Thirunal
- Preceded by: K. Krishnaswamy Rao
- Succeeded by: S. Gopalachari

Personal details
- Born: February 1850 Kumbakonam, Madras Presidency
- Died: 1934
- Profession: civil servant

Vishwanath Patankar Madhava Rao CIE Kaisar-i-Hind (10 February 1850 – 1934) was an Indian administrator and statesman who served as the Dewan of Travancore from 1904 to 1906, then as the 17th Dewan of Mysore from 1906 to 1909, and that of Baroda from 1910 to 1913.

== Early life ==
Madhava Rao was born in February 1850 in Kumbakonam, Madras Presidency into an ancient family of Thanjavur Marathi Deshastha Madhva Brahmin family, long ago settled in Tanjore, who were supposed to have emigrated from the Satara district to southern India in the wake of the Maratha conquest of Tanjore.

Rao was educated at Kumbakonam College with studies under William Archer Porter. He completed his Bachelor of Arts (B.A.) in 1869 and was appointed as a headmaster of the royal school at Mysore Palace.

== Appointments ==
Madhava Rao entered the service of the Kingdom of Mysore in 1869 as a headmaster of the royal school. He was later appointed public prosecutor of Mysore and served in the Judicial and Revenue departments. He also served as Inspector General of Police and later Plague Commissioner, Mysore Kingdom, from 1898 to 1901. Later, he served as Revenue Commissioner from 1902 to 1904 before being appointed Dewan in 1906.

== Dewan of Mysore ==
Rao served as the Dewan of Mysore from 30 June 1906 to 31 March 1909. In 1906, a bill was passed empowering members of the Mysore Legislative Assembly to pass laws. The new legislature was constituted on 6 March 1907. The Land Revenue Code was amended to make the Revenue Commissioner the chief revenue authority and was also given charge of the treasury. Department of Public Health was created and competitive exams for the Mysore Civil Services were revived. Taxes on arecanut were revoked.

Kindergarten schools were introduced in the kingdom and primary education was made free. A number of irrigation projects were undertaken. The Vani Vilas Dam was completed in 1906/1907 and the Cauvery Power Works at Belagola in 1907/1908. The government sanctioned a free grant of land to the Indian Institute of Science at Bangalore.

Electric lighting was introduced in the civil and military station of Bangalore city on 1 January 1908 and for all of Mysore city on 26 September 1908.

== Honours ==
Madhava Rao was made a Companion of the Order of the Indian Empire in 1899 and was awarded the Kaiser-i-Hind Medal in 1900.
