= P. Rajagopalachari =

Indian administrator

Sir Perungavur Rajagopalachari

Dewan of Cochin
- In office 1897–1901
- Monarch: Rama Varma XV
- Preceded by: V. Subramanya Pillai
- Succeeded by: L. Locke

Dewan of Travancore
- In office 26 October 1907 – 11 May 1914
- Monarch: Moolam Thirunal
- Preceded by: S. Gopalachari
- Succeeded by: M. Krishnan Nair

Member of Madras Legislative Council
- In office 1917–1927
- Governor: John Sinclair, 1st Baron Pentland, Lord Willingdon, George Goschen, 2nd Viscount Goschen

President of the Madras Legislative Council
- In office 1921–1923
- Prime Minister: A. Subbarayalu Reddiar, Raja of Panagal, P. Subbarayan
- Governor: Lord Willingdon, George Goschen, 2nd Viscount Goschen
- Preceded by: None
- Succeeded by: L. D. Swamikannu Pillai

Personal details
- Born: 18 March 1862
- Died: 1 December 1927 (aged 65)
- Party: Indian National Congress
- Education: Presidency College, Madras
- Occupation: lawyer, civil servant
- Profession: Sub-Collector, Statesman

Diwan Bahadur Sir Perungavur Rajagopalachari, KCSI, CIE (18 March 1862 – 1 December 1927), also spelt in contemporary records as Sir P. Rajagopala Achariyar, was an Indian administrator. He was the Diwan (Prime Minister) of Cochin State from December 1896 to August 1901 and of Travancore from 1906 to 1914.

== Early life and career ==
Rajagopalachari was born in Madras and educated at Presidency College and Madras Law College. He joined the Judicial Department Indian Civil Service on 3 May 1886 and was appointed deputy collector in December 1887. From 2 May 1890 to December 1896, he served as assistant collector and magistrate in Madras Province.

== Diwan of Cochin ==
In December 1896, Rajagopalachari was appointed Diwan by Maharaja Rama Varma of Cochin. He served in his capacity from 1896 to 1901. During his tenure as diwan, the Cochin Native Merchants Association was founded. This later became the Indian Chamber of Commerce and Industry - Cochin. In 1901, the Central Records of the Cochin State were established at Tripunithura. This later evolved into the Kerala State Archives Department.

== Diwan of Travancore ==
In 1901, he was appointed Registrar of Co-operative Credit Societies in the Madras Presidency and then served as Assistant Collector from March 1902 until 1906, when he was appointed Diwan of Travancore state.

The Sadhu Jana Paripalana Sangham was established in 1907 by social reformer Ayyankali to campaign for education for Scheduled Castes. Rajagopalachari was supportive of the movement, and in 1907 the government of Travancore passed an order for the admission of scheduled castes children in schools. However, the Namboothiri-Nair caste landlords who owned most of the schools were obstinate in allowing scheduled castes children into their schools and openly defied the government order. A major strike erupted. Scheduled caste agrarian workers refused to farm their fields. In 1910, Rajagopalachari and Mitchell, who headed the education department, made the order for admission of Scheduled Caste children public, thereby putting an end to the controversy.

Rajagopalachari also brought forth reforms in the administration. Scheduled Castes, who were previously excluded from the administration, were made eligible for nomination to the State Assembly. Ayyankali became the first Scheduled Caste member to be nominated to the Travancore State Assembly. Rajagopalachari also donated 8acres of land for the construction of an Islamic college by Sheikh Mohammad Hamadani Thangal.

Rajagopalachari's administration had its own share of controversies. M. A. Shakoor, in his biography of Vakkom Moulavi, calls Rajagopalachari's administration "authoritarian".

== Later life and career ==
In 1914, Rajagopalachari returned to Madras as Secretary of the Judicial Department, the first Indian to hold the post. In 1917, he was appointed to the Council of the Governor of Madras. When the Madras Legislative Council came into being, as per the provisions of the Government of India Act 1919, on 17 December 1920, Rajagopalachari was elected as the first President. It is believed that he was instrumental in formulating the no-confidence motion against the Justice Party Government of the Raja of Panagal. His tenure came to an end in 1923 and he was succeeded by L. D. Samikannu Pillai. In 1923, he was appointed to the Council of India in London, resigning in 1925 due to ill-health and returning to India.

== Honours ==
Rajagopalachari was appointed Companion of the Order of the Indian Empire (CIE) in 1909 and Knight Commander of the Order of the Star of India (KCSI) in the 1920 New Year Honours.

== Legacy ==
A bust of Rajagopalachari is present in the hall of the Madras Legislative Council.

== Family ==
Rajagopalachari had a brother P.Narasimhachari who was a Justice in High Court - Rangoon, Burma (Myanmar). He also had notable grand nephews (his sister's grandchildren) - C.T.Rajagopal, C.T.Venugopal and C.T.Krishnama Chari His son S Varadarajan Nayar was born on 28 October 1914 was a freedom fighter and the first mayor of Trivandrum (1947–48) post Indian independence and hoisted the Indian flag at the Corporation building for the first time. He was an editor, lawyer and politician. Varadarajan Nayar was also the minister for finance from 29-10-1978 to 07-10-1979. He was vice president, KPCC; president, DCC; attended ILO Conference in Geneva; joined INC in 1943; president, INTUC, KSRTC Workers Union, Sremic Congress. Died on 14-10-1989; Obituary made on 23-01-1990. He was survived by wife: Kamalamma; 2 sons, 3 daughters.

Other famous family members of Rajagopalachari: V Prathapachandran (Treasurer, Kerala Pradesh Congress Committee): Son of Varadarajan Nair and grandson of P. Rajagopalachary. Sangeetha Nair (Editor/Investigative Journalist): Grand daughter of Varadarajan Nair and Great Granddaughter of P. Rajagopalachary.

== Notes ==
Preceded by Subramanya Pillai	Diwan of Cochin; 1896–1901	Succeeded by L. Loka
Preceded by S. Gopalachari	Diwan of Travancore; 1906–1914	Succeeded by M. Krishnan Nair
