= Thomas Austin (civil servant) =

British civil servant of the Indian civil service and administrator

Sir Thomas Austin KCIE
- Austin in 1953.

Diwan of Travancore
- In office 1932–1934
- Monarch: Chithira Thirunal
- Preceded by: V. S. Subramanya Iyer
- Succeeded by: Muhammad Habibullah

Personal details
- Born: 20 July 1887 United Kingdom
- Died: 1976 (age 89) United Kingdom

Sir Thomas Austin, KCIE (20 July 1887 – 27 June 1976) was a British civil servant of the Indian civil service and administrator who served as the Diwan of Travancore from 1932 to 1934.

== Early life ==
Thomas Austin was born in 1887 to a British clergyman, Rev. T. Austin. He was educated at Plymouth College and Jesus College, Cambridge.

== Indian civil service ==
Thomas Austin entered the Indian Civil Service in 1910 and served in various junior positions before being appointed District Collector of Nilgiris in 1929. He served as Collector of Nilgiris from 1929 to 1932 when he was appointed the Diwan of Travancore on a two-year contract. In his later life, Austin also served as Chief Secretary of the Government of Madras.

== Honours ==
Austin was made a Knight Commander of the Order of the Indian Empire in the 1945 New Year Honours.

Austin Town in the city of Bangalore, India is named after Thomas Austin who had built houses for low-income groups in the Cantonment section of the city.
