= Bharani Thirunal Lakshmi Bayi =

Indian princess, Rani of Travancore

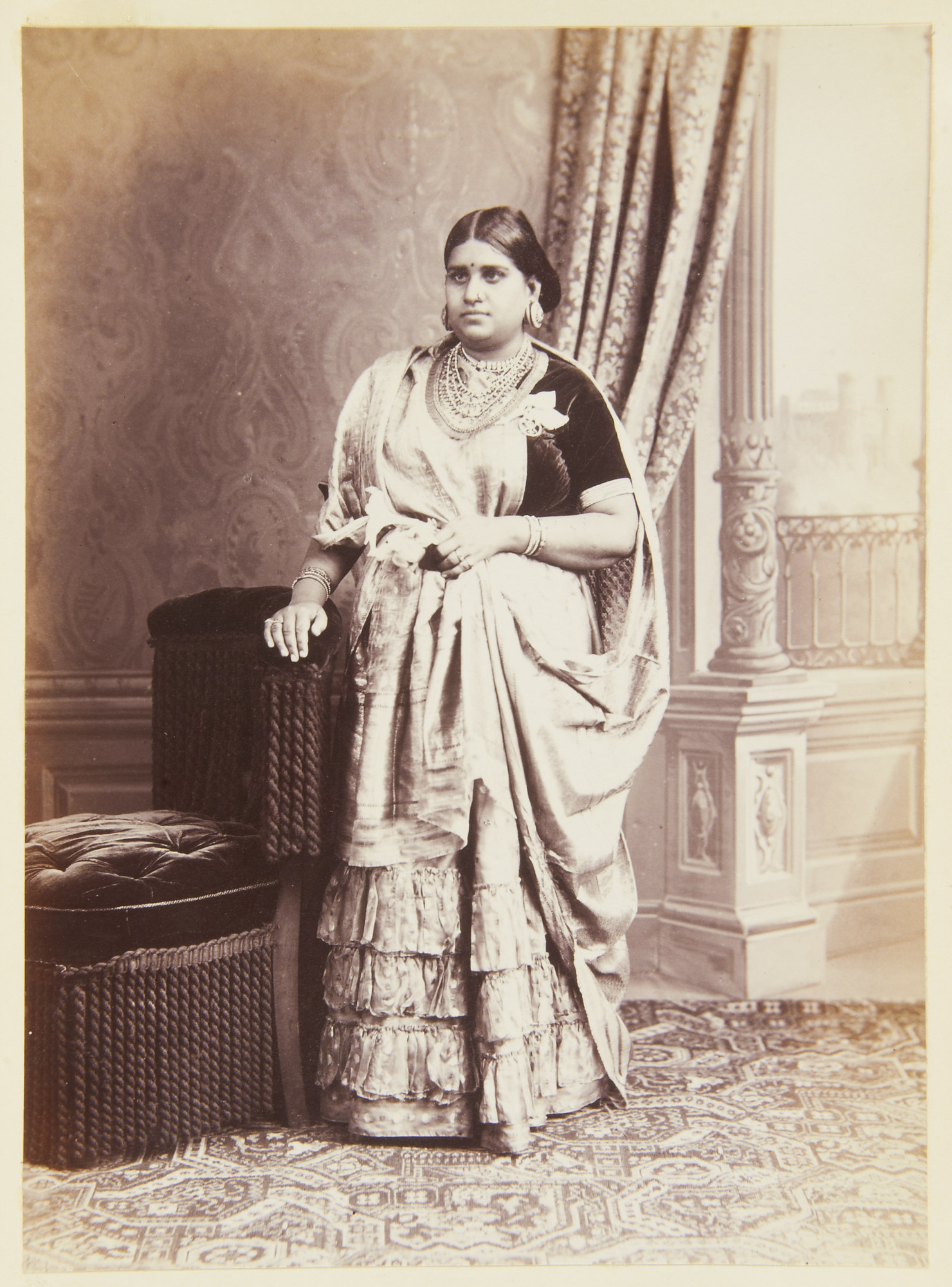
- The Maharani circa 1885

Maharani of Travancore
- Reign: 1857 December to 1901 June
- Predecessor: Pooradam Thirunal Lakshmi Bayi
- Successor: HH Maharani Pooradam Thirunal Sethu Lakshmi Bayi
- Born: 1848
- Died: 1901 (aged 52–53)
- Spouse: Kerala Varma Valiya Koil Thampuran
- Issue: HH Maharani Pooradam Thirunal Sethu Lakshmi Bayi, Elaya Thampuratti; Moolam Thirunal Sethu Parvathi Bayi; (Adopted)
- Religion: Hinduism

Maharani Bharani Thirunal Lakshmi Bayi CI (c. 1848–1901) was the Senior Rani of Travancore from 1857 till her death in 1901. Her consort was the famous poet and writer, styled the father of Malayalam literature, Sri Kerala Varma Valiya Koil Thampuran.

== Early life ==
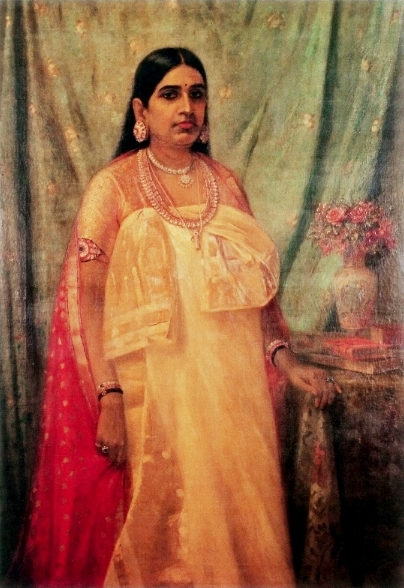
Lakshmi Bayi of Travancore

Lakshmi Bayi was born in about 1848 as the daughter of Bharani Nal Amma Thampuran of Mavelikara. Her mother's family was a branch of the Kolathunad royal family which was directly related to the Travancore Royal Family. The family had settled in Travancore towards the end of the 18th century when Tipu Sultan invaded their territories in Malabar. While some members of the Kolathunad family returned, three sisters stayed back in Travancore and established the royal houses of Mavelikara, Ennakkad and Prayikkara.

In 1857 the then Rani of Travancore, HH Pooradam Thirunal Lakshmi Bayi, the niece of Maharajah Uthram Thirunal died soon after giving birth to a son, the later Maharajah Moolam Thirunal. The royal family followed the Marumakkathayam system of matrilineal succession and the death of the Rani threatened the perpetuation of the dynasty. Thus, as in the previous five such incidents, it was decided to adopt from the Kolathunad family. Since members of the family were resident within Travancore the choice was made from amongst them. The Maharajah decided to adopt the two eldest daughters of Bharani Thirunal Amma Thampuran of Mavelikara namely Lakshmi Bayi (b. 1848) and her younger sister Parvathi Bayi (b. 1850).

== Adoption and marriage ==
In November 1857 the adoption was sanctioned by the Paramount power and the two girls were adopted into the royal family and installed as the Senior and Junior Ranis of Attingal, the traditional position held by females of the Travancore family. Lakshmi Bayi now became HH Rani Bharani Thirunal Lakshmi Bayi. In 1859 three suitable boys from chosen families were presented to her, including the famous artist Raja Ravi Varma. The Rani picked the brother of the Rajah of Parappanad, whose family had also settled in Travancore at Changanassery, namely Kerala Varma Valiya Koil Thampuran. Raja Ravi Varma later went on to marry her youngest sister Bhageerathi Amma Thampuran of Mavelikara.

The marriage of the Rani and Kerala Varma was very happy in all respects, except that they were childless. In 1860 Uthram Thirunal died and his nephew, the Rani's adoptive uncle, Maharajah Ayilyam Thirunal succeeded to the musnud. Both Ayilyam Thirunal and his brother Visakham Thirunal were initially close to Kerala Varma. However sometime into the 1870s there occurred a palace conspiracy, involving Visakham Thirunal, Kerala Varma and the Dewan T. Madhava Rao and the three got alienated from the Maharajah. Matters took a turn for the worse when, with the sanction of the Paramount Power, who were apprised of facts, Kerala Varma was arrested by the Maharajah in 1875 and imprisoned at Alapuzha in north Travancore. After two years he was placed under house arrest at his family home in Haripad.

== Separation ==
The Rani's entreaties to the Maharajah to forgive her husband were met with no sympathy. When she asked for his release it was refused and so she proposed to go with him. But the Maharajah refused to permit this and constrained her in her palace. At the same time from all quarters she was pressurized to leave Kerala Varma and accept a new consort. The Rani, however, completely refused in absolute terms to even listen to any such suggestion. In order to compel her to give up her marriage, her allowances were cut off by the Maharajah. The Rani however refused to budge and somehow managed her basic expenses with loans taken from influential people of Trivandrum. The support of the crown prince (the future Visakham Thirunal) was also a relief for her.

In 1880, Maharajah Ayilyam Thirunal died and was succeeded by Visakham Thirunal. He immediately ordered the release of Kerala Varma. Thus, after a period of five years, the Rani was reunited with her husband. In gratitude to the Maharajah, Kerala Varma wrote the Visakhavijaya. He also authored the famous masterpiece Mayura Sandesam (the peacock messenger), the theme of which is the separation between his wife and himself.

When the Rani's strong will and refusal to abandon her husband, amidst all pressures and tribulations, reached the ears of Queen Victoria, she admitted her in 1881 into the Order of the Crown of India. Kerala Varma Valiya Koil Thampuran was later in 1895 decorated with the Order of the Star of India. The remaining years of the Rani's life with her husband were happy, marred only by their childlessness and the deaths of her nephews. Her sister, the Junior Rani Parvathi Bayi, had four sons and one daughter. The daughter died within months of her birth and two of the four sons were also dead by 1895. The Junior Rani also died in 1893, and once again the royal family faced the problem of a succession crisis due to the absence of female members to continue the line after Rani Lakshmi Bayi.

== Heirs ==
The Rani now looked upon her nieces, the children of her youngest sister by the artist Raja Ravi Varma to bring forth girls who could be adopted into the ruling line. For this purpose she went on a pilgrimage of Sethusamudram in 1894 accompanied by her nieces. In 1895 her elder niece, Ayilyam Nal Mahaprabha Thampuran gave birth to a daughter Sethu Lakshmi Bayi and the next year her younger niece, Thiruvadira Nal Kochukunji Thampuran gave birth to Sethu Parvathi Bayi. In 1900 the Rani officially petitioned her adoptive brother, Maharajah Moolam Thirunal, who ascended the musnud after the death of Visakham Thirunal in 1885 and accordingly the two girls were adopted and installed as Junior Rani and first princess of Attingal respectively. The Rani was very attached to the children. The elder one would in 1924 become Regent of Travancore while the son of the younger one would be the last Maharajah of Travancore, Chithira Thirunal Balarama Varma.

== Description by a traveller ==
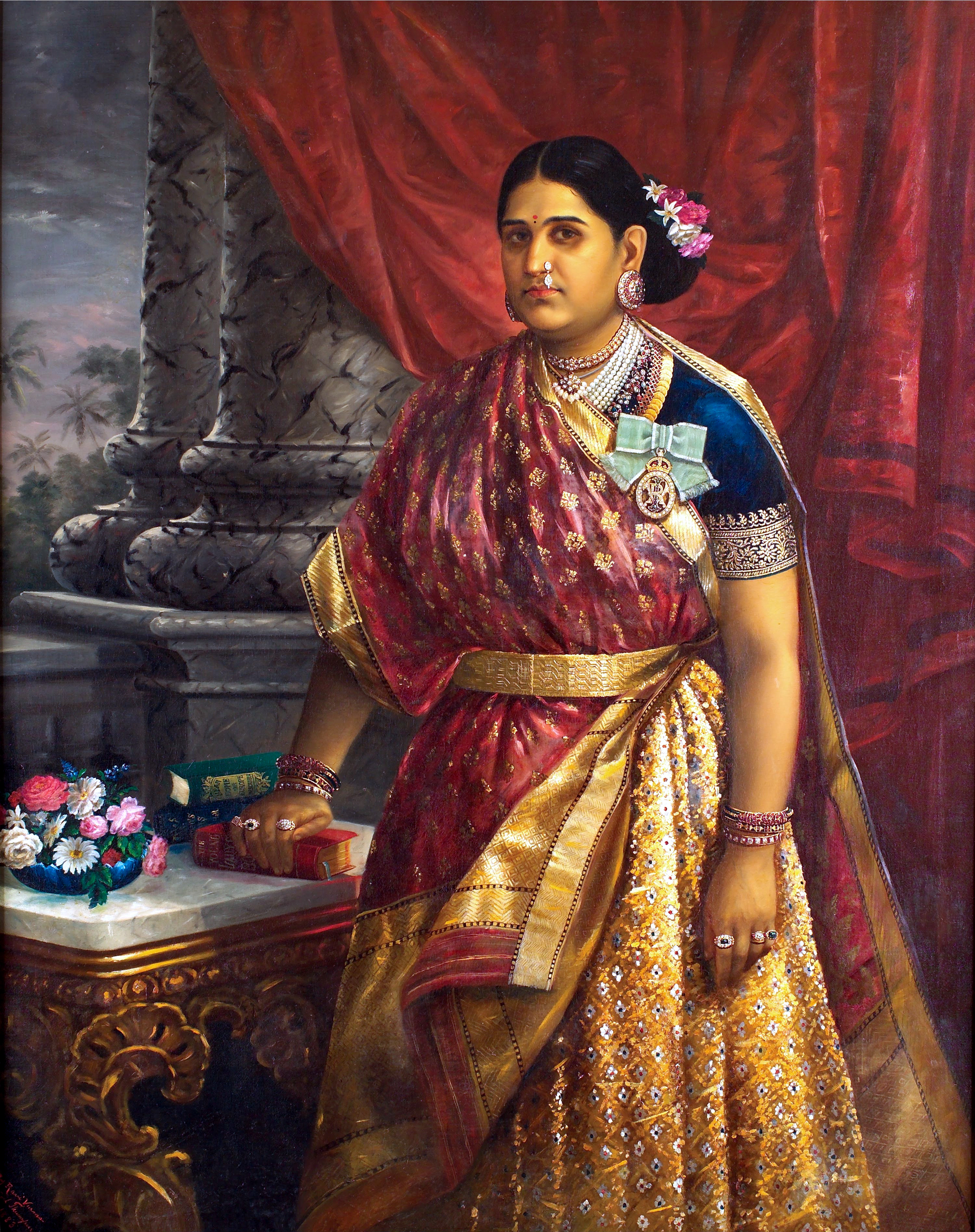
Painting of The Maharani by Raja Ravi Varma

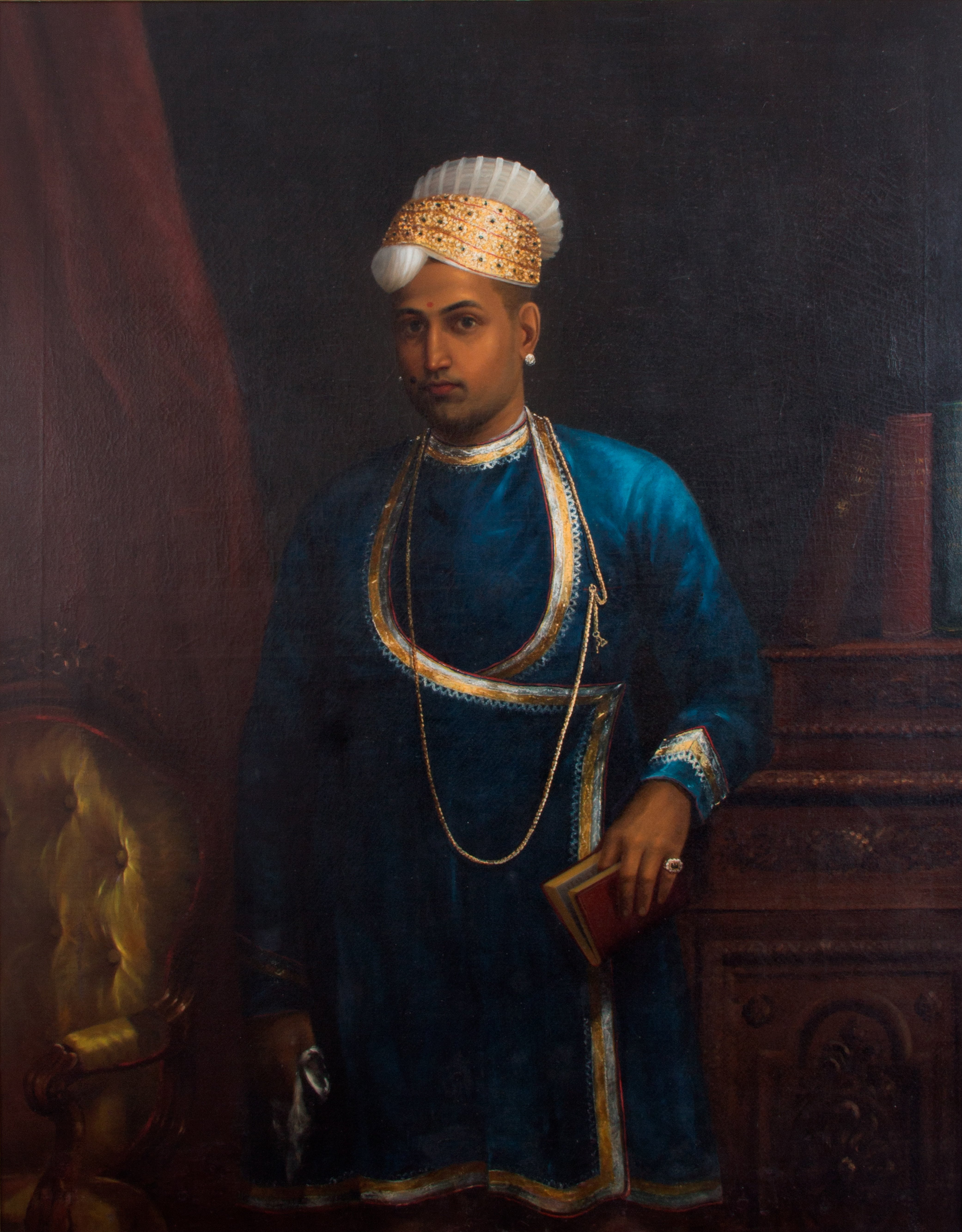
Painting of Kerala Varma Valiya Koil Thampuran

Pierre Loti during his visit to Travancore in the year 1900 described the "Maharanee" thus:

The Queen holds her receptions in a room on the first floor... but she herself in national costume, looks like a charming personification of India. She has a regular profile, pure features and magnificent large eyes, in fact all the beauty of her race. In accordance with the tradition of the Nayar family her jet black hair is wound round her forehead. Enormous rings of diamonds and rubies hang from her earlobes and her naked arms, which are much bejeweled, are unconcealed by her velvet bodice... Oh! it is easy to imagine the degree of refinement to which a noble lady of sovereign race may attain in this country where even the lower classes are cultured, but the especial charm of the Maharanee lies in her benevolence and in a reserved and gentle sweetness... so before leaving I seek to impress her image on my mind, for her face does not seem to belong to our times, and it is only in old Indian miniatures that I have had a glimpse of such princesses.

== Death ==
In October 1900 the late Junior Rani's youngest son, Prince Aswathy Thirunal Marthanda Varma died causing much pain to the Rani. On 6 June 1901 the heir apparent and only surviving son of the late Junior Rani, Elayarajah Chathayam Thirunal Rama Varma died as well. The Rani was by then too ill to even grieve, as her husband noted in his diary. She died on 15 June 1901, barely a week after her nephew's death. As her husband noted in his diary that night,

My angel, my life, my darling, my all and all, my love, my pride, my idol, my sweetheart- alas! and what not- expired quietly at 8 pm.

== Full title ==
Her Highness Sri Padmanabha Sevini Vanchi Dharma Vardhini Raja Rajeshwari Rani Bharani Thirunal Lakshmi Bayi, Attingal Mootha Thampuran, Companion of the Order of the Crown of India.

== See also ==
- Kolathunad
- Mavelikara
- Attingal
- Travancore Royal Family
- Moolam Thirunal
- Sethu Lakshmi Bayi
- Kerala Varma Valiya Koil Thampuran

== Sources ==
- Travancore State Manual Vol II (1906) by V. Nagam Aiya
- Travancore State Manual Vol II (1940) by TK Velu Pillai
- Visakhavijaya: a study by Ramakrishna Pillai
- At the turn of the tide by Dr. Lakshmi Raghunandan
- India by Pierre Loti
