= Bharani Thirunal Parvathi Bayi =

Junior Rani of Travancore (born 1850)

Parvathi Bayi
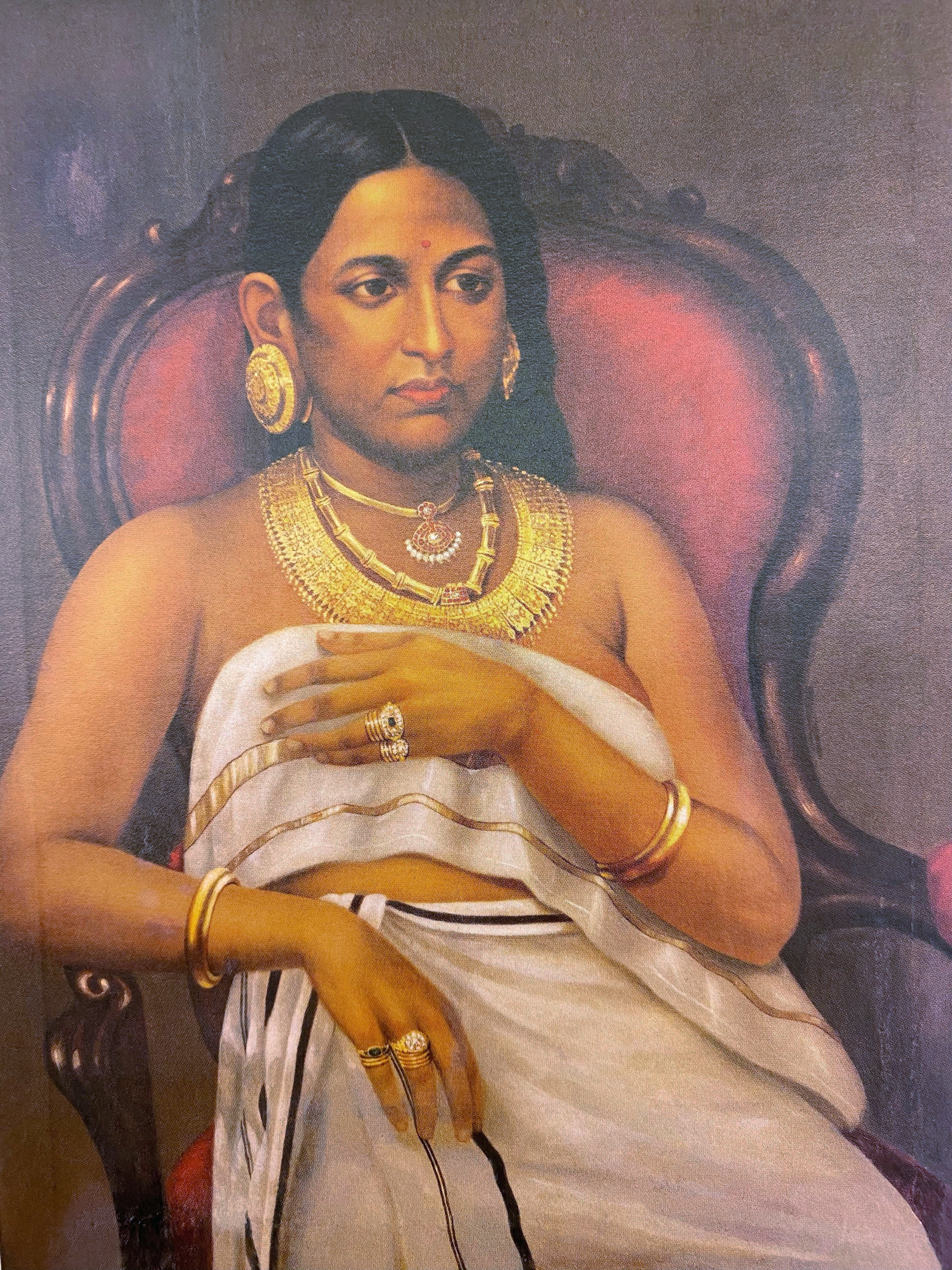
- Junior Rani of Attingal Painted by Raja Ravi Varma

Junior Maharani of Travancore
- Reign: 1857-1893
- Coronation: 1857 December
- Predecessor: Pooradam Thirunal Lakshmi Bayi (Mother of Sree Moolam Thirunal)
- Successor: Sethu Lakshmi Bayi
- Born: 1850; Mavelikara
- Died: Unknown
- Spouse: Kilimanur Kerala Varma Koil Thampuran
- Religion: Hinduism

Rani Bharani Thirunal Parvathi Bayi (born 1850) was a junior Rani of Travancore as known as ' Attingal Elaya Rani ' Her consort was Kilimanoor Kerala Varma Koyi Thampuran. Parvathi Bayi was born in 1850 as the daughter of Bharani Thirunal Amma Thampuran of Utsava Madom Palace in Mavelikara.

== Adoption ==
In the year 1857, the problem facing Maharajah Uthram Thirunal Marthanda Varma of Travancore was of severe gravity. His sister Maharani Gowri Rugmnini Bayi's daughter Rani Pooradam Thirunal Lakshmi Bayi had died 11 days after giving birth to a Prince Moolam Thirunal. Pooradom Thirunal Lakshmi Bayi had an elder son, Hastham Thirunal. As in the past cases, adoption would be the only recourse for the perpetuation of the royal line and the Maharajah wrote thus to the Paramount Power. In the month of November 1857 the adoption was sanctioned by the Paramount power and the two girls were adopted into the royal family and installed as the Senior and Junior Ranis of Attingal from Mavelikara Uthsava Madom Palace.

== As Junior Rani, Marriage ==
After adoption in 1857, Rani Lakshmi Bayi (age 8) had been installed as Attingal Maharani (Queen of Travancore) and her sister Rani Parvathi Bayi became Junior Rani (Attingal Elaya Rani) at the age of six. After two years in 1859 the Maharajah Uthram Thirunal Marthanda Varma decided to get the Ranies married and three young suitors were presented to them. One of them was Kerala Varma of Changanassery, Lakshmipuram Palace the grandnephew of the Raja Raja Varma Koil Thampuran. The second was Kerala Varma from Kilimanoor Palace while the third was a Ravi Varma, also from Kilimanoor Palace. Rani Parvathi Bayi chose the Kerala Varma Koil Thampuran from Kilimanoor Palace and her elder sister Rani Lakshmi Bayi had selected the Kerala Varma of Changanassery Palace. Raja Ravi Varma was married to Bhageerathi Thampuratti from Mavelikara Uthsava Madom Palace.
