= Satelmond Palace =

Palace of Kingdom of Travancore, Thiruvananthapuram

Coordinates: 8.4880650°N 76.9775870°E

Satelmond Palace in Thiruvananthapuram, Kerala, India is one of the palaces that belonged to the Travancore Royal Family. It is situated in the Poojapura ward of Thiruvananthapuram city. Originally known as Vijaya Vilasam (roughly translated as "the Place of Victory"), it later became known as Satelmond Palace. It was the official residence of Sethu Lakshmi Bayi during her regency. During the late 1970s, it was gifted by the royal family to the Sree Chitra Tirunal Institute for Medical Sciences and Technology, which started its biomedical technology wing there. The queen's portrait still hangs in the hallway at the entrance of the main building.

== Construction ==
Satelmond Palace is two-storeyed, featuring massive pillars at the entrance, intricate etchings, statues of majestic lions, floors with elaborate patterns, circular wooden staircases, and slanting roofs with grooved terracotta tiles.

== See also ==
- Travancore Royal Family
- Princely State
- Poojapura
