= Travancore royal family =

Ruling family of Travancore

House of Travancore
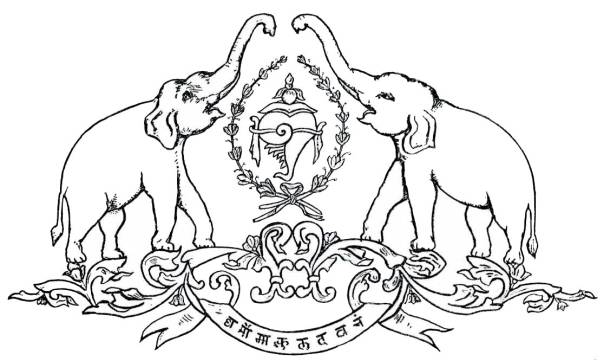
- Parent house: Venad dynasty
- Country: Travancore
- Current region: Kerala, Tamil Nadu
- Founded: 1729
- Founder: Marthanda Varma I
- Final ruler: Sree Chithira Thirunal Balarama Varma
- Titles: Maharaja of Travancore
- Deposition: 1949

The Travancore royal family was the ruling house of the Kingdom of Travancore. They signed a treaty with the British in 1788, thereby adopting British dominance. Later, in 1805, they revised the treaty, leading to a diminution of royal authority and the loss of political independence for Travancore. They had to give up their ruling rights over the common people in 1949 when Travancore was merged with Independent India and their political pension privileges and royal titles were abolished in 1971 according to the Constitution of India.

The royal family was alternatively known as the Kupaka Swaroopam, Thripappur Swaroopam, Venad Swaroopam, Vanchi Swaroopam etc. It has its seat today at Thiruvananthapuram in Kerala, India. In the 18th century CE, the Travancore royal family adopted some members from the royal family of Kolathunadu based at Kannur, and Parappanad based in present-day Malappuram district.

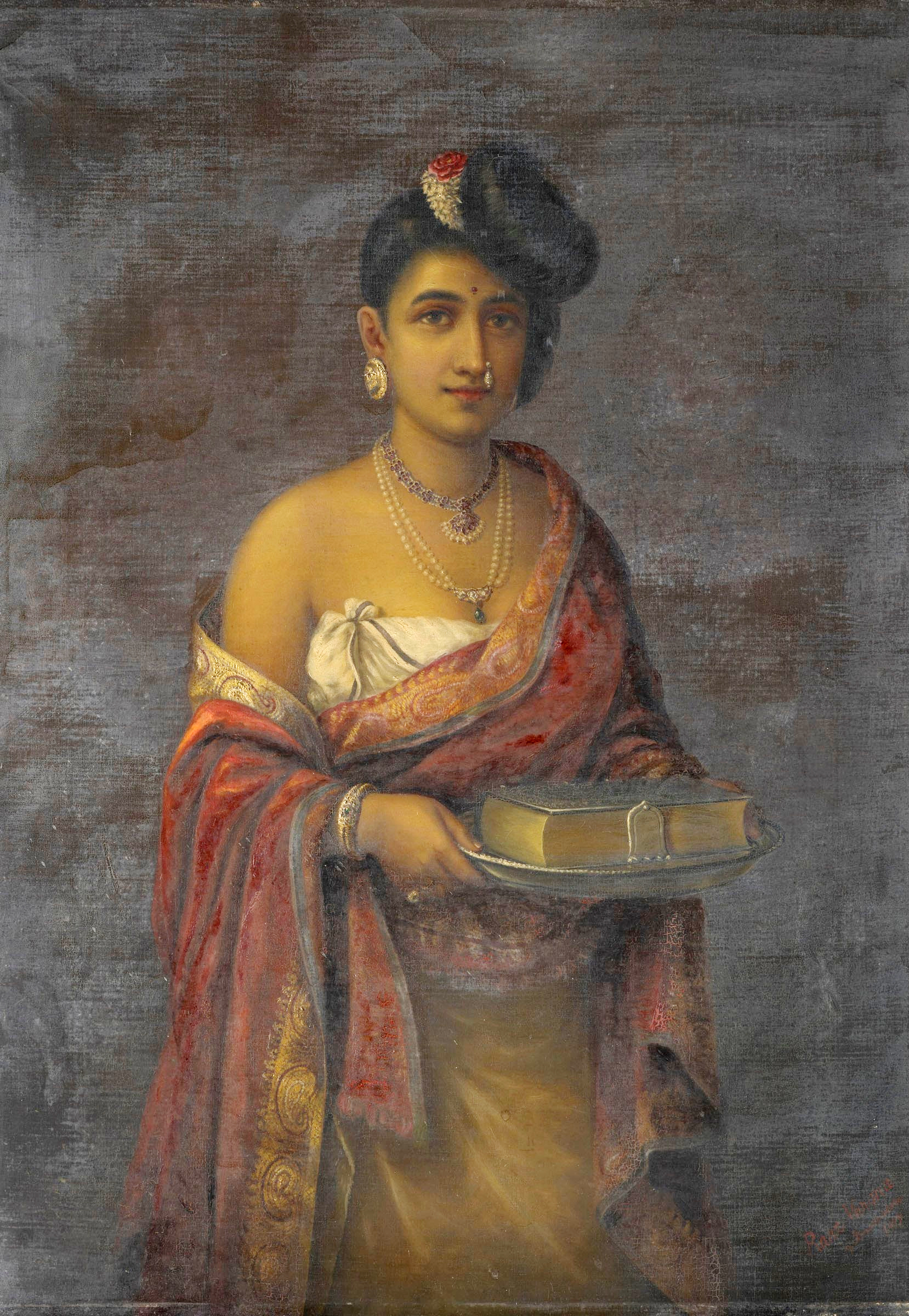
The Maharani of Travancore - Painting by Raja Ravi Varma (1848–1906)

== History and legends of the dynasty ==
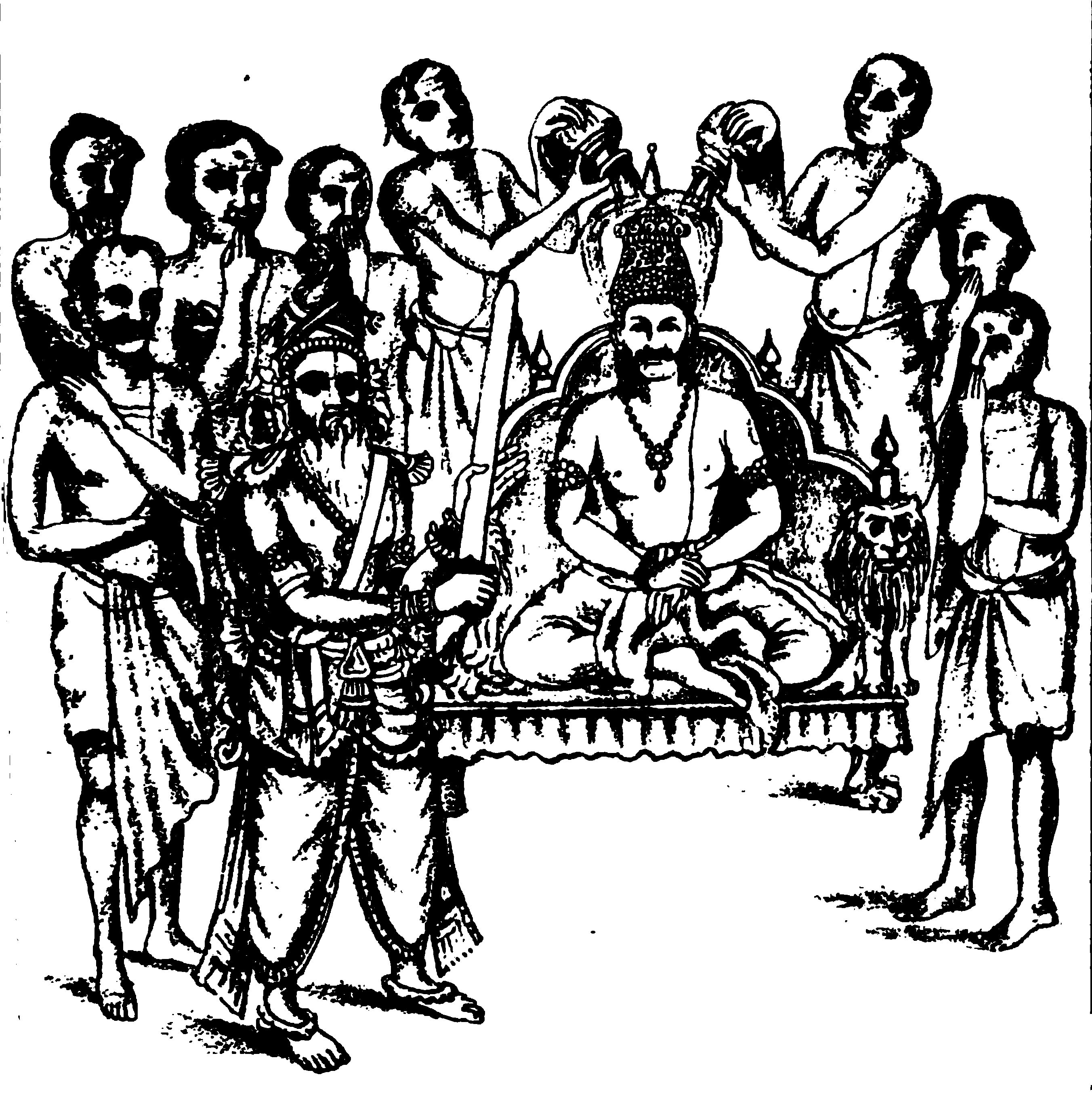
Installation of Bhanu Virama as King of Kerala by Parashurama

The family descends from ancient Nairs. The first recorded inscription of the Venad chiefdom that later became Travancore is in the copper-plate grants of land and privileges on Jewish and Christian tradesmen. The grants were made by the rulers of Kerala, the Perumal Viceroys of South Indian Kingdoms of the West Coast who were deputed to rule Kerala and witnessed by Nair Chiefs including the then Chief of Venad.

In the beginning, when aristocratic lineages rose to power, as in the case of a small group broken away from its earlier tharavad through conquest, when they acquired office, these groups seem to have severed ties with their former lineages and clans and conferred on themselves a higher ritual rank as independent castes. These myths are likely to have been created to add to the family enhancement of the dynasty.

According to existing myths, the founding members of the Travancore royal family are said to have come to Kerala, from the banks of the Narmada river. Another claim is that Parashurama himself crowned the first official ruler in the dynasty. There is a claim that their history can be traced back to 820 C.E, which is based on the claim of descent from the Later Cheras of the three southern Indian Mandala Kingdoms namely Chera Mandalam, Pandya Mandalam and Chola Mandalam. According to another legend, a branch of the Chera family was sent to the extreme north of the Kerala region, where they settled and came to be known as the Mooshika royal family, or the later Kolathiris, while another branch was deputed to go south to grapple with the Pandyan invasions.

One of the two branches of the Chera dynasty shifted to Venad / Quilon where it merged with the Ay kingdom. Sangramadhira Ravivarman Kulaśēkhara (1266–1314) was the most famed ruler of this Chera Ay dynasty. Numerous places are named after this Chera-Ay dynasty. Ravi Varman invaded the territories of the Pandyas and Cholas and performed imperial coronations at Madurai and Kanchipuram and thus threw off the Pandyan hegemony in the region. However his success was short lived and after him his successors could not hold on to these acquisitions of the Pandyas and Cholas.

Sangramadhira Ravivarman Kulaśēkhara adopted two princesses from the related Kolathiri dynasty called Attingal and Kunnumel Ranis in 1305 C.E. The line of kings after Ravi Varman followed the Marumakkathayam law of matrilineal succession. The royal family continued thus in the female line. Whenever there were no females to take forth the line, princesses were adopted from the Kolathiri family, the latest adoption being in 1994. Umayamma Rani who reigned towards the end of the 17th century was a prominent ruler. Marthanda Varma, the "maker of modern Travancore" and Dharma Raja were powerful rulers who re-established the power of monarchy in the state and destroyed that of the nobles. By the early 19th century the kingdom became a princely state under the British. The British government accorded the Maharajah of Travancore a high 19 gun salute outside Travancore, whereas locally and for all temple festivals, the highest salute of 21 guns were fired. Swathi Thirunal was one of the most popular rulers of the 19th century. He made contributions both in the field of administration as well as music. During the reign of Chithira Thirunal Balarama Varma reforms like the Temple Entry Proclamation were brought about. He was referred to as the Father of Travancore industrialization by A. Sreedhara Menon. V. P. Menon in his book stated that, under Chithira Thirunal's reign, Travancore had become the second most prosperous Princely State in the British Empire.

== Merger of Attingal ==
The women of the family were popularly referred to as Attingal Queens. Attingal was also considered as the ancestral homes of Travancorean royals. Historians like V. Nagam Ayya, A. Sreedhara Menon etc. say that Attingal was never a separate kingdom but the estates and provinces given to the royal women by the male head of the family (King). As the Kings of Travancore were the sons of Attingal Queens, the latter were held in high respect by the royal family as well as the public. This respect and high status led to the wrong notion that Attingal Queens were once sovereigns which was further compounded by the writings of many foreign historians and travellers. Even if they had any power, it was taken away by Maharajah Sree Anizham Thirunal Veerabaala Marthanda Varma. Many Attingal Queens misused their status and signed potentially dangerous treaties with foreign forces, without even consulting the reigning Travancore Kings. Maharajah Sree Anizham Thirunal Marthanda Varma, anticipating the threat to the Kingdom's security, removed the powers of the Attingal Queens permanently and brought them under the complete control of the King. Thus, the Attingal Queens lost all private rights in the family properties, their power limited to the role of just a supervisor of such properties.

Kerala historian, Prof. A. Sreedhara Menon wrote: "Early in his reign Marthanda Varma assumed direct control over the so-called Attingal 'Queendom.' This was not an annexation or conquest, but "the amalgamation of Travancore with Attingal." The theory that the Ranis of Attingal exercised sovereign powers is incorrect. The fact is that in political matters, the Ranis exercised no sovereign rights. Any grant of rights over immovable property by the Ranis required the King's previous assent or subsequent confirmation for its validity. The so-called Queendom of Attingal had its origin in the 5th century when two Princesses were adopted into the Venad family and the revenues from certain estates in and around Attingal were assigned to them. Since then, the female members of the ruling family of Travancore had come to be known as Attingal Ranis. It was only the male children of these Tamburatties who could inherit the throne. When Marthanda Varma decided to assume direct control over the estates of Attingal, he was not interfering in the affairs of a sovereign State. As the head of the royal family and the ruler of the State, he had every right to interfere in the affairs of a part of his kingdom. The Rani had neither territory nor subjects. What she possessed was nothing more than the control over the revenues of the estates, powers she exercised were delegated to her by the sovereign of the State."

== Thrippadidaanam and Sree Padmanabhadasa ==
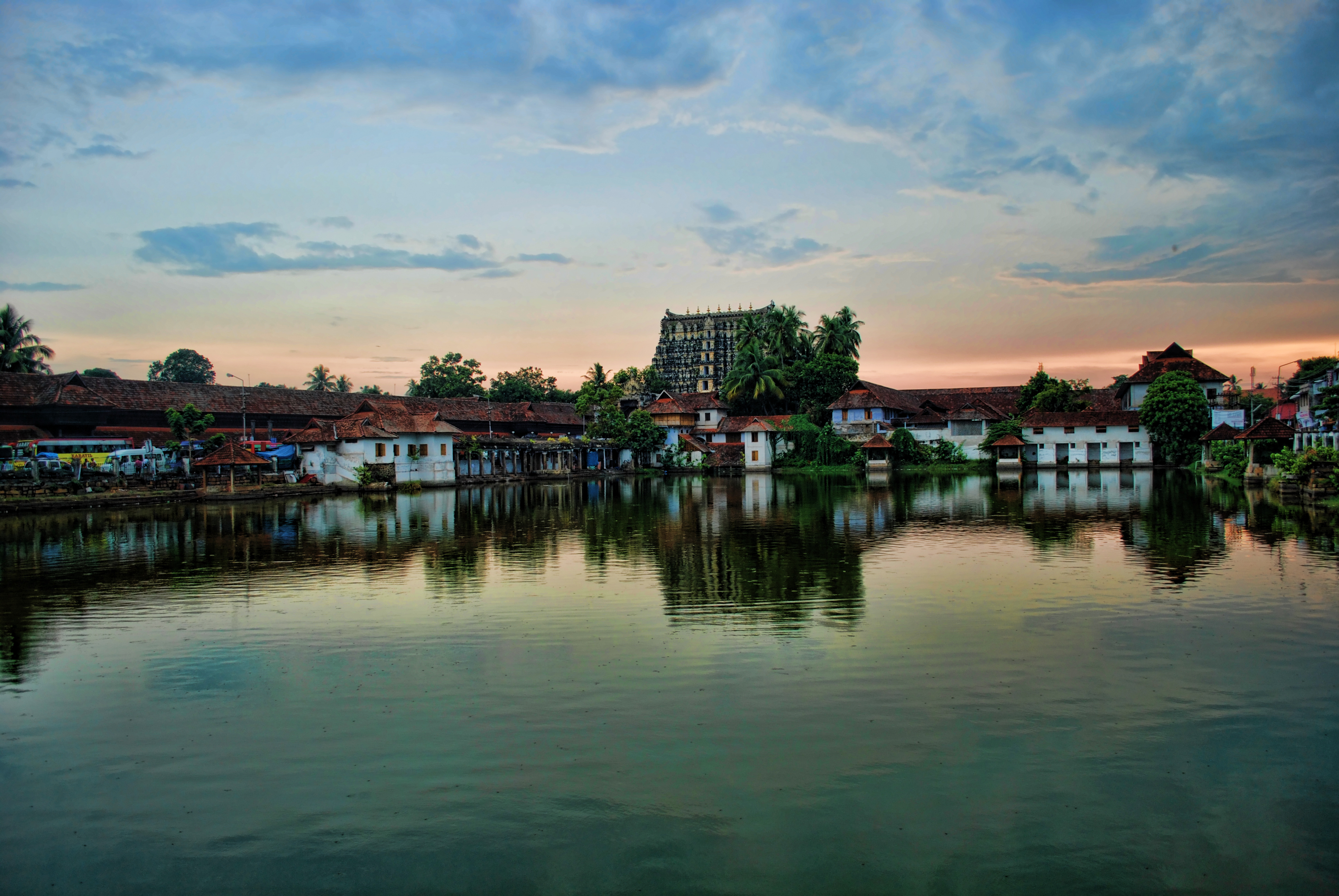
Padmanabhaswamy Temple dedicated to the patron deity of the family

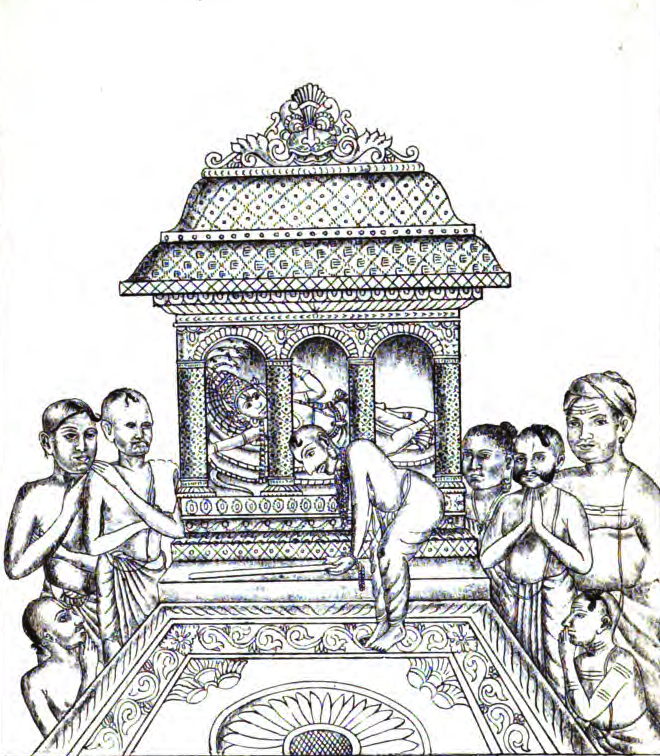
Maharaja Marthanda Varma ritually donating the kingdom to Padmanabhaswamy

Maharajah Sree Anizham Thirunal dedicated the Kingdom of Travancore to his family deity Sri Padmanabhaswamy on 3 January 1750 and after that he was referred to as Sree Padmanabhadasa Vanchipaala Maharajah Sree Anizham Thirunal Veerabaala Marthanda Varma Kulasekharaperumal. The Kings of Travancore, taking the title of "Sree Padmanabhadasa," ruled the kingdom as the servant of that deity. This important donation of the Kingdom to the Temple was known as "Thripadidaanam." Travancore as a whole, thus became the property of Sri Padmanabhaswamy, the deity of the Travancore royal family or in other words "God's Own Country." It is erroneously believed that use of the title "Sree Padmanabhadasa" before royal male members' names came into being after Thrippadidaanam, but this title was in use even in the 16th century. During the first birthday ceremony of Maharajah Karthika Thirunal Rama Varma (Dharmaraja) in 1725, he is referred to as "Sree Padmanabhadasa" which was much before the Thrippadidaanam (1750) by Maharajah Anizham Thirunal Veerabaala Marthanda Varma. The title of "Sree Padmanabhadasa" is prefixed to the name of every Travancore King while the royal women are "Sree Padmanabhasevinis." In order to get the eligibility for attaining the title of "Sree Padmanabhadasa," certain rituals must be completed at the birth of new royal male members. On the first birthday of every royal male members would be put on the 'Ottakkalmandapam' of the Sree Padmanabhaswami Temple and holy water from the temple will be sprinkled on the baby and only after completion of this ceremony, the royal child is proclaimed as "Sree Padmanabhadasa." The female members also have a ritual called "Padiyettam" which is conducted only after their "Pallikettu" (wedding of Travancore Princesses and Queens). Only those male and female members who complete these ceremonies are allowed in the temple affairs and are also provided respect as well as the titles associated with temple as well as the royal family.'

== Adoption ==
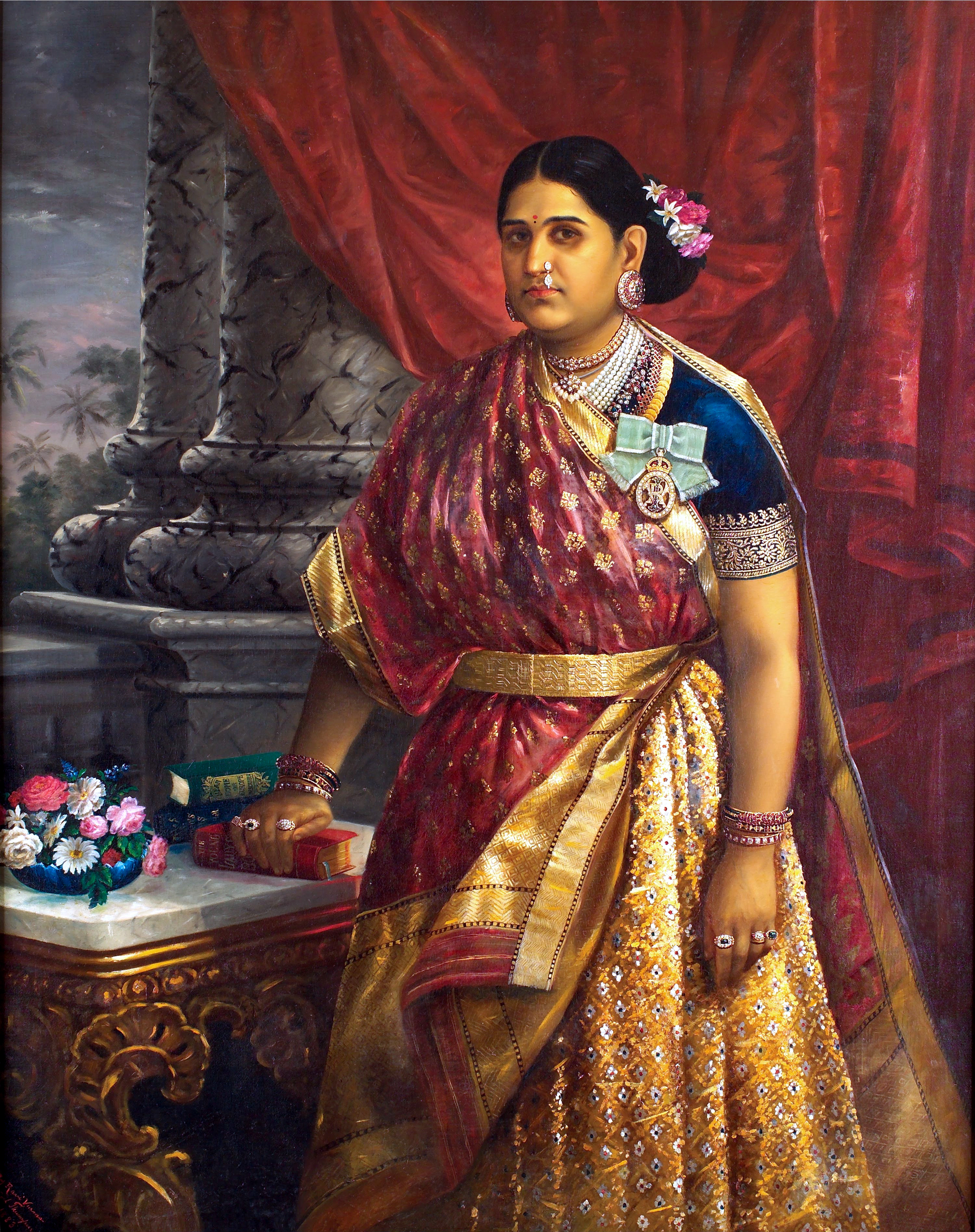
Maharani Bharani Thirunal Lakshmi Bayi was adopted from the related Kolathiri royal family

The females members of the royal family by blood or adoption are styled as the "Queens of Attingal" with the titles of Attingal Mootha Thampurati (Senior Queen of Attingal), Attingal Elaya Thampurati (Junior Queen of Attingal) and Attingal Kochu Thampurati (First Princess of Attingal). The first adoption to the Travancore royal family was in the early 14th century from the Kolathiri family because the Kolathiris are considered a sister dynasty by the Travancore Royalty. This adoption resulted in the branching of the royal family into four families namely the branch at Thiruvananthapuram, another at Kottarakara known as Elayadathu Swaroopam, the Peraka Thavazhi branch of Nedumangad and the Quilon branch. The later two branches died out into the 18th century whereas the last Rani of Kottarakara fled after battle with Maharajah Anizham Thirunal Marthanda Varma. In 1630 two males were adopted from the Cochin royal family sowing the seed of dissension between the branches of the royal family. Later in 1684 one male and two females were adopted from the Kolathiri family, from which family all subsequent adoptions were made, by Umayamma Rani. In 1688 two males, including Rajah Rama Varma, and 2 females were adopted and the famous Travancore King Anizham Thirunal Marthanda Varma was born to one of these princesses. In 1718 a princess was adopted, whose son was the later King Karthika Thirunal Rama Varma Dharma Raja. In 1748 again four princesses were adopted and Balarama Varma (1798–1810) belonged to this line. The next adoption of 1788 brought forth the famous Maharanis, Gowri Lakshmi Bayi and Gowri Parvati Bayi and all the male rulers up to 1924, the last ruler in this line being Maharajah Moolam Thirunal.

In 1857, two princesses, including Rani Lakshmi Bayi, were adopted from a branch of the Kolathiri family residing at Mavelikara since the 1790s, but by 1901 both these princesses and all their issue died. These adoptions were against the Travancore laws of succession. In 1900 again two princesses were adopted from Mavelikara, granddaughters of Raja Ravi Varma, Sethu Lakshmi Bayi and Sethu Parvathi Bayi (gave birth to the last ruling monarch of Travancore, Sree Chithira Thirunal Balarama Varma).

The latest adoption occurred in 1994 by Princess Aswathi Thirunal Gowri Lakshmi Bayi who adopted a princess named Lekha Parvathi Bayi. She currently travels between India and abroad.

== Titles and precedence ==
All members of the ruling family receive two names — an official personal name, and a name associated with the 'star' or 'Thirunal' under which they are born (e.g.: Maharajah Swathi Thirunal Rama Varma).

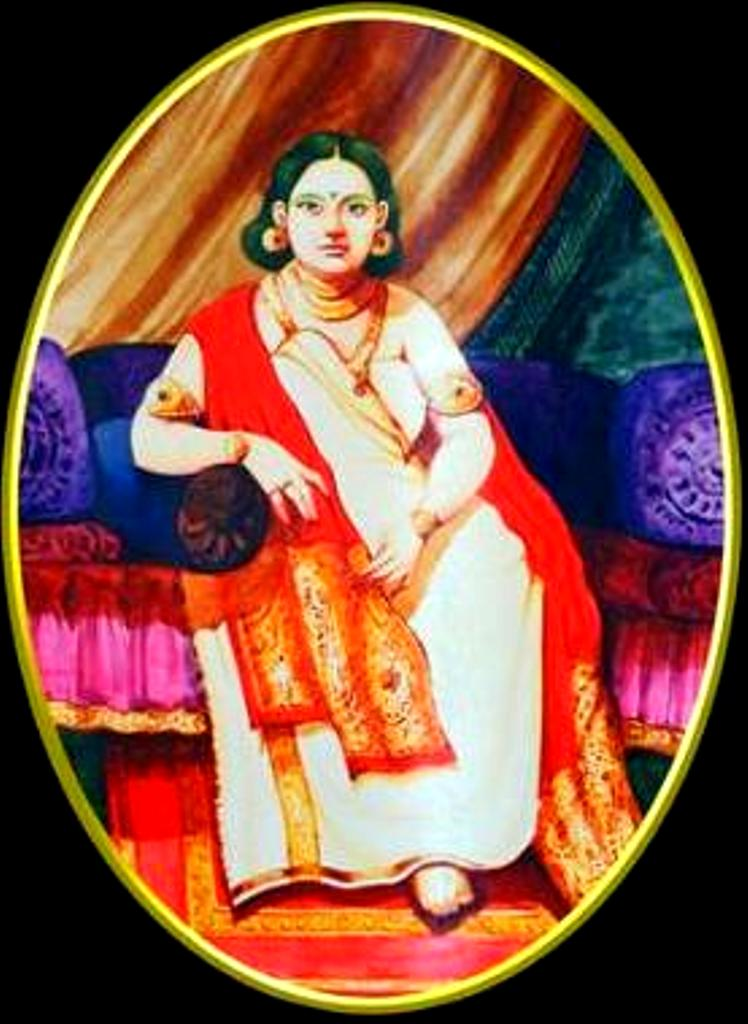
Aayilyam Thirunal Maharani Gowri Lakshmi Bayi – The only Queen of Travancore to have ruled the kingdom in her own right.

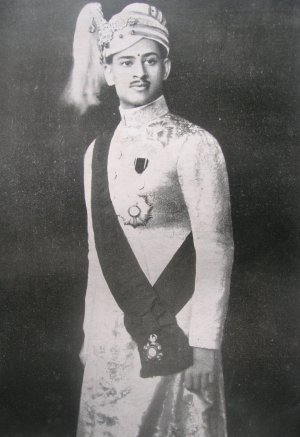
Chithira Thirunal Balarama Varma – The last ruling Maharajah of Travancore

- The senior most male or the Valiya Thampuran is the head of the royal family, born in the female line, to a Queen of Attingal, becomes King with the title of Sree Padmanabhadasa Vanchi Paala (Personal Name) Varma Kulasekhara Perumal Kiritapathi Manney Sultan Maharajah Raja Ramaraja Bahadur, Shamsher Jang, Maharajah of Travancore.
- The Heir Apparent is known as the Maharajkumar (personal name) Varma, Eliya Raja of Travancore.
- The senior most female of the royal family is the Attingal Mootha Thampuran and is known as Sree Padmanabhasevini Vanchidharma Vardhini Raja Rajeshwari Maharani (personal name) Bai, Senior Maharani of Travancore, with the style of Her Highness. The Junior Maharani is the Attingal Elaya Thampuran and if mother of the ruling prince is known as Sree Padmanabhasevini Vanchipala Dyumani Raja Rajeshwari Maharani Maharani (personal name) Bai, Junior Maharani of Travancore, with the style of Her Highness. The First Princess is known as Kochu Thampuran and is known as (personal name) Sree Padmanabhasevini Vanchidharma Vardhini Attingal Kochu Thampuran.
- Prince Consorts of the Senior and Junior Maharani are known as the Valiya Koyi Thampuran and Kochu Koyi Thampuran respectively, selected from one of four or five royal houses (or 'palaces') who were closely related to the ruling family. Kerala Varma Valiya Koil Thampuran, consort of Maharani Bharani Thirunal Lakshmi Bayi, and Col. G. V. Raja, consort of Maharani Karthika Thirunal Lakshmi Bayi, went on to become famous in their own terms.
- Consorts of the Maharajahs are usually Nair women, and from Ammavedu, and hence, are ranked as nobility, and not royalty. They are known as Ammachi Panapillai Amma and hold the title of (mother's house name) Ammachi Panapilla Amma Srimathi (personal name) Pilla.. The Maharajahs are only allowed morganatic marriages so as to maintain Marumakkathayam. The Travancore Maharajahs' children do not succeed to the throne under the Marumakkathayam Law, as they belong to their Nair mother's family and are not royalty. Instead they get a title of nobility, namely Thampi and Kochamma. The sons of the ruling Kings are known as Sri (mother's house name) (personal name) Chempakaraman Thampi. The daughters of the Kings are known as (mother's house name) Ammaveetil Srimathi (personal name) Pilla Kochamma. The descendants of Ammachis get the title of Thankachi (female) & Thampi (male).

=== Succession and Line of Succession ===
The Travancore royal family follows Marumakkathayam, the matrilineal system of inheritance and succession through the ruler's sisters' children.

The last ruling Maharajah of Travancore was Chithira Thirunal Balarama Varma, who died on 20 July 1991 after a stroke. His younger brother, Uthradom Thirunal Marthanda Varma, died at a private hospital in the early hours on 16 December 2013. He was succeeded by Moolam Thirunal Rama Varma, son of Maharani Karthika Thirunal Lakshmi Bayi and G. V. Raja.

According to an insider's account, the next in line of succession would be his cousin Revathi Thirunal Balagopal Varma, the son of the princess Uthram Thirunal Lalithamba Bayi (daughter of Maharani Pooradam Thirunal Sethu Lakshmi Bayi) of Travancore from the Bangalore branch and Prince Ravi, Prince Raghu and Prince Aditya from Travancore branch.

== Marriage and other customs ==
The marriages of the princesses are known as Pallikettus.

=== Cessation of the practice of mahādanams ===
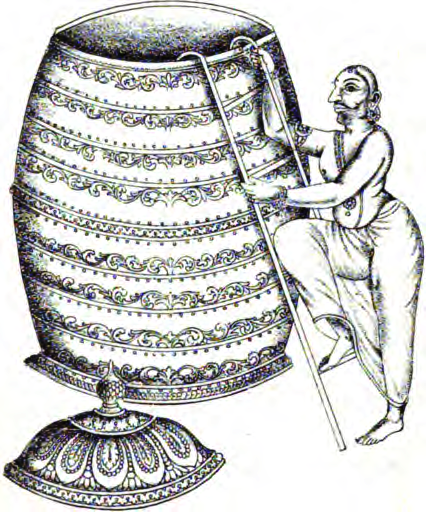
Marthanda Varma entering the golden tub during Hiranyagarbha ceremony

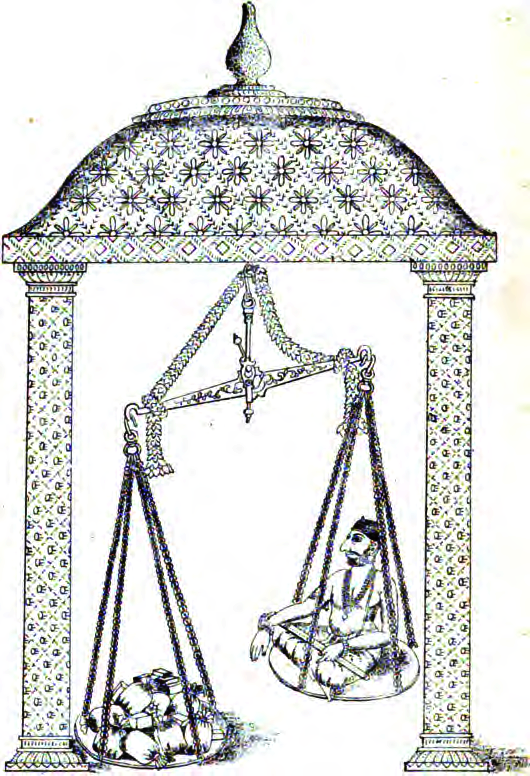
Marthanda Varma performing Thulapurusha Danum ceremony

Though the erstwhile royal family of Travancore were originally Nairs, had Chera lineages to acquire the title of Chera titles. They performed with periodic performance of 16 mahādānams (great gifts in charity) such as Hiranya-garbhā, Hiranya-Kāmdhenu, and Hiranyāswaratā in which each of which thousands of Brahmins had been given costly gifts apart from each getting a minimum of 1 kazhanch (78.65 gm) of gold so that the maharajah (excluding other members of the travancore family) could be considered a legitimate ritual ruler. The brahmins who were the pioneers of the varna system in Kerala, established the military function-shudras for martial duties and protection since Kerala lacked/didn't have a four fold varna system like in the north of India and was without kshatriyas and martial groups for protection and leadership. Varna wise the maharajah and his family were nairs i.e military function sat shudras and not Kshatriya, and in order to get ritual acceptance from the Brahmins, had to undergo a symbolic rebirth ceremony through Hiranyagarbham (which literally means to be reborn from a golden egg) and Thulapurusha dhanam or Thulabharam (where gold, riches and gifts were weighed on a scale corresponding to the maharajah's body weight and then gifted to the priests.) Once these rituals were completed the ruler would be considered legitimate by the brahmins and solely the maharajah was considered eligible to wear the janeu or the sacred thread traditionally. In 1848 the Marquess of Dalhousie, then Governor-General of British India, was appraised that the depressed condition of the finances in Thiruvithamkoor was due to the mahādanams by the rulers. Lord Dalhousie, instructed Lord Harris, Governor of the Madras Presidency, to warn the then King of Thiruvithamkoor Martanda Varma (Uttram Tirunal 1847–60) that if he did not put a stop to this practice, the Madras Presidency would take over his Kingdom's administration. This led to the cessation of the practice of mahādanams. All Travancore Kings including Sree Moolam Thirunal conducted Hiranyagarbham and Tulapurushadaanam ceremony. Maharajah Chithira Thirunal is the only King of Travancore not to have conducted Hiranyagarbham or Tulaapurushadaanam as he considered these as an extremely costly ceremonies thereby remaining a Nair.

== Family members ==
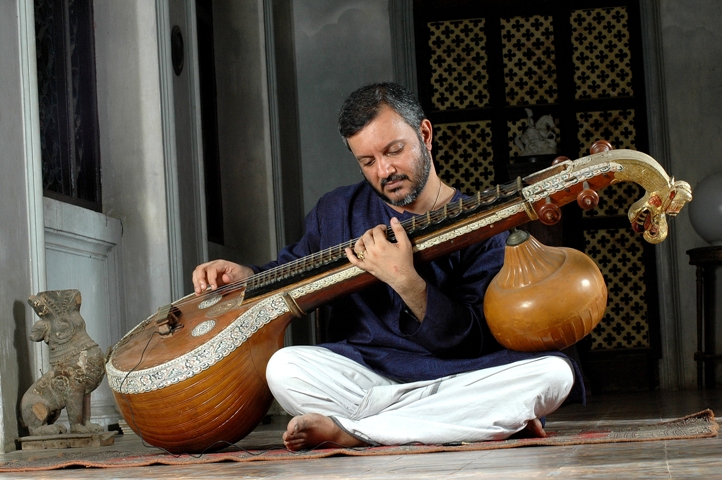
Prince Aswathi Thirunal Rama Varma is a noted Indian classical musician, vocalist, veena player and writer.

Uthradom Thirunal Marthanda Varma married Ammachi Panapillai Amma Shrimathi Radhadevi Pandalai of Kayamkulam (the daughter of Lieutenant-Colonel Krishnan Gopinathan Pandalai, MB, CM, FRCS, LRCP, Madras), and has a son, Ananthapadmanabhan Thampi and a daughter, Parvathidevi Kochamma. He used to reside at Pattom Palace, Trivandrum, until his death on 16 December 2013.

The current head of the Travancore royal family is Sree Padmanabhadasa Sree Moolam Thirunal Rama Varma, born on 12 June 1949 at Kowdiar Palace as the youngest son of Maharani Karthika Thirunal Lakshmi Bayi by her husband, Lieutenant-Colonel P.R. Godavarma Raja/G. V. Raja of Poonjar Palace. He became the Titular Heir Apparent or Elaya Rajah on 20 July 1991, after the death of Maharajah Sree Chithira Thirunal Balarama Varma. Moolam Thirunal Rama Varma is a Physics graduate from Mar Ivanios College, Trivandrum and also studied business management in London. After his education, he joined Aspinwall and Co Ltd in Mangalore 1971, and served as a consultant and in various executive positions like Additional Director 2004–2005, Director of Planning 2005–2007, Executive Director Aspinwall & Co (Travancore) Ltd since 2005, Member of Aspinwall Promoter Group since 2005, managing director of Aspinwall and Co Ltd in Mangalore since 2008. In 1976 he married Ammachi Panapillai Amma Srimathi Rema Varma of Kilimanoor Palace but divorced in 2002.

Princess Aswathi Thirunal Gowri Lakshmi Bayi was married to the late Sri Sukumaran Raja Raja Varma of Palikkara West Palace, Thiruvalla. He died from injuries after a car accident, at the Ochira District Hospital, Kerala, 30 December 2005. The couple has three children: Prince Pooruruttathi Thirunal Marthanda Varma, Prince Avittom Thirunal Aditya Varma, and Princess Bharani Thirunal Lekha Parvathi Bayi (adopted). Prince Pooruruttathi Thirunal Marthanda Varma married Ammachi Panapillai Amma Srimathi Gopika Nair alias Kalaimamani Gopika Marthanda Varma or Gopika Varma, the Mohiniyattam dancer as well as Director of Dasya Dance School, Member Advisory Board of the Ability Foundation in Chennai etc. they have a son, Sri Vishnu Thampi. Prince Avittom Thirunal Aditya Varma married Shrimathi Resmi Varma of Mariapalli Palace, Kottayam in 2000.

The 26th Constitutional Amendment of India terminated the status of the Maharajahs of the erstwhile princely states as rulers and abolished their rights to receive privy purses and have any special administrative authority. However the other clauses of the agreements signed between the Government of India and the Princes in 1947 legally still hold. Until 1956, Chithira Thirunal Balarama Varma served as Rajpramukh of Thiru-Kochi. Later in 1971 while the family lost their privy purse and other privileges, the rights of the family in the Sree Padmanabhaswamy Temple were respected and the current head of the family, Sree Padmanabhadasa Sree Moolam Thirunal Rama Varma, fulfills his duty towards the temple as the Titular Maharajah of Travancore and as the Trustee of Sree Padmanabhaswami Temple, Trivandrum, even though he has no part in the administration of the temple.

== Palaces ==
After the Constitutional Amendment of 1971, the properties and estates of the royal family were partitioned and divided into two equal halves among the branches of Maharani Sethu Lakshmi Bayi and Maharani Sethu Parvathi Bayi. However certain legal disputes continued between Balagopala Varma (the grandson of Sethu Lakshmi Bayi) and Maharajah Sree Chithira Thirunal Balarama Varma, regarding the ownership of the Satelmond Palace in Poojapura. According to the verdict given by the Supreme Court of India in the matter, the terms of division of properties was accepted by all members of both branches of the royal family. But later Balagopal Varma(Revathi Nal), who at the time of property division was a minor, accused that Sree Chithira Thirunal had unlawfully taken away a property, Poojappura Stalemond Palace, that rightly belonged to his grandmother, Sethu Lakshmi Bayi. Sree Chithira Thirunal had given away this Palace to the Government of Kerala to construct a new Medical Centre, the now famous, Sree Chitra Thirunal Institute of Medical Sciences and Technology, in 1974. Balagopala Varma(Revathi Nal) also accused that Sree Chithira Thirunal had unlawfully taken away the traditional holdings of Sethu Lakshmi Bayi, as Senior Rani of Attingal. The court also dismissed this argument while giving the final verdict in 1991. Sethu Lakshmi Bayi's case was presented to the then Viceroy of India in the 30s but was dismissed by him, as former Maharajah of Travancore, Anizham Thirunal Marthanda Varma had already removed all the powers of the Attingal Queens in the 18th century itself. Revathi Nal Balagopala Varma took his grievance first to the High Court of Kerala and later to the Supreme Court of India. However, at both courts, the verdicts came in favour of Sree Chithira Thirunal and the appelant, Revathi Nal's, case was dismissed in the final judgement of 1991 by the Supreme Court of India. The Maharajah had donated the Stalemond Palace for the creation of Sree Chitra Tirunal Institute for Medical Sciences & Technology, Trivandrum The case was won by Maharajah Sree Chithira Thirunal after the final verdict given by the Supreme Court Of India in 1991.

Presently only the descendants of Sethu Parvathi Bayi live at Kowdiar Palace as it belongs to her legal heirs and their descendants. They are all based in Trivandrum and are also the ones who keep alive the traditions and rituals of their ancient dynasty including the upkeep of the famous Sree Padmanabhaswami Temple.

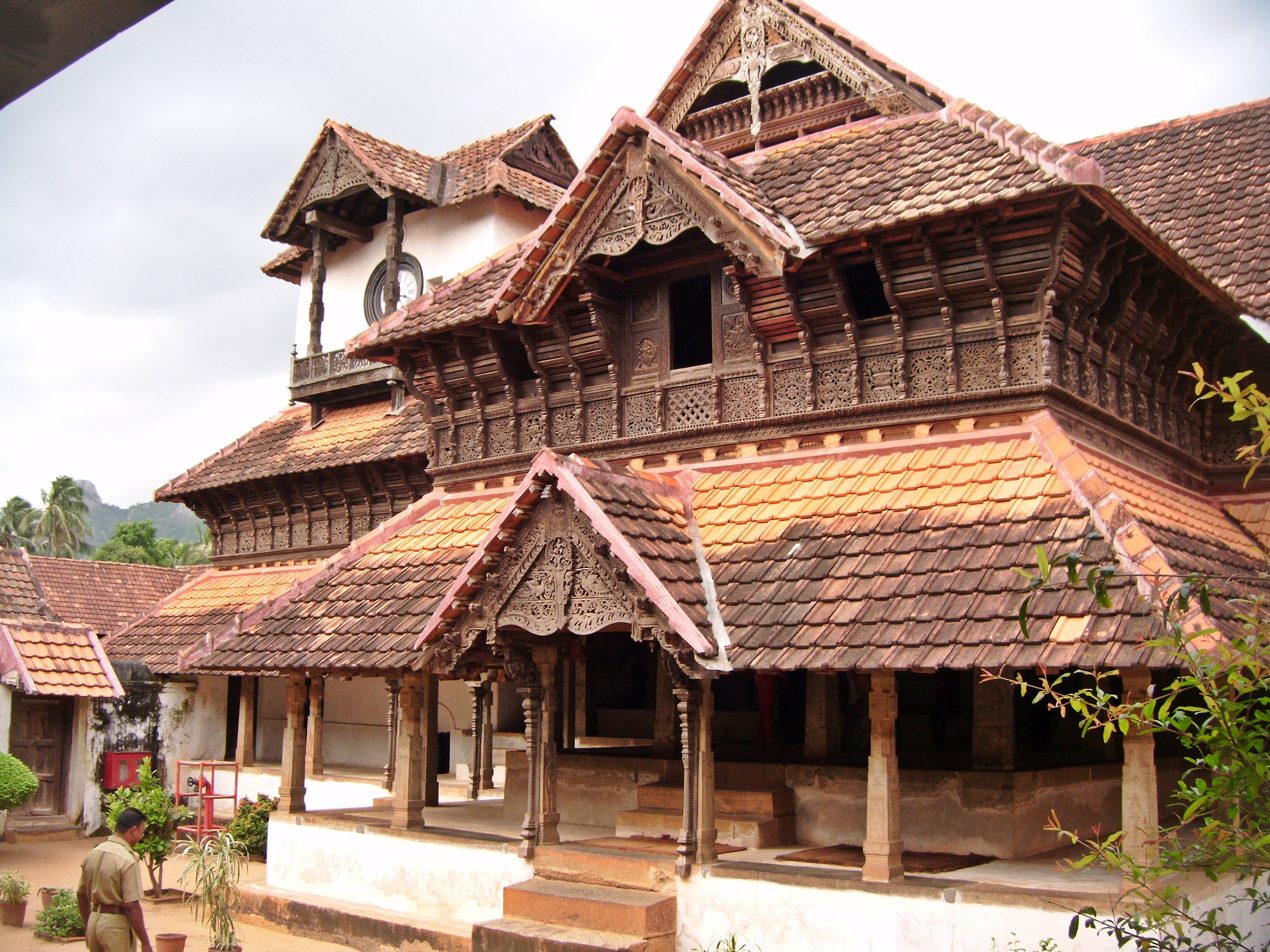
Padmanabhapuram Palace

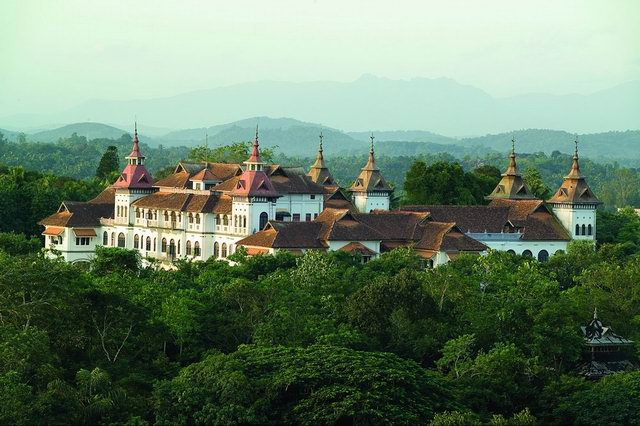
Kowdiar Palace, the official residence of the descendants of Sethu Parvathi Bayi

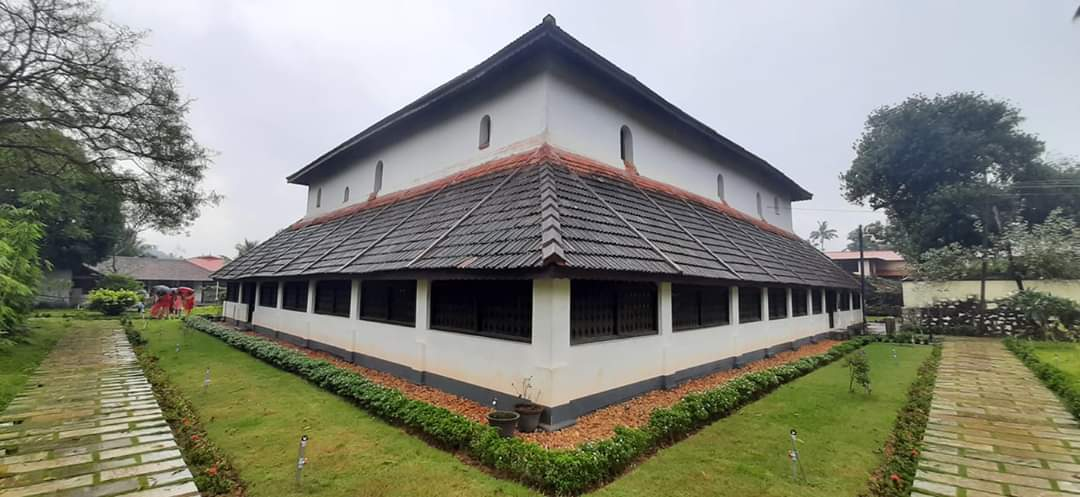
Koyikkal Palace

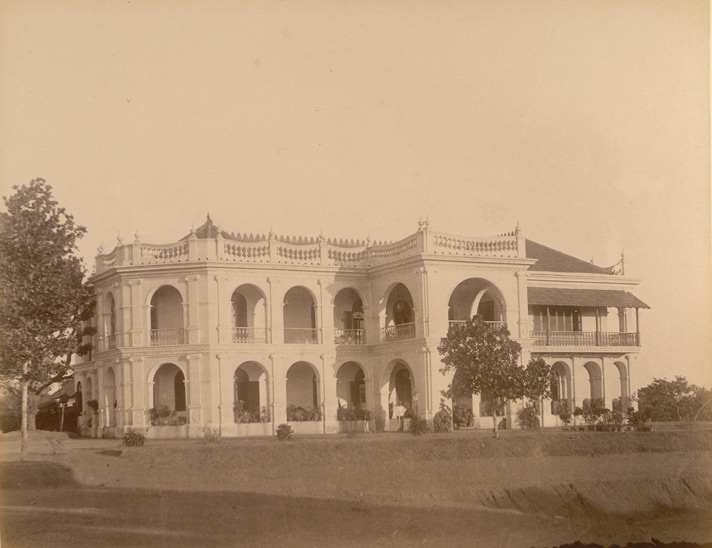
Bhakti Vilas

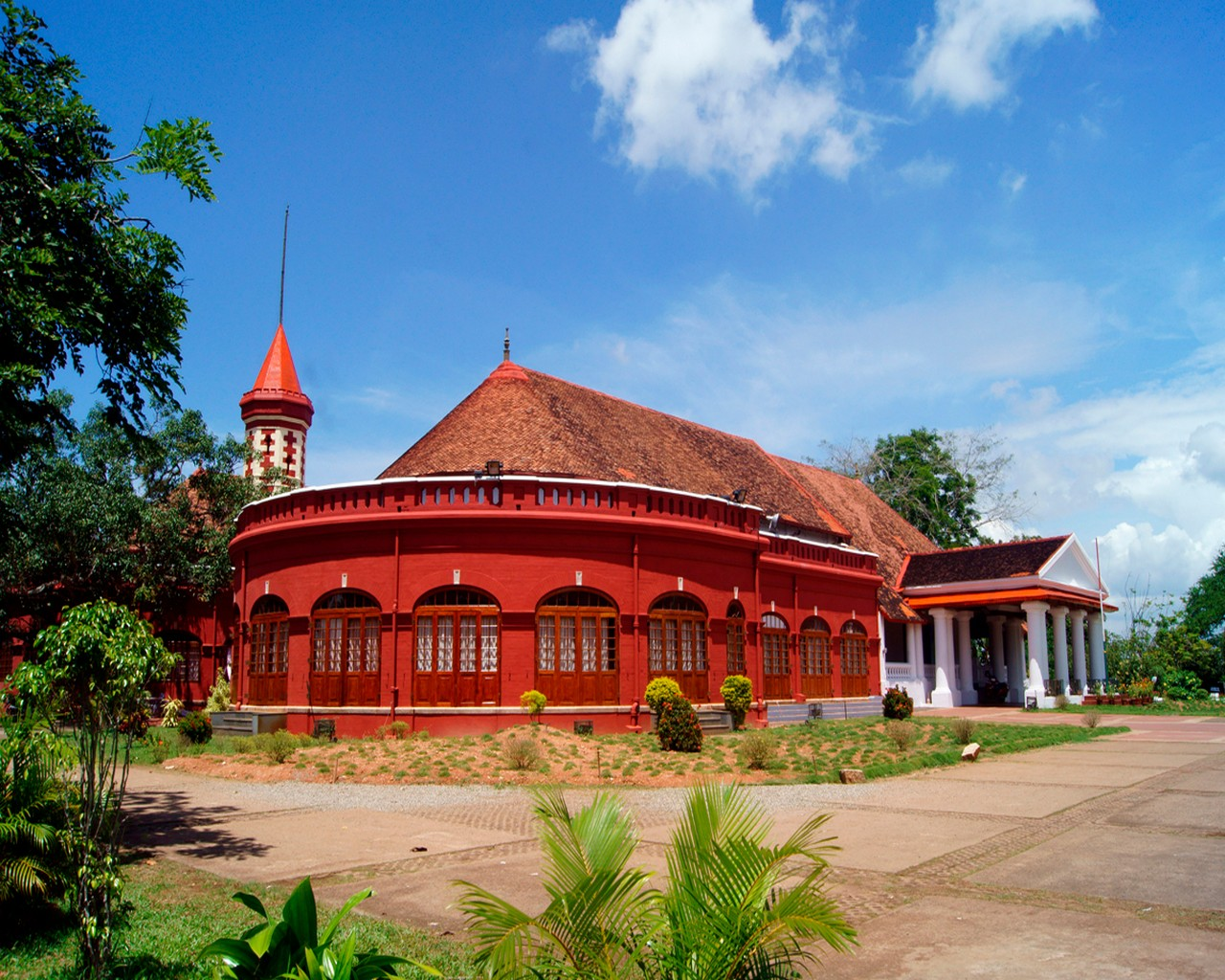
Kanakakkunnu Palace

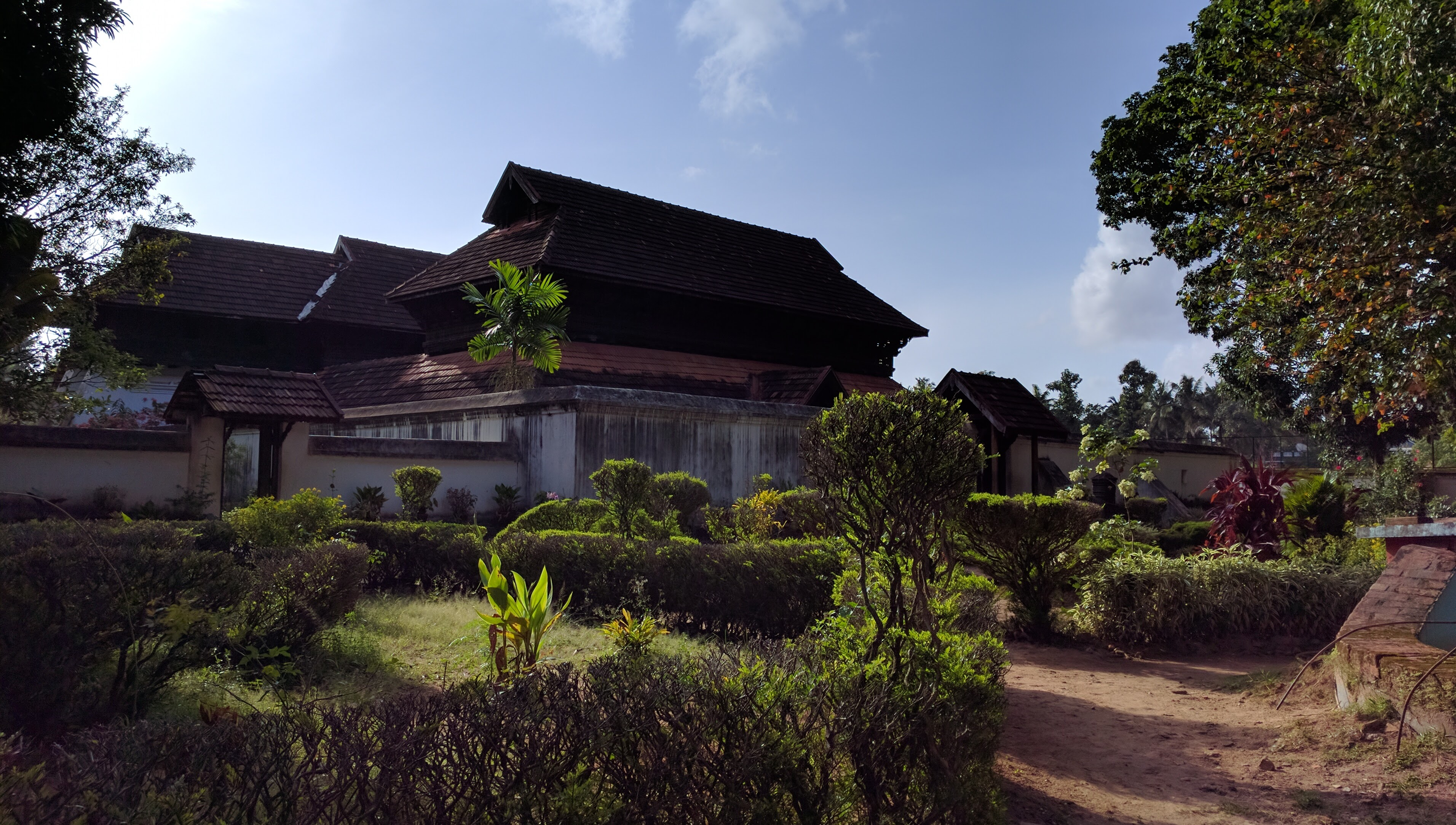
Krishnapuram Palace

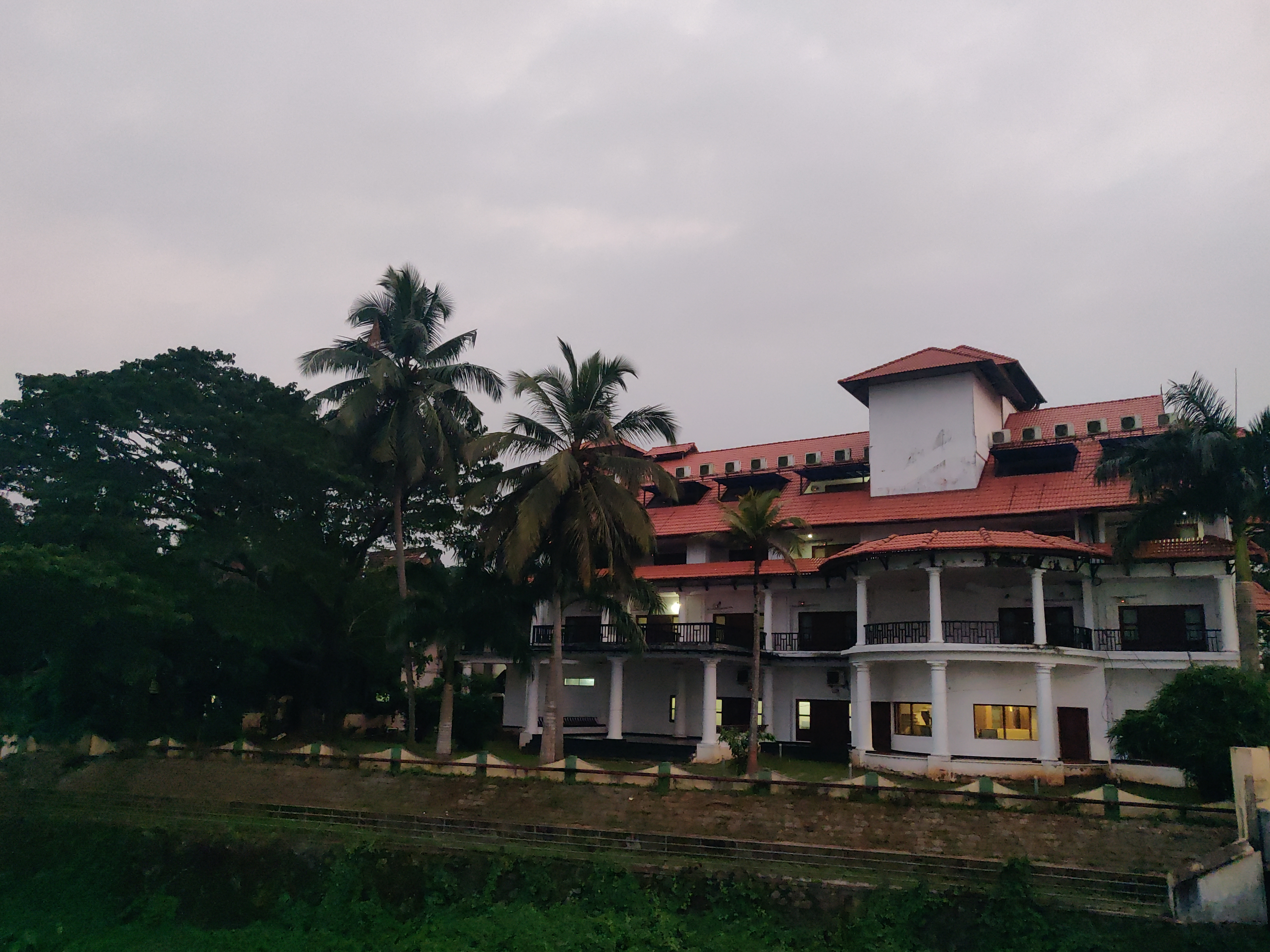
Aluva Palace

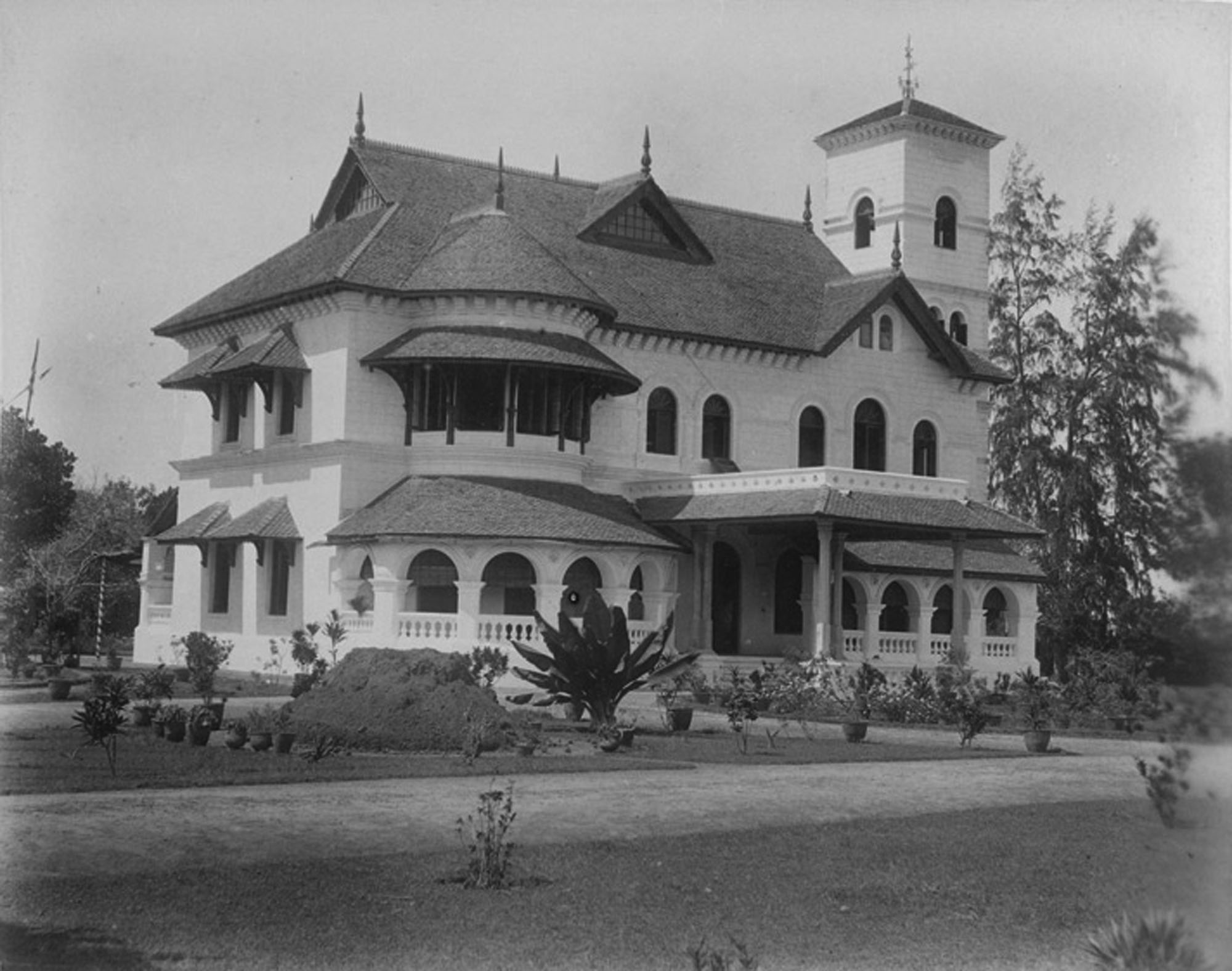
Thevally Palace

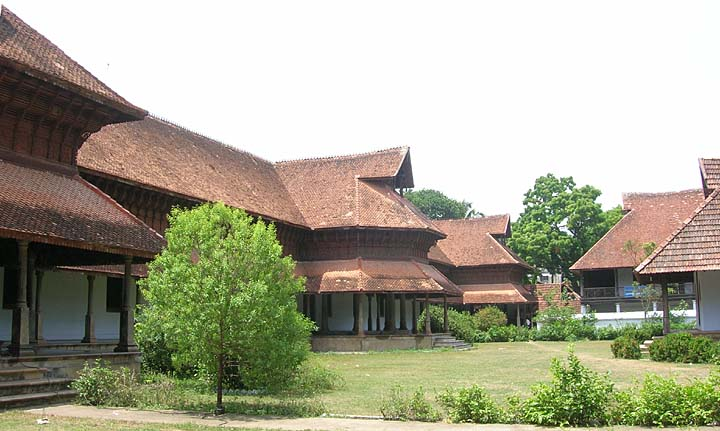
Kuthiramalika Palace

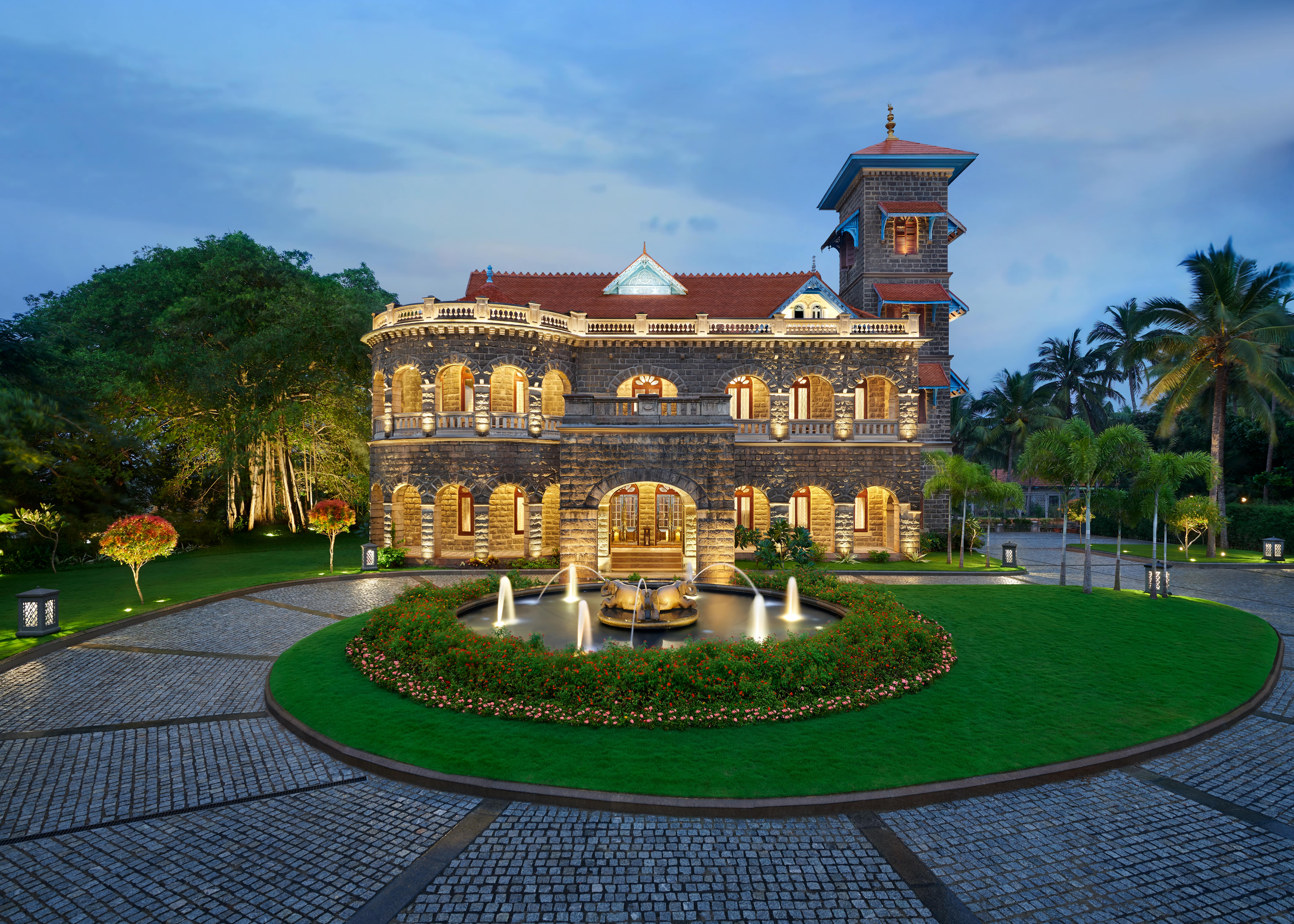
Kovalam Kottaram

== List of Maharajas of Travancore ==
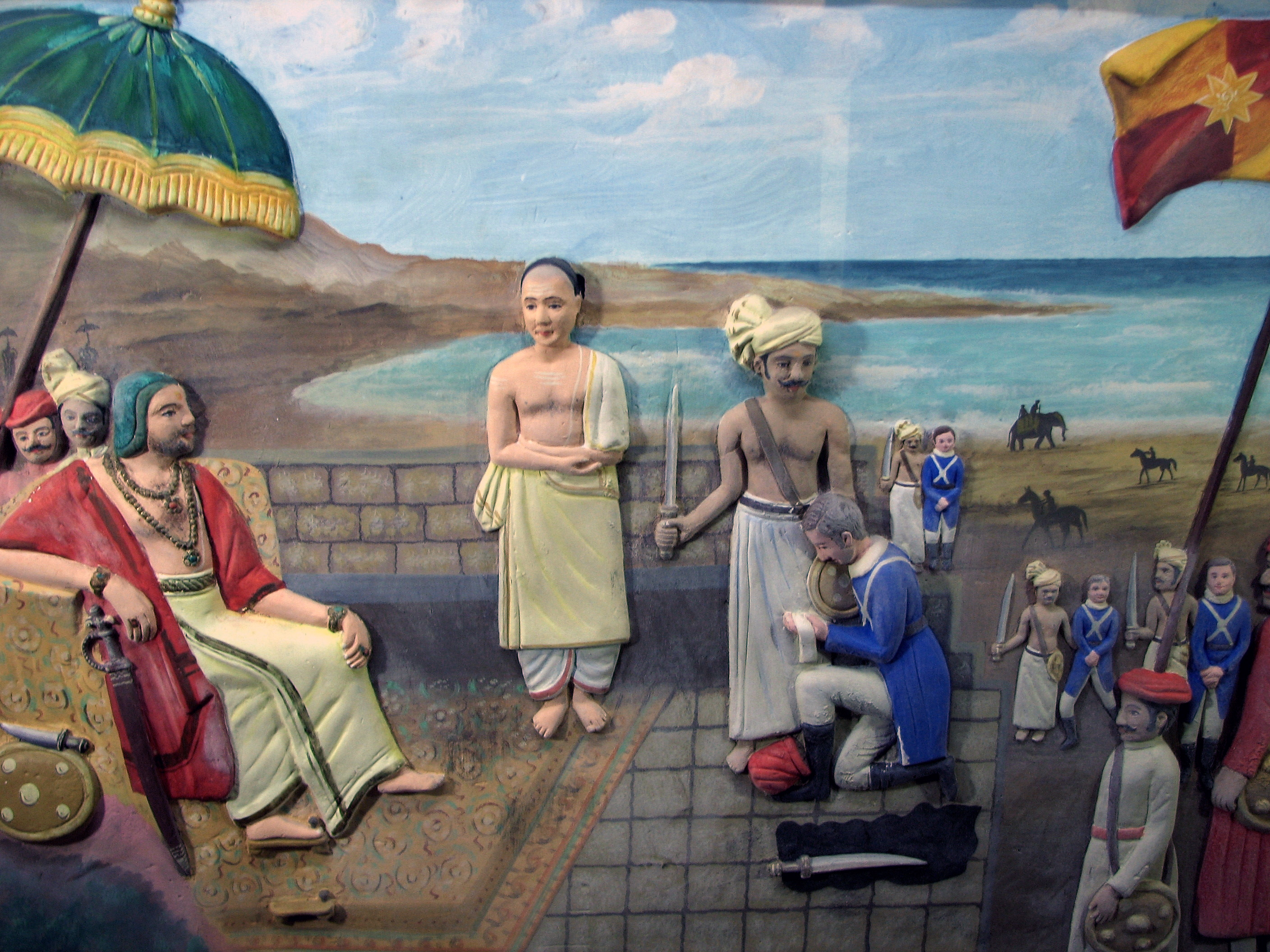
Dutch commander De Lannoy surrenders to King Anizham Thirunal Veerabaala Marthanda Varma (Founder of the Travancore Kingdom) at the Battle of Colachel. Depiction at Padmanabhapuram Palace

1. Anizham Thirunal Veerabaala Marthanda Varma 1729–1758
2. Karthika Thirunal Rama Varma (Dharma Raja) 1758–1798
3. Avittom Thirunal Balarama Varma 1798–1810
4. Gowri Lakshmi Bayi 1810–1815 (ruled pending the birth of a son, 1810–13; regent for her new-born son, 1813–1815)
  - Gowri Parvati Bayi (Regent for her nephew) 1815–1829
5. Swathi Thirunal Rama Varma 1829–1846 (king from birth in 1813, crowned in 1815, ruled from 1829 to 1846)
6. Uthram Thirunal Marthanda Varma 1846–1860
7. Ayilyam Thirunal Rama Varma 1860–1880
8. Visakham Thirunal Rama Varma 1880–1885
9. Sree Moolam Thirunal Rama Varma 1885–1924
  - Sethu Lakshmi Bayi (Regent for her nephew) 1924–1931
10. Chithira Thirunal Balarama Varma (born in 1912, succeeded in 1924, received power in 1931, ruled until 1949, Titular Maharajah until 1971, died in 1991)

== See also ==
- Padmanabhaswamy Temple
- Samantha Kshatriya
- Koyi Thampuran
- Ammachi Panapillai Amma
- Travancore House
