= Sethu Lakshmi Bayi =

Regent Maharani of Travancore from 1924–1931

- Maharani of Travancore
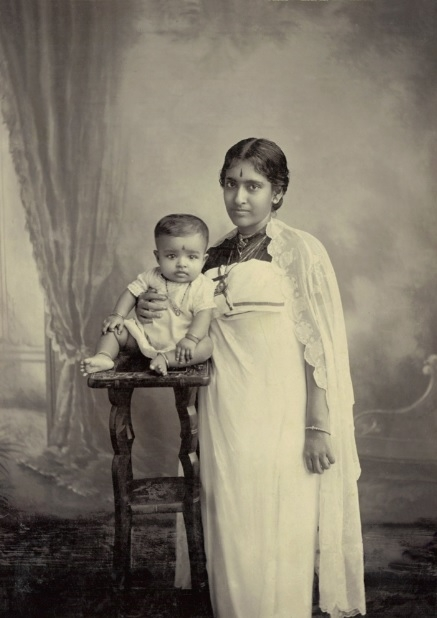
- Image by Jay Gopal Varma, 1924

Senior Maharani of Travancore
- Reign: 15 June 1901 – 22 February 1985
- Coronation: 21 June 1901
- Predecessor: Bharani Thirunal Lakshmi Bayi
- Successor: Karthika Thirunal Lakshmi Bayi

Maharani Regent of Travancore
- Regency: 6 September 1924 – 6 November 1931
- Monarch: Sree Chithira Thirunal

Junior Maharani of Travancore
- Reign: September 1900 - 15 June 1901
- Predecessor: Bharani Thirunal Parvathi Bayi
- Successor: Sethu Parvathi Bayi
- Born: 19 November 1895; Mavelikkara, British Raj
- Died: 22 February 1985 (aged 89); Bangalore, Karnataka, India
- Spouse: Sri Rama Varma (m. 1906)
- Issue: Uthram Thirunal Lalithamba Bayi; Karthika Thirunal Indira Bayi
Names
- Pooradam Thirunal Sethu Lakshmi Bayi
Regnal name
- Her Highness Sree Padmanabhasevini, Vanchidharma Vardhini, Raja Rajeshwari, Maharani Pooradam Thirunal Sethu Lakshmi Bayi, Maharaja, Attingal Mootha Thampuran, Companion of the Imperial Order of the Crown of India, Maharani Regent of Travancore
- Dynasty: Venad Swaroopam
- Father: Kilimanoor Kerala Varma Thampuran
- Mother: Ayilyam Nal Mahaprabha
- Religion: Hinduism

Pooradam Thirunal Sethu Lakshmi Bayi (Malayalam: പൂരാടം തിരുനാൾ സേതു ലക്ഷ്മി ബായി; 5 November 1895 – 22 February 1985) was Senior Maharani of Travancore and the Attingal Mootha Thampuram from 1901 to 1985. She served as Maharani Regent of Travancore from 1924 to 1931 during the minority of her nephew, Chithira Thirunal Balarama Varma.

Sethu Lakshmi Bayi is mostly known for her progressive reforms during the regency of her nephew, during which she was treated with the full dignity and honours of a monarch, wielding absolute authority. Her major reforms are considered to be the abolishment of the Devadasi system and animal sacrifice, women being granted the right to vote and being able to join the Sri Mulam Popular Assembly, the elecrification of Thiruvananthapuram and the development of Cochin Harbour.

== Early life ==
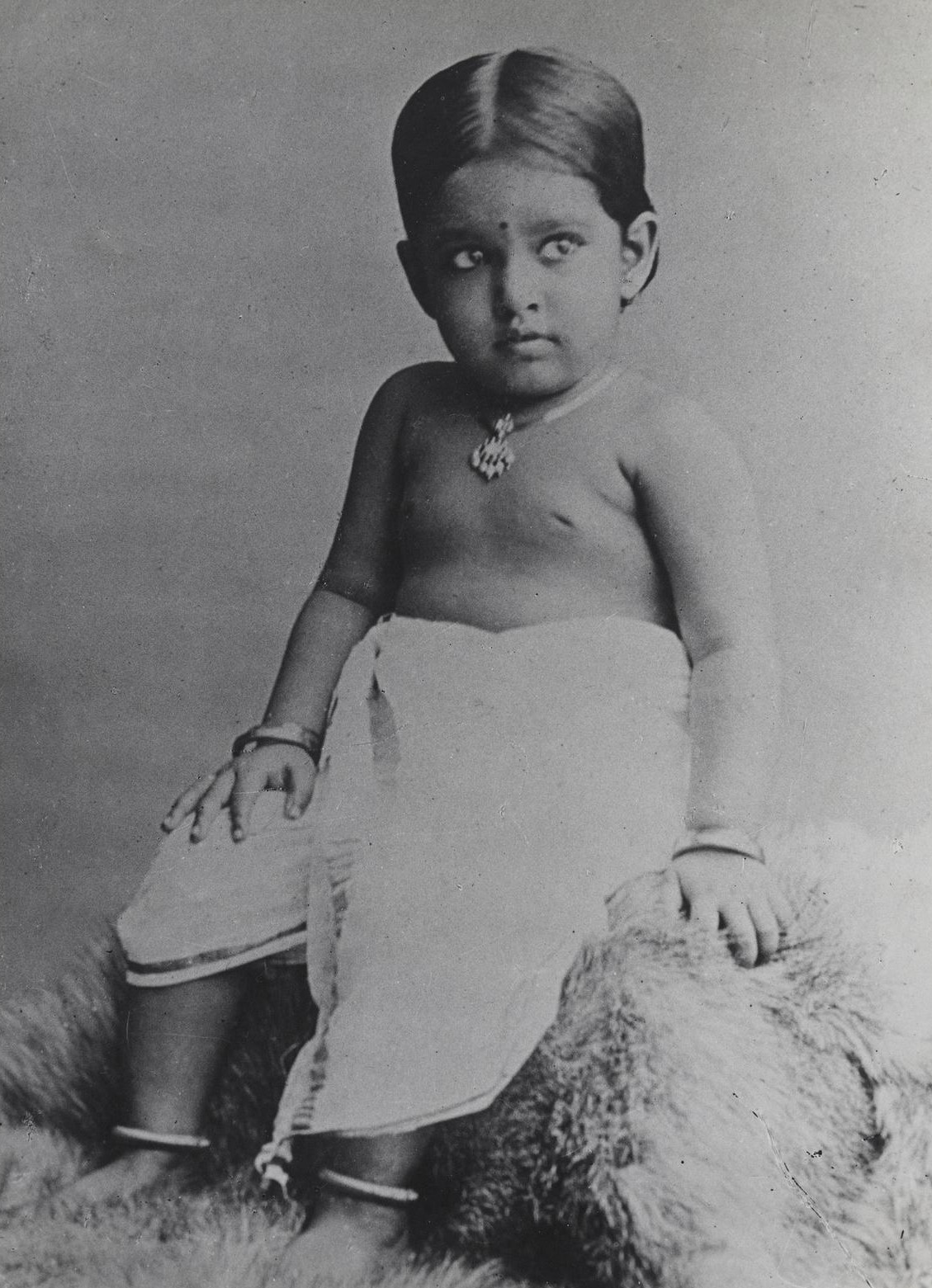
Sethu Lakshmi Bayi in 1897 - 1898, by Raja Ravi Varma.

Pooradam Thirunal Sethu Lakshmi Bayi was born at Utsavamadhom Palace, Mavelikkara, on the 19th of November 1895 to Ayilyam Nal Mahaprabha and Kerala Varma. Her mother belonged to the Utsavamadhom Palace branch of the Kolathunādu Royal Family. A house that used to reign the Kola Swarupam, the Kolathiri line descended from the same ancient dynasty of the Travancore Royal Family, and so they were adopted and installed as the Maharanis of Travancore when there was a shortage of females to continue the line of succession. The current Ranis of Travancore, Senior Maharani Bharani Thirunal Lakshmi Bayi, and Junior Maharani Bharani Thirunal Parvathi Bayi, who were also adopted from the Kolathiri line, did not have any female children.

In the prevalent matrilineal system of inheritance known as Marumakkathayam, the presence of females to continue the line of succession for the dynasty was crucial. With the death of the Junior Maharani, Bharani Thirunal Parvathi Bayi in 1893, followed by that of the eldest of her three sons in 1895, the royal family came to consist solely of Maharajah Moolam Thirunal, Rani Lakshmi Bayi and her two nephews.

=== Installation as Attingal Rani ===
Sethu Lakshmi Bayi after her installment as Attingal Mootha Thampuran.

The Maharani now looked upon her nieces, the children of her youngest sister by the artist Raja Ravi Varma to bring forth girls who could be adopted into the ruling line. In 1895, the Rani's elder niece, Mahaprabha gave birth to a daughter, Sethu Lakshmi Bayi, and the next year, her younger niece, Thiruvadira Nal Kochukunji Thampuran gave birth to Sethu Parvathi Bayi. In 1900 the Rani officially petitioned her adoptive brother, Maharajah Moolam Thirunal to allow her to adopt the two girls. Sethu Lakshmi Bayi became the Junior Maharani of Travancore, and Sethu Parvathi Bayi became the First Princess of Attingal.

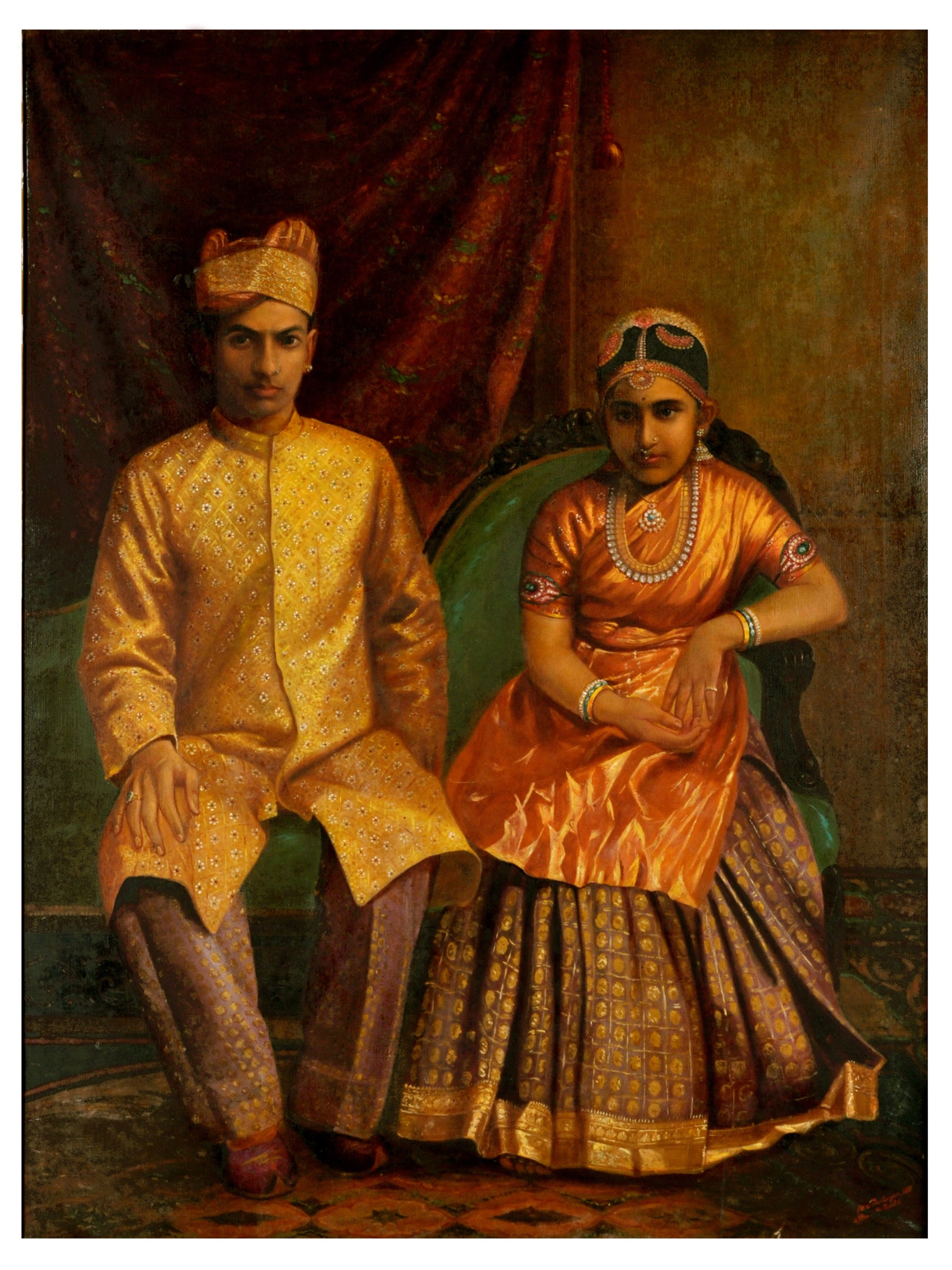
Wedding Portrait of Sethu Lakshmi Bayi, aged 10, and her husband, Sri Rama Varma.

Within a year of the adoption of the princesses in 1900, the two Princes, Chathayam Thirunal and Aswathi Thirunal died, followed by Maharani Lakshmi Bayi herself in 1901. Therefore, at the age of six, Sethu Lakshmi Bayi became the Senior Maharani of Travancore and the Attingal Mootha Thampuran, while Sethu Parvathi Bayi became Junior Maharani of Travancore and Attingal Elaya Thampuran. Kerala Varma, the previous Vailya Koil Thampuram, and the widower of Rani Lakshmi Bayi, was appointed the guardian of the two maharanis.

=== Marriage ===
The Maharaja had requisitioned nominees from all of the ten royal houses in Travancore, to be potential bridegrooms to the two maharanis. Their caretaker, Kerala Varma, was granted the privilege of recommending spouses for them.

His recommendations were his two great-nephews, Rajaraja Varma, and his younger brother, Rama Varma. Their mother was Kochukunji Thampuratti, a member of the Haripad Ananthapuram Palace of the Parappanad Royal Family, of which Kerala Verma was a member of. Rajaraja was a well accomplished and mature man who had posed for Raja Ravi Varma's painting, Sri Varma Vanquishing the Sea (1906). Sethu Lakshmi Bayi chose Rama Varma, the younger brother, which was unexpected because Rajaraja Varma was considered to be the obvious choice for the Senior Maharani.

On 12 February 1909, she consummated her marriage with her husband. Unfortunately, on 18 December 1909, the 12yr old Maharani suffered a stillbirth. Almost three years after her stillbirth, her cousin, Sethu Parvathi Bayi, gave birth to a son, Chithira Thirunal Balarama Varma, who was made Elayaraja.

== Adulthood prior to the Regency ==
On the event of her 18th birthday on 19 November 1913, the Maharaja granted her absolute control over the Sripadam Estate, and the income produced from 15,000 acres of land was accrued on the Senior Maharani. Meanwhile, the Junior Maharani used her status as the mother of the Elayaraja to secure the Vadakkay Kottaram as her residence by the end of November.

Soon after, the Maharaja granted her a 27 acre property in Poojappura, and Rs. 10,000 to construct a palace there. After more than 5yrs, the palace, which would be known as Satelmond Palace, was complete, and it would become her primary residence.. Just a few days after settling in the palace, Sethu Lakshmi Bayi's 46yr old mother, Mahaprabha, died on 8 January 1919, presumably from heart failure.

Before that, on 22 September 1914, the Senior Maharani's former guardian, Kerala Varma, died from the first car accident related death in India while travelling to the Vaikom Mahadeva Temple in northern Travancore.

The Junior Maharani, Sethu Parvathi Bayi, gave birth to another son, Uthradam Thirunal Marthanda Varma Thampuran, on 22 March 1922. Almost two years following, on 30 December 1923, Sethu Lakshmi Bayi gave birth to a daughter, Uthram Thirunal Laithamba Thirunal, Second Princess of Travancore.

A month after the naming ceremony of Princess Laithamba, the Senior Maharani, her husband, and the 7 month old Princess Laithamba, went on holiday to Varkala. Meanwhile, in Thiruvananthapuram, the Maharaja had a decayed tooth that he refused to remove. By the end of July 1924, doctors identified sepsis, but it was too late to treat. On the night of 7 August 1924, the Maharaja died. His successor was Sethu Parvathi Bayi's son, Chithira Thirunal Balarama Varma, but since he was 12 years old. As Sethu Lakshmi Bayi was the most senior female member of the Royal Family, she was made Maharani Regent.

== The Regency ==
=== Reforms ===
==== Vaikom Satyagraha ====
At the time the regency commenced, Travancore was facing significant social agitation associated with the Vaikom Satyagraha, a protest movement that had begun earlier in 1924 against caste-based restrictions preventing lower-caste communities from using the public roads surrounding the Vaikom Mahadeva Temple.

In 1925, negotiations between the Regency government, reform activists, and conservative religious groups leaded to a compromise settlement that allowed members of all castes to use most of the public roads surrounding the temple except the ones immediately rejoining the temple.

==== Temple Administration ====
The regency government introduced state supervision over temples managed by the Travancore Devasworm. Regulations were introduced to standardize temple administration, finances and ritual practices, aiming to prevent misuse of temple revenues, regulate priestly administration and ensure that there was consistent ritual standards across state-controlled temples.

===== Animal Sacrifice =====
Also in 1925, animal sacrifice was prohibited in temples that were administrated by the Travancore Devasworm. This was formed part of broader attempts by the Travancore government to regulate temple practices and align them with evolving social reform movements in Southern India.

==== Devadasi System ====
The regency government abolished the devadasi system in Travancore temples, ending the practice of dedicating women to temple service, preventing future temple dedications and removed the legal basis of the institution within the state. This reform was part of wider South Indian movements against practices viewed exploitative or socially backward.

==== Marumakkathayam System ====
Legal reforms were introduced, affecting the matrilineal inheritance system, known as Marumakkathayam, in Travancore. These reforms allowed members of matrilineal families to claim individua shares of family property, weakened the joint-family taravad system, and faciitated the transition toward nuclear family structures.

== After the Regency ==
After the regency Sethu Lakshmi Bayi retired from active involvement in the affairs to the state. She continued to look after affairs of the Sreepadom estate for sometime after which in 1939 the Maharajah Sree Chithira Thirunal assumed control of the estate and placed it in a trust from which all the female members of the royal family would receive allowances.

In 1935 and 1937, the Regent received the King George V Silver Jubilee Medal and the King George VI Coronation Medal respectively. Sethu Lakshmi Bayi spent her time until 1947 in Travancore with her husband and two daughters. Her second daughter, Karthika Thirunal Indira Bayi was born in 1926. In 1938 her elder daughter Princess Lalithamba Bayi was married to Sri Kerala Varma of Kilimanoor. Later in 1945 her younger daughter Princess Indira Bayi was married to a member of the Harippad family who, however, died in 1949. Thereafter in 1952 she was married to Kerala Varma of Kilimanoor, a cousin of her brother in law.

== After Independence ==
After Independence in 1947 and the creation of Travancore-Cochin in 1949, Lalithamba Bayi moved away to Bangalore and settled there with her children. In the early 1950s Indira Bayi settled in Madras and Sethu Lakshmi Bayi was alone in Trivandrum. Slowly she started disposing the many properties and palaces and by the late 1950s was contemplating moving to Bangalore to be with her daughter and grandchildren. This was hastened in 1957 by her servants in the Palace forming a Union and asking for their rights. While it was strictly controlled and put down initially, it resurfaced in 1958 and the servants went on strike. About this time Sethu Lakshmi Bayi had a mild heart attack as well. Thereafter it was decided that she should stay with her family members in Bangalore. Thus in 1958 the she moved to Madras after leaving Trivandrum hastily, and by early 1959 moved to Bangalore where she constructed a bungalow for herself close to her daughter's house and took up residence there. She never returned to Travancore. Sethu Lakshmi Bayi lived in Bangalore for more than 25 years. In 1971 the Government of India abolished the Privy Purse in India given to former rulers and their families and thus Sethu Lakshmi Bayi stopped receiving her allowances. However, after a prolonged legal battle, a few years before her death, the pension granted her after the regency was reinstated. For many years, she had been bedridden and ill in Bangalore and in February 1985, Sethu Lakshmi Bayi died in Bangalore. She was at that time the last surviving member in the Order of the Crown of India.

The Malayala Manorama daily describes the reign of Sethu Lakshmi Bayi as follows:

The reign of Setu Lakshmi Bayi was the Golden Age of Travancore. At the time these words echoed through the land: "When the Rani of Vanchi rules, there is everlasting Thiru Onam in Vanchinadu."

Mahatma Gandhi about Sethu Lakshmi Bayi in his Young India (26 March 1925) magazine :

My visit to Her Highness was an agreeable surprise for me. Instead of being ushered into the presence of an over decorated woman sporting diamond pendants and necklaces, I found myself in the presence of a modest young woman who relied not upon jewels or gaudy dresses for beauty but on her own naturally well formed features and exactness of manners. Her room was as plainly furnished as she was dressed. Her severe simplicity became an object of my envy. She seemed to me an object lesson for many a prince and many a millionaire whose loud ornamentation, ugly looking diamonds, rings and studs and still more loud and almost vulgar furniture offend the taste and present a terrible and sad contrast between them and the masses from whom they derive their wealth.

Mountbatten on Sethu Lakshmi Bayi :

No one who met her once could ever forget her. She stands as a shining example to womanhood as a great queen and a great woman

Every year the Maharani Setu Lakshmi Bayi Memorial lecture is held in Trivandrum by the Travancore royal family. In 1995, on her 100th birth anniversary, her biography At the Turn of the Tide, written by her grand daughter Lakshmi Raghunandan was published by the "Maharani Setu Lakshmi Bayi Memorial Charitable Trust" in Bangalore.

== Criticisms ==
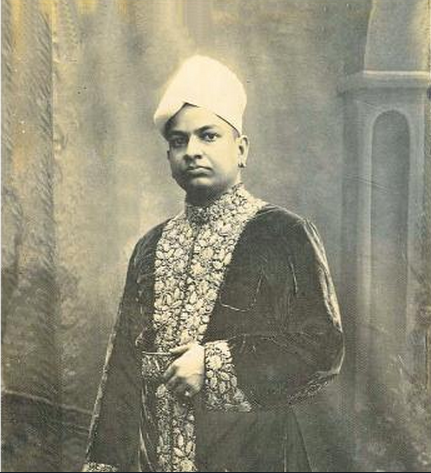
Sri Rama Varma of Haripad, the consort of Sethu Lakshmi Bayi.

The Press Regulation Act of 1926 passed by the Regent Sethu Lakshmi Bayi is considered as a draconian law by historians. The public protesters, headed by E. V. Krishna Pillai and T. K. Madhavan at Travancore Political Conference in Trivandrum, alleged that the new Press Act was solely formulated to protect the consort of Regent Maharani, Rama Varma Valiya Koyi Thampuran, from public criticism against his illegal interference in the administration of Travancore. It must be said in defence of the Newspaper Regulation Act that the measure was taken to protect ordinary citizens from mud slinging campaigns and scandals indulged in by small newspapers "which come into temporary existence with the special object of vilification and when the object is carried out these news sheets disappear" (United India and Indian States", Delhi, 31 July 1926). This Regulation was hailed by K. Gopalan Nair, a lawyer and member of the Sree Moolam Popular Assembly, as a measure long overdue. A public demonstration by only upper caste people held to discuss the pros and cons of this Regulation, ended in a vote being taken, wherein the resolution to scrap the Regulation, was defeated by the majority (as per the Report of the Inspector of Police, submitted to the Maharani Regent). Hence she had the support of the upper caste public when the Regulation was passed.

Many historians and researchers have criticized Sethu Lakshmi Bayi for not conducting temple entry for dalits in 1924. When Mahatma Gandhi came to Travancore for the Vaikom Satyagraha, he met the then Regent Sethu Lakshmi Bayi and asked her whether it was not atrocious that when dogs and cattle can walk the roads around temples but some men cannot due to their castes. Sethu Lakshmi Bayi replied that "it was wrong and most unfortunate" and added that "she was just a Regent" and that Gandhi should pose the question to Chithira Thirunal, the future king, who was then but a boy of 12 and the then minor King replied in the affirmative when Gandhi asked the same question to him. Mannathu Padmanabhan, in 1930, had openly criticized the Regent for this decision of not opening Hindu temples for the dalits and that her excuse that as the Regent she had no power to decide, was a lie. He retorted that she had complete power to give temple entry but she simply refused to do the same. However, it must be pointed out that if she referred to herself as a mere Regent, unable to open the temples to the Dalits, it was a truth, because at the time of this meeting her powers as a Regent were yet to be decided upon by the Viceroy. Still, even after approval by viceroy, she did not allow temple entry for Dalits. In all other princely states of India, Regents were supported by Regency Councils which would pass legislations. In Travancore, however, owing to the matrilineal system of inheritance, the Maharani had as much authority as a Maharaja. This was a new concept to the British, hence the delay in recognizing her powers within the State. After many letters were exchanged between the Maharani and the A.G.G. in Madras, she was finally given full power to rule. Therefore, her plea to Gandhiji, that she was only a Regent at the time, was not a lie. However, even after she could exercise her authority she realized that it was too sudden and sweeping a change for the tradition bound people of Travancore to accept Temple entry for Dalits . Gandhiji appreciated this fact, for in his words "..the opening of the roads is not the final but the first step in the ladder of reform..... We may not force the pace" ("Young India", 2 April 1925).

== In popular culture ==
Maharani Setu Lakshmi Bayi (spelled 'Sethu') is the central figure of The Ivory Throne: Chronicles of the House of Travancore, the debut work of Indian writer Manu S. Pillai. The book primarily focuses on the journey of the Maharani —beginning with her adoption and upbringing alongside the Junior Maharani Sethu Parvathi Bayi, her Regency during the minority of the Junior Maharani's son (and heir to the Throne) Chithira Thirunal Balarama Varma and the subsequent tensions that ensued between both the Maharanis after the termination of her Regency and the reign of the Maharaja. The book also chronicles the journey of her children as they departed from Kerala and breaking away from lifestyles of the Travancore royal family (which she herself later did when she moved to Bangalore), their adaptation to the era of the Indian independence movement and the subsequent dismantling of the monarchy during the formation of the Dominion of India. It also touches upon moments of historical significance, such as the development of Cochin Port during the Maharani's reign, the Temple Entry Proclamation and the rise of Communism in Kerala during the subsequent reign of Maharaja Chithira Thirunal Balarama Varma.

The popularity and critical reception of the book has led to interest in a screen adaptation.

== Full Title ==
Her Highness Sree Padmanabhasevini, Vanchidharma Vardhini, Raja Rajeshwari, Maharani Pooradam Thirunal Sethu Lakshmi Bayi, Maharaja, Attingal Mootha Thampuran, Companion of the Imperial Order of the Crown of India, Maharani Regent of Travancore.

== Issue ==
Name	Birth	Death	Marriage/notes
Princess Uthram Thirunal Lalithamba Bayi	30 December 1923	7 November 2008 (aged 84)	1938, Sri Kerala Varma Koil Thampuran of the Kilimanoor royal family; had issue, including Revathi Thirunal Balagopal Varma, the current Elayaraja of Travancore.
Princess Karthika Thirunal Indira Bayi	30 August 1926	20 July 2017 (aged 90)	1945, member of the Harippad royal family, died in 1945; no issue. 1952, Sri Kerala Varma of Kilimanoor Palace; had issue, including Shreekumar Varma.

== See also ==
- Maharani
- Princely State
