= Kerala Varma Valiya Koil Thampuran =

Malayalam-language poet and translator

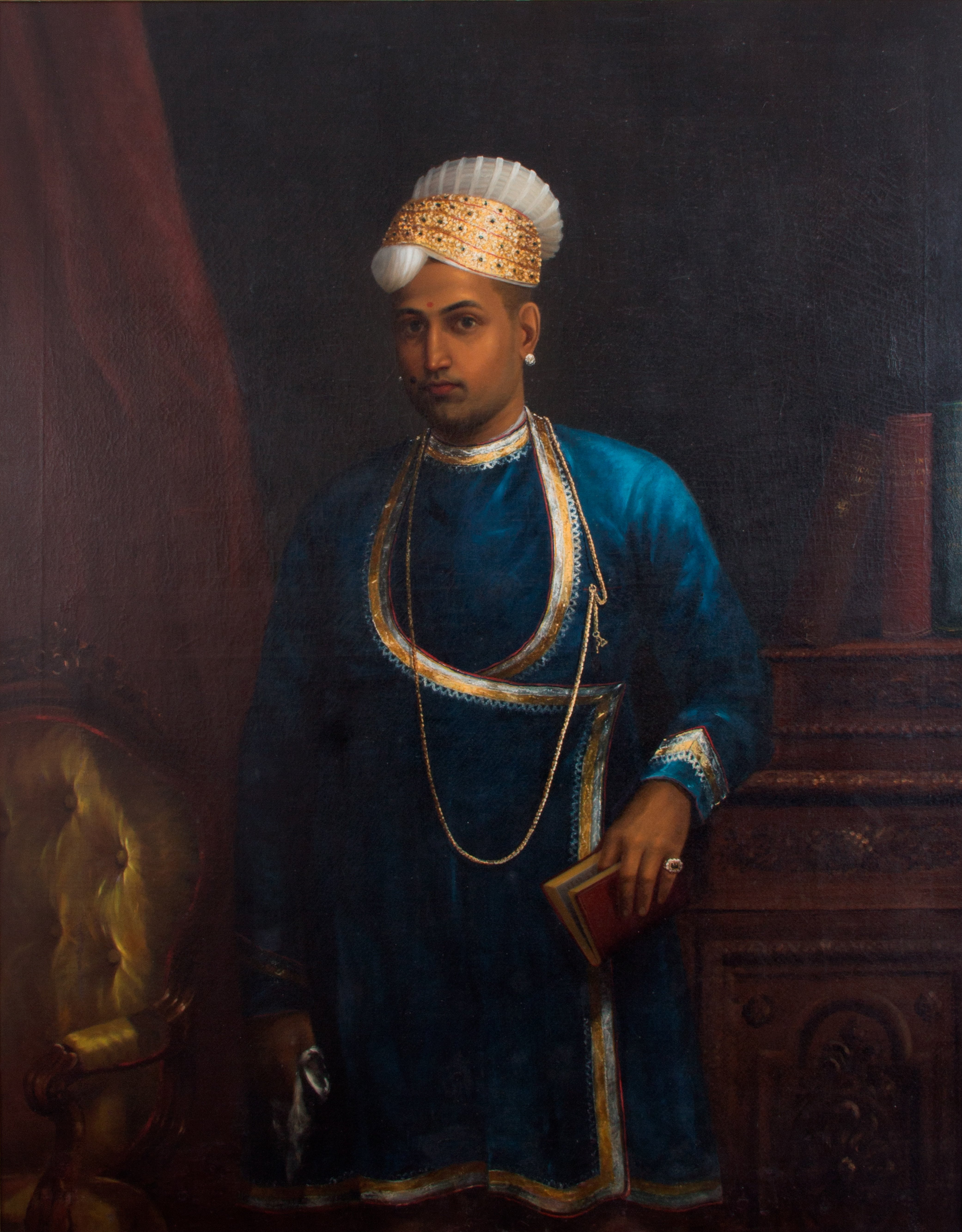

Valia Rajah Of Parappanadu Kovilakam and Valia Thampuran Of Ananthapuram Palace, Haripad
- In office 1913-1914
- Preceded by: Ananthapurath Raja Raja Varma Koil Thampuran

Kerala Varma Valiya Koil Thampuran CSI; (19 February 1845 – 22 September 1914) also spelt Kerala Varma Valiya Koilthampuran and known as Kerala Varma, was a Malayalam - language poet and translator who had an equal facility in writing in English and Sanskrit from the Indian state of Kerala.

He was a prince of Parappanad, and consort to the Senior Rani of Attingal and Maharani of Travancore, Bharani Thirunal Lakshmi Bayi, intended to father future sovereigns of Travancore, although the couple was childless, necessitating the adoption of Lakshmi Bayi's grand-nieces. Kerala Varma is also known as the Kalidasa of Kerala, and was both brother-in-law and cousin to painter Raja Ravi Varma, also a prince of Parappanad, though from the Kilimanoor branch, whom he presented with his first oil paints. A third Parappanad prince, his grammarian nephew A. R. Raja Raja Varma, is known as the Panini of Kerala.

Kerala Varma has been called "a colossal Renaissance figure in 19th century Kerala" and "perhaps the first of the major [Malayalam language] writers who consciously and deliberately began to absorb and celebrate the Western influence" on his native literature. He advocated resuscitation of Malayalam literature by absorbing selected Western influences combined with native Sanskritic elements in poetry, drama and prose.

== Life ==
He was born in Changanacherry at the Lakshmipuram Palace on 19 February 1845 (6 Kumbham 1020) in Pooyam star. His mother was Pooram Nal Devi Amba Thampuratti while his father was Cheriyoor Mullapally Narayanan Namboothiri of Perinchelloor Gramam in Taliparamba, in Kannur. His family had fled Malabar and sought refuge in Travancore during the invasion of Tipu Sultan towards the end of the 18th century. After peace was restored, however, the Parappanad Royal family agreed to accept a pension from the British government and also from that of Travancore, in which several branches would remain, from among which future princes consort of the seniormost two females in the Travancore royal family, Senior and Junior Rani of Attingal, each a Maharani of Travancore, were drawn.

Although the Koil Thampuran was born at Changanacherry, his family subsequently moved to Haripad and settled at the Ananthapuram Palace. In 1859, he was married to Her Highness Bharani Thirunal Lakshmi Bayi, the adopted niece of Uthram Thirunal, then Maharajah of Travancore. His marriage to the Senior Rani thus brought him into close association with the Travancore Royal Family. Later, however, through palace intrigues and personal disaffection with the Maharajah Ayilyam Thirunal he was confined at Haripad forcefully in 1875, only to be released and reunited with his wife in 1880 by Maharajah Visakham Thirunal. He wrote an apology letter to Ayilyam Tihirunal on 26 January 1877 admitting all charges including being in league with Visakham Thirunal and writing a letter to the diwan and later lying that he never wrote such a letter. He also admitted of being attracted to Christianity and addicted to Bhang. He was awarded with the Companion of the Order of the Star of India in 1885 by the British Government. After the death of his consort Rani Lakshmi Bayi in 1901 he was appointed the guardian of her two grandnieces, the Senior and Junior Ranis of Travancore, including Maharani Sethu Lakshmi Bayi.

He died in a car accident in September 1914. At that time, cars were rare in India, and only rich people like him had cars. According to the sources, Kerala Varma was going to Vaikom Mahadeva Temple with his nephew and disciple A. R. Rajaraja Varma, another great scholar, called as 'Kerala Panini'. On the way of return, he stayed at Ananthapuram Palace, Haripad. The next day, while going to Thiruvananthapuram, his car got crashed, and he succumbed to his injuries two days later. It is regarded as first Road accident related death in India. He was cremated with full state honours at his home in Changanassery.

== Literary works ==
Kerala Varma was in close touch with literary movements in both northern and southern parts of Kerala, including Bhashaposhini Sabha and magazines such as Vidya Vinodini and Malayala Manorama.

His work Abhijnana Sakunthalam(1898), a translation of Kalidasa's Sakunthalam, is one of the most acclaimed works of poetry in Malayalam from that period. It influenced a number of other translations of Sanskrit classics into Malayalam and was a success on the stage. The subsequent spate of translations from English and Sanskrit into Malayalam was an important feature of Malayalam literature in the late 19th and early 20th centuries.

He has also written Mayoorasandesham (also spelt Mayura Sandesam; 1894) on the line of Kalidasa's MeghaDooth(aka Meghaduta). In this poetry he has used the peacocks of Haripad temple to send his messages to his wife, the Maharani, in Trivandrum. His celebrated work Visakhavijaya was written after his release by Visakham Thirunal.

== See also ==
- Muloor S. Padmanabha Panicker

== Sources ==
- Travancore State Manual
- Visakhavijaya, a Study
