= Prayikkara =

- Village
- Interactive map of Prayikkara
- Country: India
- State: Kerala
- District: Alappuzha

Languages
  - Official: Malayalam, English
- Time zone: UTC+5:30 (IST)
- Vehicle registration: KL-

Prayikkara is a village situated in Mavelikara, on the banks of the Achankovil river, in between Mavelikara Municipality and Chennithala Panchayat, in Kerala.

== Churches ==
St. Mary Catholic Church is at Prayikkara on the banks of the Achankovil River. Feast of the Immaculate Conception is celebrated on 8 December every year.

== Festivals ==
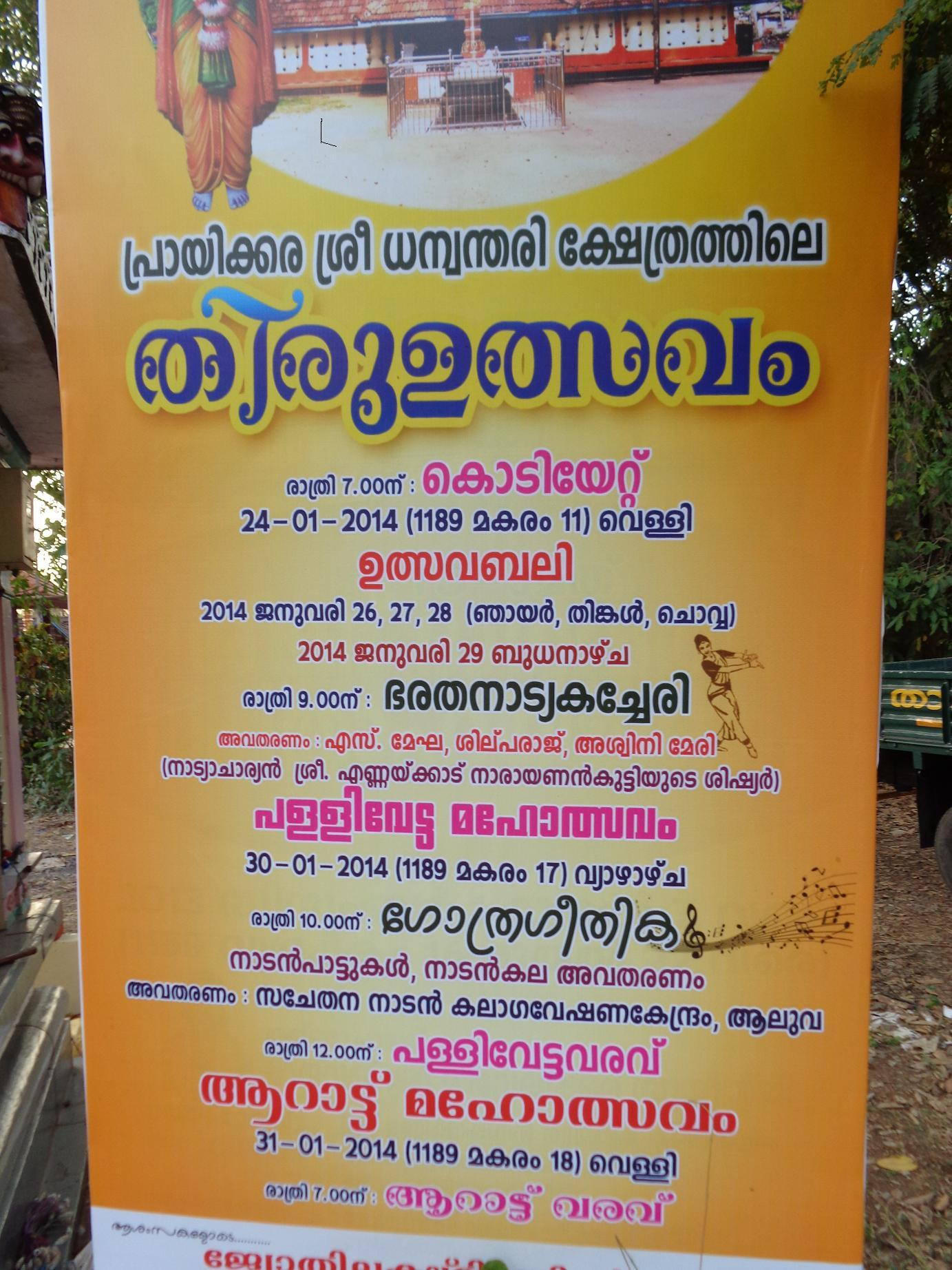
Prayikkara festival

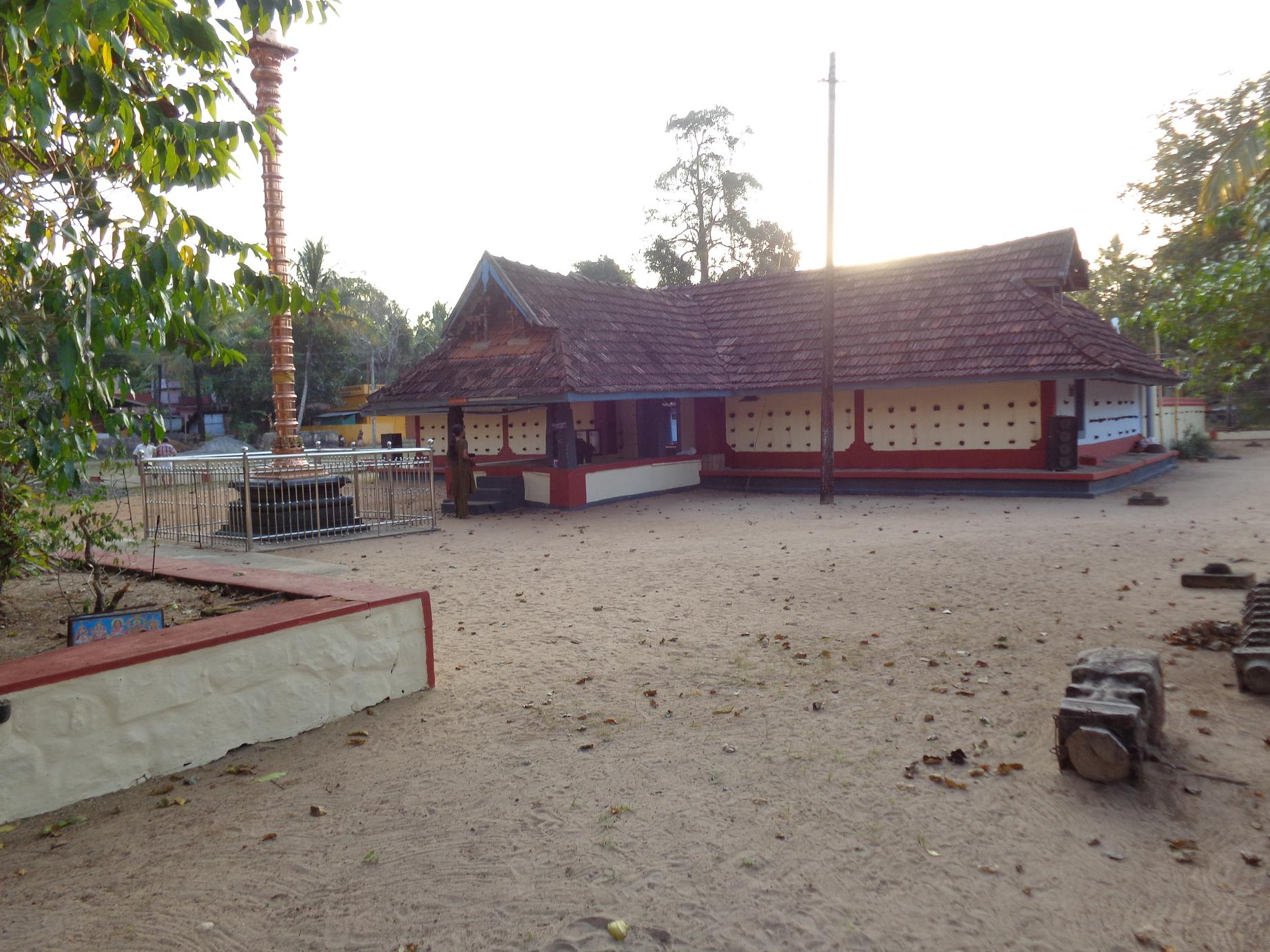
Dhanvanthari Temple

Mother Teresa Trophy Boat Race is held along the stretch on the River Achankovil
