= Parappanangadi =

Parappanangadi Parappanad
- Municipality
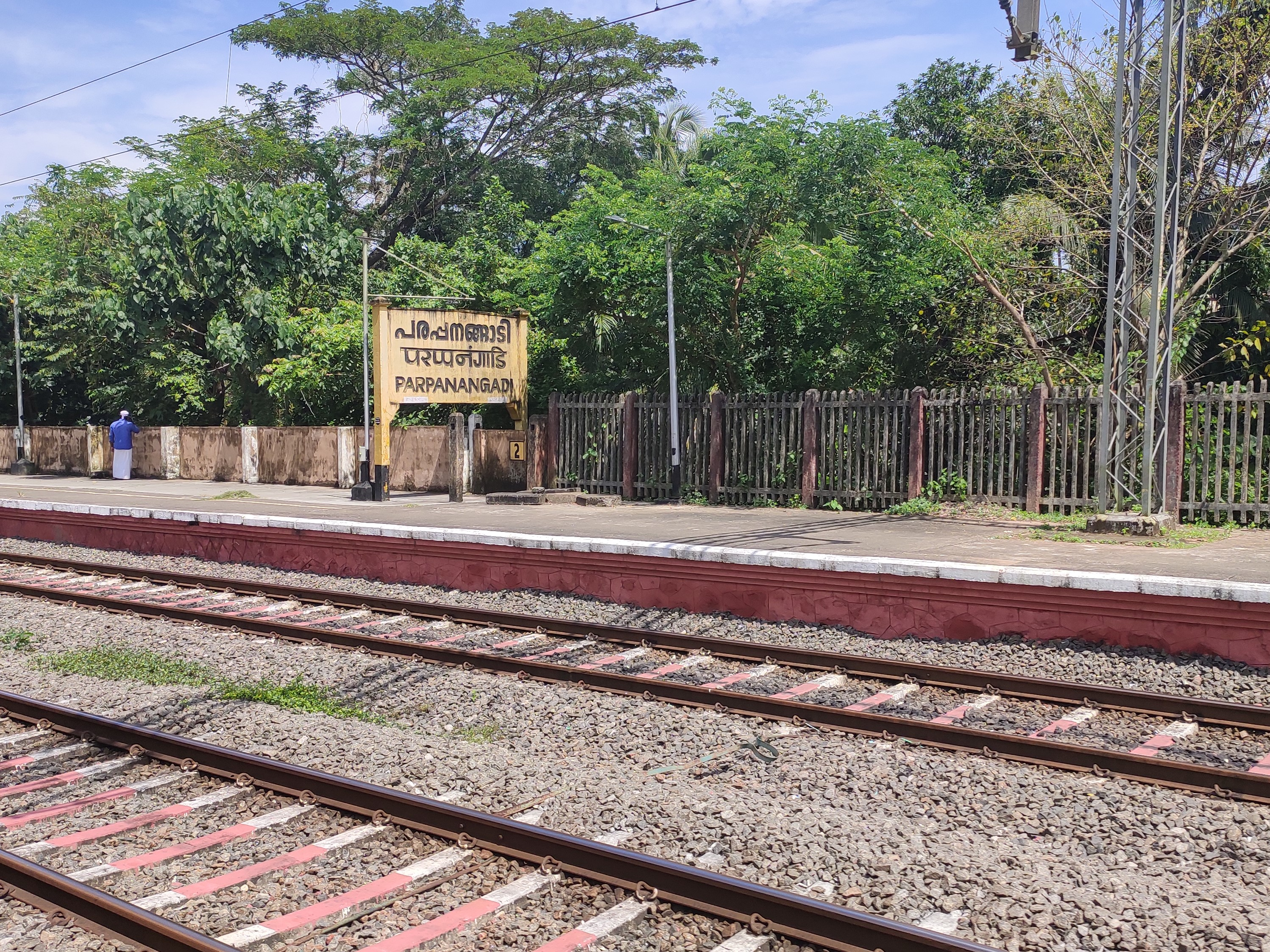
- Parappanangadi railway station

- Location in Kerala, India
- Coordinates: 11°02′59″N 75°51′27″E
- Country: India
- State: Kerala
- District: Malappuram

Government
  - Body: Parappanangadi Municipality
  - Chairperson: Subaida Teacher (IUML)
  - Vice Chairperson: Shameem. K (IUML)

Area
  - Total: 22.5 km^{2} (8.7 sq mi)

Population (2011)
  - Total: 71,239
  - Density: 3,170/km^{2} (8,200/sq mi)

Languages
  - Official: Malayalam, English
- Time zone: UTC+5:30 (IST)
- PIN: 676303
- Telephone code: 0494
- Vehicle registration: KL-65, KL-55, KL-10
- Nearest city: Calicut
- Literacy: 100%
- Lok Sabha constituency: Ponnani
- Civic agency: Parappanangadi Municipality
- Climate: normal (Köppen)
- Website: parappanangadimunicipality.lsgkerala.gov.in/ml

Parappanangadi (IPA: [pɐɾɐpːɐn̺ɐŋːɐːɖi]) is a major town and a municipality in Tirurangadi taluk of Malappuram district, Kerala, India. It is a coastal town located close to the Arabian Sea.

Parappanangadi railway station is one of the oldest railway stations in Kerala. It was a part of the first rail route (Tirur–Chaliyam) in Kerala. Parappanangadi is located 9 km (5.6 mi) north of Tanur on Tirur-Kadalundi Tipu Sultan Road. The town lies on the bank of Kadalundi River. Parappanangadi is located north of the estuary of Poorappuzha River, which is a tributary of Kadalundi River, and south of the estuary of Kadalundi River, which lies in Vallikkunnu. Parappanangadi was one of the major ports on the southwestern coast of India during the medieval period.

The region was ruled by the kingdom of Parappanad, who were vassals to the Zamorin of Calicut, and had the jurisdiction up to Beypore port to the north. In the early medieval period, under the chiefs of Kozhikode and Parappanangadi, Parappanangadi developed as one of the important maritime trade centre on the Malabar Coast. Later it became a part of Eranad Taluk in Malabar District under British Raj.

Nadukani-Parappanangadi Road connects the coastal area of Malappuram district with the easternmost hilly border at Nadukani Churam bordering Nilgiris district of Tamil Nadu, near Nilambur. It passes through major towns such as Tirurangadi, Malappuram, Manjeri, and Nilambur, before reaching the Nadukani Ghat Road. The Koyi Thampurans of Travancore belongs to Parappanad Royal Family. Parappanad royal family is a cousin dynasty of the Travancore royal family.

== History ==
Names, routes and locations of the Periplus of the Erythraean Sea (1st century CE)

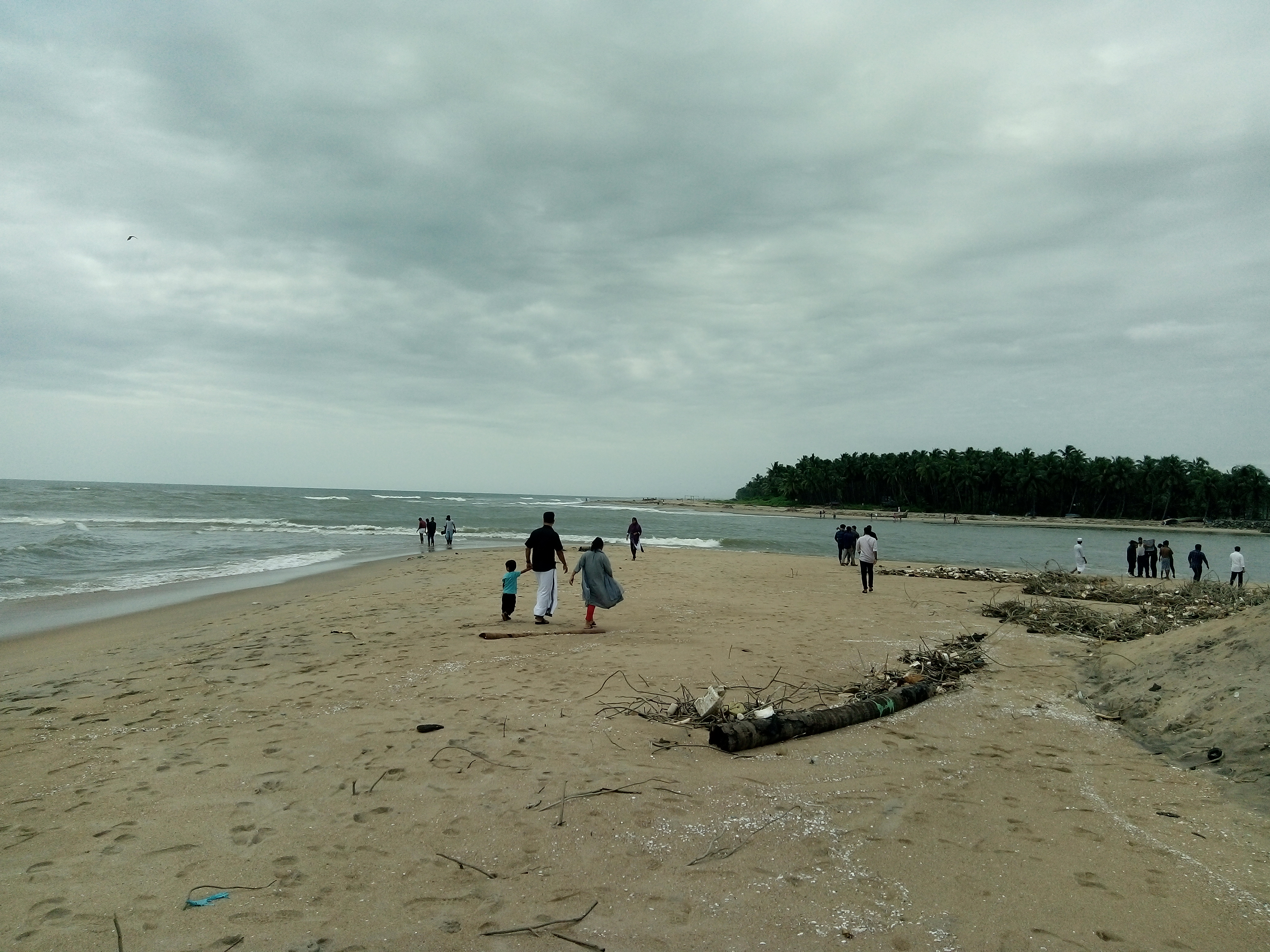
Thooval Theeram beach

This town was the headquarters of Parappanad Kingdom during the medieval period. Parappanangadi, which was then an important centre of trade, was known by the name Barburankad to the Arabs. The kingdom of Parappanad had right over Vallikkunnu-Kadalundi-Chaliyam-Beypore region, which is often identified with the ancient maritime trading port of Tyndis, which was a major center of trade, next only to Muziris, between the Cheras and the Roman Empire, during Sangam period (1st-4th century CE).

Pliny the Elder (1st century CE) states that the port of Tyndis was located at the northwestern border of Keprobotos (Chera dynasty). The North Malabar region, which lies north of the port at Tyndis, was ruled by the kingdom of Ezhimala during Sangam period.

According to the Periplus of the Erythraean Sea, a region known as Limyrike began at Naura and Tyndis. However the Ptolemy mentions only Tyndis as the Limyrike's starting point. The region probably ended at Kanyakumari; it thus roughly corresponds to the present-day Malabar Coast. The value of Rome's annual trade with the region was estimated at around 50,000,000 sesterces. Pliny the Elder mentioned that Limyrike was prone by pirates.

The Cosmas Indicopleustes mentioned that the Limyrike was a source of peppers.

According to the Legend of Cheraman Perumals, the first Indian mosque was built in 624 AD at Kodungallur with the mandate of the last the ruler (the Cheraman Perumal) of Chera dynasty, who converted to Islam during the lifetime of Muhammad (c. 570–632). According to Qissat Shakarwati Farmad, the Masjids at Kodungallur, Kollam, Madayi, Barkur, Mangalore, Kasaragod, Kannur, Dharmadam, Panthalayini, and Chaliyam (Chaliyam was a part of Parappanad), were built during the era of Malik Dinar, and they are among the oldest Masjids in Indian subcontinent.

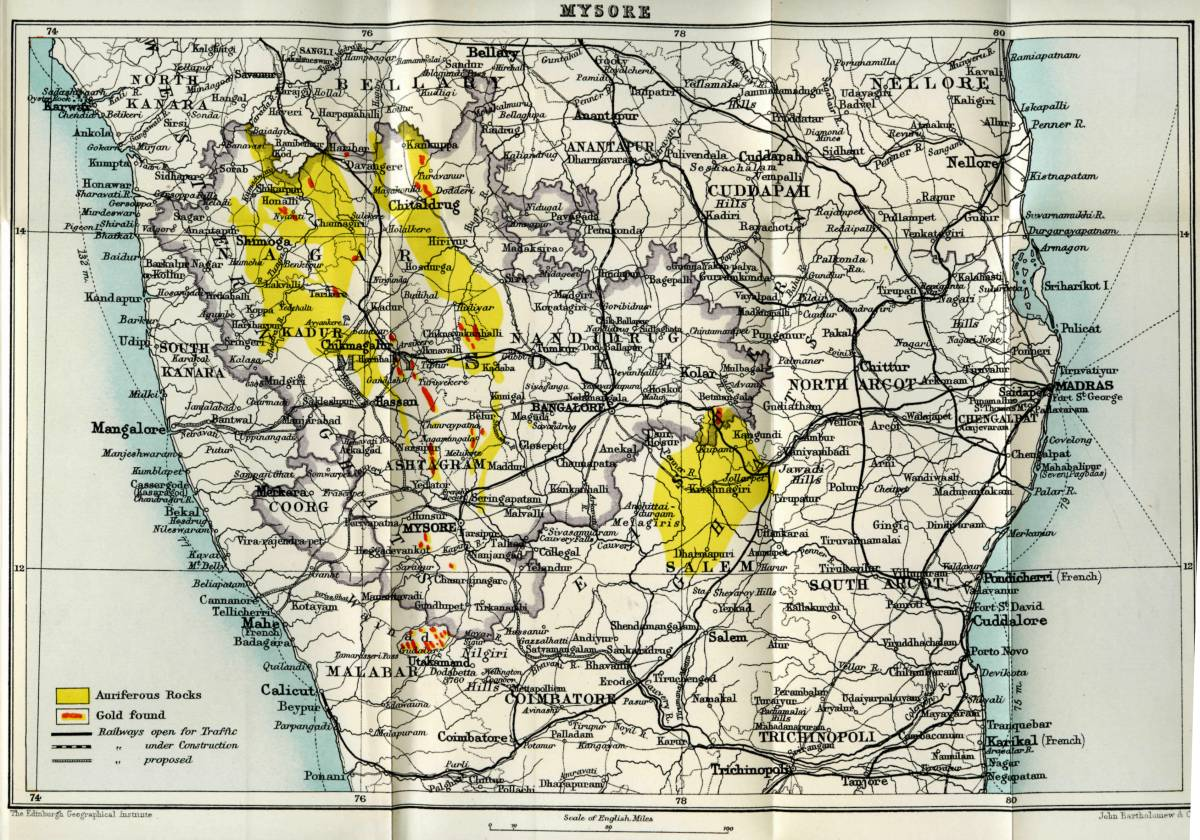
An old map of Parappanangadi on Malabar Coast during Mysore rule (Late 18th century CE)

The palace of the Kshatriya family of Parappanad Rajas is located at a short distance from Parappanangadi railway station. It was from this family that the consorts of the Rani's Travancore family were usually selected.

In 1425, the country was divided into Northern Parappanad (Beypore Swaroopam) and Southern Parappanad (Parappur Swaroopam).

The rulers of Parappanad Swaroopam were vassals to the Zamorins of Calicut. The rulers of Parappanad were one of the Kshatriya claiming lineages of medieval Kerala along with the neighbouring Vettathunad rulers and the Cochin Royal Family.

Parappanangadi was an important coastal town under the Zamorin rule and was one of the major trade centres of the medieval Kerala coast. Arab traders had the monopoly of trade until 15th century CE. In 1573, the Portuguese apparently burned down this town.

The schools built by Basel Evangelistic Mission (BEM) at Parappanangadi and Ponnani during colonial era, have their positions among the oldest modern schools in Kerala. During colonial period, Parappanangadi was placed under the Eranad Taluk of Malabar District. Later in 1957, it became a part of Tirur Taluk, when the Taluk was formed. In 1990's Parappanangadi became a part of the newly formed Tirurangadi Taluk.

=== Lakshmipuram Palace ===
Lakshmipuram Palace is the royal palace of the Parappanad royal families at Changanassery. Palace is located at Puzhavathu near to Kavil Bhagavathy Temple. The Lakshmipuram Palace was built in 1811 AD by Travancore ruler Maharani Ayilyom Thirunal Gouri Lakshmi Bayi (1791–1815) on behalf of the family of her husband Raja Raja Varma Valiya Koil Thampuran. Until then, the royal family at the Neerazhi Palace in Changanacherry had been moved to newly built Lakshmipuram Palace.

One of the royal families from Parappanad settled in Neerazhi Palace in the 18th century.

Raja Raja Varma Koil Thampuran, father of Travancore Maharaja Swathi Thirunal Rama Varma, was born in Neerazhi Palace in Changanassery. He was part of the royal family of erstwhile Parappanad (Parappangadi and Beypore), Malabar. Maharani Ayilyom Thirunal Gouri Lakshmi Bayi built a new palace in Changanassery for her husband and his family members during her reign in 1811, which was called Lakshmipuram Palace. Until then, the royal family lived in Neerazhi Palace at Puzhavathu.

=== Kilimanoor palace ===
In 1705 (ME 880), the son and two daughters of Ittammar Raja of Parappanad royal house were adopted into the Royal house of Venad. Ittammar Raja's sister and her sons, Rama Varma and Raghava Varma, settled in Kilimanoor and married the now adopted sisters. Marthanda Varma, the founder of the Kingdom of Travancore, was the son of Raghava Varma. The nephew of Raghava Varma, Ravi Varma Koil Thampuran, married the sister of Marthanda Varma. Their son was Dharma Raja Kartika Thirunnal Rama Varma.

In 1740, an army from Kilimanoor fought off and defeated an allied force led by Dutch Captain Hockert, who was supporting the Deshinganadu King in an attack on Venad. Although a small victory, this was the first time an Indian army had defeated a European power.

In 1753, in recognition of this feat, Marthanda Varma exempted the areas controlled by the Kilimanoor palace (most of the area under the present Kilimanoor and Pazhayakunnummel panchayats) from taxes, and granted them autonomous status.

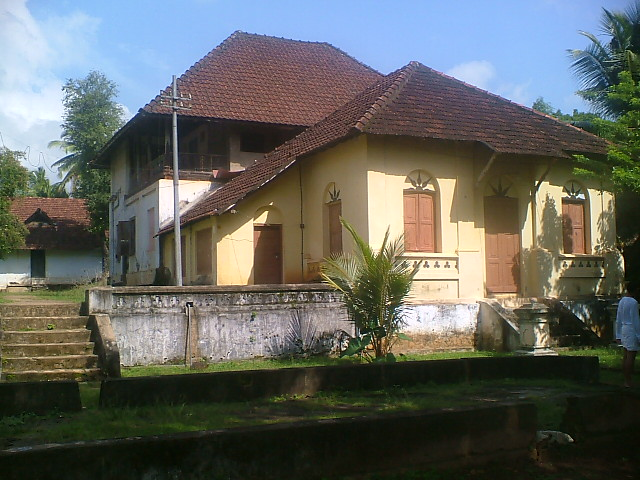
Birthplace of Raja Ravi Varma with his studio in the foreground.

== Civic administration ==
The town is administered by Parappanangadi Municipal Council, headed by a Chairman/Chairperson. For administrative purposes, the town is divided into 45 wards, from which the members of the municipal council are elected for a term of five years.

Parappanangadi Municipality

=== Parappanangadi Municipality Election 2020 ===
S.No.	Party name	Party symbol	Number of Councillors
01	UDF		27
02	Independents		09
03	LDF		06
04	BJP		03

== Municipal Council (2020-2025) ==
Chairman	PP SHAHUL HAMEED
Vice Chairperson	B.P SAHIDA
Standing Committee Chairman/Chairpersons
Finance Standing Committee Chairperson	B.P Sahida
Development Standing Committee Chairman	SUHARA VK
Welfare Standing Committee Chairperson	KP Muhsina
Health Standing Committee Chairperson	Khairunnisa Thahir
Public works Standing Committee Chairperson	Zeenath Alibappu A
Education, Art, Sports Standing Committee Chairman	C Nizar Ahammed
Councilors
KC NASAR
M. C. NASEEMA
K.K SAITHALAVIKOYA THANGAL
SUMIRANI O
KP RAMLA TEACHER
SUBRAHMANIAN
JAYADEVAN CHERUKUTTIYIL
RAMLATH KODALIKKODAN
A USMAN
KP MEREENA TEACHER
GIREESH CHALERI
FATHIMA RAHEEM
KHADEEJATHUL MARIYA
SAMEER M
SHAHINA SAMEER
NM SHAMEJ
AV HASSAN KOYA
ABDUL AZEEZ KOOLATH
KASMIKOYA CV
JAFARALI NECHIKKATT
HAREERA HASSAN KOYA
DEEPA
ABDUL RAZAK TR
MOHANDAS MASTER
JAINISHA MANNARAKKAL
UMMUKULSU
KUNNUMMAL JUBAIRIYATH
KARTHIKEYAN T
BABY ACHUTHAN
FOUSIYABI
ABDUL RAZAK T
FOUSIYA SIRAJ
MANJUSHA PRALOSH
P.V MUSTHAFA
SAITHALAVI AJYARAKATH
NASEEMA P.O
FOUSIYA MUHAMMED
SHAHARBANU K

=== Law and Order ===
The municipality comes under the jurisdiction of the Parappanangadi police station, which was formed on 22 June 1979. The station is located on Neduva area of Parappanangadi Municipality. The station has the jurisdiction over the municipality of Parappanangadi and the Gram panchayat of Vallikkunnu. (The 4 Revenue villages are Parappanangadi, Vallikkunnu, Neduva, and Ariyallur.)

The jurisdictional courts of Parappanangadi Police Station are Judicial First Class Magistrate Court Parappanangadi, Parappanangadi Munsiff Court, Subdivisional Magistrate Court Tirur, and Sessions Court Manjeri.

The border police stations are headquartered at Tenhipalam, Tanur, and Tirurangadi. Parappanangadi Police Station comes under the Tanur subdivision of Malappuram District Police, which is also one among six subdivisions of district police.

==== Important Courts at Parappanangadi ====
- Judicial First Class Magistrate Court - I, Parappanangadi
- Judicial First Class Magistrate Court - II, Parappanangadi
- Parappanangadi Munsiff Court

== Geography ==
Parappanangadi Municipality is bounded by Arabian Sea to west, Kadalundi River to east, Vallikkunnu Grama panchayat to north, and Tanur Municipality to south.

=== Keeranallur New Cut ===
Keeranallur New Cut river is located here. The Keeranallur New Cut Tourism Project, which falls under the Parappanangadi Municipality, had originally received administrative approval in 2023, was selected under the AMRUT project in 2025. The AMRUT project, which is implemented by the Central Government, received an administrative approval of Rs. 1.045 crore from the Local Government Department. As per a report in Manorama online, "the project includes a perimeter wall, landscaping, handrails, electrification, open stage, children's play area, paved walkway, granite seating, shade trees, and a happiness zone." Earlier, under the UDF government UDF government had allocated Rs. 1.5 crore had been allocated by the state government for the implementation of the New Cut Tourism Project but had been abandoned because of 'technical reasons'.

== Transportation ==
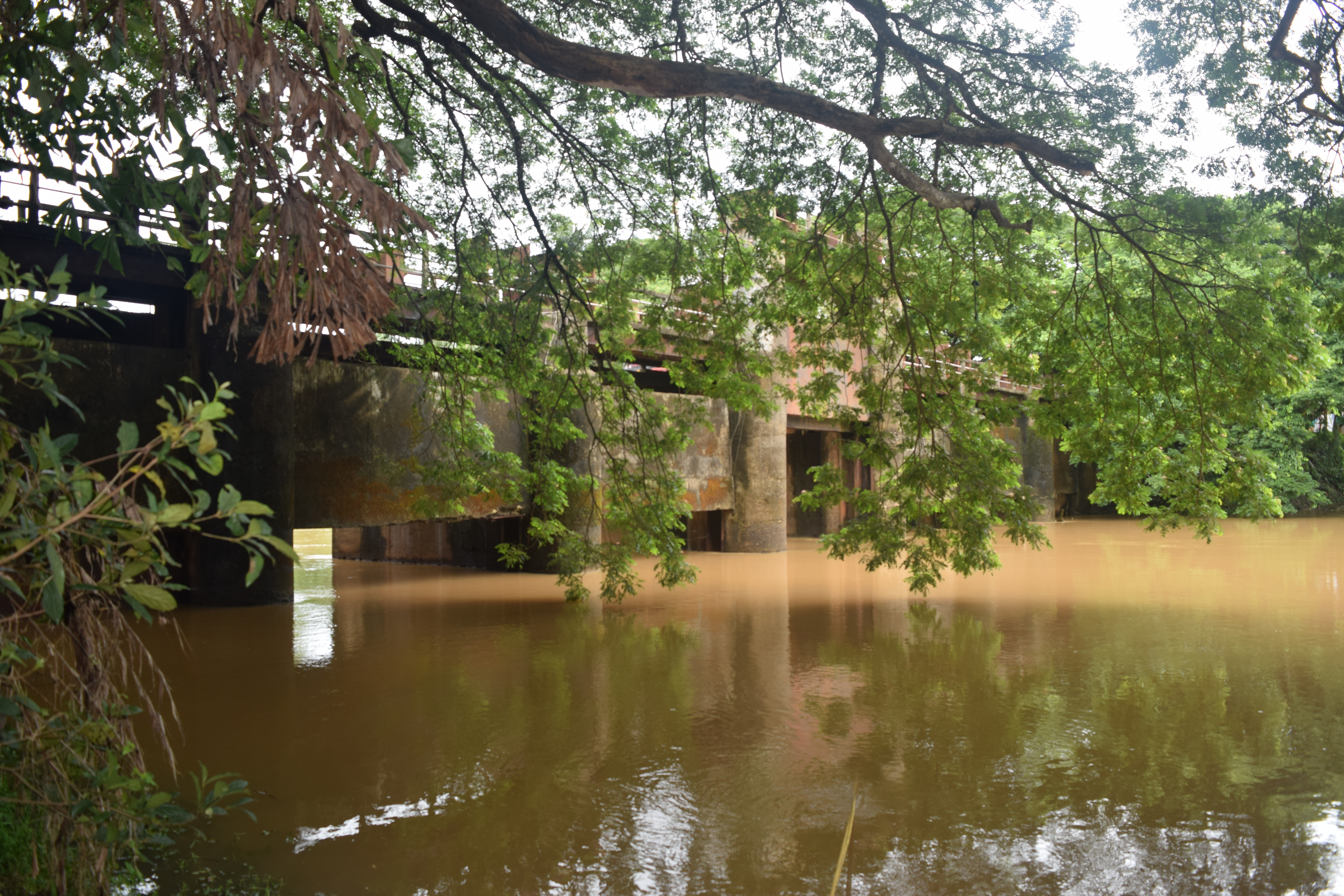
Palathingal bridge, Parappanangadi

The nearest airport is at Karipur. Parappanangadi has a railway station in the town. The nearest major railway station is at Tirur.

Nadukani-Parappanangadi Road connects the coastal area of Malappuram district with the easternmost hilly border at Nadukani Churam bordering Nilgiris district of Tamil Nadu, near Nilambur, passing through major towns such as Tirurangadi, Malappuram, Manjeri, and Nilambur.

Parappanangadi-Manjeri Road and Chettippadi-Chamravattam Road are two important roads starting/ending at Parappanangadi. Tirur-Kadalundi Tipu Sultan Road passes through the town.

== Wards of Parappanangadi ==
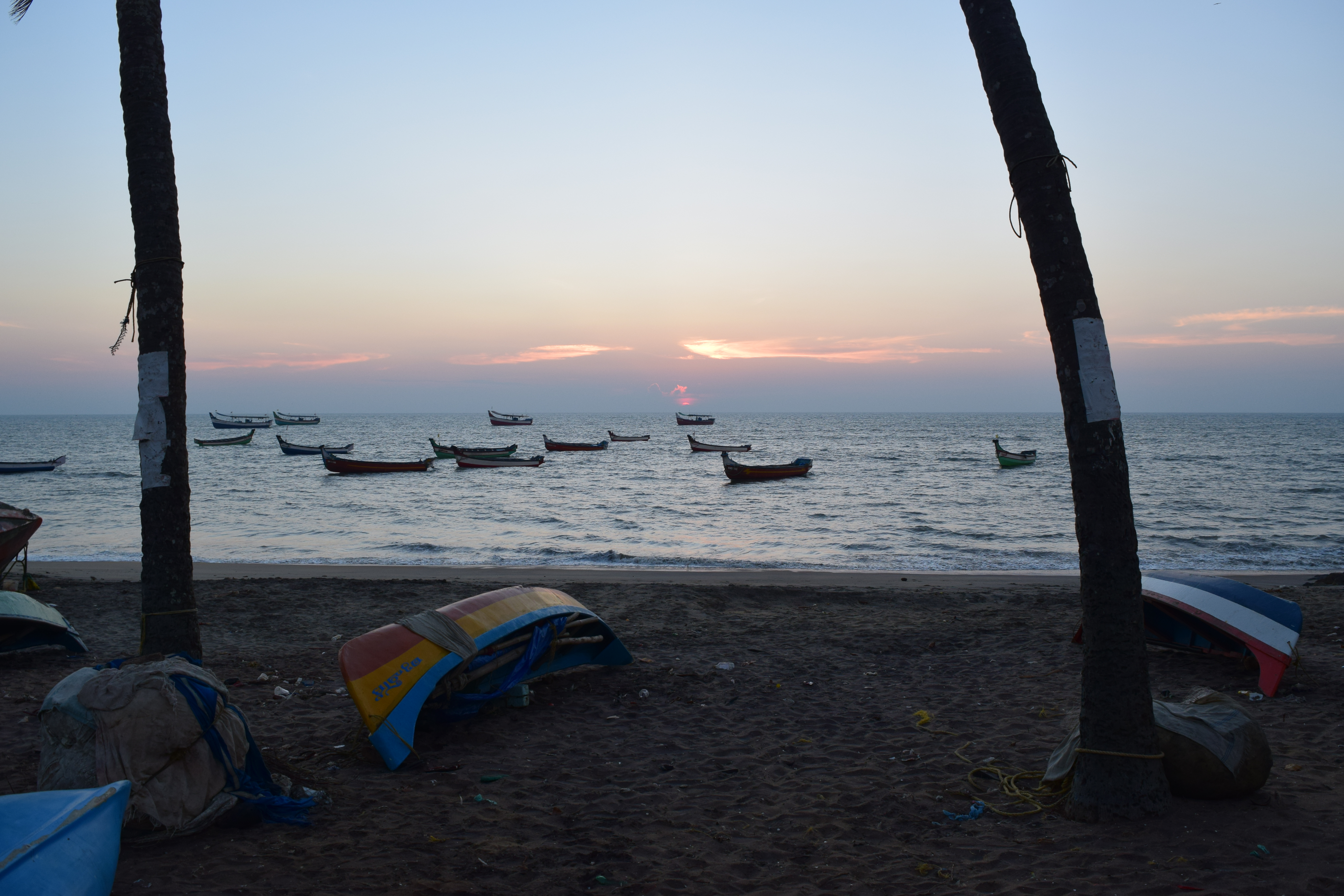
Parappanangadi Fishing Harbour

Parappanangadi Municipality is composed of the following 45 wards:

Ward no.	Name	Ward no.	Name
1	Vadakke Kadappuram	2	Laksham Veedu
3	Health Centre	4	Chettipadi East
5	Anappadi	6	Moduvingal
7	Keezhchira	8	Kovilakam
9	Ullanam Town	10	Ullanam North
11	Edathiruthikkadavu	12	Thayyilappadi
13	Panayathil	14	Putharikkal
15	Stadium	16	Attakuzhingara
17	Kalikavu	18	Karingallathani
19	Palathingal	20	Keezhanalloor
21	Kottanthala	22	Naseeb Nagar
23	Chiramangalam South	24	Chiramangalam
25	Uppunipuram	26	Aviyil Beach
27	Kurikkal Road	28	Puthen Kadappuram
29	Saddam Beach	30	Puthen Kadappuram South
31	NCC Road	32	Parappanangadi South
33	Parappanangadi Town	34	Puthen Kadappuram
35	Ottummal South	36	Chappappadi
37	Anjappura	38	Neduva
39	Kodappalli	40	Angadi
41	Yarathingal	42	Chengattupadam
43	Chettipadi	44	Alungal South
45	Alungal North		

== Notable individuals from Parappanangadi ==
- P. K Abdul Rabb ( Former Education Minister of Kerala)
- Kerala Varma Valiya Koyi Thampuran (Kerala Kalidasan)
- Raja Raja Varma (Kerala Panini)
- Raja Ravi Varma (Famous Painter are from different branches of Parappanad Raja Vamsam (Clan) which migrated to Harippad, Changanassery, Mavelikkara and Kilimanoor.)
- Marthanda Varma, the founder of Travancore, belongs to Parappanad royal family.
- C. Karunakara Menon, Renowned journalist, Former Chief Editor of the daily "The Hindu" (1898 to 1905), Founder Chief Editor of "The Indian Patriot", Social Thinker and Author of the book 'Observations on the Malabar Marriage Bill', Divan Bahadur Cozhisseri Karunakara Menon (1863–1922) was also from Parappanangadi. He was from Cozhisseri Tharavad of Parappanangadi.
- O. Chandu Menon wrote his novels "Indulekha" and "Saradha" while he was the judge at Parappanangadi Munciff Court. Indulekha is also the first Major Novel written in Malayalam language.
- Chalilakath Kunahmed Haji, a renowned Islamic scholar and reformist.
- K Avukaderkutty Naha (1920 - 1988), Long term Minister, Former Deputy Chief Minister and Muslim League Leader K Avukaderuktty Naha belonged to Kizhakkiniyath family of Parappanangadi.
- M.G.S Narayanan (1932 - ), Renowned Historian and former Chairman of Indian Council of Historical Research and former Member Secretary of Indian History Congress belongs to Muttayil Tharavad of Parappanangadi.
- Dr M. Gangadharan (1933 - 2022), Noted Historian, Literary Critic, Social Thinker and Publisher belonged to Muttayil Tharavad of Parappanangadi.
