= Parappanad =

Former feudal city-state

Parappanad was a former feudal city-state in Malabar, India. The headquarters of Parappanad Royal family was at the town Parappanangadi in present-day Malappuram district. In 1425, the country divided into Northern Parappanad (Beypore kingdom) and Southern Parappanad (Parappur Swarupam). Southern Parappanad included parts of Tirurangadi Taluk and the town Parappanangadi. Northern Parappanad (Beypore kingdom or Karippa Kovilakam) included Panniyankara, Beypore, and Cheruvannur of Kozhikkode Taluk. Parappanad royal family is a cousin dynasty of the Travancore royal family.

== History ==
Names, routes and locations of the Periplus of the Erythraean Sea (1st century CE)

The kingdom of Parappanad had right over the Vallikkunnu-Kadalundi-Chaliyam-Beypore region, which is often identified with the ancient maritime trading port of Tyndis, which was a major center of trade, next only to Muziris, between the Cheras and the Roman Empire, during Sangam period (1st-4th century CE). Pliny the Elder (1st century CE) states that the port of Tyndis was located at the northwestern border of Keprobotos (Chera dynasty). The North Malabar region, which lies north of the port at Tyndis, was ruled by the kingdom of Ezhimala during Sangam period. According to the Periplus of the Erythraean Sea, a region known as Limyrike began at Naura and Tyndis. However the Ptolemy mentions only Tyndis as the Limyrike's starting point. The region probably ended at Kanyakumari; it thus roughly corresponds to the present-day Malabar Coast. The value of Rome's annual trade with the region was estimated at around 50,000,000 sesterces. Pliny the Elder mentioned that Limyrike was prone by pirates. The Cosmas Indicopleustes mentioned that the Limyrike was a source of peppers.

According to the Legend of Cheraman Perumals, the first Indian mosque was built in 624 AD at Kodungallur with the mandate of the last ruler (the Cheraman Perumal) of Chera dynasty, who converted to Islam during the lifetime of Muhammad (c. 570–632). According to Qissat Shakarwati Farmad, the Masjids at Kodungallur, Kollam, Madayi, Barkur, Mangalore, Kasaragod, Kannur, Dharmadam, Panthalayini, and Chaliyam (just opposite to Vallikkunnu), were built during the era of Malik Dinar, and they are among the oldest Masjids in the Indian subcontinent. It is believed that Malik Dinar died at Thalangara in Kasaragod town. Chaliyam lies in Parappanad.

Parappanad Kingdom was a dependent of the Zamorin of Calicut. Parappanangadi was an important trade centre under the Zamorin, best known for the trade with Arab merchants during the medieval period. In the 16th century, Parappanad saw the Portuguese invasion. In 1573-74, Parappanangadi town was burnt by the Portuguese. In the middle of the 18th century, the Royal Family of the Parappanad Kingdom went to Travancore due to the invasion of Kingdom of Mysore. The Koyi Thampurans (aristocratic houses in Travancore who provided spouses for the Travancore princesses) are believed to be descendants of this lineage.

They were one of the Kshatriya claiming lineages of medieval Kerala along with the neighbouring Vettathunad rulers and the Cochin Royal Family. A major portion of the oldest railway line of Kerala laid in 1861 from Tirur to Chaliyam through Tanur, Parappanangadi, Vallikkunnu, and Kadalundi lies in Parappanad.

=== Lakshmipuram Palace ===
Lakshmipuram Palace is the royal palace of the Parappanad royal families at Changanassery. Parappanad was originally the ruling family of Parappanangadi in present-day Malappuram district. Palace is located at Puzhavathu near to Kavil Bhagavathy Temple. The Lakshmipuram Palace was built in 1811 AD by Travancore ruler Maharani Ayilyom Thirunal Gouri Lakshmi Bayi (1791–1815) on behalf of the family of her husband Raja Raja Varma Valiya Koil Thampuran. Until then, the royal family at the Neerazhi Palace in Changanacherry had been moved to newly built Lakshmipuram Palace.

One of the royal families from Parappanad settled in Neerazhi Palace in the 18th century.

Raja Raja Varma Koil Thampuran, father of Travancore Maharaja Swathi Thirunal Rama Varma, was born in Neerazhi Palace in Changanassery. He was part of the royal family of erstwhile Parappanad (Parappangadi and Beypore), Malabar. Maharani Ayilyom Thirunal Gouri Lakshmi Bayi built a new palace in Changanassery for her husband and his family members during her reign in 1811, which was called Lakshmipuram Palace. Until then, the royal family lived in Neerazhi Palace at Puzhavathu.

=== Kilimanoor palace and Travancore royal house ===
The estate of Kilimanoor originally belonged to a Pillai ruling chief and was forfeited to Travancore by Maharaja Marthanda Varma. The estate comprising several villages was then handed over to the family of the father of the King who had come south from Parappanad in Malabar around 1718.

=== Kilimanoor palace ===
In 1705 (ME 880) the son and two daughters of Ittammar Raja of Parappanad royal house were adopted into the Royal house of Venad. Ittammar Raja's sister and her sons, Rama Varma and Raghava Varma, settled in Kilimanoor and married the now adopted sisters. Marthanda Varma, the founder of the Kingdom of Travancore, was the son of Raghava Varma. The nephew of Raghava Varma, Ravi Varma Koil Thampuran, married the sister of Marthanda Varma. Their son became as Dharma Raja Kartika Thirunnal Rama Varma.

In 1740, when an allied force, led by Dutchman Captain Hockert supporting the Deshinganadu King, attacked Venad, an army from Kilimanoor resisted and then defeated them. Although a small victory, this was the first time an Indian army had defeated a European power. In 1753, in recognition of this feat, Marthanda Varma exempted the areas controlled by the Kilimanoor palace from taxes, and granted them autonomous status. The present palace complex was built at this time, together with the Ayyappa temple. for the family deity, Sastha or Ayyapan. Velu Thampi Dalawa held meetings at Kilimanoor palace while planning uprisings against the British. He handed over his sword at the palace before going into his final battle against the British, and India's first President, Dr Rajendra Prasad received this sword from the palace and it was kept in the National Museum in Delhi. Afterwards the sword was moved to the Napier Museum, Trivandrum.

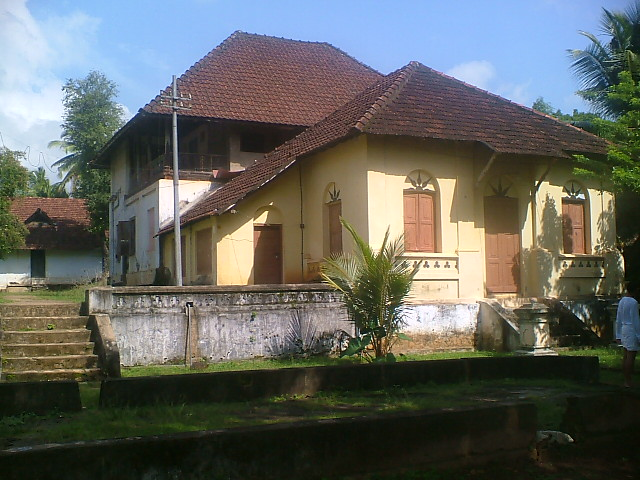
Birthplace of Raja Ravi Varma with his studio in the foreground
