= Neerazhi Palace =

Neerazhi Palace നീരാഴി കൊട്ടാരം
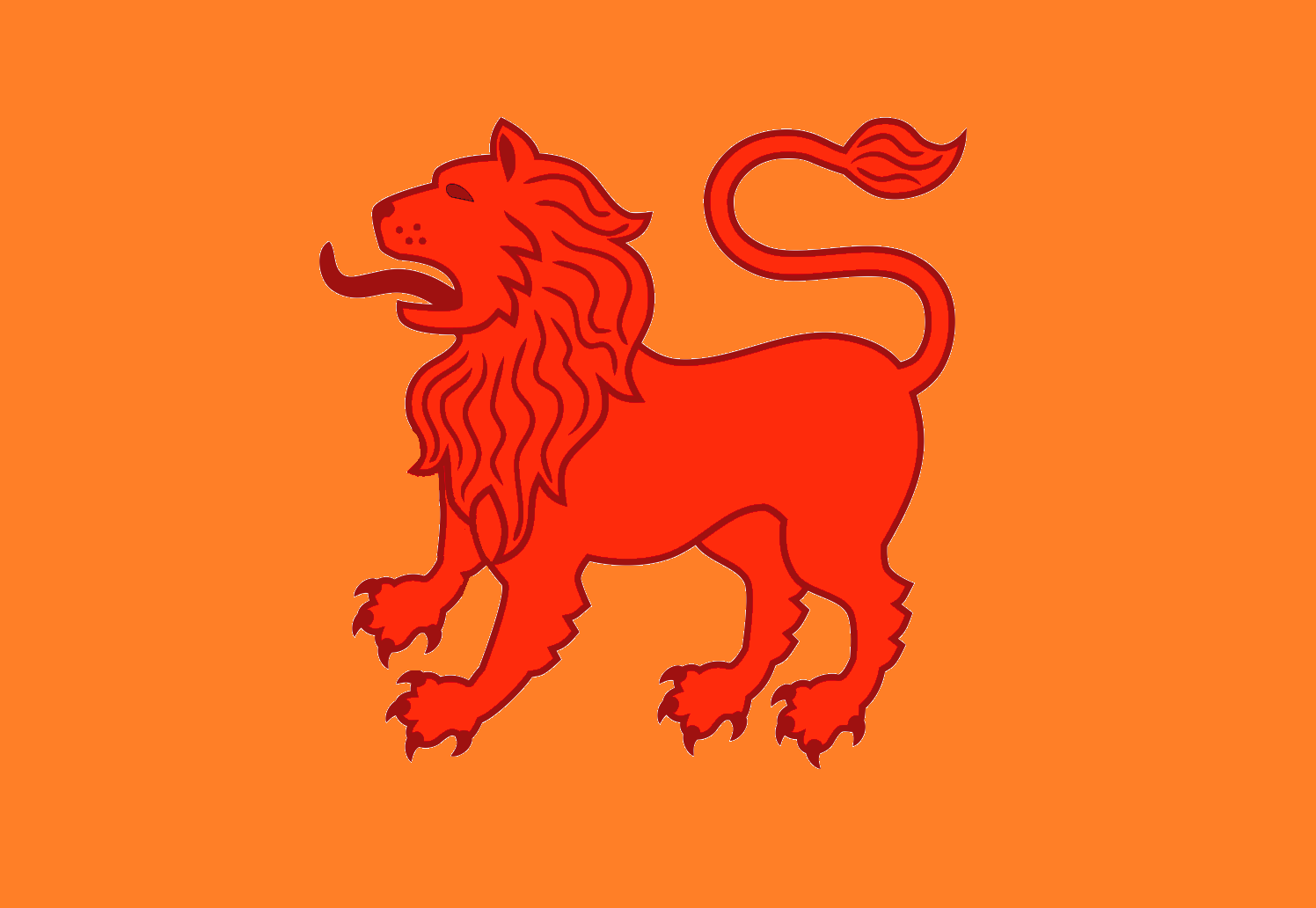
- Flag of Thekkumkur Dynasty

- Location within Kerala

General information
- Architectural style: Eattukettu; Architecture of Kerala Dravidiyan Style
- Location: Puzhavathu, Changanassery in Kottayam district, India
- Coordinates: 9.466667°N 76.55°E
- Construction started: 15th century
- Client: Kotha Varman Manikandan built in the 15th century (1408 - 1440 AD)

Technical details
- Structural system: Laterite stone, rubble, teak, rosewood and Angili wood
- Size: Originally 1.23 acres (0.50 ha)

Neerazhi Palace (Malayalam: നീരാഴി കൊട്ടാരം) was the royal palace of the Thekkumkur kingdom. Palace is located at Puzhavathu in Changanassery. The palace was used by the Thekkumkur dynasty until 1750 and later by the Parappanad dynasty who settled in Changanassery from Malabar Region (present-day Parappanangadi). It was here that the last king of Thekkumkur, Aditya Varman Manikandan escaped to Nattassery of Kottayam in the Travancore invasion of 1790 (Battle of Changanassery). The Neerazhi palace was earlier known as Neerazhikettu.

== Thekkumkur Kingdom ==
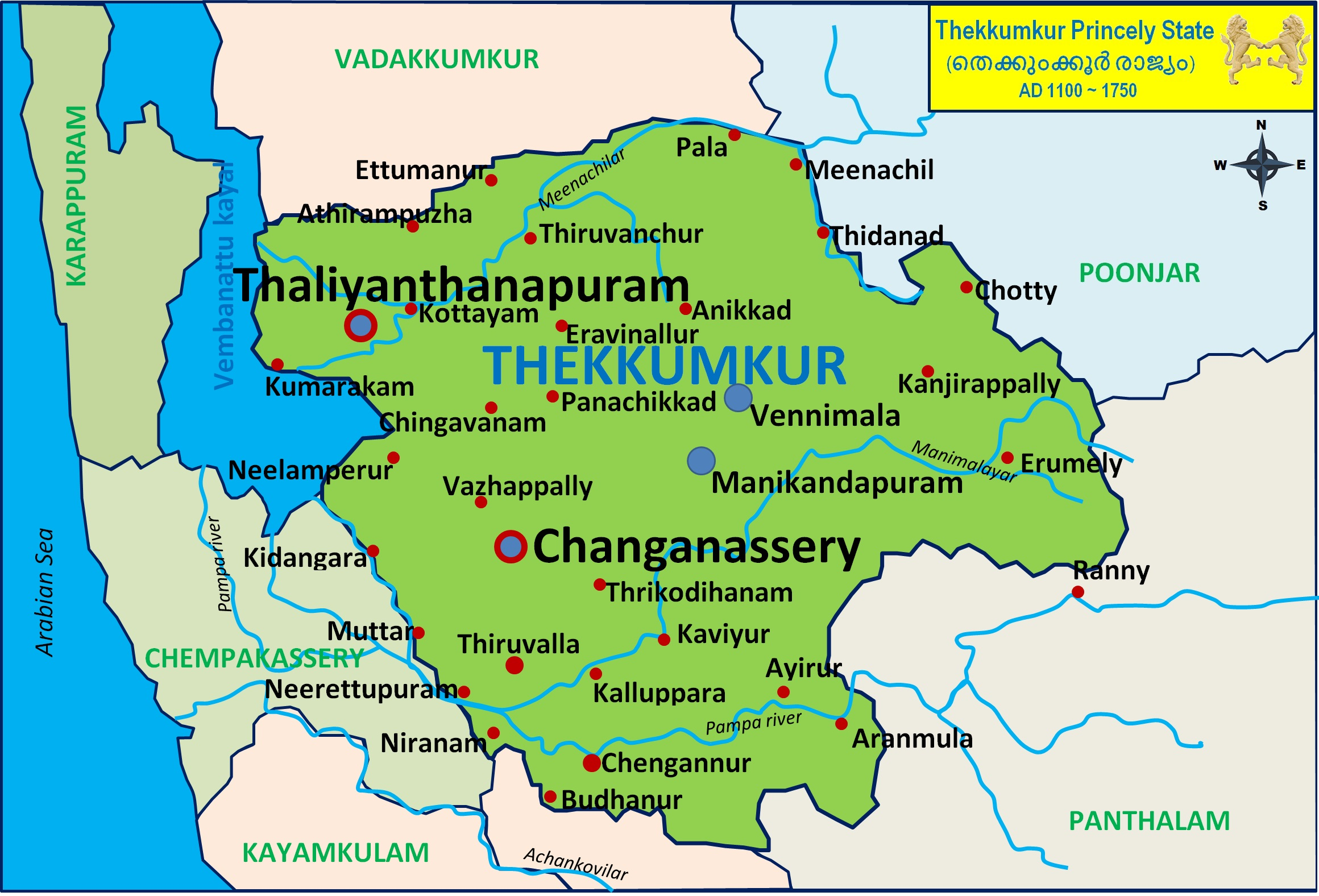
Thekkumkur Kingdom in 1750

In the early eighteenth century, the capital of Thekkumkur shifted to Puzhavathu in Changanassery after Vennimala, Manikandapuram and others. The last king of Thekkumkur was Aditya Verma Manikandan and he resided in the Neerazhi Palace at Puzhavathu. Thekkumkur army provided assistance to counter Travancore's invasion of princely state Champakassery (Purakkad) and Odanad (Kayamkulam). Realizing this, King Marthanda Varma decided to invade Thekkumkoor following the fall of Champakassery (Ampalapuzha). The Thekkumkur fort and the Neerazhi palace were attacked in September 1750 in the Battle of Changanassery by Travancore military. The Vazhappally Pathillathil Potimar (administrator of Vazhappally Maha Siva Temple) assisted the Thekkumkur king in the Neerazhi Palace and transferred him to Nattassery at Kottayam. After the Battle of Changanassery, the king was placed at Nattassery in Kottayam.

== The Architecture ==
The Neerazhi palace compound is 1.23 acres. The palace has been rebuilt after C.E.1400 and modified again by the Travancore kings in the 18th century after the Battle of Changanassery. After Anizham Thirunal Marthanda Varma overthrew the king of Thekkumkur (Aditya Varma Manikandan) in 1750, during the infamous raid of Hyder Ali in 1766, the palace used to house the fleeing princes and princes of the royal family of Parappanad of Malabar.

== Parappanad Royal Family ==
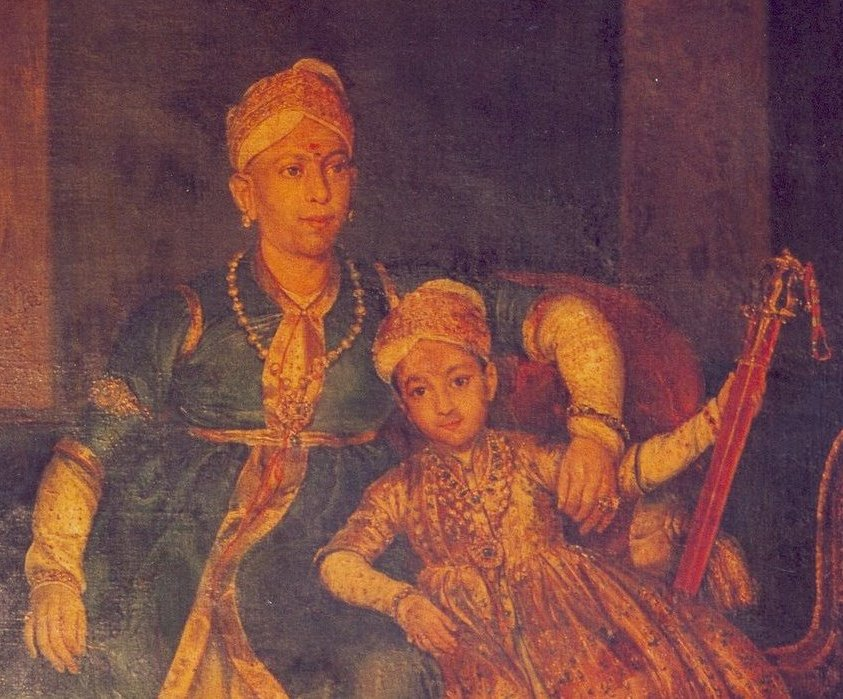
Raja Raja Varma & his son Swathi Thirunal at Neerazhi Palace

In 1788, when the king of Mysore, Tipu Sultan, invaded Malabar and destroyed the cities and temples and forcibly consolidated the Hindu religion, the Parappanad royal family fled to Travancore. One of the royal families from Parappanad settled in Neerazhi Palace in the 18th century.

Raja Raja Varma Koil Thampuran, father of Travancore Maharaja Swathi Thirunal Rama Varma, was born in Neerazhi Palace in Changanassery. He was part of the royal family of erstwhile Parappanad (Parappangadi and Beypore), Malabar. Maharani Ayilyom Thirunal Gouri Lakshmi Bayi built a new palace in Changanassery for her husband and his family members during her reign in 1811, which was called Lakshmipuram Palace. Until then, the royal family lived in Neerazhi Palace at Puzhavathu.
