= Gowri Rukmini Bayi =

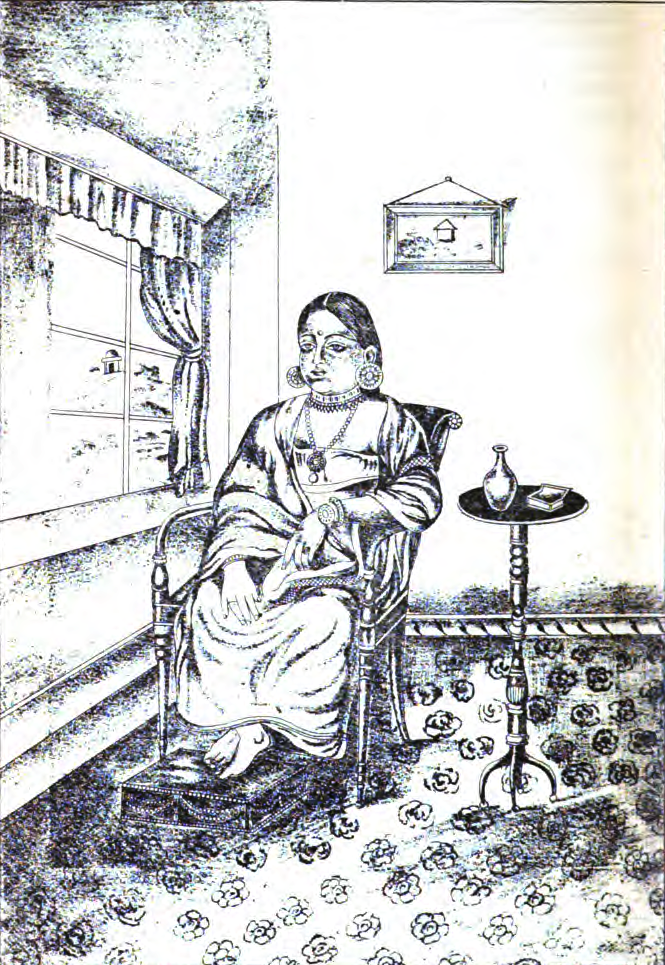
- Born: 1809
- Died: 1837 (aged 27–28)
- Spouse: Punartham Thirunal Rama Varma Koil Thampuran
- Issue: 7 including: Ayilyam Thirunal, Visakham Thirunal, Lakshmi Bayi
- Father: Raja Raja Varma Koil Thampuran
- Mother: Gowri Lakshmi Bayi
- Religion: Hinduism

Ayilyam Thirunal Gowri Rukmini Bayi was the Junior Maharani of Travancore styled Attingal Elaya Thampuran.

== Biography ==
Rukmini Bayi was born in 1809 to Gowri Lakshmi Bayi, Senior Rani of Attingal of the Travancore Royal Household and Raja Raja Varma Koil Thampuran. She had two younger brother Swathi Thirunal Rama Varma and Uthram Thirunal Marthanda Varma who both reigned Travancore. After the death of her mother she was primarily raised by her aunt, Gowri Parvati Bayi who was acting as regent of Travancrore for her younger brother, Swathi Thirunal.

Rukimini Bayi Was married to Punartham Thirunal Rama Varma Koil Thampuran. From this marriage she bore 7 children though only 4 lived to adulthood. Her eldest and third son were declared unfit to rule owing to mental incapacity. Thus her son Ayilyam Thirunal was chosen as her brother's heir and her youngest son Visakham Thirunal was selected as next in line after him. Her daughter succeeded her as Junior Maharani and became the mother of the future Maharaja Moolam Thirunal. As the sister of the reigning Maharaja and as the mother of the future king, throughout her lifetime Rukmini Bayi held the title of Junior Maharani of Travancrore, making her the Rani of Attingal as well.

== Title ==
Her Highness Sri Padmanabha Sevini Vanchipala Dyumani Raj Rajeshwari Maharani Ayilyam Thirunal Gowri Rukmini Bayi, Junior Maharani of Travancore.
