= Lakshmipuram Palace =

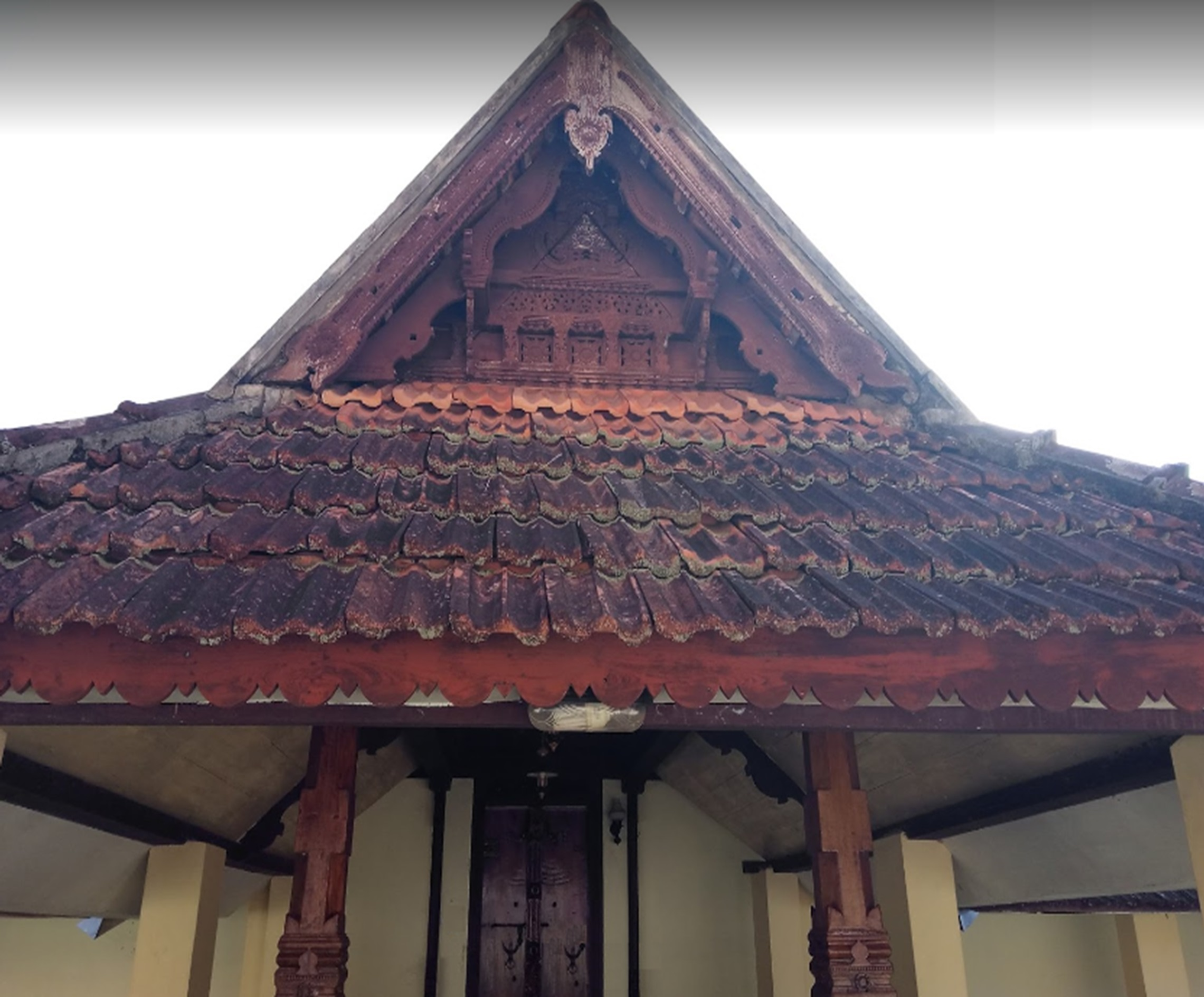
- The entrance

- Location within Kerala

General information
- Architectural style: Eattukettu; Architecture of Kerala Dravidiyan Style
- Location: Puzhavathu, Changanassery in Kottayam district, India
- Coordinates: 9.4400806°N 76.5358626°E
- Construction started: 1810
- Completed: 1811
- Client: Maharani Ayilyom Thirunal Gouri Lakshmi Bayi

Technical details
- Structural system: Laterite stone, rubble, teak wood

Design and construction
- Architect: Engineer of Travancore

Lakshmipuram Palace is the royal palace of the Parappanad royal families at Changanassery. Palace is located at Puzhavathu near to Sree vaikunteswara santhana gopala moorthi Temple. The Lakshmipuram Palace was built in 1811 AD by Travancore ruler Maharani Ayilyom Thirunal Gouri Lakshmi Bayi (1791–1815) on behalf of the family of her husband Raja Raja Varma Valiya Koil Thampuran. Until then, the royal family at the Neerazhi Palace in Changanacherry had been moved to newly built Lakshmipuram Palace. It was the seat of the royal family of Koi thampurans and has produced many illustrious writers such as Raja Raja Varma Koil Thampuran, Kerala Varma Valiya Koil Thampuran and A. R. Raja Raja Varma. Noted Malayalam singer and classical musician L. P. R. Varma also hails from this palace.

== Construction background ==
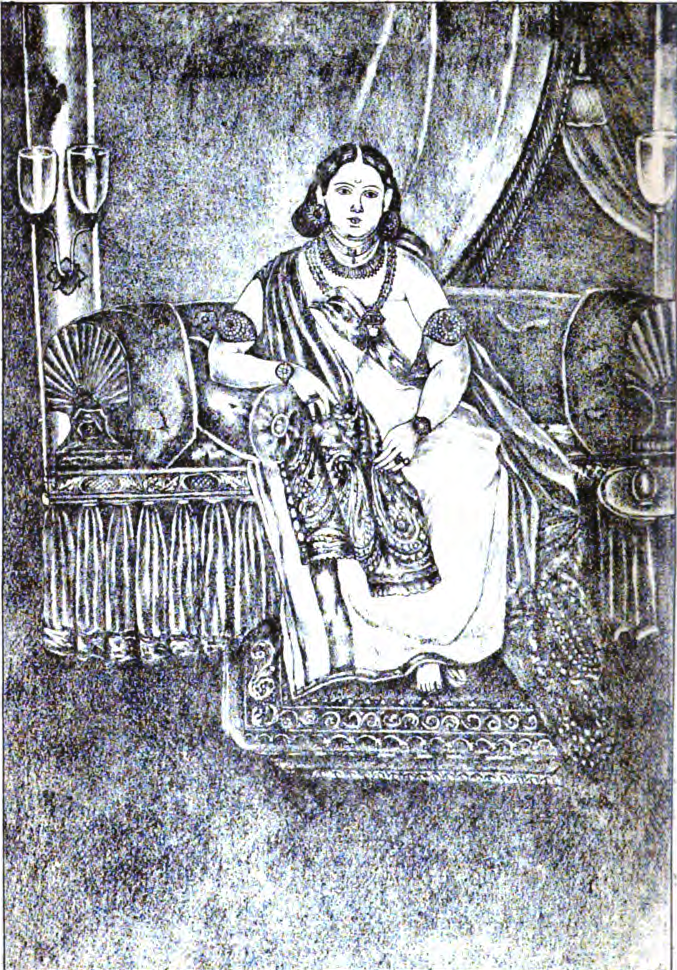
Gauri Lakshmi Bayi

In the late 18th century, after the invasion of Malabar by Hyder Ali, Kunjikutty Thamburatty of the Aliyakode swarupam (Parappanad swarupam) branch took refuge with his five daughters in Travancore in the period of Dharma Raja Karthika Thirunal Rama Varma. The then Maharaja Travancore gave the Neerazhi Palace belonged to the Thekkumkur dynasty. Later, the elder daughters of Kunjikutty Thampuratty built their own palaces in Thiruvalla and Pallam. The youngest daughter, Injaniamma settled down in Changanassery at Neerazhi Palace. Koyil Thampuran was the title of the Prince consorts of the Queens and Princesses of Travancore royal family. The Koyil Thampuran gained prominence and prestige in Kingdom of Travancore as they were the fathers of the then reigning Kings. Who settled in the Neerazhi Palace from the Parappanad dynasty was one of the ancient clan of Koil Thampuran. Injaniamma's grandson was Raja Raja Varma Koil Thampuran, who married Maharani Ayilyom Thirunal Gouri Lakshmi Bayi of Travancore. In 1811, under the direction of Maharani Lakshmi Bai, a new palace was constructed in Changanassery for her husband's family. This was later known as the Lakshmipuram Palace. The son of this couple is the Maharaja Swati Thirunal, a famous musician and lyricist who ruled Travancore from 1828 to 1846.

== Famous Members ==
Personalities born in Lakshmipuram Palace

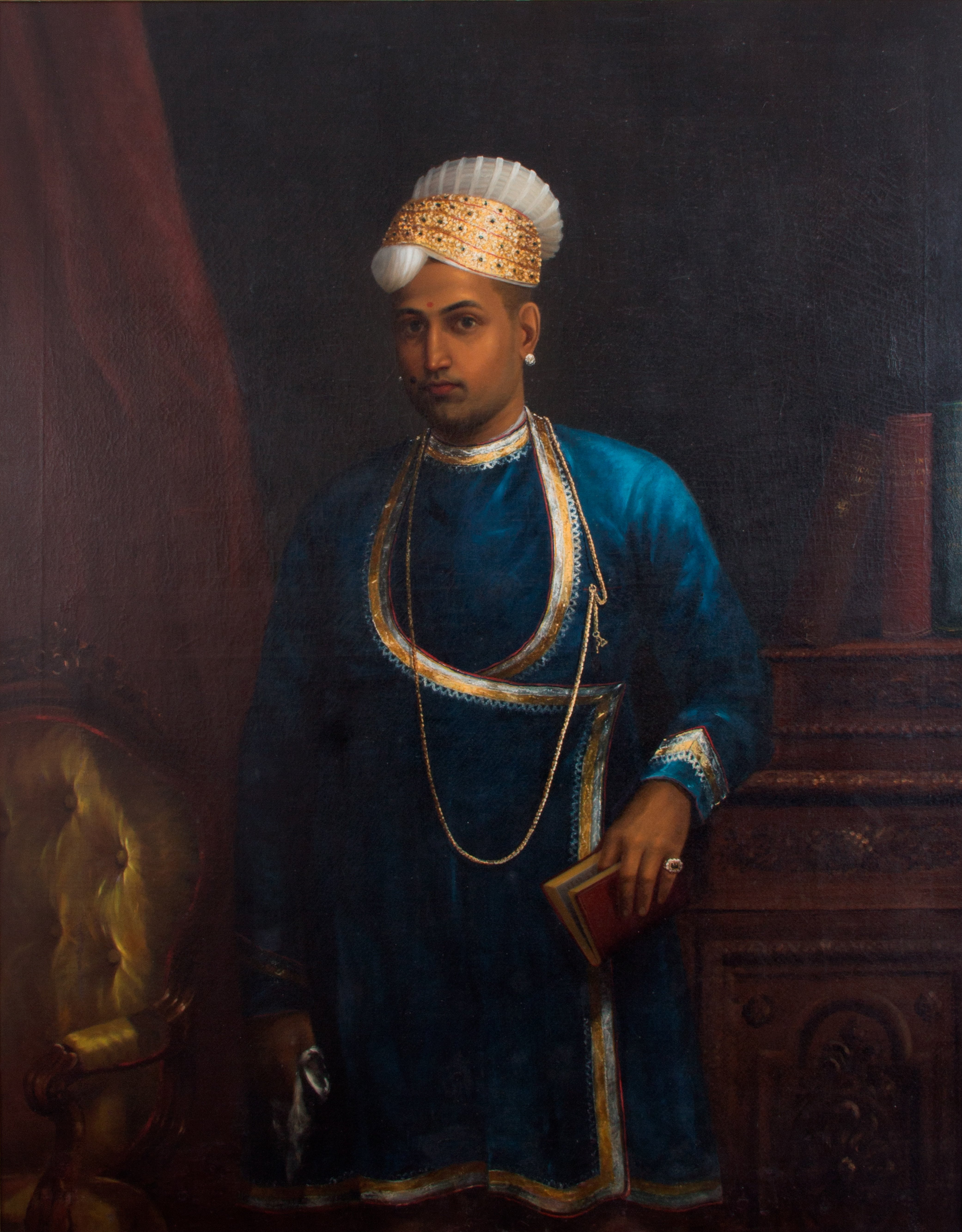
Kerala Varma Valiya Koil Thampuran (1845)

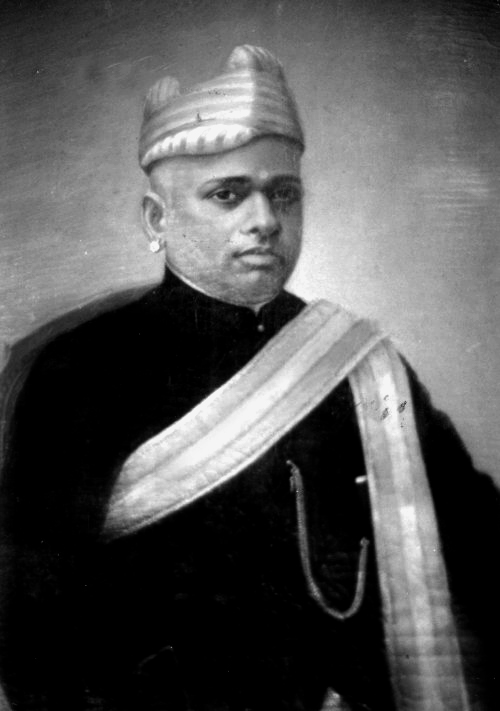
A. R. Raja Raja Varma (1863)

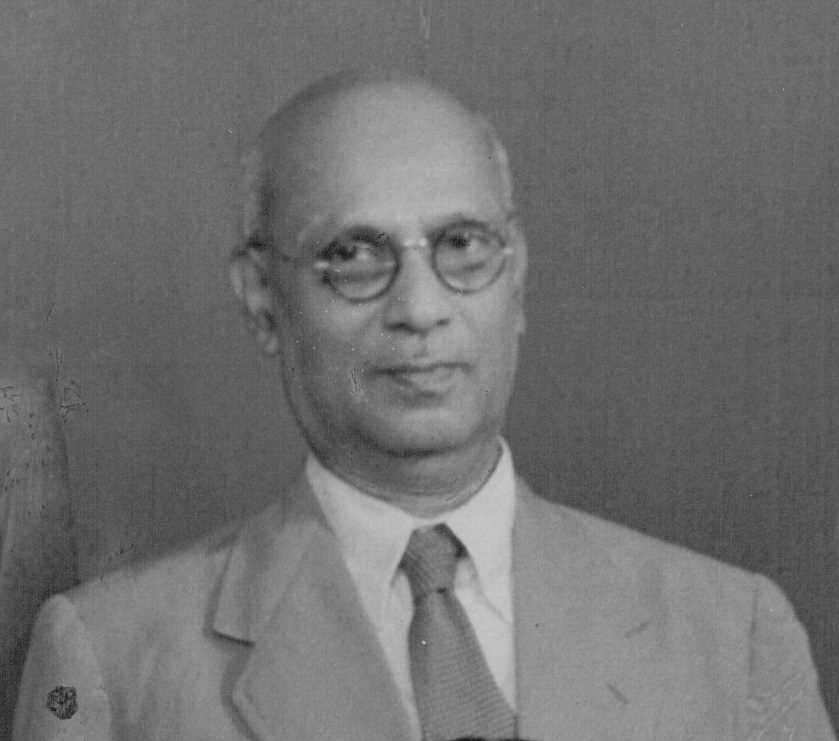
Dr. L. A. Ravi Varma (1884)

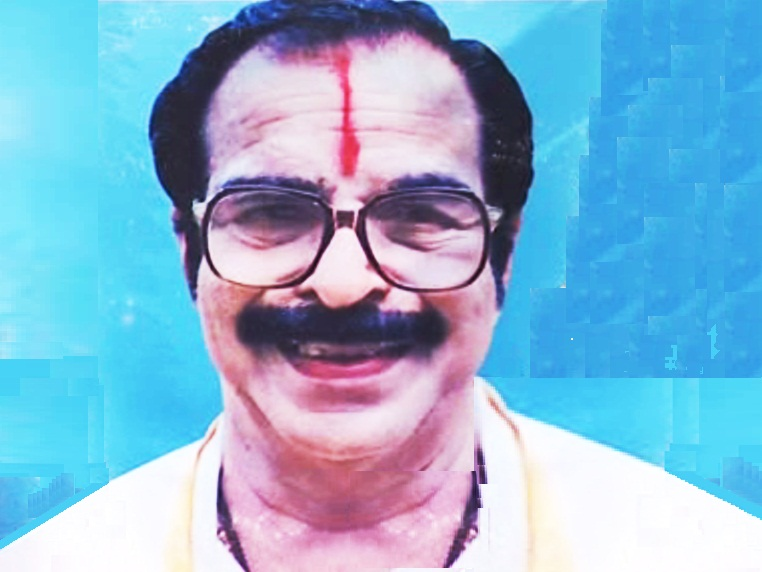
L. P. R. Varma (1927)
- Kerala Varma Valiya Koil Thampuran (Poet, Sanskrit scholar)
- A. R. Raja Raja Varma (Poet, Sanskrit scholar, Teacher)
- Kerala Varma Koil Thampuran (Sanskrit scholar)
- Ravi Varma Koil Thampuran (Poet)
- Dr. L. A. Ravi Varma (doctor, writer)
- L. P. R. Varma (poet, singer, Music director)
- L. Prathapa Varma (All India Radio))
- Ajoy Varma Raja (Film director)

== See also ==
- Aranmula Mangattu Palace
