= Kuthiramalika =

Building in India

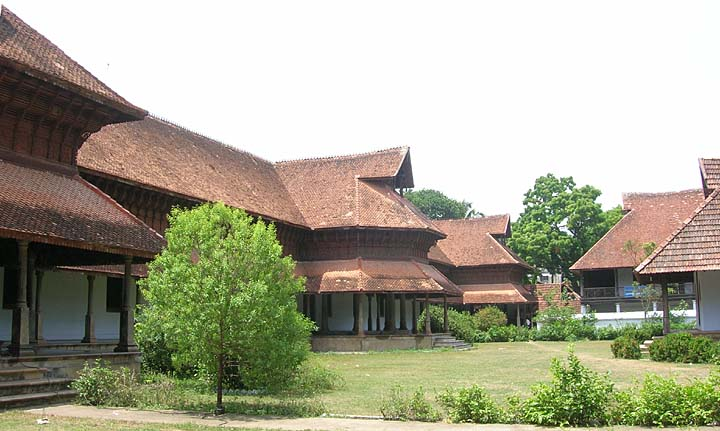

General information
- Architectural style: Kerala Architecture
- Location: Thiruvananthapuram, Kerala, India
- Year built: 1840s

Other information
- Number of rooms: 80

Kuthiramalika (lit. 'Mansion of horses') is a Travancore Kingdom palace built by Swathi Thirunal Rama Varma on the south-eastern side of Padmanabhaswamy temple, Thiruvananthapuram. Kuthira Malika translates to 'Mansion of horses', and it has been named so because of the 122 horses that adorn the many pillars that support the southern roof of this majestic structure.

== Etymology ==
The palace gets its name from the 122 horses that are carved into the wooden wall brackets that support the southern roof. The official name of the palace is Puthen Malika (New Mansion). The palace forms part of a vast complex of royal buildings in the vicinity of Padmanabhaswamy Temple. The building was left unoccupied for more than a century, following the demise of Swathi Thirunal in 1846.

== Architecture ==
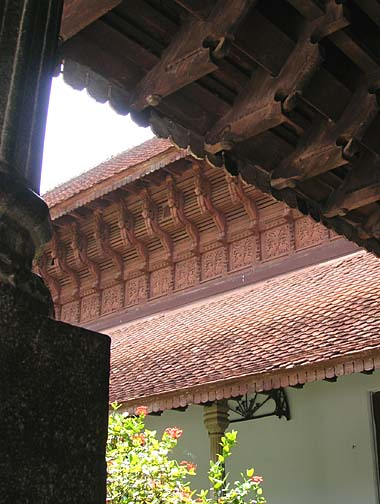
A view of the 'horses' at Kuthiramalika

Built in the 1840s, Kuthiramalika is an example of traditional Kerala architecture, with its typical sloping roofs, overhanging eaves, pillared verandahs and enclosed courtyards. Intricate carvings adorn the wooden ceilings, with each room having a distinctive pattern. The construction of the palace was completed by 5000 Vishwakarmas in four years. The palace is made from teakwood, rosewood, marble, and granite. The roof of the palace is made of wood and 42 beams support the carved patterns. The roof is supported by granite pillars. Floral motifs dot the ceiling of the verandah. The main 16 rooms of the palace are constructed in 16 different patterns. In all, the palace contains 80 rooms, of which 20 were opened for visitors in 1995. The floor inside the palace is made of egg whites, charcoal, and limestone, which make it cold and smooth even in hot weather conditions. The concert venue built in the palace premises uses traditional sound reflectors comprising fifty clay pots hung upside down from the ceiling.

=== Museum ===
A portion of Kuthiramalika has been converted to a Palace Museum that houses some of the assets owned by the Travancore Royal Family. Although 80 rooms are there in the palace, only 20 are open for visitors. A guided tour is available inside the palace. The palace collections include 14 life-size Kathakali mannequins, Belgian and Italian mirrors, crystal chandeliers, paintings, a giant Belgian harpoon, armaments, musical instruments, traditional furniture, greek statues, a musical tree which produces 8 sounds on tapping, and other artifacts. On the right side of the mannequins are the ivory cradles of various sizes. The palace has on display two royal thrones, one made from 24 elephant tusks (Dantasimhasana) and the other of Bohemian crystal with the Tranvancore emblem 'conch' adorning the top of the backrest. The palace has a large collection of idols and sculptures made from white marble.

On the first floor are rooms that once served as the audience chamber, the library and an alcove that Swathi Thirunal used for meditating and for conceiving many of his famous musical compositions. This place offers a direct view of the Padmanabhaswamy temple gopuram. The small wooden stair there contains carvings of peacock, elephant, and dragon. Ceiling of the rooms contain paintings of parrot, peacock, and elephant. One of the rooms displays an illusion portrait of Sree Chithira Thirunal Balarama Varma, painted by Svetoslav Roerich. The face and the shoes of the king appear facing the onlooker from every corner of the room.

== Swathi Sangeethotsavam ==
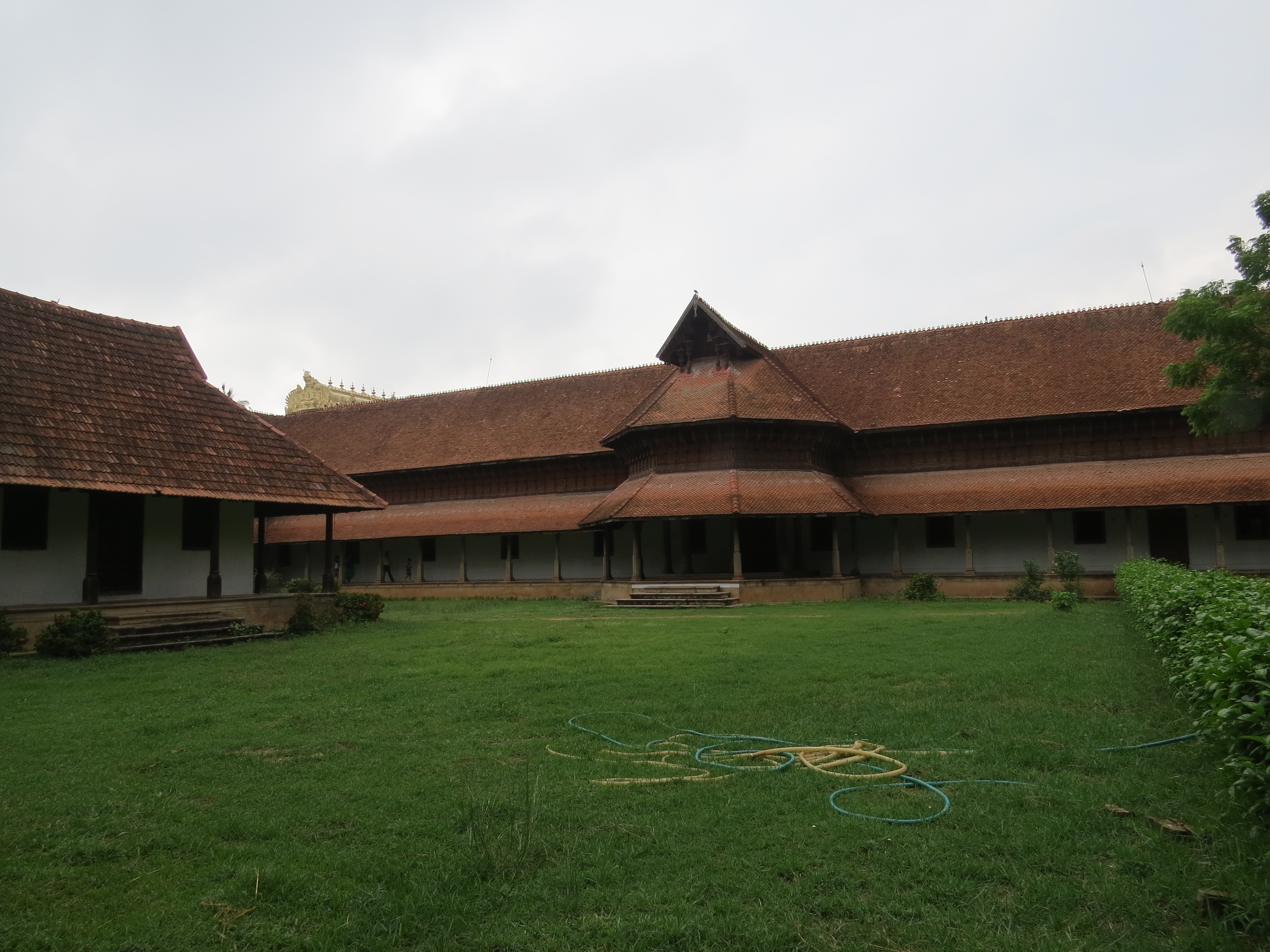

The courtyard of Kuthiramalika is the venue for Swathi Sangeethotsavam (also known as Kuthiramalika Festival), a yearly music festival commemorating the legacy of Swathi Thirunal. This music festival is conducted from 6 to 12 January every year. It attracts many of the leading stalwarts of Carnatic and Hindustani classical music. Some of the famous performers of the past include Bismillah Khan, Kishori Amonkar, M. Balamuralikrishna, D. K. Pattammal, and Gangubai Hangal.

== In films ==
The Kuthiramalika palace has been visualized in many Malayalam films. It was also mentioned in the famous TV show The Big Bang Theory in S11 E03: The Relaxation Integration.

== See also ==
- List of festivals in India
