= Marthanda Varma II =

Maharaja of Travancore from 1846 to 1860

Uthram Thirunal Marthanda Varma
- Maharaja of Travancore
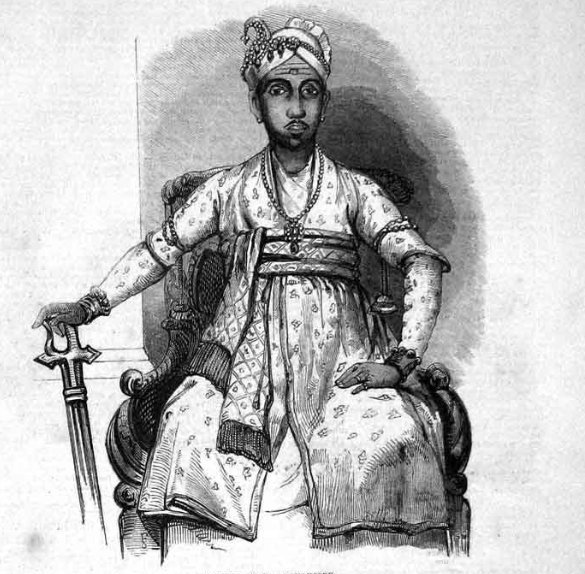
- Reign: 27 December 1846 – 18 August 1860
- Coronation: 28 December 1846
- Predecessor: Swathi Thirunal
- Successor: Ayilyam Thirunal
- Born: 26 September 1814
- Died: 18 August 1860 (aged 46)
- Consort: Nagercoil Ammachi Panapillai Amma Srimathi Madhavi Pillai Kochamma
- Issue: Ammachi panipillai sreemathi madhavi pillai lakshmi pillai kochamma(wife of ayilyam thirunal)
- House: Venad Swaroopam
- Dynasty: Kulasekhara
- Father: Changanassery Lakshmipuram Palace's Raja Raja Varma Valiya Koyil Thampuran
- Mother: Gowri Lakshmi Bayi
- Religion: Hinduism

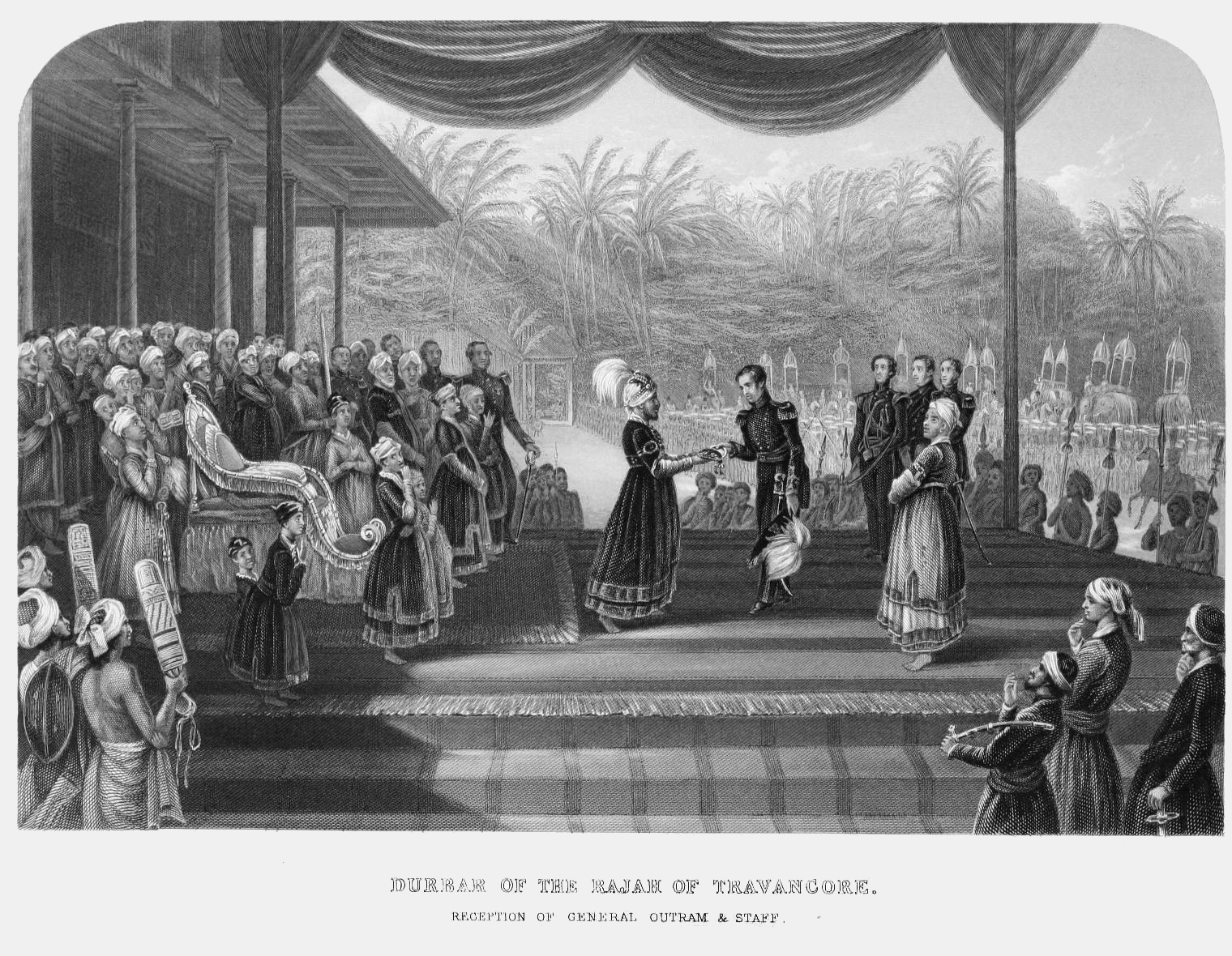
A sketch showing William Cullen carrying a letter from Queen Victoria to the King of Travancore thanking the latter for his contributions to the Great Exhibition of 1851 which included the gift of a carved ivory throne

Uthram Thirunal Marthanda Varma (26 September 1814 – 18 August 1860) was the Maharajah of Travancore state in southern India, succeeding his elder brother King Swathi Thirunal in 1846 till his demise in 1860. Known for his progressive rule, he abolished slavery in the kingdom. He was succeeded by his nephew King Ayilyam Thirunal in 1860. His mother Queen Gowri Lakshmi Bayi. He had three wives. The King's daughter was married by his nephew and heir King Ayilyam Thirunal.

The King also adopted Bharani Thirunal Lakshmi Bayi and Bharani Thirunal Parvathi Bayi from the related Kolathiri royal house in 1857 after the death of his niece to perpetuate the royal line.

The King was a pioneer in the introduction of modern medicine in Kerala.He himself was trained in medicine and other sciences by tutors he appointed.As it was considered taboo at that time for the members of the royal family to touch human remains, king was barred from studying osteology with real bones and for bypassing this, he had ivory bone sets carved. He also ran a laboratory and a modern medicine dispensary inside the palace, where he would diagnose and treat palace staff.

The king was also a renowned Kadhakali scholar and afficiando, with numerous Kadhakali poems (Aatta Kadhas) to his credit as author.

The King was also responsible for recovering and documenting the Kottayam Coin Hoard, a significant find of Julio-Claudian Roman aurei found in the district of Kottayam in 1851.

== See also ==
- Swathi Thirunal
- Travancore
- Gowri Lakshmi Bayi
- T Madhava Rao

== Sources ==
- Aiya, V.Nagam. Travancore State Manual.
- Pillai, T. K. Velu (1996). Travancore State Manual. Vol. II (2 ed.). Archived from the original on 7 May 2006.
- Menon, Shungunny. History of Travancore.

Marthanda Varma II Kulasekhara Dynasty Born: 26 September 1814 Died: 18 August 1860
Regnal titles
Preceded by Swathi Thirunal	Maharaja of Travancore; 1846–1860	Succeeded by Ayilyam Thirunal
