= Raja Raja Varma Koil Thampuran =

Indian writer

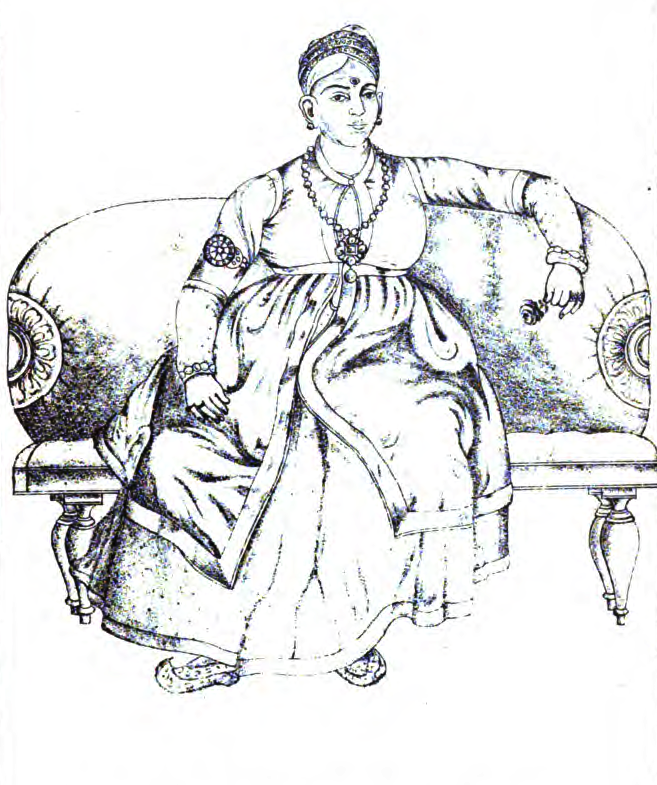
Raja Raja Varma Koil Thampuran Changanassery Lakshmipuram Palace

Raja Raja Varma Koil Thampuran, also known as Raja Raja Varma, was a Malayalam language poet and translator from the Indian state of Kerala who had an equal facility in writing in English and Sanskrit. He was born in Neerazhi Palace, Changanassery. He was part of the royal family of erstwhile Parappanad (Parappangadi and Beypore), Malabar. He was the Koyi Thampuran (Prince Consort) of Gowri Lakshmi Bayi.

== Life ==
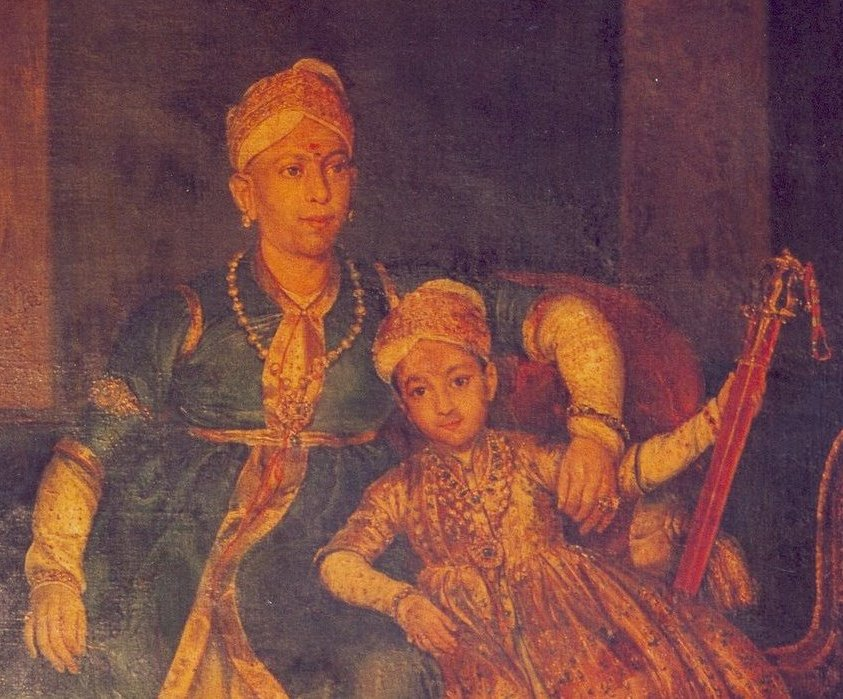
Raja Raja Varma & his son Swathi Thirunal

He was born in Changanacherry at the Neerazhi Palace, which is now known as Neerazhikettu kottaram. He married Princess Ayiliam Thirunal Gauri Lakshmi Bayi of Travancore. From this marriage Raja Raja Varma Koil Thampuran had issue, a daughter and two sons. His daughter was Maharani Gowri Rukmini Bayi, who was born in 1809. His eldest son, the famous Maharajah Swathi Thirunal, was born on 16 April 1813. Swathi Thirunal became a musician and artist and ruled independently from 1829 to 1846. Thampuran next had a son in 1814, Maharajah Uthram Thirunal, who ruled from 1846 to 1860. His wife Gauri Lakshmi Bayi lost her health after giving birth to Uthram Thirunal and died in 1815.

== Lakshmipuram Palace ==
Gauri Lakshmi Bayi built a new palace in Changanassery for her husband and his family members during her reign, which was called Lakshmipuram Palace.
