= Puzhavathu =

- neighbourhood
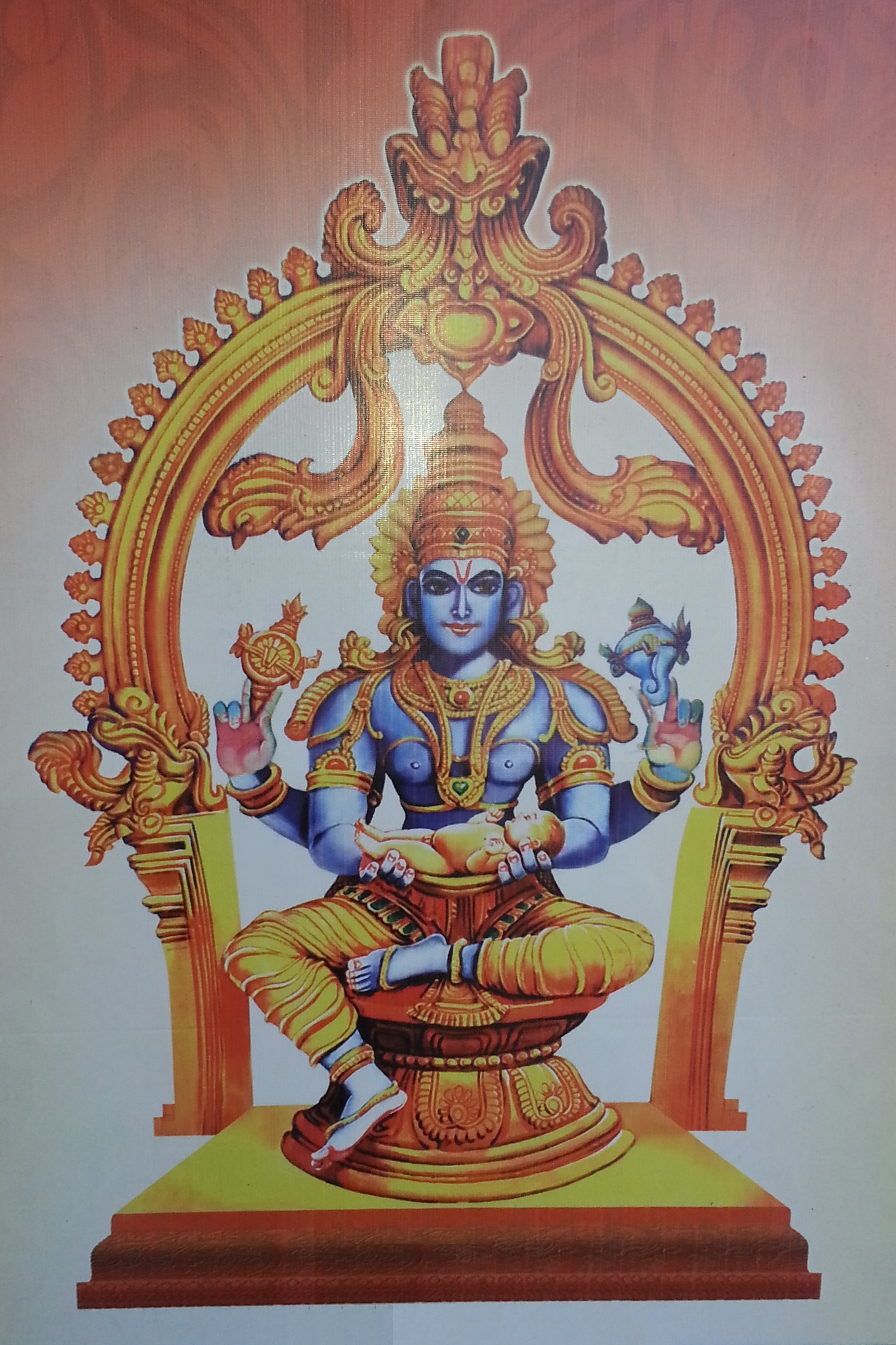
- Santhana Gopala Murthy
- Country: India
- State: Kerala
- District: Kottayam

Languages
  - Official: Malayalam, English
- Time zone: UTC+5:30 (IST)
- Vehicle registration: KL-33

Puzhavathu is a neighbourhood in Changanasserry, in Kerala state. It is 1 km from Changanasserry bus stand and 2.5 km from railway station.

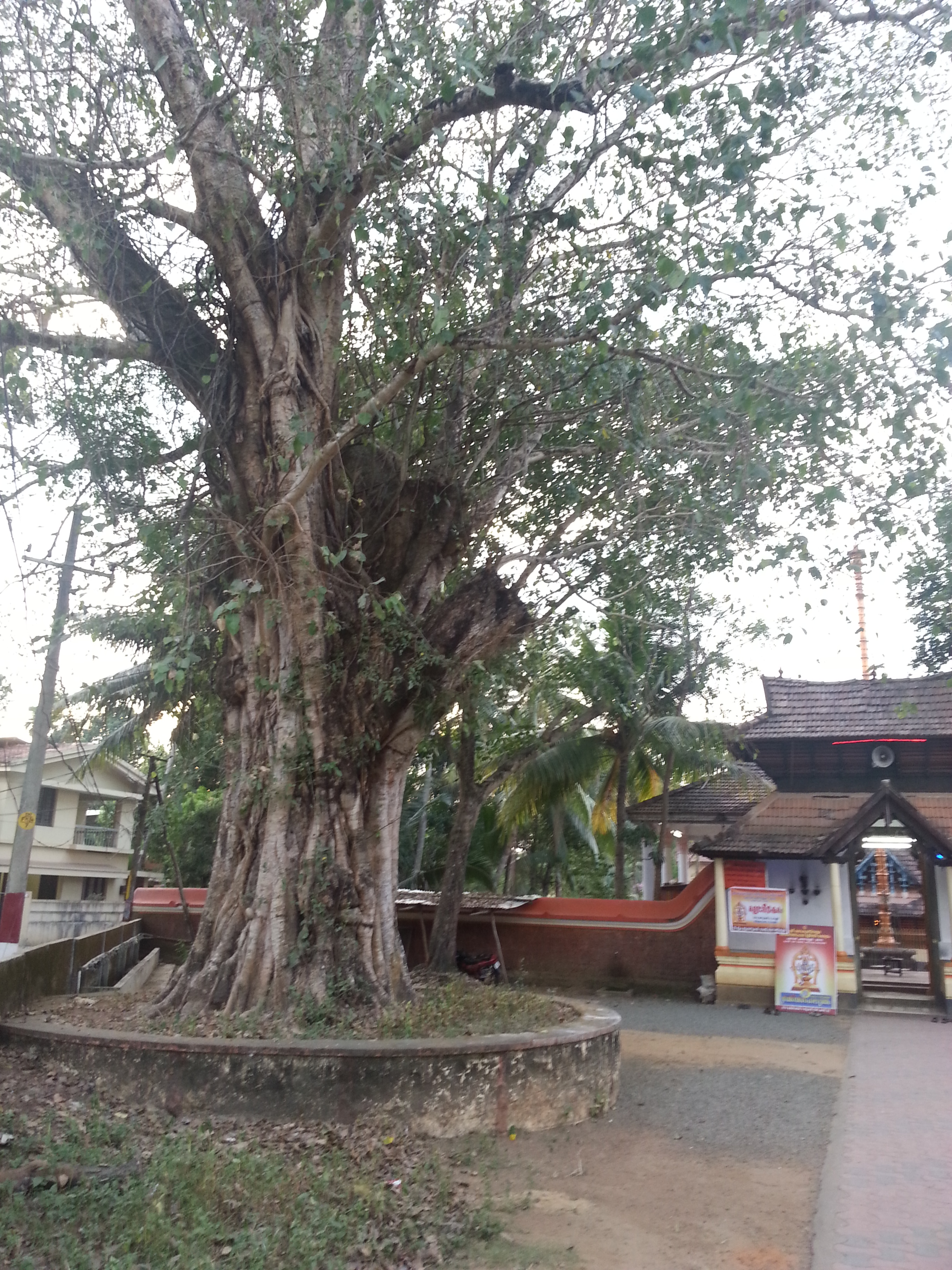
Kottaram temple

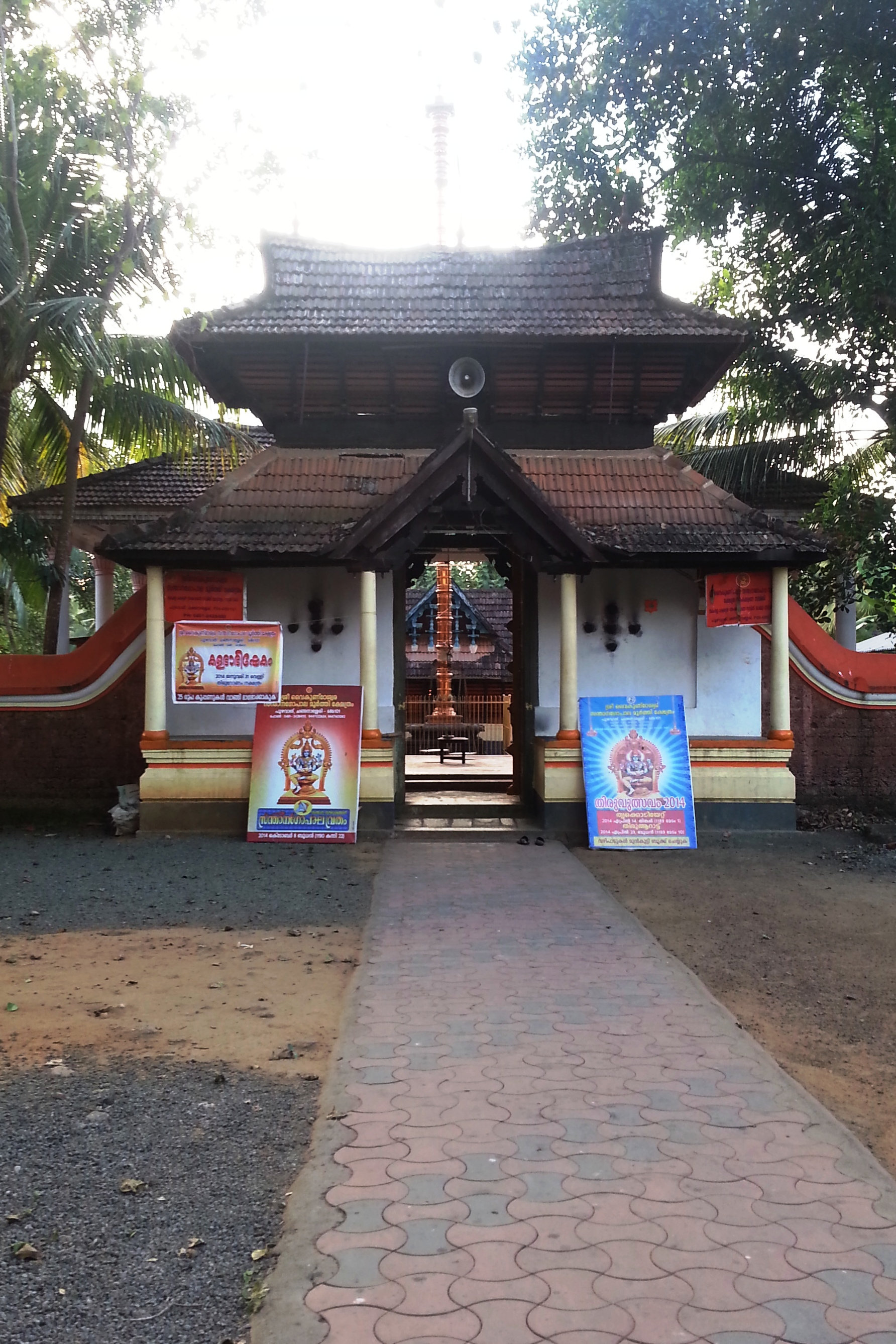
Santhana Gopala Temple

== Religion ==
The place is known for the number of places of worship: Kavil Bhagavathi Temple, The Changanacherry Metropolitan Church and the Pazhayapally Muslim jama ath (Juma masjid) are situated less than 100m apart. Other temples include The Ananthapuram Sree Krishna Temple, The Vettadi Temple, The Mutharamma Temple, and The Vaikunteswara Santhanagopala Murthi Temple.

== Notable people ==
Puzhavathu is the birthplace of the music director / playback singer Sree L.P.R. Varma.

Ex-Finance minister of Kerala, Shri. N Bhaskaran Nair also hails from Puzhavathu. He was the Minister for Finance and Health from 12-10-1979 to 01–12–1979. He was also the President of Nair Service Society and the Travancore Devaswom Board. Under his helm as the President of Travancore Devaswom Board, many facilities were set up in Sabarimala and various temples. He had also authored various books. He died on 30 August 1998 at his residence in Puzhavathu.

Rtd. Music College Professor K. Janardanan, an acclaimed Carnatic Music Vocalist. His formal music studies originated from the Swati Thirunal Music College, Thiruvananthapuram, chiefly under the tutelage of the late Semmangudi Srinivasa Iyer. He had served as Senior Professor in RLV Music College, Tripunithura and Swati Thirunal Music College. He was A Grade Vocal Artist of All India Radio. He died on 2 July 2013 at his residence in Puzhavathu. The village also produced an international cricket umpire.

== Landmarks ==
- The newly constructed Revenue Tower
- The Changanasserry Govt. High School,
- Alummoodu School
- Nair School
- Changanasserry courts
- Lakshmipuram Palace
