= Swathi Thirunal Rama Varma =

Maharaja of Travancore from 1829 to 1846

Swathi Thirunal Rama Varma of Travancore
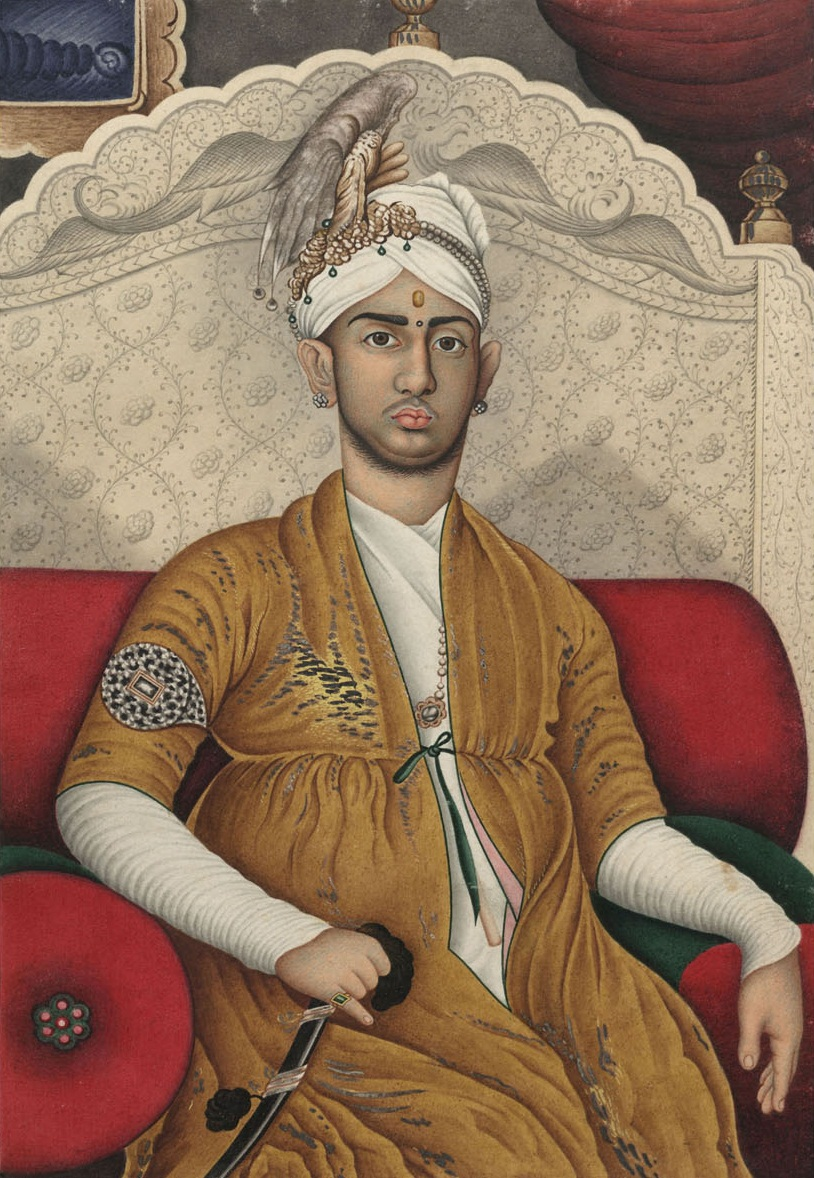
- Painting of Swathi Thirunal Rama Varma c.1842

Maharajah of Travancore
- Reign: 29 July 1813 – 26 December 1846
- Predecessor: Gowri Lakshmi Bayi
- Successor: Uthram Thirunal
- Regent: Gowri Lakshmi Bayi (1813–1815); Gowri Parvati Bayi (1815–1829)
- Born: 16 April 1813; Travancore
- Died: 27 December 1846 (aged 33); Thiruvananthapuram (Travancore)
- Spouse: Thiruvattar Ammachi Panapillai Amma Narayani Pillai, Vadasseri Ammachi Panapillai Amma Neelamma Pillai, Thanjavur Ammachi Panapillai Amma Sundara Lakshmi Pillai
- Issue: Thiruvattar Chithira Nal Ananthapadmanabhan Chempakaraman Thampi
Names
- Sree Padmanabhadasa Sree Swathi Tirunāḷ‍ Rāma Varma Kulashekhara Perumal
Regnal name
- H. H. Sree Padmanabhadasa Vanchipala Sree Ramavarma Kulasekhara Kiritapati Manney Sultan Maharajah Raja Ramaraja Bahadur, Shamsher Jang, Maharajah of Travancore
- House: Venad Swaroopam
- Father: Changanassery Lakshmipuram Palace's Raja Raja Varma Valiya Koyi Thampuran
- Mother: Gowri Lakshmi Bayi
- Religion: Hinduism
- Occupation: Maharajah of Travancore, Hereditary Head of Padmanabhaswamy Temple

Sri Swathi Thirunal Rama Varma III (16 April 1813 – 26 December 1846) was the Maharaja of the Kingdom of Travancore. He was a musician and composer who wrote over 400 classical compositions in both Carnatic and Hindustani style.

A code of laws, courts of justice, introduction of English education, construction of an observatory, installation of the first Government printing press, establishment of the first manuscripts library were amongst the many initiatives taken by Swathi Thirunal, as a King, to modernize Travancore.

== Early life ==
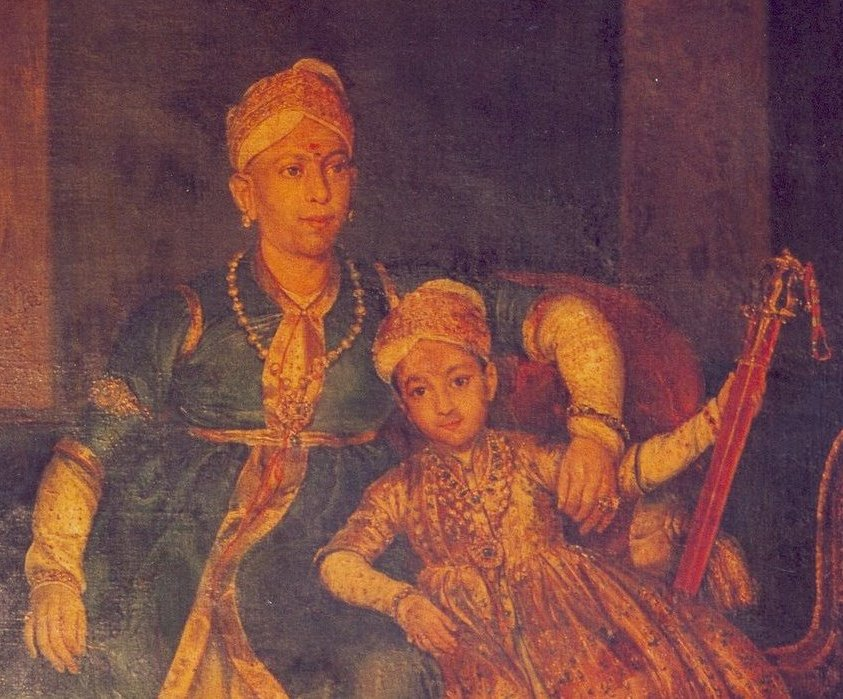
Swathi Thirunal Rama Varma with his father Raja Raja Varma Koil Thampuran by Raja Ravi Varma

Swathi Thirunal was born into the Venad dynasty of the Matrilineal royal family of Travancore, which is now a part of Kerala, on 16 April 1813. He was the second child of Queen Gowri Lakshmi Bayi who ruled Travancore from 1810 to 1815, and Raja Raja Varma Koil Thampuran of Changanasseri Palace, and the elder son. While in the womb itself, he was proclaimed King and thus was referred to as Garbha Sreemaan. He was born in Svati star, and this is the reason why he was named Swathi Thirunal. He reigned under the regency of his mother from 1813 to 1815 and then under the regency of his maternal aunt Gowri Parvati Bayi until 1829. When he was just four months old, his mother invited Colonel John Munro, representative of the East India Company, and his officials and declared in the Durbar that she was entrusting the East India Company with the care of her child and expected the company to co-operate with him in future.He is known as Kalineesam(The demon of Kali Yuga) by Ayyavazhi.

In 1829 Swathi Thirunal reached maturity at 16 and assumed full powers of ruler and reigned as the Maharajah of Travancore until his death in 1846. He had an elder sister, Gowri Rukmini Bayi, whose children ascended the Travancore musnud consecutively. Her only daughter was the mother of Moolam Thirunal. He had a younger brother, Uthram Thirunal Marthanda Varma, who succeeded him in 1846 and ruled Travancore until his demise in 1860.

Irayimman Thampi, the famous poet-composer wrote perhaps the most famous Malayalam lullaby Omanathinkal Kidavo (ഓമനത്തിങ്കള്‍ക്കിടാവോ), about Swathi Thirunal when he was born.

== Education ==
Both his aunt/foster mother, who was well-versed in music, and his father, a Sanskrit scholar, took special care about his education. Col. Munro also is said to have taken a keen interest in his education. He started learning Malayalam and Sanskrit at the age of six and English at the age of seven. The young Prince studied several languages, including Malayalam, Kannada, Tamil, Hindustani, Telugu, Marathi, Sanskrit, English and Persian. He impressed all his teachers, and even guests from abroad, with his keen understanding of not only languages but also other subjects like geometry. P. Sankunni Menon (A History of Travancore from the Earliest Times, 1878) records an incident between young Swathi Thirunal and Col. Welsh, a visiting British officer, that the word geometry and words like hexagon, heptagon and so on were derived from Sanskrit. Colonel Welsh summed up the boy King's genius as follows:

Swati Tirunal, now thirteen... took up a book of mathematics and selecting the forty-seventh proposition of Euclid sketched the figure on a country slate but what astonished me most was his telling us in English that Geometry was derived from the Sanskrit, which as Jaw metor (Jyamiti) to measure the earth and that many of our mathematical terms were also derived from the same source such as hexagon, heptagon, octagon... This promising boy is now, I conclude, sovereign of the finest country in India for he was to succeed to the Musnud (throne) the moment he had attained his 16th year.

== Family ==
In 1829, at the age of sixteen, Maharajah Swathi Thirunal married Thiruvattar Ammachi Panapillai Amma Srimathi Ayikutty Narayani Pillai Thankachi, a famed beauty of the Thiruvattar Ammaveedu family, was an expert Carnatic singer and Veena player.

Once, a minor quarrel arose between Narayani Pillai Ammachi and her husband, the King. The quarrel continued for some days; the Ammachi approached Irayimman Thampi for a solution. According to researchers, he then created the famous Malayalam Padam (song) Prananaathan Enikku Nalkiya and told the Ammachi to sing it loudly in the King's presence; after hearing it the King was pleased and they reconciled immediately. This particular work of Thampi is considered by experts as one of the most beautiful Shringara (erotic) Padams available in Malayalam.

Together, they had three children, but in 1839, Narayani Pillai Ammachi died, leaving behind a son, Thiruvattar Chithira Nal Ananthapadmanabhan Chempakaraman Thampi. A few months later, for the care of the baby, the Maharajah married another lady called Neelamma Pillai Ammachi by adopting her into the Thiruvattar Ammaveedu. He later married Sundara Lakshmi in 1843, a Saiva Mudaliar dancer, after adopting her into Vadasseri Ammaveedu.

The story of the dancer Sugandhavalli who didn't get along with the King's first wife, Narayani Pillai Thankachi, has been disproved by R.P. Raja as nothing but fiction in his research treatise 'New Light on Swathi Thirunal'. In 1845, the King constructed the Thanjavur Ammaveedu for his third consort. Sundara Lakshmi Pillai Ammachi, a great devotee of Lord Ganapati and Kanjirottu Yakshi Amma, resided there until her death in 1846.

== As Reigning Maharajah of Travancore ==
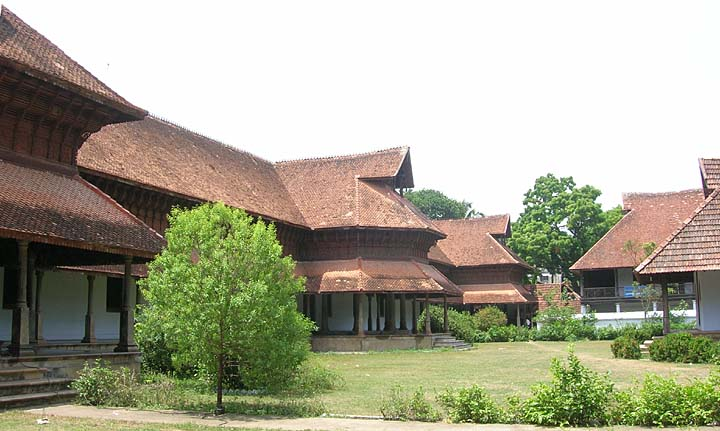
Kuthira Malika, Thiruvananthapuram, constructed by Maharajah Swathi Thirunal

Swathi Thirunal took over the reins of Travancore from his aunt, Gowri Parvati Bayi (she was the Regent for Swathi Thirunal in his boyhood) at the age of sixteen. He appointed his tutor, Sri Subba Rao, as the Prime Minister (Diwan). One of his first moves was to shift the government secretariat from Kollam (about seventy-five kilometers away) to Thiruvananthapuram. This enabled him to give personal attention to government affairs. He took steps to curb corruption in the government and told even the Diwan to resign when he heard that the Diwan had acted to favour a particular party in a land dispute. He started an English school in Thiruvananthapuram in 1834, which came to be called the Maharajah's Government Free School and later became Maharajah's High School and then Maharajah's College. It is now the University College. Later, similar schools were started at many other places. He also implemented reforms in the legal sector, starting Munsif, District and Appellate Courts and modernizing laws. He identified one Kandan Menon from Malabar and appointed him as Huzoor Diwan Peshkar to bring about legal reforms. Another of his achievements was to settle many land disputes by carrying out a resurvey of the land, in which also Menon helped him. He also conducted the first census of the state in 1836. As per the census, the population of Travancore was 128,068.

Swathi Thirunal was also instrumental in bringing modern medicine to the state. He appointed a European as the palace physician. He was also given the responsibility of providing medical assistance to local people, for which hospitals were started. It is this post that was known as Surgeon General till the formation of Kerala State. He also started an engineering department, which was placed under the command of one Lieutenant Horsley. The Karamana bridge was built at that time.

=== Criticism ===
Despite the progress achieved in varied fields under Swathi Thirunal's reign, the Kingdom of Travancore, like the rest of British India, was in the grip of extreme caste discrimination against Hindu lower classes (dalits). According to the followers of the movement called Ayya Vazhi (the path of Ayya Vaikundar) and historians, a social reformer and iconoclast Ayya Vaikundar severely criticized Swathi Thirunal for the then prevalent caste discrimination against the members of the lower classes in Travancore. He is known as Kalineesan (The demon of Kali Yuga) by Ayyavazhi.

== Astronomy and Trivandrum Observatory ==
Another area where Swathi Thirunal took interest was in astronomy. He wished to compare Western findings with Indian knowledge. He had knowledge of observatories in Madras and others. Finding that there was so much in common between western astronomy and Indian (eastern) astrological understanding of planets, stars and the known universe; Swathi Thirunal set the initiative to start an Astronomical Observatory. One of its directors would be his cousin, Raja Rama Varma Rohani Thirunal, who was the contemporary Raja of Mavelikara Palace, an important branch of the ruling Travancore Royal family related to Raja Swathi Thirunal Raja Rohani Thirunal (Rohini) was already an established astronomer from India and a member of the British and Canadian Astronomical Societies. The observatory benefited from the expertise of local English men, Colonel Fraser and Mr. Caldecott. A cotton mill expert John Caldecott, FRS was interested in astronomy but was self-taught, and later became one of its directors. As an industrial representative in Alapuzha, he used to make instruments for astronomical observations and initially mounted viewing instruments on top of mango tree in Residency of Kollam, Kochi and his Alappuzha homes. Raja Swathi Tirunal saw his collection and asked him to come to Thiruvananthapuram to start a similar set-up.

The current observatory site was chosen on top of a laterite mount near the Kanakakunnu hill, which was observed as having the best western sky views in Eastern hemisphere, being near the equator and the Arabian sea. He was instrumental in buying telescopes and tools to Thiruvananthapuram (via ship route through the Middle east) from England. It became a part of the erstwhile Travancore University, but for some time was administered as an independent government institution. It is now the oldest institution under the Kerala University. Started in 1837, some of the equipment is still to be seen at the Thiruvananthapuram observatory (now under the Department of Physics, University of Kerala). In the early sixties, in relation to Indian Space Research Organisation, ISRO, the founder Dr. Vikram Sarabhai selected this astronomy observatory to study equatorial night skies. He assigned his doctoral students, notably Dr. A.P.J Kalam and Dr. K. Narayanan Nair, to collect data on cosmic rays and ionosphere.

Trivandrum Public Library (now State Central Library) and the Oriental Manuscript Library were started by Swathi Thirunal, the Museum and Zoo in Thiruvananthapuram as well. The Maharajah was also an honorary member of the Royal Asiatic Society from 1843. Maharajah Swathi Thirunal also put an end to the barbaric punishment called the 'SUCHINDRAM KAIMUKKU' According to which the accused was forced to prove his innocence by dipping his hand in boiled ghee at Suchindram temple, and he was punished if the hand gets burnt. He is also credited with starting the first government press (the only press at that time was CMS Press in Kottayam).

A report on the English schools in Travancore appeared in The Gardner's Magazine of 1841, wrote about the administrative reforms brought in by Maharajah Swathi Thirunal:

Rajah of Travancore, the great promoter of science in the East, was only twenty-eight years of age, and had not reigned more than ten years, yet, during that short period, he had caused himself to be distinguished by his accomplishments as well as by his' liberality. They would, no doubt, be interested in learning that this prince was educated by his prime minister— a rare tutor for a sovereign. The Rajah had established schools within his dominions—he had established a mathematical school under English superintendence; but he had done more—he had done what, he was sorry to say, had neither been done in England, Scotland, nor Ireland—be had established a school in every village of his dominions— and be gave education to every child, male and female – a change in Indian customs that might lead to the happiest results. He was informed, on good authority, that there was not a child who had reached eight years of age not capable of reading and writing; but this distinguished prince, not satisfied with advancing the interests of elementary education, had established an observatory, and placed in it an English gentleman, a member of the Royal Society of London, and who was in that room – he meant Mr. Caldecott. In this observatory, observations were carried on with the same success as under British interests. The Rajah had also established a magnetical and meteorological observatory, having been led to do so by becoming acquainted with a report on Meteorology, published by the British Association. And the observations taken there were found to be as accurate as those taken in Edinburgh, Philadelphia, and other places.

== Contributions to music and literature ==
Swathi Thirunal was deeply interested in music right from childhood. Besides being an able ruler, he was a patron of music and was a musician himself. Researchers say that Swathi Thirunal affixed his compositions with the mudra Padmanabha, sarasijanaabha, etc. and its synonyms. His education in music started with the first lessons from Karamana Subrahmania Bhagavathar and Karamana Padmanabha Bhagavathar. Later, he studied music from the then English scholar, Thanjavur Subba Rao as well. He continued to learn music by listening to accomplished musicians and practising himself. He encouraged both broad systems of Indian music, Hindustani and Carnatic music, though he was essentially a connoisseur of the Carnatic music tradition. He is credited with composing over 400 compositions in Carnatic and Hindustani music. Some of his favourite compositions were Padmanabha Pahi, Deva Deva, Devanke, Sarasijanabha and Sree Ramana Vibho. Swathi Thirunal was fluent in a number of languages including Malayalam, Sanskrit, Marathi, Telugu, Kannada, Hindustani, Bengali, Tamil, Oriya and English. This was a period when music and art were thriving in many parts of south India. The triumvirate of Carnatic music, Tyagaraja (1767–1847), Syama Sastri (1762–1827) and Muthuswami Dikshitar (1775–1835), lived and enriched music during this period. Swathi Thirunal's palace also was home to many musicians and artistes of the period, including the famous Thanjavur Quartet brothers, Tyagaraja's disciple Kannayya Bhagavathar, Ananthapadmanabha Goswami (a Maharashtrian singer known as Kokilakanthameru swami), Shadkala Govinda Marar, and many others.

The literary works of Maharajah Swathi Thirunal include Bhakti Manjari', Syanandurapuravarnana Prabandham, Padmanabhasatakam, Muhanaprasa Antyaprasa Vyavastha, Ajamila, Kuchela Upakhyanas and Utsava Varnana Prabandha.

== Death ==
As a monarch, Swathi Thirunal was incredibly hardworking and supremely committed to his kingdom and people. The appointment of General Cullen as the Resident of Travancore, was the beginning of the end for the Maharajah. Historian P. Shungunny Menon wrote: Resident Jerond Cullen assumed almost sovereign authority. Such was his oppressive intrusion in the administration. The king was made totally powerless. Compounding this atrocity was the machinations of his aide Krishna Rao, who schemed with Cullen for his own personal gain. What ever the reason, the Resident's intrusion in the administration was unbearable for the young King. To compound his problems, the deaths of his elder sister, father, wife Narayani and all three children (Narayani's) made the Maharajah distraught. He increasingly sought silence and solitude, weakening his mind and body. Thus, at the age of 33, Maharajah Swathi Thirunal died on 26 December 1846. The demise of Maharajah Swathi Thirunal attracted the attention of even the foreign press. Allen's Indian Mail and Register of Intelligence of British &Foreign India, China, & All Parts of the East wrote:

Both intellectually and morally, he was indeed far beyond his country and equals in rank; in both respects he might have taken a high place among the most enlightened of European Sovereigns had his destiny been so cast. You will be grieved to learn about the demise of His Highness the Rajah of Travancore. Among the native princes of India, he was distinguished for his superior intelligence and extensive acquirements in oriental literature. He is not unknown to fame in the European world, for most of you must be aware that the deceased Rajah maintained an observatory at considerable expense, and that MR Caldecott was for a length of time, his highness's astronomer. The ephemeris emanating from the Travancore observatory was a valuable contribution to astronomical science ... The Rajah also supported an English school on a scale of liberality that perhaps has few precedents in other native states. He was a steady and staunch advocate of education, friend and patron of men of letters ... his loss will doubtless be greatly deplored by Travancoreans as a national calamity.

— quote

The Journal the Royal Asiatic Society of Great Britain and Ireland ran an obituary in 1847 which mourned that,

The early death of this enlightened and princely patron of true science, is a subject of just regret.

— quote

== Legacy ==
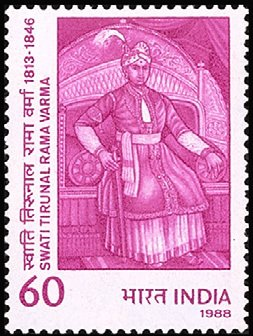
1988 Indian Postage stamp depicting Swathi Thirunal Rama Varma

=== Swathi Sangeethotsavam ===
Prince Rama Varma, renowned South Indian Classical musician and descendant of Swathi Thirunal, organizes the Swathi Sangeethotsavam, a 10-day music festival featuring exclusively the compositions of Maharaja Swathi Thirunal. Eminent Carnatic and Hindustani musicians participate in this unique musical event, which is conducted every year from 4 to 13 January at Kuthira Malika, Thiruvananthapuram and attracts music aficionados from across the globe.

=== Swathi Sangeetha Puraskaram ===
The award Swathi Sangeetha Puraskaram is instituted in the name of Maharajah Swathi Thirunal of Travancore to honour those musicians who have made valuable contributions to the field of music. It is also the highest honour for musicians by the Government of Kerala, India.

=== In popular culture ===
In 1987, a Malayalam film titled Swathi Thirunal based on his life was released. It was directed by Lenin Rajendran. It stars Anant Nag in the title role, and Srividya, Ambika, Nedumudi Venu and Murali in other important roles.

Sree Swathi Thirunal Maharaja, a 1967 documentary film about the king, directed by K. T. John, was produced by the Government of India's Films Division.

== Compositions ==
Composition	Raga	Tala	Type	Language
BhAvayAmi RaghurAmam	Saveri (today, sung in rAgamalikA tuned by Semmangudi Srinivasa Iyer)	Rupakam		Sanskrit
Deva deva kalayami te	maya malava gowla (tuned by Semmangudi Srinivasa Iyer)	Rupaka		Sanskrit
dEvanke	Darbari	Adi		Sanskrit
Deva mamayi pahi shadanana	Kedaragaula	Misra Chapu		Sanskrit
kamalajaasya	Ragamalika	Adi		Sanskrit
Dheem Ta dhuniku taka dhIm	dhana shRI (tuned by Lalgudi Jayaraman)	Adi	tillAna	Hindustani
jaya jaya padmanAbha murArE	Sarasangi	Adi		Sanskrit
kamala nayana jagadIswara	Vagadheeswari (tuned by M. Balamuralikrishna)	Adi		Sanskrit
kripaya paalaya shaure	Charukesi	Adi		Sanskrit
pAhi shrIpatE	hamsadhwani	Adi		Sanskrit
sArasAksha paripAlaya mAmayi	Pantuvarali	Adi		Sanskrit
satatam tAvaka kara sEvitam	Kharaharapriya	Adi		Sanskrit
sarasIjanAbha	Kambhoji	Khanda Jaathi Ata	Varnam	Telugu
sarasIjanAbha	Mayamalavagowla	Adi	Varnam	Sanskrit
smara janaka shubha charithA	Behag	Misra Chapu		Sanskrit
pAhi parvata nandini	Arabhi	Adi		Sanskrit

== See also ==
- List of Carnatic composers
- Thunchath Ezhuthachan Malayalam University
- Prince Aswathi Thirunal Rama Varma, a descendant

Swathi Thirunal Rama Varma Kulasekhara Dynasty Born: 16 April 1813 Died: 25 December 1846
Regnal titles
Preceded by Gowri Lakshmi Bayi (as Maharani of Travancore)	Maharaja of Travancore; 1813–1846	Succeeded by Uthram Thirunal
