= Gowri Lakshmi Bayi =

Maharani of Travancore from 1810 to 1813

Ayilyom Thirunal Gowri Lakshmi Bayi
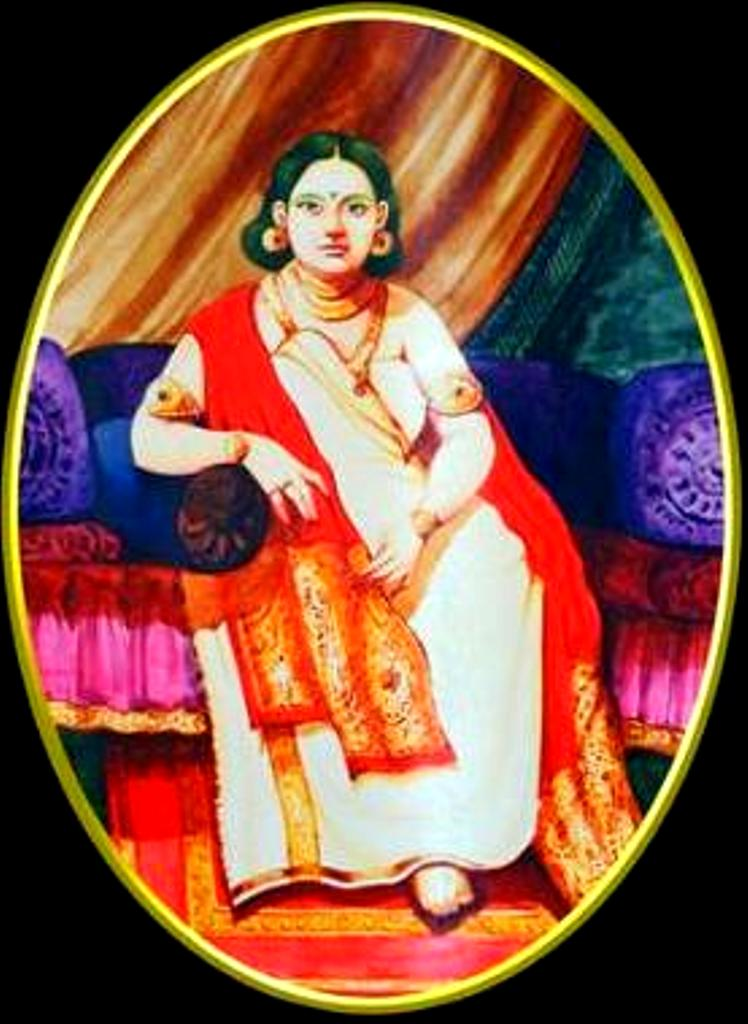

Maharani of Travancore
- Reign: 7 November 1810 – 29 July 1813
- Predecessor: Balarama Varma
- Successor: Swathi Thirunal

Maharani Regent of Travancore
- Regency: 1813–1815
- Successor: Gowri Parvati Bayi
- Monarch: Swathi Thirunal
- Born: 1791; Travancore
- Died: 1815 (aged 24); Travancore
- Consort: Raja Raja Varma Koil Thampuran of Changanassery
- Issue: Maharani Gowri Rukmini Bayi, Maharajah Swathi Thirunal, Maharajah Uthram Thirunal
Names
- Her Highness Sree Padmanabhasevini Vanchidharma Vardhini Raja Rajeshwari Maharani Ayilyom Thirunal Gowri Lakshmi Bayi Maharani of Travancore
- House: Venad Swaroopam
- Dynasty: Kulasekhara
- Father: Kilimanoor Koyi Thampuran
- Mother: Bharani Thirunal Parvathy Bayi
- Religion: Hinduism

Maharani Ayilyom Thirunal Gowri Lakshmi Bayi (1791–1815), also spelled Gauri Lakshmi Bayi, was the Maharani of the Indian state of Travancore from 1810 till 1813 and Regent from 1813 till her death in 1815 for her son Swathi Thirunal Rama Varma. She was the only Queen of Travancore to have reigned in her own right which she did for three years before becoming the regent for her son.

== Background ==
Gowri Lakshmi Bayi was born in the year 1791 to Princess Bharani Thirunal Parvathy Bayi, Senior Rani of Attingal of the Travancore Royal Family, adopted sister of Maharajah Balarama Varma. Bharani Thirunal was adopted into the Travancore family from Kolathunad in 1788. The Maharanis of Travancore were styled as the "Ranis of Attingal". Gowri Lakshmi Bayi was one of Travancore's most popular Queens and introduced several reforms in the state. She also had a sister Uthrattathi Thirunal Gowri Parvati Bayi.

== Accession to the throne and rule ==
The unpopular Maharajah Bala Rama Varma, during whose reign Travancore faced a number of internal and external problems, revolts and unnecessary battles and conspiracies, including the most important revolt of Velu Thampi Dalawa, died in 1809. At the death of the Maharajah, Gowri Lakshmi Bayi, the senior Rani of Attingal, was barely twenty years of age. There were no eligible male members in the family which meant she would have to take over Travancore and rule it as queen till such an heir would be born to her. However her accession was not easy because a member from the Mavelikara branch of the royal family, a distant cousin, Prince Kerala Varma, who was the pet of the previous ruler, staked a claim on the throne which was anything but substantiated. The Queen placed in the hands of the British Resident Col. John Munro, one of Travancore's most loved British Residents, a document asserting her claim and proving the claim of Kerala Varma untenable. This irked Kerala Varma who resorted to tact and tried to convince the Princess to give up her claim. However the Resident sided with Gowri Lakshmi Bayi and she was made the official Maharani of Travancore in 1811. Kerala Varma was permitted to reside at Thiruvananthapuram, the capital. But when he tried to create further troubles, he was imprisoned and banished from Travancore.

=== Selection of the Dewan ===
One of the earliest acts of Queen Gowri Lakshmi Bayi was to dismiss the existing Dewan or Prime Minister, Ummini Thampi. Ummini Thampi was accused of squandering money and acquiring all the property of the vanquished rebel freedom fighter Velu Thampi Dalawa and others. He was dismissed and when he tried to cause further trouble, he was imprisoned and punished after being found guilty of conspiracy against the queen. The queen was now asked to nominate some individual for the post of Dewan, to which she stated that she found no eligible individual and would like to appoint the Resident Colonel John Munro as her Dewan. Accordingly, Munro became Dewan of Travancore in 1811.

=== Government reforms ===
- The Dewan Col. Munro informed the Maharani of the widespread corruption in her Government owing to the practice of giving all power, administrative and judicial, to a single officer right from village level to district level. To end this the Proverticars (village officers), Kariakkars (Taluka officers) and the district officials were all deprived of their judicial powers and instead a Court of Appeal and five District Courts at Padmanabhapuram, Mavelikara, Thiruvananthapuram, Vaikam and Alwaye were established and modern judicial system was introduced in Travancore. The Courts had each two judges and a Brahmin Sastri. For the trial of Government servants another court known as the Huzhur court was also established.
- The Police was reorganised in Travancore during the reign of Maharani Gowri Lakshmi Bayi at the suggestion of Col. John Munro Dewan.
- Deprived of magisterial and judicial power, the district and village officials now could concentrate their attention on the collection of revenue alone, curtailing their power greatly and making them subject to judicial trial in case of misconduct. The revenue department was cleaned of corruption and revenue collection became smoother and organised.

=== Social reforms ===
- Taxes on festivals, taxes on inheritance of property were abolished.
- Travancore contained a large number of Devaswoms or Temple Corporations that held vast areas of land and controlled most of the important and wealthy temples in the country. These corporations had fallen prey to corruption and mismanagement and they next engaged the Dewan's attention. More than three hundred of the biggest temples of Travancore were appropriated by the Government under a Devaswom Board and cleared of corruption and mismanagement.
- By a Royal Proclamation in 1812 5 December, Her Highness Maharani Gowri Lakshmi Bayi abolished the purchase and sale of all slaves and granted them independence excepting those attached to the soil for agricultural purposes.
- Castes like the Ezhavas, Kaniyans etc. were given independence from their Lords. A restriction put on the Shudras and others regarding the wearing of gold and silver ornaments was removed.
- A vaccination department was started in Travancore in 1813 under her rule. Finding orthodox reservations amongst her subjects with regard to vaccination, the Queen first vaccinated herself and other members of the Royal family to reassure her people.
- Secretariat system was introduced under the guidelines of Col. Munro.

=== Change in Dewanship ===
In 1814, Colonel John Munro resigned his Dewanship as it was not a permanent arrangement for the Resident to take that post. In his stead the Judge of the Appeal Court, Devan Padmanabhan was appointed as Dewan. However he soon after died from smallpox. In his place, one of Col. Munro's assistants, Bappu Rao, was appointed as Dewan of Travancore in that same year.

== Family ==
The Maharani was married to a Koil Thampuran, Prince Rajaraja Varma Avargal of the Changanassery Royal Family. From this marriage Gowri Lakshmi Bayi had issue, two sons and a daughter. Her daughter was Maharani Gowri Rukmini Bayi born in 1809. Her eldest son was born on 16 April 1813, King Swathi Thirunal who was a musician and artist and ruled independently from 1829 to 1846. He married a lady who belonged to the Thiruvattar Ammaveedu family. The Maharani next had a son in 1814, Maharajah Uthram Thirunal who ruled from 1846 to 1860.

== Illness and death ==
The Maharani Gowri Lakshmi Bayi started losing her health after giving birth to her youngest son and died in 1815. She was succeeded by her oldest son, King Swathi Thirunal with her sister Gowri Parvati Bayi as the Regent Maharani.

== Succession ==
Her only daughter, who was now the only female in the matriarchal Travancore Royal Family, Gowri Rukmini Bayi married Rama Varma Koil Thampuran of Thiruvalla Royal Family in 1819 and had seven children, five sons and two daughters. One of these daughters died soon while the other married and had two sons, including Moolam Thirunal Sri Rama Varma. She too died in 1857 after the birth of Moolam Thirunal and so in 1858 two princesses were adopted from the Mavelikara Royal family into Travancore.

== Full Title ==
Her Highness Sri Padmanabha Sevini Vanchi Dharma Vardhini Raja Rajeshwari Maharani Ayilyam Thirunal Gowri Lakshmi Bayi, Attingal Mootha Thampuran, Maharani of Travancore.

== See also ==
- Travancore
- Maharani
- Swathi Thirunal
- Moolam Thirunal
- Nair
- Ammaveedu

== Sources ==
- Aiya, V. Nagam (1906). The Travancore State Manual. Trivandrum, Travancore: Travancore Government Press. OCLC 6164443. (3 volumes)
- Menon, P. Shungoonny (1878). A History of Travancore from the Earliest Times. Madras, India: Higginbotham.

Gowri Lakshmi Bayi Kulasekhara Dynasty Born: 1791 Died: 1815
Regnal titles
| Preceded by Balarama Varma | Maharani of Travancore; 1810–1813 | Succeeded by Swathi Thirunal |
