= Koyi Thampuran =

Prince Consort Ravi Varma Koyi Thampuran, the father of Travancore King, Sree Chithira Thirunal Balarama Varma

Koyi Thampuran was the title of the Prince Consorts of the Queens and Princesses of Travancore. The Koyi Thampurans' gained prominence and prestige in Kingdom of Travancore as they were the fathers of the then reigning Kings. In Travancore, there were ten clans of Koyi Thampurans. The most ancient were the ones settled at Kilimanoor (in Attingal); others were Kirthipuram (in Mavelikkara), Pallam (in Kottayam), Paliyakkara (in Thiruvalla) and Nirazhi (in Changanasseri), Ananthapuram (in Karthikapalli), Chemprol (in Chengannur), Cherukol (in Pathanamthitta), Karazhma (in Mavelikara) and Vatakkemadham.

== History ==
Adoption of Princess from Kolathiri Kingdom

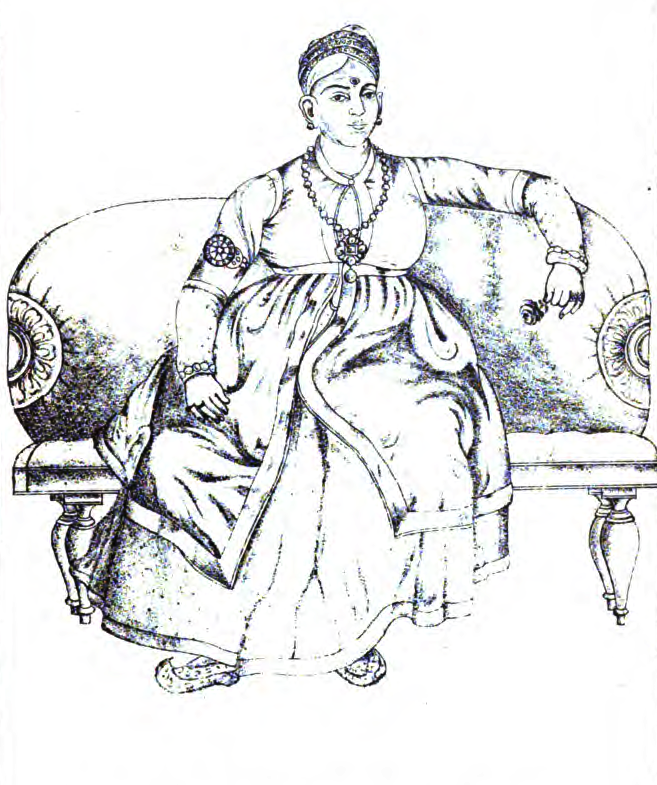
Rajah Rajah Varma Valiya Koyi Thumpuran, father of Maharajah Swathi Thirunal

After the invasion of Malik Kafur in 1310, Veera Udaya Marthandavarma was forced to abdicate in favour of the Princesses sent from the Kolathiri Royal Family (also a family descending Mooshika vamsham. Mooshika kingdom in Kannur and Ay kingdom near Kanyakumari were the erstwhile kingdoms which disintegrated during the initial period of the first Chera dynasty period) called Attingal and Kunnumel Ranis. The line of kings after Ravi Varma continued through the Marumakkathayam law of matrilineal succession of Nairs. Thus, the Southern Chera-Ay dynasty adopted Matriarchy/Marumakkathayam after 1310. With the adoption of Attingal and Kunnumel Ranis to Venad in 1310, only the sons of the Attingal Rani had the right to become the King and the King's sons from non-aristocratic Nair women did not have the right to become the next king. The Attingal Queen started adopting prince and princesses from the other Matriarchal dynasties of Kerala from the Koalthiri dynasty to the Venads Chera-Ay Royal houses. Soon after Ravi Varma's death two princesses were adopted from the Kolathiri Royal family and installed as Ranis or Queens at Attingal. The Venad Royal family continued thus in the female line. Whenever there were no females to take forth the line, princesses were adopted from the Kolathiri family, the latest adoption being in 1994. This tradition was reciprocal with several adoptions from the Venad Family also going into Kolathiri. The Koyi Thampurans were aristocratic men who were chosen to become the Prince Consorts or husbands to these Attingal Ranis.

== Title and Status ==
The females of the royal family are styled as the "Arringal Ranis" (Queens of Attingal) with the titles of Attingal Mootha Thampuran (Senior Queen of Attingal) and "Attingal Elaya Thampuran" (Junior Queen of Attingal) and "Attingal Kochu Thampuran" (First Princess). According to historians, the Koyi Thampuran's or the Prince Consorts were selected from 10 major aristocratic houses or palaces which are closely related to the Travancore Dynasty. The Prince Consorts of the Senior and Junior Maharanis are known as the Valiya Koyi Thampuran and Kochu Koyi Thampuran respectively.

Even though the Koyi Thampurans attained prestige through marriage to the Attingal Ranis, the historians state that they were considered inferior to their spouses and their royal children. They weren't allowed to travel by the same vehicles and were not allowed to be seated next to the Queens and Princesses who were their wives. They were also supposed to provide their royal spouses and children all marks of respect and could only address them with the proper royal titles in public. They had no part in the Kingdom's administration even though couple of them tried to exert their influence illegally on their spouses. Compared to the status of the Travancore King's non aristocratic Nair spouses Ammachi Panapillai Ammas, the Koyi Thampuran's status were much better and had high degree of public respect. By the 20th Century, a lot of changes had taken place in the status of Koyi Thampurans. In 1924, Maharani Regent Sethu Lakshmi Bayi chose to seat her consort next to her in the Court despite some oppositions. And with the wedding of Karthika Thirunal Lakshmi Bayi, the sister of Maharajah Sree Chithira Thirunal, with the then Capt. G. V. Raja almost all of those restrictions were lifted. Even then, the Koyi Thampurans weren't allowed to meddle in the administration. Maharajah Sree Chithira Thirunal eventually did handed his brother-in-law, Capt. G. V. Raja, duties & position in the then royal government.

=== Famous Koyi Thampurans ===
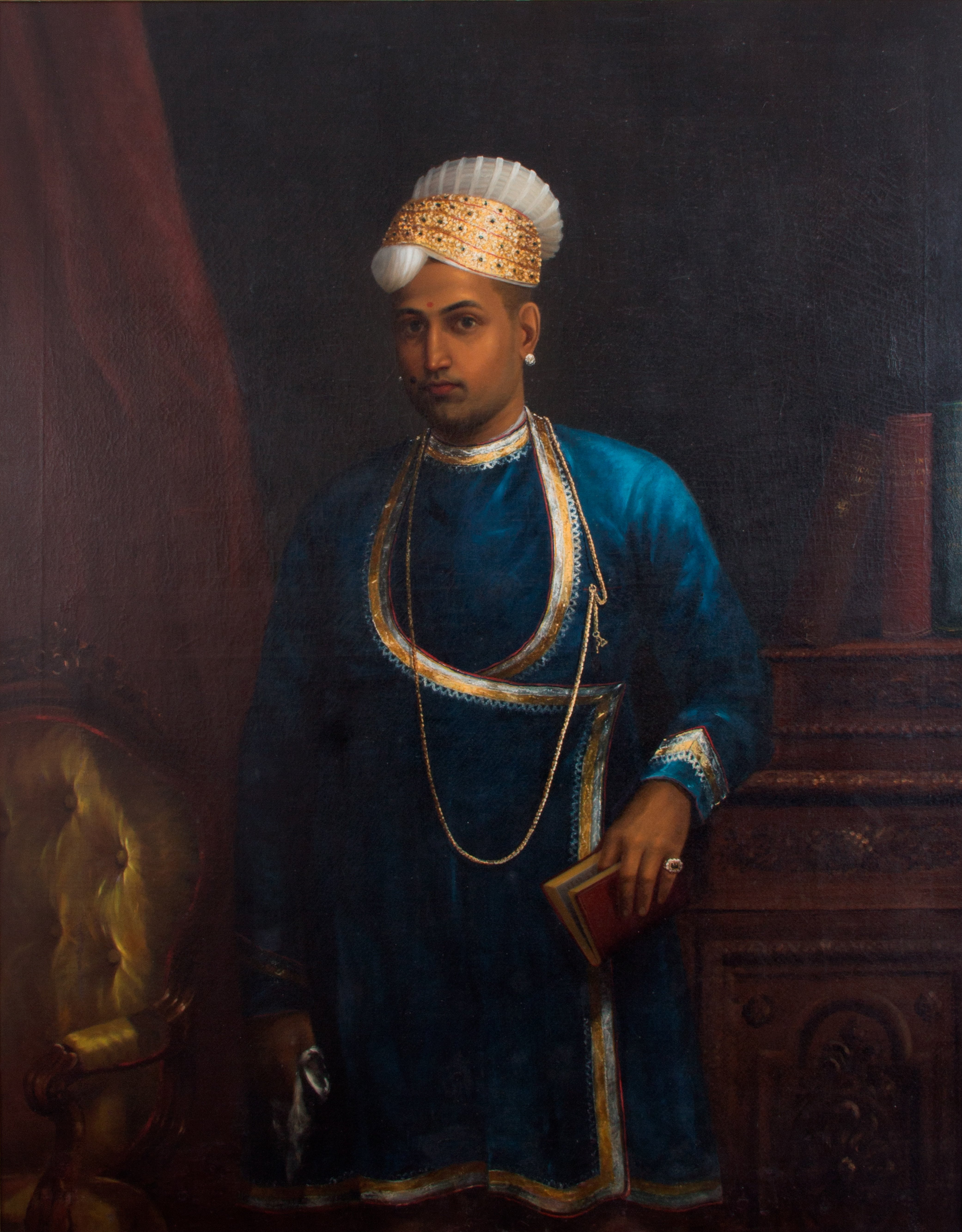
Kerala Varma Valiya Koil Thampuran was married to Her Highness Maharani Bharani Thirunal Lakshmi Bayi

Kerala Varma Valiya Koil Thampuran, Prince Consort of Maharani Bharani Thirunal Lakshmi Bayi, and Col G. V. Raja, consort of Maharani Karthika Thirunal Lakshmi Bayi, went on to become famous in their own terms.

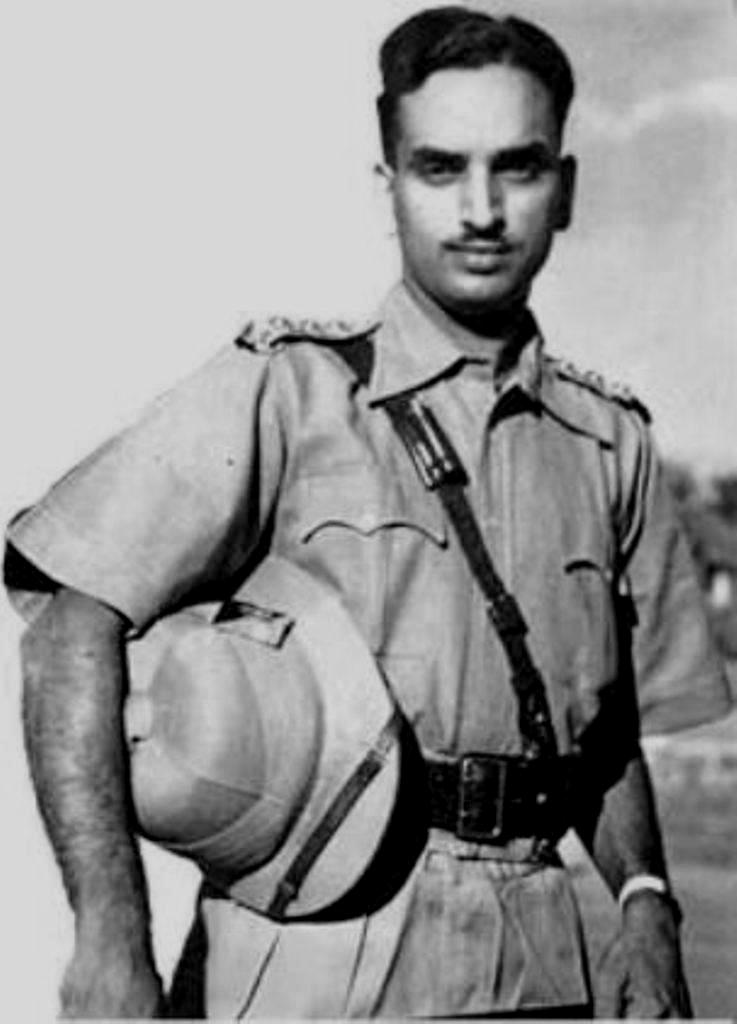
Prince Consort Col. G. V. Raja was married to H.H. Maharani Karthika Thirunal Lakshmi Bayi

Kerala Varma Valiya Koil Thampuran (1845–1914) was renowned as Kalidasa of Kerala. He served as a member of the Assembly for three years. His interest in Kathakali made him write Kathakali songs in Malayalam, Kannada, Telugu and Tamil. His famous works are the translation of Kalidasa's 'Abhijnana Shakunthalam'. This was the first drama in Malayalam literature, which earned the title 'Kerala Kalidasan' to him. He has also written Mayura Sandesam on the line of Kalidasa's Meghadutam, while in house arrest. In the poem, he used the peacocks of Haripad temple to send his messages to his wife, Bharani Thirunal Lakshmi Bayi stationed in Trivandrum. He died of injuries as a result of a car accident that he suffered in 1914.

Another royal consort who attained immortal fame was Karthika Nal Godavarma Raja (1908–1971) of Poonjar dynasty, famously known as Lt. Col. G. V. Raja, the Koyi Thampuran of Maharani Karthika Thirunal Lakshmi Bayi. A major exception to the rule of selection and status of Prince Consort was made when Maharajah Sree Chithira Thirunal chose the then Captain. Godavarma Raja (later Lt. Col.), of the Poonjar Royal House as the Prince Consort for his only sister, Maharani Karthika Thirunal Lakshmi Bayi in 1934. The Maharajah felt that it was fine to make a different choice so as to find a suitable spouse for his sister and for the first time chose a bridegroom from the Poonjar dynasty. Usually, the Koyi Thampurans were chosen from Travancore's aristocratic houses such as Paliyakkara, Kilimanur, Chembrol etc. The Maharajah entrusted Capt. Raja with the responsibility of dealing with foreign dignitaries; he was also appointed as the head of the sports and tourism departments of the then royal government. Capt. Raja then developed Kovalam as a major tourism destination by inviting many foreign dignitaries and by promoting the place by organising parties at the Kovalam Palace, according to Kerala Tourism Development Corporation. Capt. Raja was also appointed as one of the Commanding Officers of Nair Brigade of Travancore Military. He served in it till 1949 and retired as a Lt. Col. Col. Raja established Travancore Sports Council (later renamed Kerala Sports Council), Travancore-Cochin Cricket Association(later renamed Kerala Cricket Association), Travancore Royal Flying Club (later renamed Thiruvananthapuram International Airport), and other twenty or more institutions dedicated to sports and tourism promotion in Kerala and was also the founder President of the aforementioned institutions. The CricInfo website reports that Col. Raja was the first Malayali to become the vice-president of Board of Control for Cricket in India, and had he lived, he would have become President of the Board of Control for Cricket in India. He established the first travel agency of the state named Kerala Travels in 1959. He also took the initiative to develop the Thiruvananthapuram Airport. He was killed in a light air plane crash in 1971.
