= Uthradom Thirunal Marthanda Varma =

Maharaja of Travancore (1922–2013)

- Titular Maharajah of Travancore (monarchy abolished)
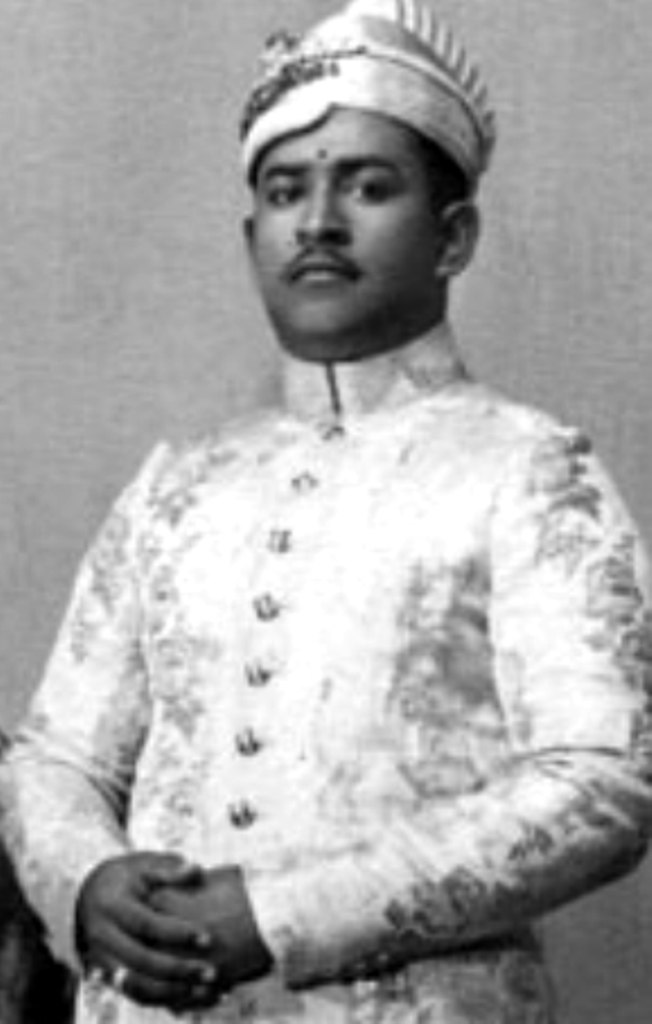
- Uthradom Thirunal Marthanda Varma

Titular Maharajah of Travancore And Head of Travancore royal family
- Reign: 1991–2013
- Coronation: 1991
- Predecessor: Chithira Thirunal Balarama Varma
- Successor: Moolam Thirunal Rama Varma (titular)

Last Crown Prince Of Travancore
- Reign: 1924-1949
- Predecessor: Chithira Thirunal Balarama Varma
- Successor: Position Abolished Moolam Thirunal Rama Varma (titular)
- Born: 22 March 1922; Thiruvananthapuram, Kingdom of Travancore, British Raj (present-day Thiruvananthapuram, Kerala, India)
- Died: 16 December 2013 (aged 91); Thiruvananthapuram, Kerala, India
- Spouse: Ammachi Panapillai Amma Srimathi Radhadevi Pandalai of Kayamkulam
- Issue: Ananthapadmanabhan Thampi and Parvati Devi Thankachi
Names
- Sree Padmanabhadasa Sree Uthradom Thirunal Marthanda Varma Maharajah of Travancore (Titular)
- House: Venad Swaroopam
- Dynasty: Travancore royal family
- Father: Ravi Varma Kochu Koil Thampuran
- Mother: Queen Mother Moolam Thirunal Sethu Parvathi Bayi
- Religion: Hinduism

Sree Padmanabhadasa Sree Uthradom Thirunal Marthanda Varma (22 March 1922 – 16 December 2013) was the titular Maharaja of Travancore. He was the younger brother of the last ruling monarch of the Kingdom of Travancore, Maharajah Chithira Thirunal Balarama Varma.

Named Heir Apparent from birth, as per the Travancore matrilineal law of succession, Sree Uthradom Thirunal joined the firm of Plymouth and Company at Bangalore in 1952, working there as a clerk and truck driver briefly to study the functioning of industries at a basic level. He was the Chief Scout of the regional Boy Scout troop, and is also a patron of local hospitals and charities.

He married Ammachi Panapillai Amma Shrimati Radhadevi Pandalai, the daughter of Lt. Col. Krishnan Gopinathan Pandalai, a medical doctor, military veteran, and superintendent of the Government General Hospital, Madras, from 1921 to 1935. The couple had a son, Ananthapadmanabhan Thampi and a daughter, Parvathidevi Kochamma. Sree Uthradom Thirunal resided at Pattom Palace, Thiruvananthapuram until his death in 2013.

== Early life ==
Sree Uthradom Thirunal was the youngest son of H.H queen mother Sethu Parvathi Bayi of Travancore by her consort, Ravi Varma Kochu Koyi Thampuran of Kilimanoor Royal House, a Sanskrit scholar and the great-nephew of the celebrated painter, Raja Ravi Varma. He was born on 22 March 1922 in Travancore. His siblings were Chithira Thirunal Balarama Varma and Karthika Thirunal Lakshmi Bayi. His mother, Sethu Parvathi Bayi, was distantly related, by birth, to the Travancore Royal Family in the direct female line. In 1900, following the absence of heirs in the Travancore Royal Family, she had been adopted by her maternal great-aunt, Maharani Lakshmi Bayi. According to the matrilineal traditions of the Travancore Royal Family, Sree Uthradom Thirunal, at the time of his birth, was proclaimed the Heir Apparent of Travancore with the title of : Sree Padmanabhadasa Maharajkumar Sree Marthanda Varma, Elaya Rajah (Crown Prince) of Travancore.

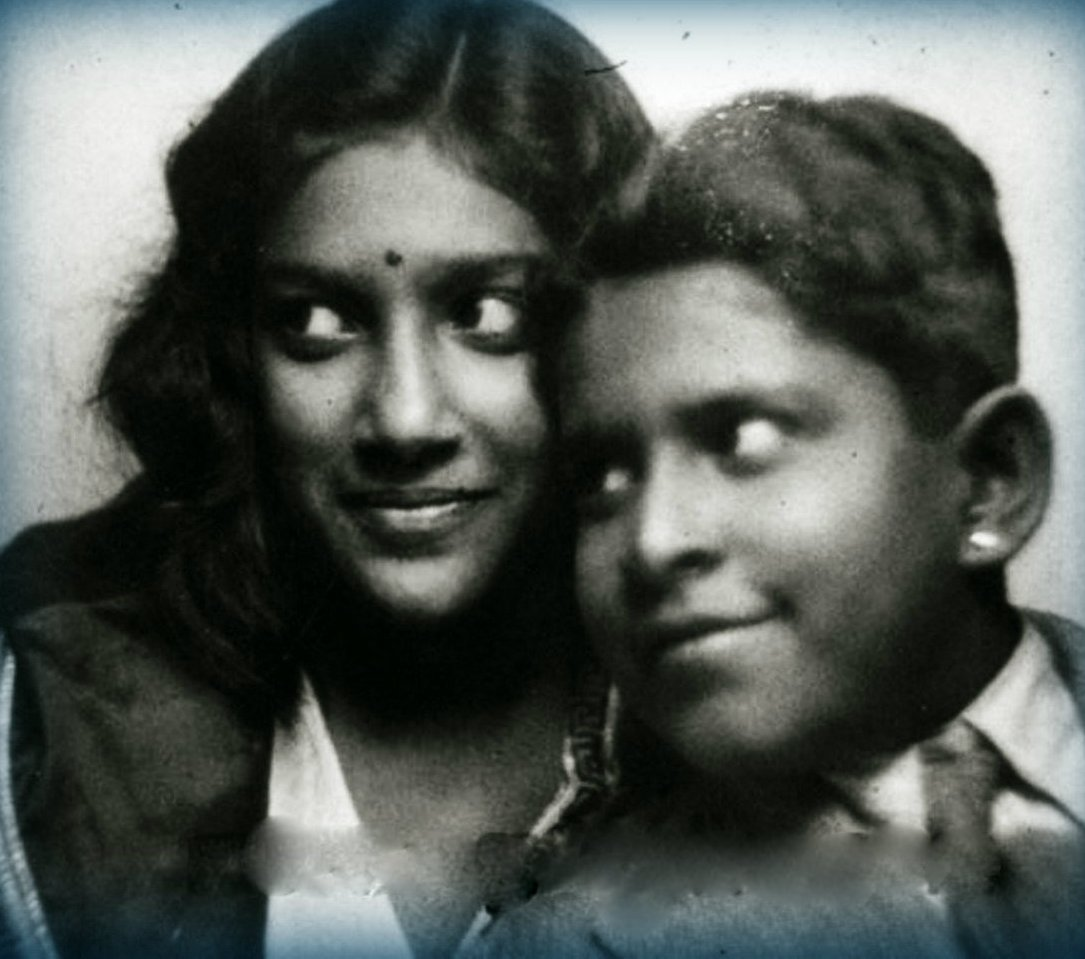
Uthradom Thirunal with his older sister, Karthika Thirunal Lakshmi Bayi

Sree Uthradom Thirunal was educated privately by a group of 14 tutors in various subjects. He later graduated from the then Travancore University with Economics, Politics and History as specialisations in 1943. He was the recipient of the Moncombu Aandi Iyer Gold Medal for the best student in Sanskrit from the varsity. He was respected for his erudition.

== Titular Maharajah of Travancore ==
Sree Uthradom Thirunal became head of the Travancore royal family after his elder brother and the last monarch of Travancore Sree Chithira Thirunal Balarama Varma died in 1991. As a titular Maharaja, Uthradom Thirunal had no real administrative power but was a popular figure in Travancore, and had daily ceremonial engagements. He also maintained his ritual position at the Padmanabhaswamy Temple as the custodian of the temple, and was involved in events relating to this. On the discovery of the immense wealth in the vaults of Sree Padmanabha Swamy Temple in Thiruvananthapuram, the family shrine of Travancore royals, Uthradom Tirunal stated: "It has been in the temple vaults for centuries and the royal family has been well aware of that. It is the wealth of Lord Padmanabha and we have never ever felt any interest in it. It should be preserved as God's wealth in future also." Uthradom Thirunal Marthanda Varma successor is Sree Padmanabhadasa Sree Moolam Thirunal Rama Varma his nephew and second son of Sree Padmanabhasevini Maharani Karthika Thirunal Lakshmi Bayi of Travancore and her husband Lt. Col. G. V. Raja.

== Community involvement ==
- Trustee and "Dasa" of Sree Padmanabhaswamy Temple
- Patron-in-Chief Thiruvananthapuram Kendra Bharatiya Vidya Bhavan
- Chief Scout Travancore Boy Scouts Assoc, Travancore-Cochin Boy Scouts Assoc and Kerala Boy Scouts Assoc.
- Chief Patron Sneham Super Speciality Hospital Project
- Patron Sri Swati Thirunal Sangita Sabha since 1991
- Patron Shree Uthradom Tirunal Hospital (SUT)
- Patron Muthalamada Sneham Charitable Trust
- Patron Trivandrum Tennis Club (TTC) since 1938
- Patron Trivandrum Club
- Patron Trivandrum Friend-in-Need Soc
- Patron Ananthapuram Non-Resident's Association (ANORA)

== Personal life ==
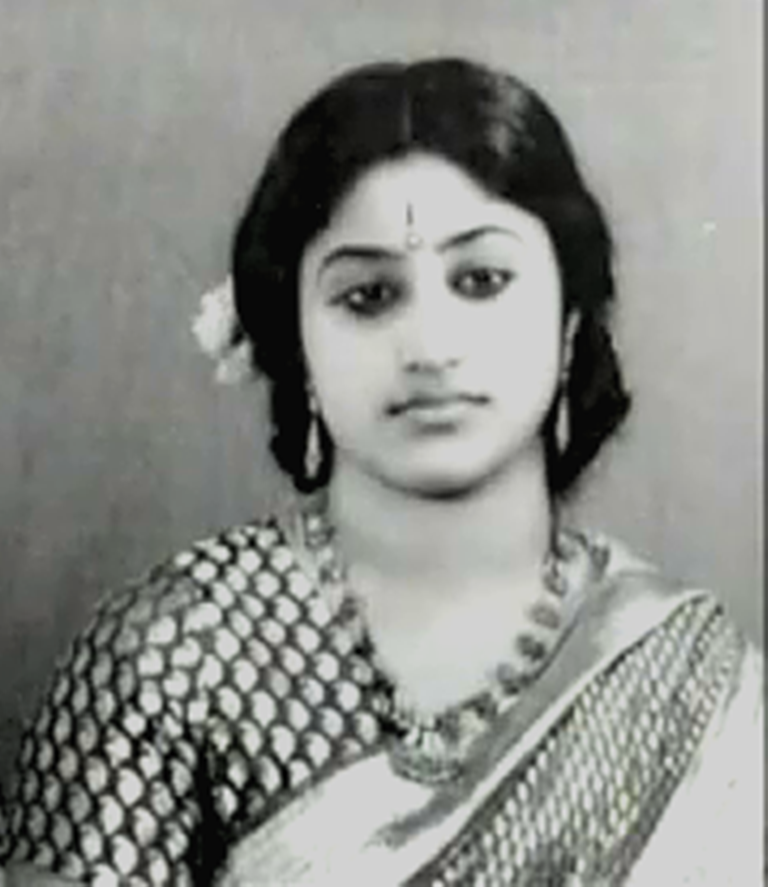
The consort of Sree Uthradom Thirunal Marthanda Varma

Sree Uthradom Thirunal joined the firm of Plymouth and Company at Bangalore in 1952, working there and also studying the functioning of industries at a basic level. He was the Chief Scout of the regional Boy Scout troop, and was also a patron of local hospitals and charities. He married Ammachi Panapillai Amma Srimathi Radhadevi Pandalai of Kayamkulam, daughter of Lieutenant-Colonel Krishnan Gopinathan Pandalai. He has a son, Ananthapadmanabhan Thampi and a daughter, Parvathi Devi Thankachi. Uthradom Thirunal resided at Pattom Palace, Trivandrum.

A vegetarian and teetotaller, he only drank milk. He won several trophies as an amateur horse rider. He played tennis, hockey, golf, football and polo. He learned photography in 1934 when his brother Sree Chithira Thirunal Bala Rama Varma Maharaja gave him a Rolleiflex camera, and built up a collection of about 5,000 negatives. He drove a lot, and won several medals from the Benz company at Stuttgart.

== Death ==
Sree Uthradom Thirunal was admitted to SUT Hospital in Thiruvananthapuram on 6 December 2013 following gastrointestinal bleeding. He died there of a cardiac arrest in the early hours of 16 December 2013, aged 91. He was cremated with full state honours at Pattom Palace, his residence, on the same day. He died during the Murajapam Ceremony in the Padmanabhaswamy Temple which he had organised. The state government declared a public holiday on 16 December as a mark of respect to him. Though Sree Uthradom Thirunal was the Titular Maharajah, the people called him 'Thampuran' and 'Thirumanassu' (lord or His Highness) with high esteem. Sree Uthradom Thirunal attended all cultural programmes in the Capital City of Thiruvananthapuram and escorted Sree Padmanabha his family deity twice a year for Arattu procession. His wife, Ammachi Panapillai Amma Srimathi Radhadevi Pandalai predeceased him in 1993. He was survived by his two children, Ananthapadmanabhan Thampi and Parvathi Devi Kochamma, both of them who died later.

== Successor ==
With the demise of Uthradom Thirunal, Moolam Thirunal Rama Varma became the titular Maharajah of Travancore and Revathi Thirunal Balagopal Varma, the titular Elayarajah.

== Titles ==
- 1922–1991: His Highness Maharajkumar Sree Marthanda Varma, Elaya Raja of Travancore
- 1991–2013: His Highness Lt. Col Sree Padmanabhadasa Sree Uthradom Thirunal Marthanda Varma Maharaja of Travancore Titular

== Honours ==
- King George V Silver Jubilee Medal, 1935
- King George VI Coronation Medal, 1937
- Indian Independence Medal, 1947

== Military Appointments ==
- Colonel Travancore University Labour Corps
- Lt. Col in The Nair Brigade (State Army of Travancore ,.Madras Regiment) and (Travancore-Cochin State Forces)
- Honorary Lt. Colonel in the Indian Army

== Biography ==
Mathrubhumi Books released a book named Thrippadi Daanam written by Uma Maheshwari featuring the biography of Uthradom Thirunal Marthanda Varma. The book starts from the year 925 ME (1750 AD) when the Travancore King Anizham Thirunal Veerabaala Marthanda Varma surrendered his country to Sree Padmanabha through an act referred to as Thrippadi Daanam. The book also covers art- cultural lifestyle of Travancore rulers and gives a personal account about his elder brother & sovereign, Sree Chithira Thirunal Balarama Varma.

== See also ==
- G. V. Raja
- Travancore Royal Family
- Maharajah
- Thampi
- Panapillai Amma

Uthradom Thirunal Marthanda Varma Kulasekhara Dynasty Born: 22 March 1922
Titles in pretence
Preceded by Chithira Thirunal	— TITULAR — Maharaja of Travancore; 1991–2013; Reason for succession failure: Indian Independence	Succeeded by Moolam Thirunal Rama Varma
