= List of Maharajas of Travancore =

The Maharaja of Travancore was the principal title of the ruler of the Kingdom of Travancore in the southern part of Kerala, India. The Maharaja of Travancore was the topmost ruler of Travancore until 1949, when Travancore was acceded to India. Since then, the Maharaja of Travancore has remained in a titular position.

== Maharajas and Maharanis of the Kingdom of Travancore ==
| Image | Name | Reign |
|---|---|---|
| | Rama Varma I | 1663–1672 |
| | Aditya Varma I | 1672–1677 |
| | Umayamma Rani | 1677–1684 (Regent Queen) |
| | Ravi Varma | 1684–1718 |
| | Aditya Varma II | 1718–1719 |
| | Unni Kerala Varma | 1719–1724 |
| | Rama Varma II | 1724–1729 |
| | Anizham Thirunal Marthanda Varma I | 1729–1758 |
| | Karthika Thirunal Rama Varma I (Dharma Raja) | 1758–1798 |
| | Avittom Thirunal Balarama Varma I | 1798–1810 |
| | Ayilyom Thirunal Gowri Lakshmi Bayi | 1810–1813 (Queen Regnant); 1813–1815 (Regent Queen) |
| | Uthrittathi Thirunal Gowri Parvati Bayi | 1815–1829 (Regent Queen) |
| | Swathi Thirunal Rama Varma II | 1829–1846 |
| | Uthram Thirunal Marthanda Varma II | 1846–1860 |
| | Ayilyam Thirunal Rama Varma III | 1860–1880 |
| | Visakham Thirunal Rama Varma IV | 1880–1885 |
| | Moolam Thirunal Rama Varma V | 1885–1924 |
| | Pooradam Thirunal Sethu Lakshmi Bayi | 1924–1931 (Regent Queen) |
| | Chithira Thirunal Balarama Varma II | 1931–1971 |

== Maharanis of the Kingdom of Travancore (Aatingal Rani ) ==
The rani of Attingal was the head of her principality and the eldest woman of the Trippapur svarupam. That meaning was specifically applied to the ranis of Attingal, in other parts of India this word had another definition. Because Travancore knew a marumakkathayam or matrilinear form of succession, the rani of Attingal had a special position. This meant that the eldest son of the rani was the first successor to Travancore's throne. His brothers and sisters were seated on the thrones of the other principalities. Therefore, the rani of Attingal could be seen as the mother of most of the royals in Travancore, and was succeeded by her own eldest daughter

| Image | Name | Reign | Consort | Notes |
|---|---|---|---|---|
| | HH Maharani Rani Rani Rukmini Bai | 1815–1837 | - | - |
| | HH Maharani Rani Gauri Parvati Bai | 1837–1853 | - | - |
| | HH Maharani HH Pooradam Thirunal Lakshmi Bayi | 1853–1857 | - | - |
| | HH Maharani Bharani Thirunal Lakshmi Bayi | 1857–1901 | Kerala Varma Valiya Koil ThampuranLakshmipuram Palace | Adopted HH Maharani Pooradam Thirunal Sethu Lakshmi Bayi, Elaya Thampuratti Moolam Thirunal Sethu Parvathi Bayi |
| | HH Maharani Poordam thirunal Sethu Lakshmi Bayi | 1901–1971 | Sri Rama varma Valiya Koyi Thapuran (Harippad Kottaram) | At the age of six, Sethu Lakshmi Bayi succeeded Bharani Thirunal Lakshmi Bayi as Maharani of Attingal/ Attingal Mootha Thapuran/ Travancore Maharani |

== Titular Maharaja ==
After British India became independent as two dominions in 1947, Chithira Thirunal agreed to accede his state to the new Dominion of India. Travancore was united with the neighbouring Cochin state and Chithira Thirunal served as Rajpramukh of the Travancore-Cochin Union from 1 July 1949 to 31 October 1956, which was the entire duration of the existence of that political entity. On 1 November 1956, the state of Kerala was created by uniting the Malayalam-speaking areas of the Travancore-Cochin Union with those of neighbouring Madras State, and Sree Chithira Thirunal's office of Rajpramukh came to an end. On 28 December 1971, Chithira Thirunal lost his privy purse and other privileges when the Indian government derecognized the rulers of the erstwhile princely states. Since then the head of the Travancore royal family is the pretender to the abolished title. The titular Maharaja fulfils his duties as Maharaja of Travancore in rituals related to the Padmanabhaswamy Temple. In 2012, the High Court of Kerala in a judgement on Mujeeba Rahman vs the State Of Kerala stated that, 'though by the 26th amendment of the Constitution, Article 363 was repealed whereby the rights and privileges of the rulers of Indian States were taken away, still the name and title of the rulers remained as such and unaffected in so far as names and titles were not contemplated as rights or privileges under the repealed Articles 291 and 362 of the Constitution.' So the titles were not abolished by the Government; only their political powers and right to receive Privy Purse were cancelled.

| Image | Name | Period |
|---|---|---|
| | Chithira Thirunal Balarama Varma II | 1971–1991 |
| | Uthradom Thirunal Marthanda Varma III | 1991–2013 |
| | Moolam Thirunal Rama Varma VI | 2013 – present |

== Titular Maharani ==
In 1971, the Indian government, through the 26th Amendment of the Constitution, repealed Article 363, thereby abolishing the rights and privileges of the rulers of Indian States. This action effectively ended the political powers and the right to receive the Privy Purse for these rulers. However, the titles and names of the rulers were not considered as rights or privileges under the repealed Articles 291 and 362 of the Constitution. As a result, the titles of the erstwhile rulers were not abolished by the government; only their political powers and financial privileges were revoked.

A notable example is the Travancore royal family, where the title of Maharani continues to hold cultural significance. The female head of the Travancore royal family traditionally holds the title of Maharani or Attingal Rani. Maharani Sethu Lakshmi Bayi, who left Travancore, retained her title until her death in 1985. After her, the title was passed to her sister's daughter, Karthika Thirunal Lakshmi Bayi, who held it from 1985 until her death in 2013. Subsequently, the title was briefly held by Maharani Pooradam Thirunal Sethu Lakshmi Bayi's elder daughter, Uthram Thirunal Lalithamba Bayi, from June to November 2013. After her death the title went to her younger sister, Karthika Thirunal Indira Bayi, who was the elder female head of the Travancore royal family from November 2013 until her death in July 2017.

Following the death of Karthika Thirunal Indira Bayi, the title passed to Uthram Thirunal Lalithamba Bayi's daughter Bharani Thirunal Rukmini Bayi Thampuran. Currently, she is the female head of the Travancore royal family and is considered the Attingal Rani and titular Maharani of Travancore. Despite her status, there is a tendency to overlook her presence in historical accounts as she resides in Bangalore rather than in Travancore.

| Image | Name | Reign |
|---|---|---|
| | HH Maharani Poordam thirunal Sethu Lakshmi Bayi | 1971–1985 At the age of six (1901), Sethu Lakshmi Bayi succeeded Bharani Thirunal Lakshmi Bayi as Maharani of Attingal/ Attingal Mootha Thapuran/ Travancore Maharani |
| | Karthika Thirunal Lakshmi Bayi | 1985–2008 Daughter of Junior Rani Sethu Parvathi Bayi of Attingal |
| | Uthram Thirunal Lalaithamba Bhai | 2008 June -2008 November (Elder Daughter of HH Maharani Poordam thirunal Sethu Lakshmi Bayi |
| | Karthika Thirunal Indira Bai | 2008 November -2017 July (Younger Daughter of HH Maharani Poordam thirunal Sethu Lakshmi Bayi |
| | Bharani Thirunal Rukmini Bayi/ Rukmini Varma | 2017 July- Present (granddaughter HH Maharani Poordam thirunal Sethu Lakshmi Bayi, Daughter of Uthram Thirunal Lalaithamba Bhai) |

== Titular Elayaraja ==
| Image | Name | Period |
|---|---|---|
| | Uthradom Thirunal Marthanda Varma III | 1971–1991 |
| | Moolam Thirunal Rama Varma VI | 1991 – 2013 |
| | Revathi Thirunal Balagopal Varma | 2013 – Present |

== More about ==
- Kingdom of Travancore
- Travancore royal family
- British Raj
