= Shreekumar Varma =

Indian writer

- Born: 1955 (age 70–71); Satelmond Palace, Poojapura, Thiruvananthapuram
- Occupations: Writer, poet, teacher
- Website: shreevarma.com

Shreekumar Varma is an Indian author, playwright, newspaper columnist and poet, known for the novels Lament of Mohini (Penguin, 2000), Maria's Room (HarperCollins, 2010) and Kipling's Daughter (AngloInk, 2018), the children's books, Devil's Garden: Tales Of Pappudom (Puffin, 2006), The Magic Store of Nu-Cham-Vu (Puffin, 2009), Pazhassi Raja: The Royal Rebel (Macmillan, 1997), and his collected plays, Five & Other Plays and Midnight Hotel & Other Plays, (collections of three plays each, both published by Adisakrit, 2019).

== Biography ==
Varma was born in 1955 in Satelmond Palace, Poojapura, Thiruvananthapuram. His parents left Kerala and settled down in Madras when he was four. He studied in the Good Shepherd Convent, the Madras Christian College High School and the Madras Christian College, from where he completed his MA and MPhil in English Literature. He also did a course in Journalism from the Bhavan's College of Journalism and Mass Communication. He took part in plays in school and college, and also participated in and devised programmes for All India Radio. He worked for the Indian Express and the Film Industry Journal (renamed Cinema Today) in Bombay. Back in Madras, he edited and published a magazine named Trident, and was associated with a printing press, as well as a publishing and creative training unit. He taught English Literature and Journalism at the Madras Christian College. He taught Creative English at the Chennai Mathematical Institute for 13 years. He was a charter member and President of the Rotary Club of Madras Southwest.

His mother, the late Karthika Tirunal Indira Bai (1926-2017), was the Matriarch of the Travancore Royal Family. His father, the late Kilimanoor Kerala Varma, was an advocate, industrialist, poet, novelist and translator. Shreekumar Varma is the grandson of the last ruling Maharani of Travancore, Sethu Lakshmi Bayi, and the great-grandson of the artist Raja Ravi Varma. He is a senior member of the Travancore Royal Family, after Moolam Thirunal Rama Varma and Revathi Thirunal Balagopal Varma.

He lives in Chennai with his wife Geeta, and is a full-time writer. He has two sons, Vinayak Varma and Karthik Varma, and a daughter-in-law, Yamini Vijayan. He is a cousin of artist Rukmini Varma.

== Literary works ==
His novels include Lament of Mohini (Penguin), Maria's Room (HarperCollins) and Kipling's Daughter (AngloInk). His books for children include Pazhassi Raja: The Royal Rebel (Macmillan), Devil's Garden (Puffin) and The Magic Store of Nu-Cham-Vu (Puffin). The Magic Store of Nu-Cham-Vu and "Maria's Room" are also available as digital "talking" books for the blind and the dyslexic. His collected plays include Five & Other Plays and Midnight Hotel & Other Plays, (collections of three plays each, both published by Adisakrit, 2019).

His two award-winning plays, The Dark Lord (directed by Vinod Anand) and Bow Of Rama (dir. Noshir Ratnakar), were staged by The British Council (1986) and The Madras Players (1993) respectively. His play, Platform, was staged by The Madras Players in January 2005. (dir. N. S. Yamuna) His play Midnight Hotel (Madras Players) had ten shows in Chennai and Bangalore in March, April, May and August 2009. It raised more than ₨ 4 million for the social service programmes of the Christian Medical College, Vellore. (dir. Mithran Devanesen) His play Nathu's Dream (Bala Vidya Mandir) was produced as a musical in September 2010. (dir. Neeta Shrikanth) His political play Five (Thespian en) was performed as supper theatre to a packed Chennai audience in November 2010, and later in the Mutha Venkata Subba Rao Auditorium, Chennai, in 2017 (dir. Ajit Chitturi). His play Cast Party premiered to full houses in March 2012. It was produced by The Madras Players and Boardwalkers and directed by Michael Muthu. His play Sisters (Thespian En) was staged in Alliance Francaise, Chennai in September, 2019. (dir. Ajit Chitturi) His first short play Ganga at Rishikesh premiered at The Hindu MetroPlus Theatre Fest in Chennai in August 2012. It was produced by Stray Factory and directed by Mathivanan Rajendran and Venkatesh Harinathan. His other short plays include "Kichadi Express", "Demeanings" and "Intervention", all performed at the Alliance Francaise, Chennai.

He has written regular columns for The Hindu, The New Indian Express, The Economic Times Madras Plus, Ritz Magazine, Fiji Times, Chennai Times and the Deccan Herald, for which he also reviews books.

He has contributed poetry, fiction and non-fiction to several anthologies, including Poetry Society of India volumes, Aesthetica Quarterly Review, Pulse Berlin Magazine, A Hudson View Poetry Digest, Where The Rain Is Born: Writings from Kerala (Penguin), The Puffin Book of Poetry for Children, the Puffin Book of Funny Stories, The Tenth Rasa: An Anthology of Indian Nonsense (Penguin), A Cup Of Chai & Other Stories (Unisun Publications), Favourite Stories for Boys (Puffin), Bring Down The House Lights (The Madras Players), Tonight: An Anthology of World Love Poetry (The Poets Printery, East London, S. Africa), Kerala Kerala, Quite Contrary (Rupa Publications), Get Smart: Writing Skills (Puffin), Chicken Soup For The Indian Spiritual Soul (Westland), Why We Don't Talk (Rupa), Dark Moon Rising (Puffin), Urban Voice 04 (Leadstart), Funny Stories for 7-year olds (Puffin), Only Men Please (Unisun), Indo-Australian Anthology of Contemporary Poetry (Authorspress), Indo-Australian Anthology of Short Fiction (Authorspress), My Faith and Others (ed. Anand Amaladass, Padma V. Mckertich and Anwar Syed), and On Your Marks (Speaking Tiger).

He has translated poetry and fiction from the original Malayalam into English for the OUP Anthology of Malayalam Dalit Writings in Translation (Oxford University Press).

== Awards and recognitions ==
He received the R. K. Narayan Award for Excellence in Writing in English in 2015.

He was awarded the Charles Wallace Fellowship for the year 2004, and was Writer-in-Residence at Stirling University, Scotland.

His debut novel Lament of Mohini was Longlisted for the Crossword Book Award. It featured on the Asian Age Top Ten List.

His novel Maria's Room was Longlisted for the inaugural Man Asian Literary Prize (2007). It featured on the India Today Top 20 List.

His children's book The Magic Store of Nu-Cham-Vu was Shortlisted for the Vodafone Crossword Book Award 2009.

His poetry was used as text for the dance recitals Vamshi and Monsoon by noted Bharatanatyam exponent Indira Kadambi.

His play "The Dark Lord" was awarded II prize in the British Council South India Playwrights Competition.

His play "Bow of Rama" won first prize in The Hindu All-India Playscripts competition.

His play "Deep Inside" (re-titled "Midnight Hotel" for performance) was Longlisted for the first MetroPlus Playscripts competition.

His play "Platform" was selected to launch the 50th year celebrations of The Madras Players, India's oldest running English theatre group.

He was on the Jury of the International Red Cross Society of India - Press Institute of India Award for Best Reporting from Conflict Zones, and the inaugural The Hindu Fiction Award, and also the Karadi Tales and Deccan Herald short story contests and the Prakriti Foundation poetry competition.

== See also ==
- Travancore royal family
- Raja Ravi Varma
- Sethu Lakshmi Bayi
- Theatre of India
- List of people from Kerala/ Writers
