= Karthika Thirunal Lakshmi Bayi =

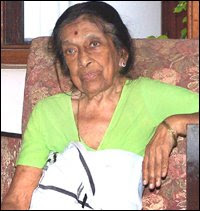

Maharani of Travancore; Attingal Mootha Thampuran
- Reign: (1985–2008 Titular Maharani)
- Predecessor: Sethu Lakshmi Bayi
- Successor: Uthram Thirunal Lalaithamba Bhai (2008 June to November 2008 ) Karthika Thirunal Indira Bai (2008 November to 2017 July) current; Bharani Thirunal Rukmini Bayi
- Born: 17 September 1916; Travancore
- Died: 8 June 2008 (aged 91); Thiruvananthapuram
- Spouse: Lt. Col. P. R. Godavarma Raja of Poonjar Royal House (m. 1934; died 1971)
- Issue: Avittom Thirunal Rama Varma; Pooyam Thirunal Gowri Parvathi Bayi; Aswathi Thirunal Gowri Lakshmi Bayi; Moolam Thirunal Rama Varma
Names
- Sree Padmanabhasevini Vanchidarma Vardhini Raja Rajeshwari Maharani Karthika Thirunal Lakshmi Bayi, Attingal Mootha Thampuran and the Maharani of Travancore
- House: Venad Swaroopam; Kulasekhara (Second Chera) Royal Dynasty
- Father: Pooram Nal Ravi Varma of Kilimanur Palace
- Mother: Amma Maharani Moolam Thirunal Sethu Parvathi Bayi
- Religion: Hinduism

Maharani Karthika Thirunal Lakshmi Bayi (1916-2008) was the only sister of the last ruling Maharajah of Travancore, Sree Chithira Thirunal Balarama Varma and of his successor, Sree Uthradom Thirunal Marthanda Varma. Under the matrilineal Marumakkathayam system of inheritance prevalent in the kingdom of Travancore, it was her children who were heirs to the throne. She therefore held a special place in the Travancore court, superior to the Maharaja's wives, and was termed the Rani of Attingal in her own right. In 2013, her only surviving son succeeded his uncles as titular Maharaja of Travancore and is known as Moolam Thirunal Rama Varma.

== Early years ==
Born as the only daughter of Queen Mother Sethu Parvathi Bayi and Sri Ravi Varma Koyi Thampuran of Kilimanoor, she married Lt. Col. G. V. Raja. According to Oneindia online daily she was a witness to major events in pre-independence and independent India, was an accomplished dancer, singer and a linguist as well. In accordance to the tradition, she was also the Chief of Attingal Fiefdom, known as Mootha Thampuran.

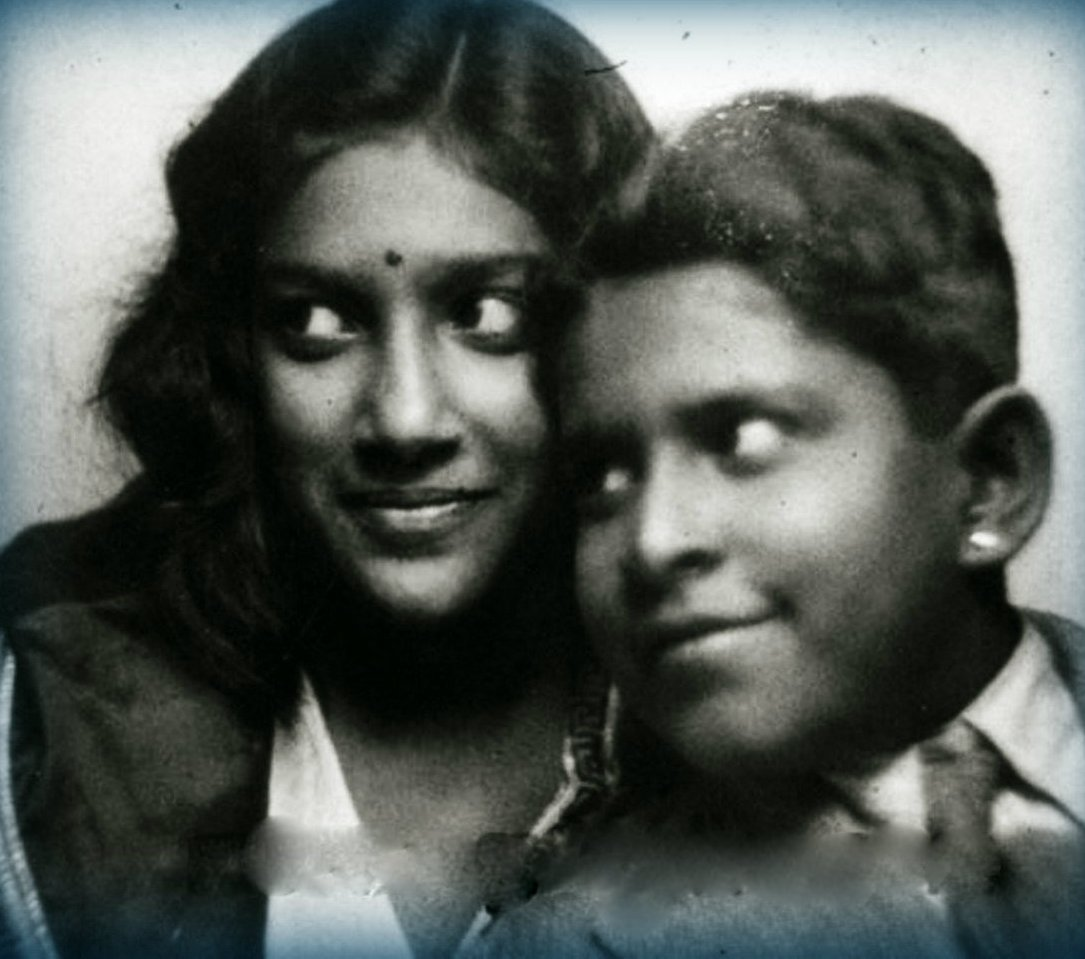
Karthika Thirunal with her younger brother, future Maharaja Uthradom Thirunal Marthanda Varma.

She was born as the only daughter of Sanskrit scholar and aristocrat Sri Pooram Nal Ravi Varma Kochu Kovil Tampuran of Kilimanoor Kovilakam and Amma Maharani Moolam Thirunal Sethu Parvathi Bayi of Travancore, on 17 September 1916, in the matrilineal Royal House of Travancore. She was educated by selected tutors and scholars. She mastered languages like Malayalam, Sanskrit, English, French etc. Since her childhood, Karthika was deeply interested in dance and music. Recognizing her interests, her elder brother, Maharajah Sree Chithira Thirunal, appointed Harikeshanelloor Muthaiyya Bhagavathar as her music teacher. In 1933, at the age of 16, Karthika Thirunal became the first from her family to undertake a sea voyage with her mother, against the then prevalent superstitious belief related to crossing the sea. She also participated in the All India Women's Conference of 1935, held in Thiruvananthapuram.

== Royal wedding ==
As soon as Karthika Thirunal turned 16, it was decided to get her married. Usually, the Koyi Thampurans were chosen as bridegrooms for Travancore Princesses and Queens. According to Uthradom Thirunal, Maharajah Sree Chithira Thirunal and Sethu Parvathi Bayi ignored the superiority of Koyi Thampurans and got her married to a young aristocrat named P.R. Godavarma Raja of Poonjar Palace. The Maharajah felt that it was fine to make a different choice so as to find a suitable spouse for his sister and for the first time chose a bridegroom from the Poonjar Royal House.

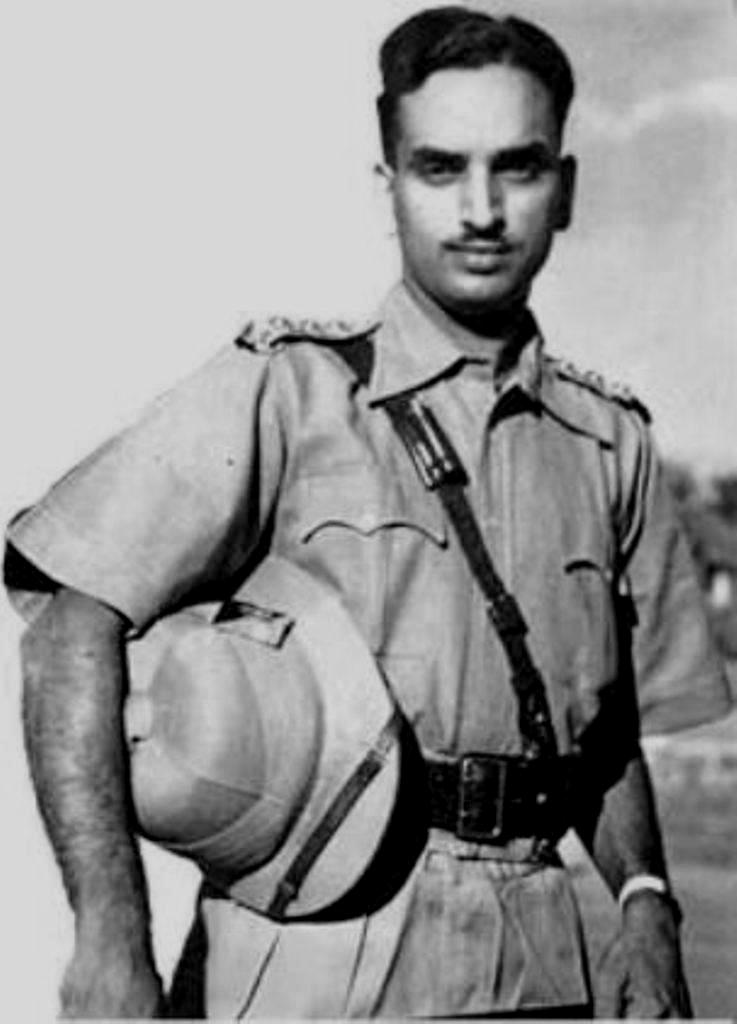
Lt. Col. P. R. Godavarma Raja – Prince Consort of Karthika Thirunal Lakshmi Bayi during his military days

When P.R. Ramavarma Raja, (husband of Karthika Thirunal's maternal aunt), visited Kowdiar Palace, he put forward the name of his younger brother Godavarma Raja (Col.G. V. Raja) as a prospective bridegroom for Karthika Thirunal. Godavarma Raja who later attained immortal fame as the King of Kerala Sports and Tourism, at the time of the proposal was studying in Madras for attaining a Degree in Medicine. The couple met each other in 1933. Godavarma accepted the wedding proposal for Karthika Thirunal's hand and discontinued his education there. Karthika Thirunal's family too approved, and the wedding was thus announced. It was the first time a Travancore Princess married some one other than a Koyi Thampuran. Poonjar Royal Family is believed to be the descendants of Pandya Dynasty.

The preparations for the Pallikettu (wedding of a Travancore Princess)began in 1933 itself. Huge wedding venue was created at Sundara Vilasom Palace. Many prominent Indian Royals were invited for the wedding and the wedding was a lavish affair. The wedding of 17-year-old Karthika Thirunal and 26-year-old Godavarma Raja took place on 24 January 1934. The royal couple stayed at Kovalam for their honeymoon and it was during this time, Godavarma Raja, smitten by the beauty of the place, decided to develop and promote Kovalam as a tourist destination. After their wedding, G. V. Raja joined the Travancore State Force (Army) and served as a Lt. Colonel and as one of the commanding officers of the Nair Brigade (Travancore King's Bodyguards).

The couple had four children, Elayarajah (Crown Prince) Avittom Thirunal Rama Varma (1938–1944, died at the age of six of a rheumatic heart condition), Pooyam Thirunal Gowri Parvati Bayi (1941), Aswathi Thirunal Gowri Lakshmi Bayi (1945) and Sree Moolam Thirunal Rama Varma (1949), the Titular Maharajah of Travancore and the Head of Travancore Royal Family & Supreme Guardian/Custodian of Sree Padmanabhaswami Temple. In the memory of his late nephew, Prince Avittom Thirunal, Maharajah Chithira Thirunal Balarama Varma built the SAT Hospital in Trivandrum.

== Full title ==
Her Highness Sree Padmanabhasevini Vanchidharma Vardhini Raja Rajeshwari Maharani Karthika Thirunal Lakshmi Bayi, Attingal Mootha Thampuran and the Maharani of Travancore
