= Punjala =

Punjala is a given name and a surname. Notable people with the name include:

- Alekhya Punjala (born 1962), Indian dancer
- Punjala Shiv Shankar (1929–2017), Indian politician
