= K. Siji =

K. Siji is the first lady Daffadar in Kerala. She was appointed as Daffadar in November 2024, at the time of working at Alappuzha Collectorate, as senior office attendant. She was an international Powerlifting star and she has achieved G. V. Raja Award for Indian sports people.
