= Alekhya Punjala =

Kuchipudi Dancer Natya Garuvu

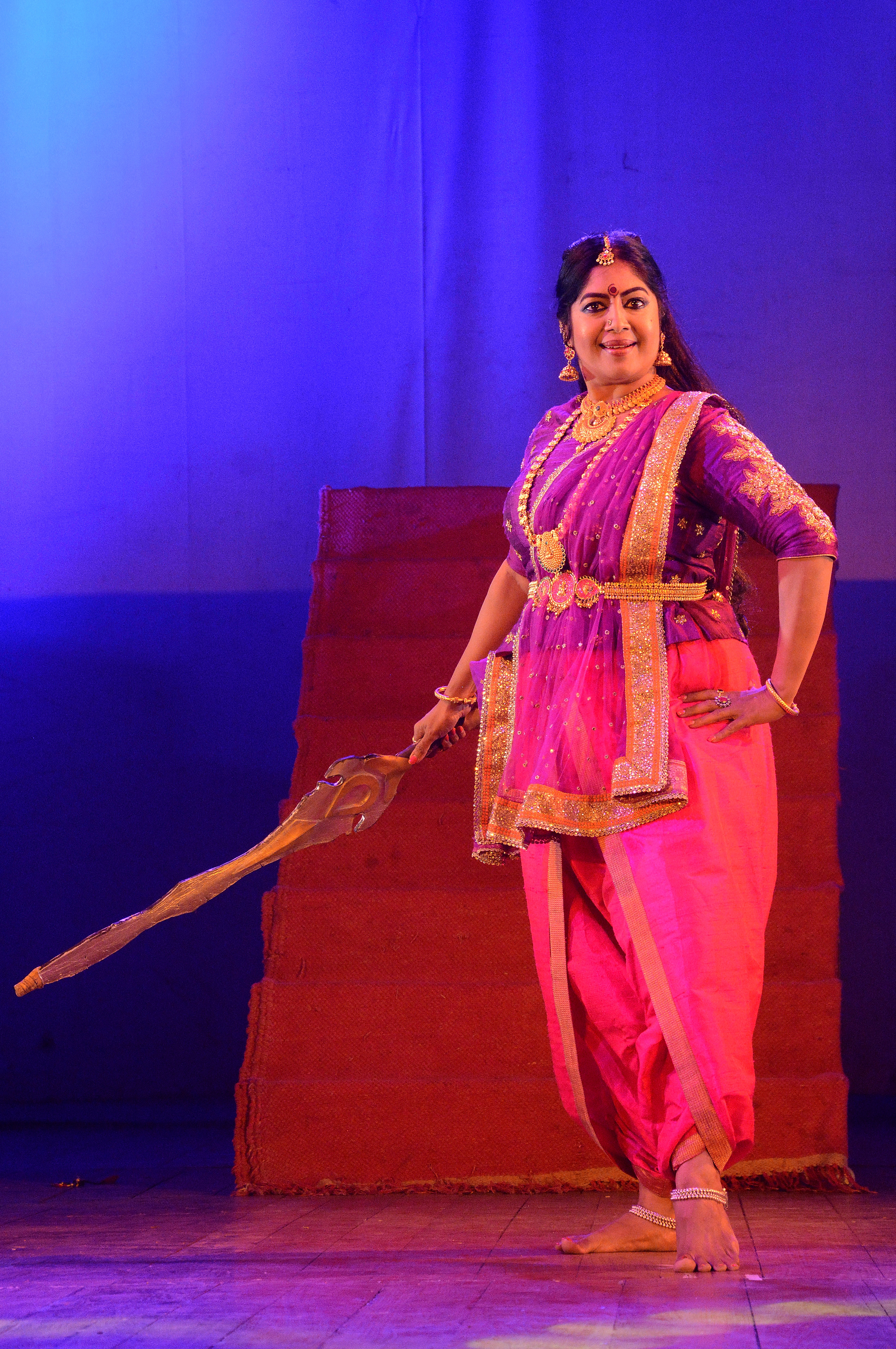
- Alekhya Punjala as Rudrama Devi in a Kuchupidi performance
- Born: 9 April 1962 (age 63); Hyderabad, Telangana
- Occupations: Kuchipudi and Bharatanatyam dancer, Dance teacher and choreographer
- Awards: Padma Shri; Sangeet Natak Akademi Award; Hamsa Award

Alekhya Punjala is an Indian classical dancer, choreographer and dance teacher from Telangana. She is an exponent in Kuchipudi and Bharatanatyam. She has received the Ugadi Vishishtha Award and the Hamsa Award from the Andhra Pradesh government. She received the Sangeet Natak Akademi Award for Kuchipudi in 2011. She has also been awarded the Padma Shri by the Government of India.

== Biography ==
Alekhya was born on 9 April 1962, in Hyderabad, Telangana, India. Her husband P. Vinay Kumar is a surgeon-gastroenterologist. They married in 1982 and the couple has two sons, Sashwath Punjala and Devansh Punjala.

== Career ==
Alekhya Punjala is a Kuchipudi and Bharatanatyam dancer from Telangana. She began her dance studies at the age of four while studying in a Montessori school in Hyderabad, under Dayal Sharan, the dance teacher of the school. She said that Dayal intended to teach her Odissi and Kathak, but she became interested in Bharatanatyam and Kuchipudi. Later, she trained in Kuchipudi and Bharatanatyam under Uma Rama Rao, and in abhinaya (acting) under Guru Pashumarthi Krishnamurthy. She has been performing classical dance since her arangetram (first stage performance) in 1977, which was on the occasion of silver jubilee celebrations of the Indian National Theatre.

Alekhya holds a bachelor's degree in English literature, psychology, and philosophy; a master's degree in dance (Bharatanatyam) from Osmania University; and a master's degree in ancient Indian history, culture, and archaeology. Alekhya received her PhD for her study of the acting aspect of Kuchipudi dance, with title Kshetrayya Padams and their importance in Abhinaya in Kuchipudi Dance. She was a student at Potti Sreeramulu Telugu University and later became Professor and Head of the Department of Dance. She then became the university's first woman registrar. Later, to focus on teaching and performing, she took voluntary retirement from her position as registrar at the university.

Alekhya is one of the top ranked artist of Doordarshan and also a panel member of Indian Council for Cultural Relations. In 2024, Alekhya Punjala was appointed as the chairperson of Telangana Sangeetha Nataka Academy.

She also runs a dance school called Trishna.

== Notable performances ==
The 90-minute dance drama depicting Mandodari, the wife of Ravana, performed on the sixth day of Kalasagaram's annual festival, was noted. Her dance performance as Rudrama Devi, Dushala and Chakali Ilamma are also noteworthy. She has performed many works in Kuchipudi dance form, including Annamacharya Kirtans, poems of Kshetrayya, works of Thyagaraja, Narayana Teertha, Rabindranath Tagore's works, and also choreographed on themes such as 'Bhakti Movement in Dance'.

== Awards and honors ==
Alekhya is a recipient of the Pratibha Rajiv Puraskar (2009), Ugadi Vishishtha Award (2002) and the Hamsa Award from the Andhra Pradesh government. She received the Sangeet Natak Akademi Award for Kuchipudi in 2011. In 2015 she received the Telangana State Award in arts. She has also been awarded the Padma Shri by the Government of India.

At a function held to mark the 75th anniversary of Indian Independence, Alekhya Punjala was honoured by then Telangana Chief Minister K. Chandrashekar Rao for her contributions to the field of dance. The Sahitya Peetha of Andhra Pradesh honored her with the title of "Abhinaya Tapaswini".
