= Aswathi Thirunal Gowri Lakshmi Bayi =

Indian writer (born 1945)

Aswathy Thirunal Gowri Lakshmi Bayi
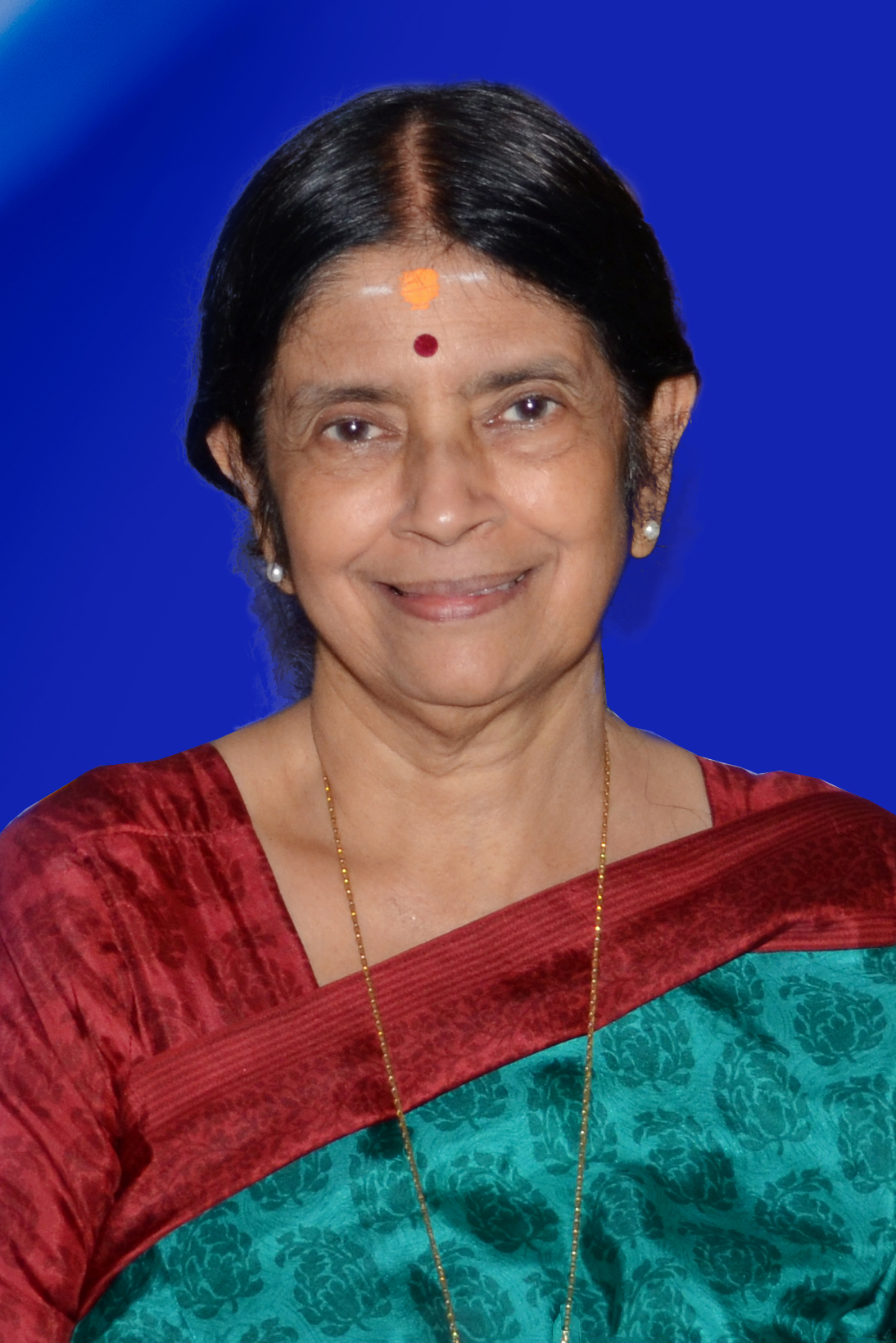
- Born: Gowri Lakshmi Bayi; Travancore
- Citizenship: India
- Education: Graduate in Economics
- Occupation: Writer
- Spouse(s): Sri Vishakham Nal Sukumaran Raja Raja Varma of Paliyakkara West Palace, Thiruvalla (m. 1963–2005)
- Children: 3
- Parents: G. V. Raja (father); Karthika Thirunal Lakshmi Bayi (mother)
- Writing career
- Pen name: Gauri Lakshmi Bai
- Language: English
- Period: 1994-
- Notable works: The Dawn (1994); Kerala Temple Architecture: Some Notable Features (1997); Sree Padmanabha Swamy Temple (1998); Thulsi Garland (1998); The Mighty Indian Experience (2002); Budhadarśanaṃ: lēkhanaṅṅaḷ (2007); Glimpses of Kerala Culture (2011); Rudrakshamala (2014)
- Notable awards: Padma Shri 2024

Aswathy Thirunal Gowri Lakshmi Bayi (born 1945) is an Indian writer from Kerala and a member of the Travancore Royal Family. She has fourteen books to her credit. Aswathy Thirunal is the niece of the last King of Travancore, Chithira Thirunal Balarama Varma. She was awarded India's fourth highest civilian award the Padma Shri in 2024.

== Birth and education ==
Aswathy Thirunal was born on 4 July 1945 as the third child of Maharani Karthika Thirunal Lakshmi Bayi of the Travancore Royal Family and Lt. Col G. V. Raja. Her siblings are Avittom Thirunal Rama Varma (1938–1944), Pooyam Thirunal Gowri Parvati Bayi (1942) and Moolam Thirunal Rama Varma (1949), the present scion of Travancore. She was educated at home by Anglo-Indian tutors along with her siblings. After finishing school, she attended the Government College for Women, Thiruvananthapuram, graduating with a degree in economics in 1966.

=== Marriage ===
At the age of 18 in 1963, Aswathy Thirunal married 26-year-old Vishakham Nal Sukumaran Raja Raja Varma, a member of the Paliyakkara West Palace of Thiruvalla. The couple had two sons and an adopted daughter. Raja Raja Varma died on 30 December 2005 from injuries received in a car accident. Her eldest son Prince Pooruruttathi Thirunal Marthanda Varma is married to dancer Gopika Varma, the couple have a son and reside in Chennai. Her second son Prince Avittom Thirunal Aditya Varma married Shrimathi Resmi Varma of Mariapalli Palace, Kottayam in 2000 the couple has twin daughters.

== Literary works ==
Aswathi Thirunal has written on subjects such as the temples of Travancore and Kerala architecture, as well as three collections of English poems, numerous articles in newspapers, and books on the culture and heritage of India — 14 books in total. Some of her important works are: The Dawn (1994), Kerala Temple Architecture: Some Notable Features (1997), Sree Padmanabha Swamy Temple (1998), Thulsi Garland (1998), The Mighty Indian Experience (2002), Budhadarśanaṃ: lēkhanaṅṅaḷ (2007), Glimpses of Kerala Culture (2011), Rudrakshamala (2014),An Amateur's Attempt at Poetry (2018) and History Liberated - The Sree Chithra Saga. According to critics, her book Sree Padmanabha Swamy Temple published in 1998 is a comprehensive work on the ancient temple. The book is extremely popular and has run into several editions. It was translated into Malayalam by K. Shankaran Nambuthiri and K. Jayakumar. Her latest book The Patchwork Quilt was released by Dr Shashi Tharoor in 2026. It is a collection of her selected speeches and articles.

== See also ==
- Thiruvananthapuram Kombans FC
