= Moolam Thirunal Rama Varma =

Maharaja of Travencore

- Titular Maharajah of Travancore (monarchy abolished); Head of the Travancore royal family
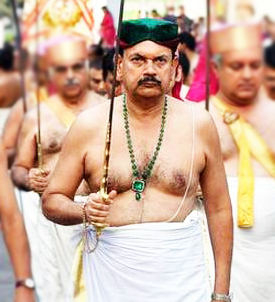
- Sree Padmanabhadasa Moolam Thirunal Rama Varma

Titular Maharaja Of Travancore and Head of the Travancore royal family
- Reign: 16 December 2013 – present
- Coronation: 3 January 2014
- Predecessor: Uthradom Thirunal Marthanda Varma
- Heir apparent: Revathi Thirunal Balagopal Varma
- Born: 12 June 1949 (age 77); Thiruvananthapuram, Travancore-Cochin, Dominion of India (present-day Kerala, India)
- Spouse: Ammachi Panampillai Amma Srimathi Rema Varma of Kilimanoor Kovilakam (m. 1976; div. 2002); Dr. Girija Thankachi (m. 2002)
- Issue: None
Names
- Sree Padmanabhadasa Sree Moolam Thirunal Rama Varma
Regnal name
- His Highness Sree Padmanabha Dasa Vanchipala Sree Moolam Thirunal Rama Varma Kulasekhara Kiritapati, Manney Sultan Maharajah Raja Ramaraja Bahadur, Shamsher Jang, Maharajah of Travancore (Titular)
- Dynasty: Kulasekhara
- Father: Lt. Col. Godavarma Raja of Kanjiramattom Palace, Poonjar
- Mother: Maharani Karthika Thirunal Lakshmi Bayi of Travancore Royal Family
- Religion: Hinduism
- Occupation: Managing Director of Aspinwall Ltd. and Hereditary Head Trustee of Sree Padmanabhaswamy Temple

Sree Padmanabhadasa Sree Moolam Thirunal Rama Varma (born 12 June 1949) is the current incumbent to the throne of Travancore. He is the youngest of the four children of the former titular Maharani of Travancore, Sree Padmanabhasevini Maharani Karthika Thirunal Lakshmi Bayi and her husband, Prince Consort Lt. Col. G. V. Raja of Poonjar Royal House.

Rama Varma is the only nephew of the last reigning King of Travancore, Sree Chithira Thirunal Balarama Varma and succeeded the late titular Maharaja of Travancore, Sree Padmanabhadasa Sree Uthradom Thirunal Marthanda Varma, his maternal uncle. He is the managing director of the family-owned spice trading company, Aspinwall Ltd. As the head of the royal family, he along with his consort, moved to Thiruvananthapuram in 2013 and settled down at Kowdiar Palace, in order to keep up with the ritual duties of being the custodian of the Sree Padmanabhaswamy Temple.

== Early life ==
Rama Varma is the youngest son of Maharani Karthika Thirunal Lakshmi Bayi of Travancore and her husband, Prince Consort Lt. Col. G. V. Raja, and was born on 12 June 1949 in Thiru-Kochi. His siblings are the late Crown Prince (Elayarajah) Sree Padmanabhadasa Sree Avittom Thirunal Rama Varma (died at the age of 6 due to rheumatic heart disease, long before he was born), Princess Pooyam Thirunal Gowri Parvathi Bayi and the writer, Princess Aswathi Thirunal Gowri Lakshmi Bayi. Like his father, Rama Varma is also an avid sports and book lover. He was educated privately by select tutors in various subjects. He later graduated from Mar Ivanios College, Thiruvananthapuram, with Physics as his selective subject. Then he moved to Kolkata and worked there for some years. He then went to England to learn business management and worked there for a year.

== Later life and marriage ==
After finishing his higher education and working in England, Rama Varma returned to India in 1972 and, at his uncles' advise, joined the spice trading company Aspinwall Ltd in Mangalore. Rama Varma served as a consultant and in various executive positions like, Additional Director (2004–2005), Director of Planning (2005–2007), Executive Director Aspinwall & Co Travancore Ltd (since 2005), Member of Aspinwall Promoter Group (since 2005), managing director of Aspinwall and Co Ltd in Mangalore (since 2008). In 2002 he married Ammachi Panapillai Amma Srimathi Girija Thankachi of Vazhuthacadu, alias Dr. Girija Rama Varma, former radiologist based in London. After their 2002 wedding the couple lived in Mangalore until 2013. After Rama Varma assumed the Titular Maharajah's position (due to his maternal uncle's death), they moved to Kowdiar, Thiruvananthapuram. He is childless. According to the matrilineal rules of descent in the family, the next in line of succession would be his cousin: Revathi Thirunal Balagopal Varma, the son of Uthram Thirunal Lalithamba Bayi (daughter of HH Maharani Pooradam Thirunal Sethu Lakshmi Bayi of Travancore) and her husband Sri Kerala Varma of Kilimanoor from the Bangalore branch and Prince Ravi, Prince Raghu and Prince Aditya from Travancore branch. Currently, the title of Attingal Rani / Attingal Mootha Thampuran / Maharani of Travancore is held by Bharani Thirunal Rukmini Bayi Rukmini Varma, the sister of Revathi Thirunal Balagopal Varma.

== Titular Maharajah of Travancore ==
Rama Varma became the Elayarajah of Travancore when Maharajah Sree Chithira Thirunal Balarama Varma died on 20 July 1991. When Balarama Varma's titular successor, Sree Uthradom Thirunal Marthanda Varma died on 16 December 2013, Rama Varma became the Titular Maharajah of Travancore. He was appointed. after a function called Thirumudikalasam, as the head of the Travancore Royal Family on 3 January 2014 at Kalasamandapam near the Sree Padmanabhaswamy Temple. After rituals and traditional formalities, Tharananalloor Parameswaran Namboodiripad, the temple Tantri (high priest), poured 'punyajalam' (holy water) over Rama Varma, making him the new head of the royal family. The anointment function was a very private affair and only the closest family members and priests took part in it. Rama Varma, as of now, is also the supreme guardian or custodian of Sree Padmanabhaswamy Temple, Thiruvananthapuram. After his installation, he arrived at the Kulasekhara Mandapam of the temple where the Ettara Yogam presided over by the Pushpanjali Swamiyar held a meeting. The Yogam recognised Rama Varma as Chirava Mooppan and Thrippappoor Mooppan, and the Swamiyar signed on the neettu. His full title is: His Highness Sree Padmanabha Dasa Vanchipala Sree Moolam Thirunal Rama Varma, Kulasekhara Kiritapati Manney, Maharajah of Travancore.

== See also ==
- G. V. Raja
- Travancore Royal Family
- Maharajah
- Thampi and Thankachi
- Panapillai Amma

Moolam Thirunal Rama Varma Kulasekhara Dynasty Born: 12 June 1949
Titles in pretence
Preceded by Uthradom Thirunal Marthanda Varma	— TITULAR — Maharaja of Travancore; 16 December 2013 – present Reason for succession failure: Indian independence and accession to the Dominion of India	Incumbent
