= Rukmini Varma =

Indian artist based in Bangalore (born 1940)

Bharani Thirunal Rukmini Bayi
- Rani of Attingal (Maharani of Travancore), Princess of Travancore
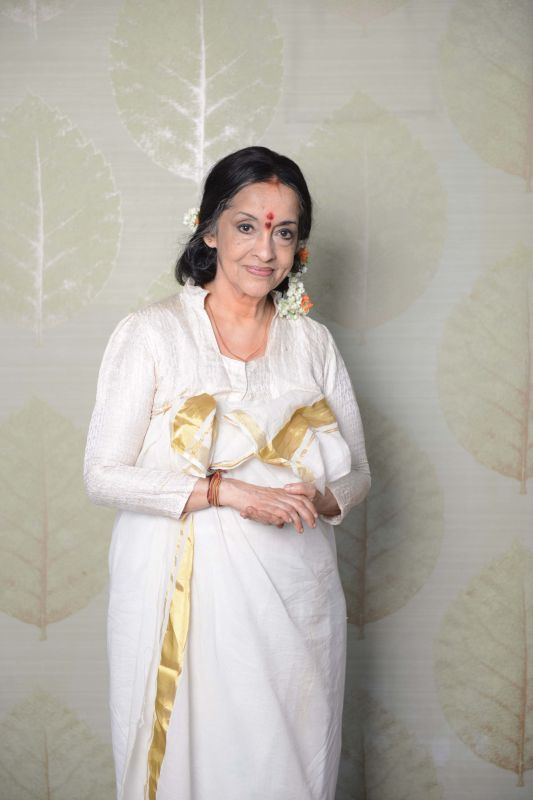
- Maharani of Travancore; Attingal Mootha Thampuran

Senior Rani of Attingal (Maharani of Travancore)
- Reign: (2017 July - present)
- Predecessor: Karthika Thirunal Indira Bhai

Junior Rani of Attingal
- Reign: (2008 November- 2017 July)
- Predecessor: Karthika Thirunal Indira Bhai
- Successor: Bharani Thirunal Uma Bayi
- Born: 1940 (age 85–86); Travancore
- Spouse: P.R. Devi Prasad Varma (Poonjar Royal Family)
- Issue: Venugopal Varma, Jayagopal Varma, Renjith Varma
- House: Venad Swaroopam; Kulasekhara (Second Chera) Royal Dynasty
- Father: Sri Kerala Varma Koil Thampuran (Kilimanoor Palace)
- Mother: Princess Uthram Thirunal Lalithamba Bayi (Elder Daughter of HH maharani Pooradam thirunal Sethu Lakshmi Bayi
- Religion: Hinduism

Rukmini Varma, Rani of Attingal, Princess of Travancore (born 1940) is a member of the Travancore Royal family, a Princess, Maharani, former socialite and artist based in Bangalore.

== Early Life & upbringing ==
She was born Bharani Thirunal Rukmini Bayi, Fourth Princess of Travancore, to Princess Uthram Thirunal Lalithamba Bayi and Uthrattathi Thirunal Sri R Kerala Varma Koil Thampuran Avargal. She is a granddaughter of Maharani Sethu Lakshmi Bayi and belongs to the Travancore Royal Family. Her great-great-grandfather was Raja Ravi Varma. Her father, Kerala Varma, is an artist specializing in charcoal and pencil sketches, while her son, Jay Varma, is a coloured pencil artist.

Her upbringing in Satelmond Palace, amid art and nature, inspired her later pursuits in the fields of performing arts and painting. She later went on to learn Bharatanatyam and classical dance under U.S. Krishna Rao, Chandrabhaga Devi, and Uma Rama Rao.

== Career and charity ==
Princess Rukmini established herself as a painter in the mid-1960s and soon began to create work acclaimed by many. Her painting style, unique and voluptuous in nature, was praised by many notable figures.

Throughout the 1960s, Princess Rukmini was frequently featured in publications and magazines such as Femina. Her royal background was often a subject of discussion among society circles internationally and in Bangalore.

In 1973, President V. V. Giri was present at one of her art exhibitions. In 1976, Lord Mountbatten inagaurated one of her exhibits in India House, London.

In the 1970s she was a member of the advisory council for the Karnataka Chitrakala Parishath of Bangalore and is currently Chairperson of the Raja Ravi Varma Heritage Foundation, Bangalore, which she founded in September 2015.

Rukmini Varma is a cousin of Shreekumar Varma. She was married to the late Devi Prasad Varma and has two sons, Venugopal Varma and Jaygopal Varma. Her brother Balagopal Varma is the current holder of the title of Elayaraja of Travancore.

Following the death of Karthika Thirunal Indira Bayi, the title of Attingal Rani/Attingal Mootha Thampuran /Titular Maharani of Travancore passed to Rukmini Varama. Currently, she is the female head of the Travancore royal family and is considered the Attingal Rani, as well as the titular Maharani of Travancore. Despite her status, there is a tendency to overlook her presence in historical accounts as she resides in Bangalore rather than in Travancore.

Her Full Name -Sree Padmanabhasevini Vanchidarma Vardhini Raja Rajeshwari Maharani Bharani Thirunal Rukmini Bayi, Attingal Mootha Thampuran and the Maharani of Travancore

== See also ==
- Indian Art
- Travancore Royal Family
