= Revathi Thirunal Balagopal Varma =

- Titular Elayaraja of Travancore (monarchy abolished)

Titular Elayaraja of Travancore
- Reign: 2013 December 16 - Present
- Predecessor: Moolam Thirunal Rama Varma
- Born: July 1953 (age 73); Bangalore
- House: Venad Swaroopam; Kulasekhara
- Father: Uthrittathinnal Kerala Varma Koil Thampuran of Kilimanoor Palace
- Mother: Princess Uthram Thirunal Lalithamba Bayi (Daughter of HH Maharani Pooradam Thirunal Sethu Lakshmi Bayi
- Religion: Hinduism

His Highness Revathi Thirunal Balagopal Varma (born 1953), son of Princess Uthram Thirunal Lalithamba Bayi (1923-2008) and Uthrittathi Nal Kerala Varma Koil Thampuran, is the titular Elayaraja of Travancore. Revathi Thirunal is the grandson of the Maharani of Travancore, H.H. Sree Padmanabhasevini Maharani Sree Pooradom Thirunal Sethu Lakshmi Bayi. He is also the great great grandson of the artist Raja Ravi Varma and brother of Rukmini Varma. His cousin is the novelist and writer Shreekumar Varma.

Revathi Thirunal is next in line to Moolam Thirunal Rama Varma the head of Thrippappur branch The Royal Family of Travancore are custodians of the famous Sree Padmanabhaswamy Temple. He was educated at the Bishop Cotton Boys' School in Bangalore and at UC Berkeley where he completed his MBA in the 1970s before taking on family businesses. He is married to Vidya Varma and has a daughter, Samyuktha, and a son, Vikramaditya.
