= G. V. Raja =

Indian sports official

P. R. Godavarma Raja
- Prince Consort of the Travancore Queen
- Born: 13 October 1908; Poonjar Royal House, Kingdom of Travancore, British India (present day Kottayam, Kerala, India)
- Died: 30 April 1971 (aged 62); Kullu Valley, Himachal Pradesh, India
- Spouse: Maharani Karthika Thirunal Lakshmi Bayi of Travancore (m. 1934)
- Children: Crown Prince Rama Varma (died aged six); Maharaja Moolam Thirunal Rama Varma; Princess Pooyam Thirunal Gowri Parvati Bayi; Princess Aswathi Thirunal Gowri Lakshmi Bayi
- Parents: Narayanan Nampoothiri of Puthusseri Mana; Ambalika Thamburatty of Poonjar Royal House
- Relatives: Maharaja Chithira Thirunal (brother-in-law); Maharaja Uthradom Thirunal (brother-in-law)

Lt. Col. P. R. Godavarma Raja (13 October 1908 – 30 April 1971), often referred to as G. V. Raja, was an Indian sports and tourism promoter and administrator, pilot, sportsman and Sanskrit scholar. He took special care in inspiring the youth into sports and was instrumental in founding the Kerala Sports Council in 1953. G. V. Raja occupied the post of Council President till he was killed in a flight mishap in 1971. G. V. Raja also played a key role in establishing the Trivandrum Tennis Club (now called as Thiruvananthapuram Tennis Club), Flying Club, and the development of the Thiruvananthapuram International Airport. As the spouse of Karthika Thirunal Lakshmi Bayi, he became the prince consort of Travancore.

Raja was the founder President of the Kerala State Sports Council as well as Kerala Cricket Association, and patron of a large number of sports clubs and associations. The CricInfo website reports that Raja was the first Keralite to become the Vice-President of the Board of Control for Cricket in India, and had he lived, he would have become President of the Board of Control for Cricket in India.

Raja was also the President of the Tourism Promotion Council of Kerala. He was the main architect in developing Kovalam as an international tourist spot. He died in an air crash near Kullu Valley on 30 April 1971. Sports journalists, historians, experts and sportsmen consider him the Father of Sports and Tourism in Kerala. Raja's birth anniversary, 13 October, is observed as "Kerala Sports Day".

== Background and early life ==
P. R. Godavarma Raja was born on 13 October 1908 at Poonjar in Kottayam district of Kerala, into the Royal House of Poonjar. He was the third son of Smt. Ambalika Thamburatty, a lady belonging to the Poonjar dynasty, and her husband, Puthusseri Narayanan Nampoothiri.

In accordance with the Sambandam system and the matrilineal Marumakkathayam system then prevalent in Kerala, Godavarma Raja belonged not to the family and caste of his father, but to that of his mother; he was a member of the Poonjar dynasty, and similarly, his children would belong to the family of their mother.

The Poonjar dynasty traces its lineage to the Pandyan kings of the Sangam Age. The founder of the dynasty, Manavikrama Kulashekhara Perumal, was a Pandyan king whose mother was a Chera princess. In 1152 AD, he shifted from Madurai (the Pandya capital) to present-day Kerala due to incessant civil wars in the Tamil Country. Arriving in the land of his mother, Raja Manavikrama Perumal purchased the land that covers present-day Kottayam, Pathanamthitta and Idukki districts from the Thekkumkur Rajas and thus established a small fiefdom for himself. In his flight from Madurai, he and his family had carried with them one of the three idols of Meenakshi, their "Kula Devatha." This idol, which had been used in Madural as the "Utsava Murthy" during the annual car festival of Meenakshi Sundareswara, was now installed by Manavikrama Perumal as the "Pratishtha" (main idol) in the Meenakshi temple which he built on the banks of the Meenachil River. The family has thus lived in Poonjar for nearly a thousand years, and their lives have revolved around this temple and the small fiefdom which surrounds it. The town of Erattupetta was the commercial centre of the Poonjar kingdom.

Raja completed his school education at S.M.V. High School, Poonjar and MD Seminary Higher Secondary School, Kottayam. He then went to Madras to pursue a degree in medicine.

== Marriage ==
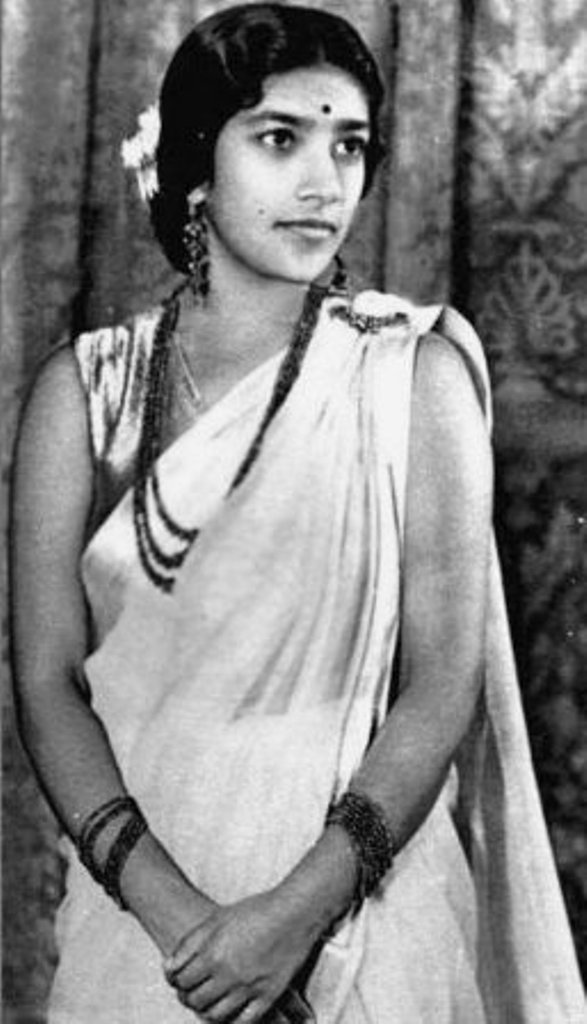
Goda Varma's wife, Rani Karthika Thirunal Lakshmi Bayi, Rani of Attingal and Travancore.

Goda Varma's elder brother, Rama Varma, was married to Bhawani Amma Tampuratti, whose sister Sethu Parvathi Bayi was the Amma Maharani (queen mother) of Travancore. It was Rama Varma and Bhawani Amma who suggested that Goda Varma may be a suitable husband for the queen mother's daughter. The royal family agreed and made a formal proposal of marriage to Goda Varma's parents.

When the marriage proposal from the Travancore Royal Family reached him, as a prospective bridegroom for Karthika Thirunal Lakshmi Bayi, the Queen of Travancore, G. V. Raja was studying in Madras to attain a degree in Medicine. He accepted the marriage proposal, discontinuing his education. On 24 January 1934, at the age of 26, he married the then 17-year-old Maharani Karthika Thirunal Lakshmi Bayi with whom he had four children.

1. Elayarajah (Crown Prince) Avittom Thirunal Rama Varma (1938–1944), died at the age of six of a rheumatic heart condition
2. Pooyam Thirunal Gowri Parvati Bayi (born 1941)
3. Aswathi Thirunal Gowri Lakshmi Bayi (born 1945), Indo Anglian writer,
4. Maharaja Moolam Thirunal Rama Varma Sree Padmanabha Dasa Vanchipala, Maharaja of Travancore (born 1949).

After he settled down to royal duties with his wife in Trivandrum, G. V. Raja started his military career in the Travancore State Force as a Captain of the Nair Brigade. The Maharajah entrusted him with the additional responsibility of receiving and dealing with foreign dignitaries and important state guests. He was also appointed as the head of the sports and tourism departments of the then royal government. He served in the military till 1949 and retired as a Lt. Colonel.

== Contributions ==
G. V. Raja practiced and promoted sports in Kerala. He was involved in sports promotion, tourism, the aviation industry, and establishing the necessary infrastructure for the promotion of all these varied fields.

=== Tourism promotion ===
After their wedding, G. V. Raja and his wife spent their honeymoon at Kovalam. During this time, G. V. Raja had become smitten by the beauty of the place and in later years, even referred to Kovalam as his "first love". Since he had a prominent place in public administration as the Maharani's husband, he decided to develop and promote Kovalam as a tourist destination, and then expanded his interest to other places of tourist interest within Travancore. He started Kerala Travels Limited to popularize various key tourist locations in the Travancore Kingdom. When Travancore merged with India, Kerala Travels Limited became a private (corporate) entity under his ownership. In the 1960s, KTL collaborated with Thomas Cook and started popularizing Kovalam in western countries, and this resulted in kick-starting the hippie culture in Kovalam Beach, something which he never wanted and never thought would happen. He invited many foreign dignitaries and promoted the place by organising parties at the Kovalam Palace, according to the Kerala Tourism Development Corporation website. He also took the initiative to develop the Trivandrum International Airport.

=== Sports promotion ===
The "Kerala for you" web site reports that G. V. Raja established the All India Sports Council in 1954, the first of its kind in the country. He formed the Golf Club Association in Kerala and also introduced Keralites to mountaineering and surfing.

G. V. Raja invited Wimbledon champion Bill Tilden to play an exhibition match on 30 January 1938 to popularise Tennis in the state. Following this, he founded the Trivandrum Tennis Club on 1 February 1938 at Shasthamangalam. G. V. Raja was the president of Kerala Cricket Association from 1950 to 1963. He became the first person from Kerala to become an office-holder for the Board of Control for Cricket in India (BCCI) when he became its Vice President. He was the founder President of the Travancore Sports Council (renamed Kerala Sports Council) that was formed in 1954. The Council was formed as the result of a meeting of 11 sports organisations of Kerala. After the formation of the Kerala state, it became the Kerala State Sports Council. G. V. Raja remained the President of the Council till his death. The list of other organisations that he started includes Trivandrum Golf Club Committee, Veli Boat Club, Roller Skating Ring, SreePaadam Stadium and Trivandrum/Kerala Flying Club (re-named as Rajiv Gandhi Academy for Aviation Technology). He served as the Officer Commandant of the Travancore University Labour Core and was also the first Physical Education Director of the university. In 1953 he conducted the Thiru-Kochi Swimming Competition. He formed the Aquatic Association and was the President of Lawn Tennis Association. He was instrumental in organising the Asian Cup qualifying round tournament involving Israel, Iran, Pakistan and India at the Maharaja’s College Grounds, Ernakulam in 1959 and had spearheaded a team of organisers in hosting the Santosh Trophy for the first time in Kerala in 1956.

== Death ==
In 1971 he went to Patiala, to participate in All India Sports Council Conference. He made an unscheduled trip to the Kulu Valley on 30 April 1971. With two others, G. V. Raja flew in a three-seater aircraft which nose-dived and crashed, killing all its passengers. He was aged 62 at the time of his death. His body was flown to Thiruvananthapuram and cremated at Poonjar.

== Honours ==
- The sports school in Thiruvananthapuram was named G. V. Raja Sports School in his honour.
- A sports stadium in Thiruvananthapuram is named after him.
- Kerala State Sports Council instituted the G. V. Raja award, awarded yearly for excellence in sport.
- The Kerala Tourism Department's award for lifetime achievement in tourism is also named after him.
- Lt. Col. Raja's birth anniversary, 13 October, is observed as "Kerala Sports Day".

== Books ==
- Oru Theerthayathra by Uma Maheshwari
