= Sethu Parvathi Bayi =

Indian music promoter and queen (1896–1983)

Moolam Thirunal Sethu Parvathi Bayi
- Junior Maharani (Elaya Thampuratti) of Attingal & Queen Mother (Amma Maharani) of Travancore
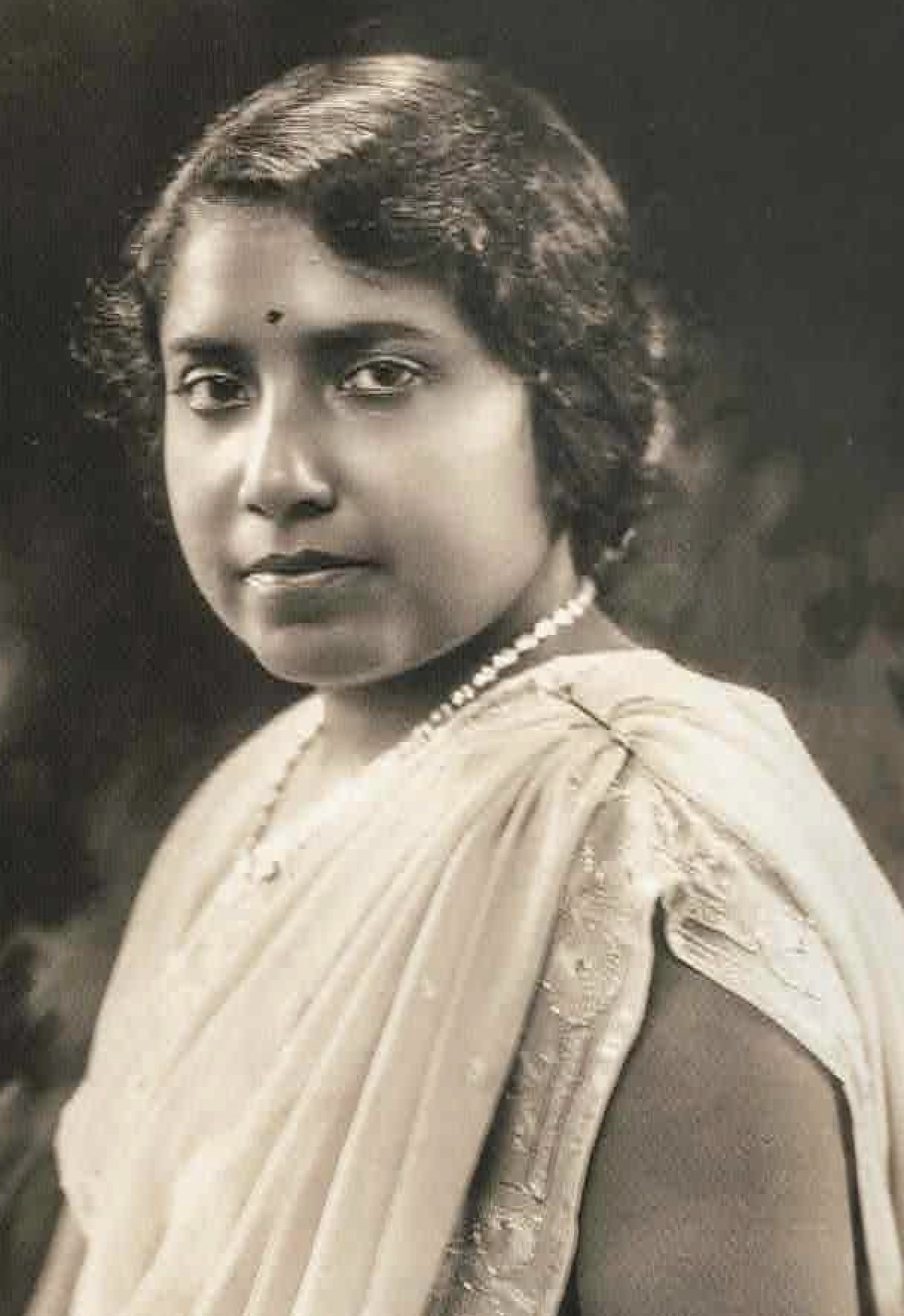
- Rani Sethu Parvathi Bayi of Travancore (Bassano Ltd. 1932)
- Born: 7 November 1896; Mavelikkara, British India
- Died: 4 April 1983 (aged 86); Thiruvananthapuram, Kerala, India
- Spouse: Sri Pooram Nal Ravi Varma Kochu Koyi Thampuran (Valiya Thampuran of Kilimaanoor Palace)
Names
- Sree Padmanabhasevini Maharani Moolam Thirunal Sethu Parvathi Bayi
Regnal name
- Sree Padmanabhasevini Vanchipala Dyumani Raja Rajeshwari Maharani Moolam Thirunal Sethu Parvathi Bayi; Attingal Elaya Thampuran; Junior Maharani Of Travancore
- House: Venad Swaroopam
- Dynasty: Kulasekhara
- Father: Sri Thiruvonam Nal Kerala Varma Thampuran of Paliyakkara Eastern Palace
- Mother: Srimathi Tiruvadira Nal Bhagirathi Bayi Uma Kochukunji Amma Thampurati of Mavelikara Royal House
- Religion: Hinduism
- Occupation: Junior Maharani as well as Queen Mother of Travancore, President of All-India Women's Social Conference Calcutta (1929) and Trivandrum (1937), President and Patron of National Council of Women in India (1940), Vice-Patron Sri Mulam Club (Trivandrum) (1940-1983), Pro-Chancellor University of Travancore (1937-1949), Life Member of Senate of Andhra University

Moolam Thirunal Sethu Parvathi Bayi (1896–1983), better known as Amma Maharani, was the Junior Maharani (Queen) of Travancore as well as a promoter of Indian Classical music. She was the mother of Chithira Thirunal Balarama Varma, the last King of Travancore. She was the president of the National Council of Women in India in 1938–1944.

Sethu Parvathi Bayi was distantly related by birth to the royal house of Travancore in the direct female line. In 1900, following the absence of heirs in the Travancore Royal Family she, along with her elder maternal cousin Sethu Lakshmi Bayi, was adopted by her maternal great-aunt, Senior Maharani Lakshmi Bayi. At the age of five, she became the Junior Maharani of Travancore. Sethu Parvathi Bayi chose Sri Pooram Nal Ravi Varma Thampuran of the Kilimanoor Palace as her consort owing to his high educational achievements. Their wedding took place in 1907. In 1912, after giving birth to the Heir-Apparent Sree Chithira Thirunal at the age of fifteen, she became the Amma (mother) Maharani (queen), or the Queen Mother of Travancore.

Sethu Parvathi Bayi was an accomplished veena (stringed instrument) player, and a famous promoter of Carnatic Music and other arts. She played a major role in bringing to light the compositions of her ancestor Maharajah Swathi Thirunal Rama Varma of Travancore. She and cousin Sethu Lakshmi Bayi, were the grand daughters of Indian artist, Raja Ravi Varma.

== Birth and adoption ==
Sethu Parvathi Bayi was born on 7 November 1896 the daughter of Thiruvathira Nal Bhageerathi Bayi Uma Kochukunji Amma Thampuratty of the Utsavamadom branch of the Mavelikkara Royal House and Sri Thiruvonam Nal Kerala Varma Thampuran of Paliyakkara Eastern Palace. She had four brothers and three sisters. Two of her sisters, Srimathi Avittam Nal Bhawani Amma Thampuratty (artist and illustrator) and Srimathi Makayiram Nal Rajamma Amma Thampuratty (landscape artist under the name Amma Thampuran) were artists. Sethu Parvathi Bayi's grandmother belonged to the Kolathunad royal house in Travancore. Srimathi Makayiram Nal Rajamma Amma Thampuratty's grand daughter, Lekha Varma, was also adopted into the Travancore Royal house in 1996.

Sethu Parvathy Bayi was also the younger grand daughter of the world-renowned artist Sri Raja Ravi Varma of the Kilimanoor Palace. The Mavelikkara royal house was closely associated with the Travancore Royal Family as her great-aunts, the then Senior and Junior Queens of Travancore, had been adopted and installed into the Royal Family of Travancore in 1858. This adoption, which was the sixth in the Travancore Royal House, was without results as the Senior Queen Lakshmi Bayi, who was married to Kerala Varma Valiya Koil Thampuran, was childless while the Junior Queen Parvathi Bayi had only sons. As the Travancore Royal Family follows matrilineal inheritance, the presence of females to continue the line and dynasty is crucial. With the death of the Junior Queen and her sons between 1893 and 1895, the royal family came to consist solely of Maharajah Moolam Thirunal, Senior Queen Lakshmi Bayi, and her two nephews. The Senior Queen decided to adopt the daughters of her nieces, Mahaprabha and Kochukunji of Mavelikara Utsavamadhom Palace, into the Travancore Royal Family.

In 1900, Maharani Lakshmi Bayi petitioned Maharajah Moolam Thirunal for the adoption of her grand nieces, to perpetuate the ruling line. Thus, she became Princess Moolam Thirunal Sethu Parvathi Bayi, the First Princess of Travancore. The adoption itself was met with some opposition from other branches of the Kolathunad family who nominated females from their families. There were also objections from the First Prince Chathayam Thirunal Rama Varma, but these were overcome due to the insistence of the Senior Queen of Travancore. But after a year the Senior Queen Lakshmi Bayi died in 1901 and five-year-old Sethu Parvathi Bayi was elevated to the position of H. H. Sree Padmanbhasevini Maharani Moolam Thirunal Sethu Parvathi Bayi, Junior Maharani of Attingal. Kerala Varma Valiya Koil Thampuran, consort of the late Senior Maharani (Queen) Lakshmi Bayi, was appointed the guardian of the two minor Queens and tutors were appointed to teach them.

== Personal life ==
Sri Ravi Varma Koyi Thampuran - The consort of Moolam Thirunal Sethu Parvathi Bayi

At the age of ten, according to the prevalent tradition, alliances were sought for Sethu Parvathi Bayi's marriage. A select group of young men of high accomplishments were presented to her. She chose the twenty-one-year-old graduate, and Sanskrit scholar, Sri Pooram Nal Ravi Varma Thampuran of the Kilimanoor royal house, after being impressed by his erudition and his high level of education (college graduates were a rarity in those days). Their wedding took place in 1907; when she turned fourteen in 1911, their marriage was consummated. In 1912, on her sixteenth birthday, she gave birth to her eldest son, the then Crown Prince, Sree Chithira Thirunal Balarama Varma, the last ruling Maharajah (King) of Travancore. Thus she became the Queen Mother at the age of fifteen. Sethu Parvathi Bayi gave birth to three more children. Her second child, a baby girl, was stillborn. Her other children were Karthika Thirunal Lakshmi Bayi and Uthradom Thirunal Marthanda Varma.

== Contributions ==
Sethu Parvathi Bayi was very interested in Carnatic Music and started learning music and the veena at a young age. According to musicologists and researchers, she made memorable contributions to Carnatic Music by organizing different music festivals, revamping Swathi Thirunal compositions, and promoting musicians like Semmangudi Srinivasa Iyer, and Muthiah Bhagavathar among others. She also made great efforts to bring compositions by Maharajah Swathi Thirunal back into prominence. She gave the task of revamping Swathi compositions to Muthiah Bhagavathar and Semmangudi Srinivasa Iyer assisted him with this task. Sethu Parvathi Bayi's eldest son, the then Maharajah of Travancore, Sree Chithira Thirunal Balarama Varma, established the Swathi Thirunal College of Music in 1939, and Muthiah Bhagavathar became its first principal. The task was continued by legendary musician, Sri Semmangudi Srinivasa Iyer. It was due to Sethu Parvathi Bayi's efforts that the Navarathri Music Festival became a huge event after the 1930s. Previously only Mullamudu Bhagavathars were allowed to sing at the festival. She invited the likes of Muthiah Bhagavathar, Semmangudi Srinivasa Iyer, M. D. Ramanathan and others to sing there.

T. Lakshmana Pillai in his treatise Music And The Royal House Of Travancore says the following about Sethu Parvathi Bayi :

I cannot close this brief narrative about " Music and the Royal House", without making specific mention of Her Highness the present Junior Maharani whose knowledge of the theory and practice of music is simply astonishing. No one who has had the good fortune of listening to her conversation about music can fail to be struck with Her Highness high, keen and refined intelligence, her profundity of knowledge and the vast fund of her information on the subject of music. As a player on the Veena, Her Highness takes rank with the best artists in the field.

== Allegations and controversies ==
According to Lakshmi Raghunandan's book on her grandmother Sethu Lakshmi Bayi, the birth of her eldest son, Sree Chithira Thirunal, changed Sethu Parvathi Bayi's position within the royal family as well as in Travancore as she became the Amma Maharani (Queen Mother) of Travancore at the age of fifteen. Raghunandan alleged that the constant hateful comments made by Kochukunji Thampuratty (Sethu Parvathi Bayi's mother) to her daughter led to the estrangement between the former and her elder cousin, Sethu Lakshmi Bayi. Raghunandan also alleges that Sethu Parvathi Bayi resented the fact that, Sethu Lakshmi Bayi and not herself, was chosen as the Regent for her minor son, Sree Chithira Thirunal who became the King (Maharajah) after the death of Sree Moolam Thirunal in 1924. Rama Varma Valiya Koyi Thampuran, the consort of Regent Sethu Lakshmi Bayi, prevented his wife from handing over the control of the financial allowance of the then Sree Chithira Thirunal to his mother Sethu Parvathi Bayi. There were also rumours of an assassination attempt on the young Maharajah Chithira Thirunal, allegedly at the behest of Rama Varma Valiya Koyi Thampuran, the consort of Sethu Lakshmi Bayi. All of these incidents further fanned the enmity between the two Queens. The heirs of Sethu Parvathi Bayi, and her other descendants have never commented on the allegations by Sethu Lakshmi Bayi's family, so their side of events remains unknown.

Sethu Parvathi Bayi is known to have visited the Sabarimala temple, which is known for refusing entry to women of menstruating age. Decades after her death, the Kowdiar palace clarified that she entered the temple after the forbidden age, at 53 years. However, her recorded entry to the temple was at 1940, when she would have been only 44 years of age.
