= Uma Rama Rao =

Indian dancer and choreographer (1938–2016)

K. Uma Rama Rao
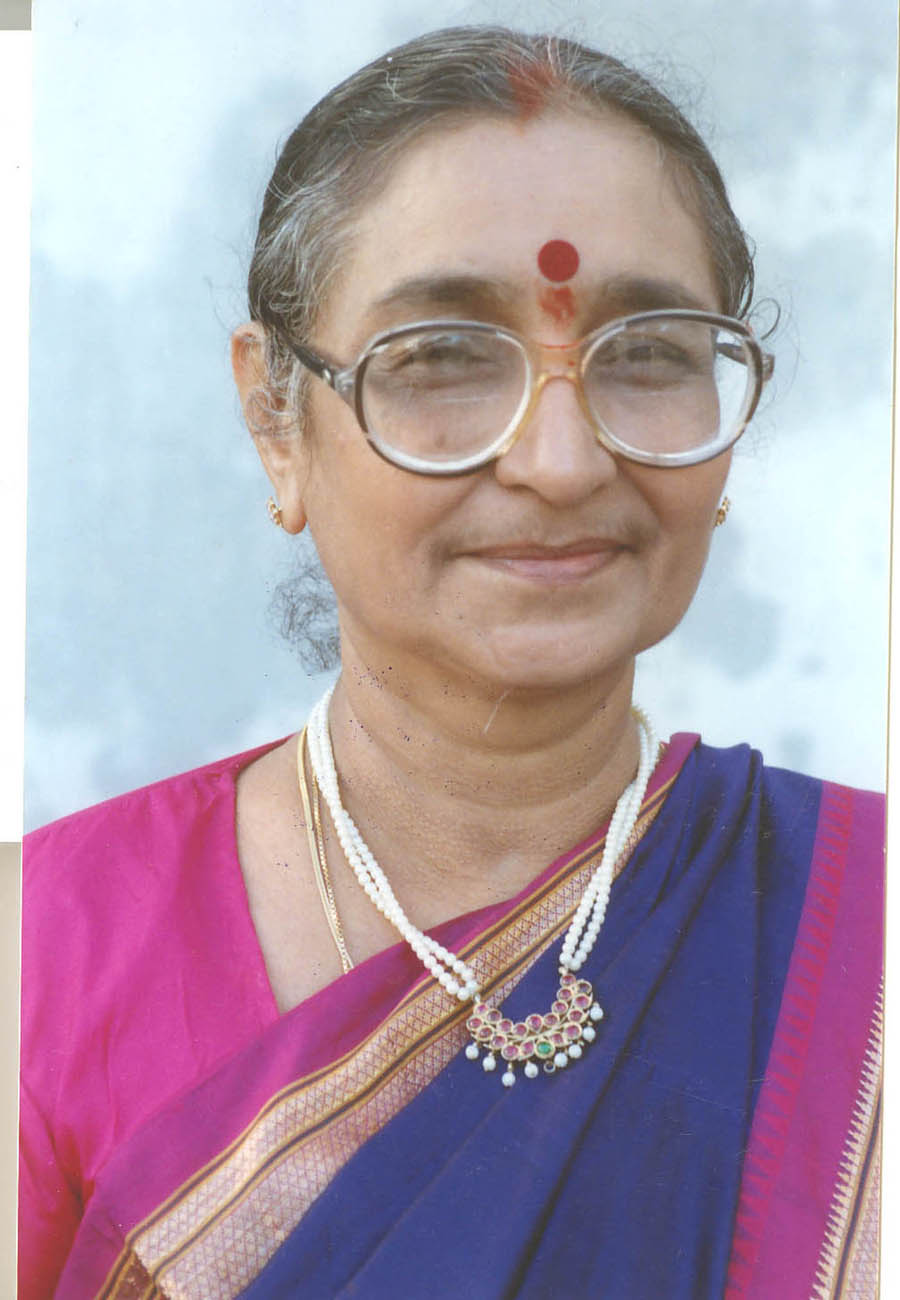
- Uma Rama Rao in 2004
- Born: Uma Maheswari; 4 July 1938; Visakhapatnam, Andhra Pradesh, India
- Died: 27 August 2016 (aged 78); Hyderabad, Telangana, India
- Occupations: Kuchipudi dancer, choreographer, academician, research scholar, author, teacher
- Known for: Contributions to Kuchipudi and Bharatanatyam
- Awards: Sangeet Natak Akademi Award (2003) Kala Neerajanam Sri Kala Poorna Pratibha Puraskar

K. Uma Rama Rao (born Uma Maheswari; 4 July 1938 – 27 August 2016) was an Indian Kuchipudi dancer, choreographer, academician, research scholar, author, and teacher. She was a prominent figure in the field of Indian classical dance, known for her lifelong dedication to Kuchipudi and Bharatanatyam. She founded the Lasya Priya Dance Academy in Hyderabad in 1985, which became a significant institution for training dancers in classical dance forms. In 2003, she was honored with the Sangeet Natak Akademi Award for her contributions to Kuchipudi by India's National Academy for Music, Dance and Drama.

== Early life and education ==
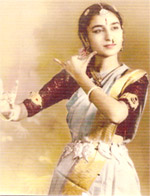
Uma Rama Rao in her early career

K. Uma Rama Rao was born on 4 July 1938 in Visakhapatnam, Andhra Pradesh, to Dr. V. V. Krishna Rao and Sowbhagyam. She was raised in a conservative family that initially did not support her pursuit of dance as a career. However, her marriage to K. Rama Rao, a lawyer, provided her with the encouragement and support to follow her passion for dance. She credited him for standing by her throughout her career. She began her dance training at the age of five, initially learning Bharatanatyam under Guru Prahlada Sarma, and later mastering Kuchipudi under the guidance of renowned gurus like Vedantam Prahlada Sarma and C.R. Acharyulu. She also pursued formal education, earning a postgraduate degree in economics from Osmania University, Hyderabad.

== Career ==
K. Uma Rama Rao began her career as a performer in her early years, gaining recognition for her expressive and technically proficient performances in Kuchipudi and Bharatanatyam. She performed extensively across India and internationally, earning acclaim for her ability to convey deep emotions through her dance. Her performances were noted for their authenticity and adherence to the traditional aspects of Kuchipudi, while also incorporating innovative choreography. In addition to her work as a performer, Uma Rama Rao was a dedicated educator. She served as a senior lecturer in dance at Sri Tyagaraja Government College of Music and Dance in Hyderabad from 1969 to 1988, where she taught Bharatanatyam. She later became an associate professor at Potti Sreeramulu Telugu University, Hyderabad, where she continued to impart her knowledge of classical dance. In 1994, she earned a PhD from Telugu University, receiving a gold medal for her thesis on the 'Yakshagana Prabandhas of King Shahaji II,' a Maharashtrian ruler of Thanjavur (1684–1712) who composed 20 Yakshagana dance dramas in the Telugu language.

=== Lasya Priya Dance Academy ===
In 1985, Uma Rama Rao established the Lasya Priya Dance Academy in Hyderabad, an institution dedicated to teaching the theory and practice of Kuchipudi and Bharatanatyam in both theory and practice. The academy became a significant center for classical dance training, affiliated with the Indira Gandhi National Open University (IGNOU) as a study center. Through Lasya Priya, she trained numerous students, many of whom went on to become accomplished dancers, preserving the traditional essence of Kuchipudi while adapting it for contemporary audiences.

== Awards and Recognition ==
K. Uma Rama Rao received several prestigious awards for her contributions to Indian classical dance. In 2003, she was honored with the Sangeet Natak Akademi Award for her excellence in Kuchipudi, recognizing her as a leading exponent of the dance form. She was also awarded a National Senior Fellowship from the Department of Culture, Government of India, through the Sangeet Natak Akademi, to support her research in dance. Other notable honors include the Kala Neerajanam, Sri Kala Poorna, and Pratibha Puraskar awards, which acknowledged her contributions as a performer, teacher, and scholar.

== Works ==
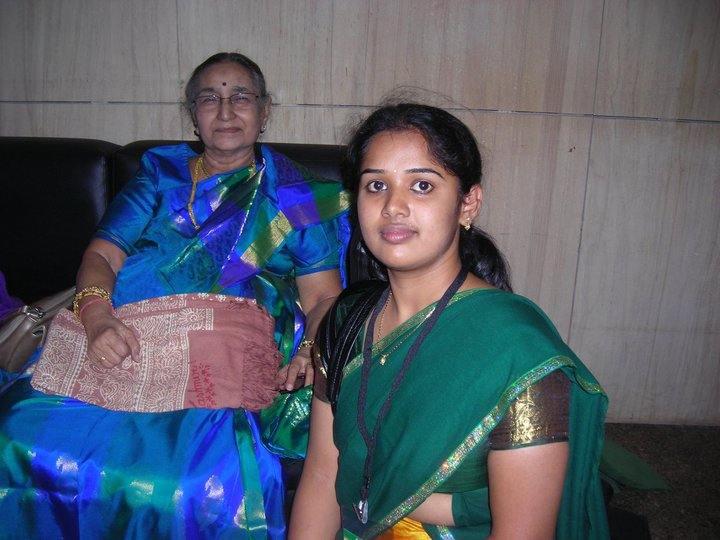
Uma Rama Rao in 2010

Uma Rama Rao authored a significant book on Kuchipudi, documenting its history and techniques. Her work has been a valuable resource for scholars and practitioners of Indian classical dance.

- Rao, K. Uma Rama (1992). Kuchipudi Bharatam Or Kuchipudi Dance: South Indian Classical Dance Tradition. Delhi: Sri Satguru Publications. ISBN 81-7030-291-9.

== Personal life ==
Uma Rama Rao was married to K. Rama Rao, a lawyer who supported her career in dance despite initial resistance from her family. She died on 27 August 2016 in Hyderabad, leaving behind a legacy in the world of Indian classical dance. Her death was widely mourned, with many noting the void left by her departure in the dance community.

== Legacy ==
K. Uma Rama Rao’s contributions to Kuchipudi and Bharatanatyam have had a lasting impact on Indian classical dance. Through her performances, teaching, and research, she played a key role in preserving and promoting these traditional art forms. Her establishment of the Lasya Priya Dance Academy ensured that future generations of dancers could learn and appreciate Kuchipudi and Bharatanatyam. Her scholarly work, including her book on Kuchipudi and her research on Yakshagana, remains a valuable resource for those studying Indian dance traditions.
