= Poonjar dynasty =

Royal dynasty in medieval Kerala

Kingdom of Poonjar
- 1160–1750
- Status: Kingdom of medieval Kerala
- Capital: Poonjar
- Common languages: Malayalam,Tamil
- Religion: Hinduism
- Raja
  - 12th century: Manavikrama Kulasekara Perumal
- Historical era: Kollam Era
  - Established: 1160
  - Disestablished: 1750
- Today part of: Kottayam district Idukki district Theni district

Poonjar dynasty (Tamil: பூஞ்ஞார் ராஜவம்சம்/ அரசகுலம்) was one of the royal dynasties in medieval Kerala descended from the Pandya kings of Madurai. History has it that Manavikrama Kulasekara Perumal, a Pandya king as the sole founder of the dynasty. It was a minor principality in the central Travancore region which covered the parts of present-day Dindigul, Cumbum, Kudallor, Bodinayakkanur, Vandiperiyar, Peerumedu and Kannan Devan Hills.

== Manavikrama Kulasekara Perumal ==
In 1157 CE, Kulothunga Chola, a famed Chola king entered in a battle with Manavikrama Kulasekara Perumal, who was a Pandya king. Kulothunga's first attempt to defeat him was unsuccessful but his next attempt was a success which resulted in the failure of Manavikrama. Upon the failure, Manavikrama appointed his brother Maravarman Sreebhallava as the raja of Pandya kingdom and left Madurai with his family and some trusted servants. Later, he settled in Gudalloor region with his family and administered from there. When he learned of the availability of land at cheap rates in Kerala, he shifted to Thekkumkoor via Kumily, Periyar, Kolahalamedu and Vagamon. He also carried out the idols of Madhura Meenakshi, their kuladevatha (tutelary deity) and Sundareswarar (Shiva) which was used in the chariot festival in Madurai Meenakshi temple. These idols were later installed in the Poonjar Meenakshi temple on the banks of Meenachil River.

== Owning Poonjar ==
Upon the journey to Thekkumkur, Manavikrama and his troops were unexpectedly attacked by some robbers near Vandiperiyar. But a mahout with an elephant suddenly appeared and defeated those thieves within no time. He gave a stick and the elephant to the king and warned him to leave the place. After the strange incidents at Vandiperiyar, Manavikrama reached Ettumanoor temple and stayed there. At night, some robbers tried to plunder the temple assets which was bravely resisted by the raja and his servants. Before shifting to Poonjar, Manavikrama and his family initially settled in Kanjirappally and built a shrine for goddess Meenakshi there. After procuring lands from the Thekkumkoor rajas, Manavikrama and his family moved to the palace in Poonjar where the Koyikkal rulers ruled. He was well aware about the incidents at Vandiperiyar and believed that Lord Ayyappa himself came to his rescue in the form of a mahout. In returns, a separate idol of Ayyappa was installed in the Poonjar Dharma Sastha temple. Another temple for Ayyappa was constructed at Vandiperiyar where the raja was rescued by a mahout (believed to be Lord Ayyappa) from an unexpected attack of thieves.

== Expansion of Poonjar kingdom ==
After acquiring Poonjar from Thekkumkoor rajas, Manavikrama procured Elamala region of Chengamanadu Devaswom in M.E 364 and the Kannanthevannoor region from Keezhmalainadu Kothavarmman Kovilathikarikal in M.E 427. The Cumbum, Koodallur, Uthamapalayam, Dindigul and Bodinayakkanur regions in Tamilakam were also the parts of Poonjar kingdom. As Edappally raja married the daughter of Manavikrama, regions including Kochi also came under the possession of Poonjar. Manjamala and Periyar regions were procured in M.E. 594. Poonjar kingdom expanded its extend which reached up to the Palani hills in present Tamil Nadu. By 1425 CE, the area of Poonjar kingdom was about 4,000 km^{2} (1,500 sq mi).

== Decline ==
After 1625 CE, there were no inheritors in Ponnjar royal family. Hence the members of Sarkara kovilakom in Ponnani taluk were adopted. Later, a raja of this dynasty married a princess of Vadakkukkoor palace. During the Digvijaya of Marthandavarma, Poonjar sided with Venad against Vadakkumkoor. The battle resulted in the merging of Vadakkumkoor in Venad. The kingdom of Poonjar couldn't resist the attacks of Hyderali in M.E 932 and in order to sustain their kingdom, Poonjar had to pay 75,000 gold coins and 7 elephants to the Mysore sultan. Cumbum, Koodallur regions were conquered under Hyderali's attacks in M.E 934. Dharmaraja with a sympathy towards Poonjar provided 5,000 Nair soldiers to recapture the areas obtained by Hyderali but it wasn't a fruitful task. As per the instructions of Dhiwan Keshavapilla, force of Poonjar attacked Cumbum and Koodallur regions in which they attained victory and helped them to recapture these regions. After the demise of Tippu Sultan, English East India Company raised their voice for the ownership of Kannandevan hills and many Pandya nadus. Upon acquiring the ownership rights of these regions, Anjanadu and Kannandevan hills were given to Poonjar kingdom. When time passed, many regions under Poonjar were given in lease to Travancore including Anjunadu, Elamala and Periyar regions. The vast Poonjar kingdom finally shrunk to just 87 km^{2}.

== Prominent Members ==
The royal family has many prominent members. Most notable among them is Col. G.V. Raja who is considered as the most eminent promoter of sports in Kerala and the first person to identify the potential of developing the state into a hub of tourism.

Recently a statue was unveiled of his older brother PR Rama Varma Raja a prolific personality who during his lifetime was based from Alakode, Kerala.

Another important person was the late P Kerala Varma, a change-maker, social activist, and tantrik scholar. He stood for elections multiple times the notable one being against the late chief minister K. Karunakaran in 1998.

Gopa Varma, another member of the royal family has been a pioneer in promoting adventure sports and sustainable tourism in Kerala. He has been pivotal in the promotion of paragliding as a popular sport in Kerala.

== Poonjar palace ==
The Poonjar palace, about 600 years old (built around AD 1400) is built in the traditional architectural styles of ancient Chera and Pandya Kingdoms is a privileged historic destination. Wood being the most used construction component due to the availability of forest woods in the eastern side of Kottayam and Idukki districts. Other components used were granite stone blocks, laterite tiles and clay tiles of larger and medium sizes. The ancient architectural styles of Kerala can be seen anywhere here. The temple like structure gives the palace itself a holy look. The floors and interior parts are quite unique in their design and outlook. There is also a temple inside the palace built according to the Vastu shastra laws. Marvelous statutes of various Hindu deities are placed in various parts of palace. The furniture made of teak, sandal wood and rose wood. These uniqueness of Poonjar palace attracts many visitors. A museum is also housed inside the palace which preserves many rock cut lamps, sculptures and antiques. The Kerala state department of archaeology keeps the palace as a heritage site and a historic monument.

== Temples under Poonjar dynasty ==
- Sree Dharma Sastha Temple Poonjar
- Madhurameenakshi Temple Poonjar
- Nayattupara Ganapathi Temple Poonjar
- Kottaram Sree Krishna Swami Temple Poonjar
- Nadackal Bhagavathi Temple
- Sree Saraswathi Devi Temple, Mankompu
- Sree Dharma Sastha Temple Vandiperiyar

=== Attractions at the palace ===
Poonjar palace preserves a unique collection of various materials which remain in good condition.

- Droni, a bed used in the traditional Ayurvedic treatment
- Precious jewel boxes and lamps
- Sculptures of Nataraja (the dancing Shiva)
- Palm-leaf engravings
- Rock-cut lamps and Chuttuvilakku carved out of the stone walls
- A unique conch shell brought out once in a year for ritual practices
- Weapons used by rajas
- Palanquins and chandeliers

== See also ==
- Chera dynasty
- Pandya dynasty
- Chola dynasty
- G. V. Raja
- Pandalam dynasty
- Kulothunga I
