= Visakham Thirunal =

Maharaja of Travancore from 1880 to 1885

Visakham Thirunal Rama Varma
- Maharaja of Travancore
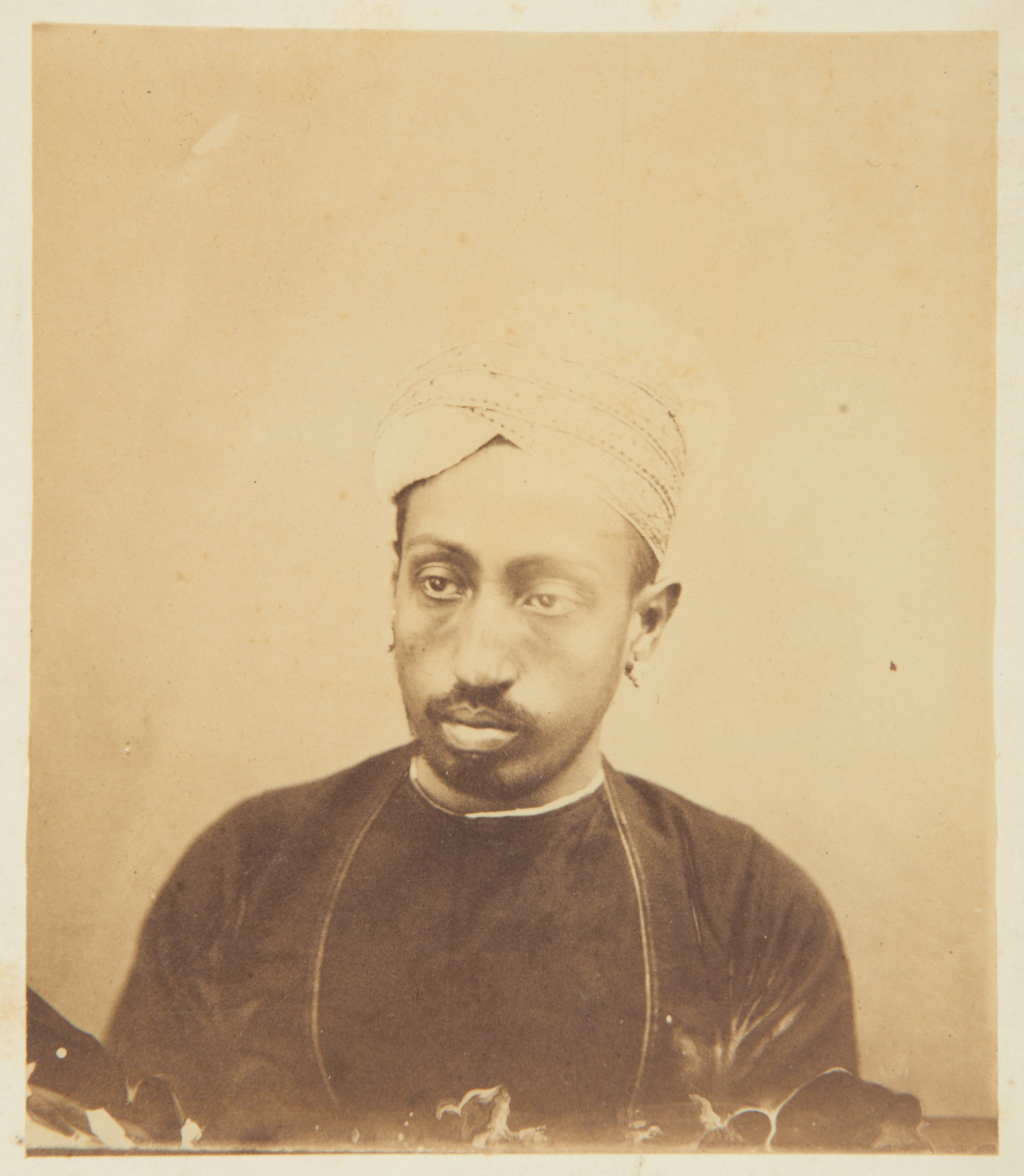
- The Maharaja in 1868
- Reign: 30 May 1880 – 4 August 1885
- Predecessor: Ayilyam Thirunal
- Successor: Moolam Thirunal
- Born: 19 May 1837
- Died: 4 August 1885 (aged 48)
- Consort: Arumana Ammachi Panapillai Amma Srimathi Lakshmi Pillai Kochamma
- Issue: Madhavan Thampi Mahalekshmi Madhavan Thampi Priya Madhavan Thampi Narayanan Thampi Bhageerathi Pillai Rukmini Pillai Bhagavathi Pillai
- House: Venad Swaroopam
- Dynasty: Kulasekhara
- Father: Punartham Thirunal Rama Varma Koil Thampuran
- Mother: Gowri Rukmini Bayi
- Religion: Hinduism

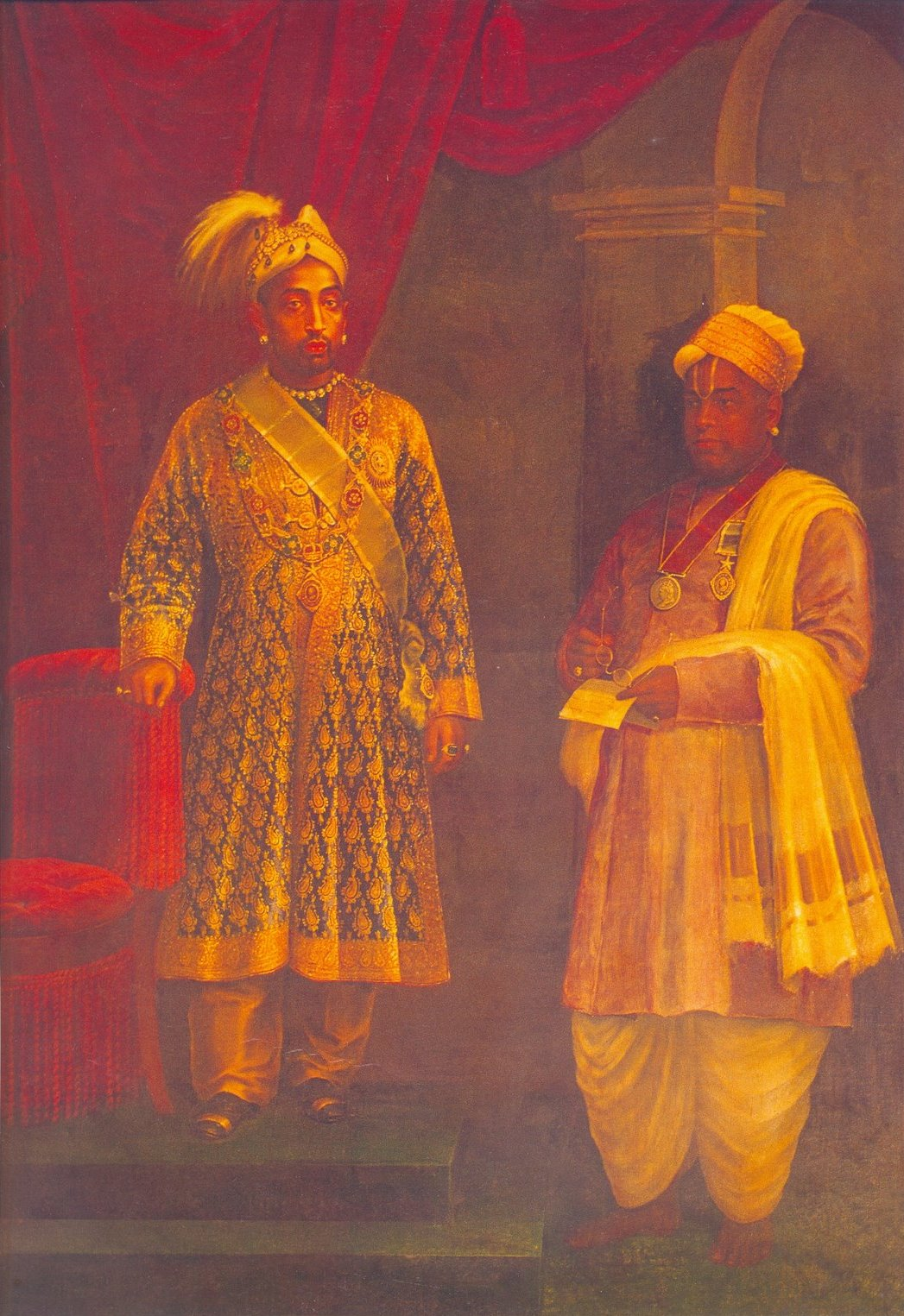
The Maharaja with his Dewan

Sri Padmanabha Dasa Sir Sri Visakham Thirunal Rama Varma V GCSI FRGS FRAS (19 May 1837 – 4 August 1885), also known as Rama Varma the Learned, was the Maharaja of Travancore from 1880 to 1885 AD, succeeding his elder brother Ayilyam Thirunal on the musnud, or throne. He was a noted scholar of Sanskrit and literary composer in Malayalam, who reversed his brother's policy, liberally patronizing poet Kerala Varma, while hostile to painter Raja Ravi Varma.

== Early life ==
Vishakham Thirunal Rama varma was born on 19 May 1837 to Rani Gowri Rukmini Bayi and her husband Punartham Thirunal Rama Varma Koil Thampuran of the royal family of Thiruvalla. His mother died when he was barely two months of age leaving him and his elder siblings to the care of their father. His Highness was grandson to Maharani Gowri Lakshmi Bayi and nephew of Maharajah Swathi Thirunal.

As a prince he received his early education from his father, Rama Varma. This was basic training in vernacular Malayalam language and Sanskrit which were essentials for members of the royal family. At the age of nine he started his English education under Subba Row, who later became Dewan of Travancore. The prince took a keen interest in English composition and his first work, Horrors of war and benefits of peace, was well acknowledged. Some of his compositions were also published in "Madras Athenaeum". He also wrote in The Statesman and the Calcutta Review.

In 1861 the prince visited Madras and met with the Governor, Sir William Denison, upon whom he made such a favourable impression that the Governor remarked that "He is by far the most intelligent Native I have seen; and if his brother is like him, the prospects of Travancore are very favorable." The prince was soon appointed a Governor of the University of Madras, a rare honour to be conferred on a native Indian in those days. While he was still a prince he was also offered a seat in the Viceroy of India's Legislative Council which he, however, declined owing to ill health. He had a special aptitude for botany and agriculture. This paved the way for introduction of tapioca and rubber cultivation in Travancore.

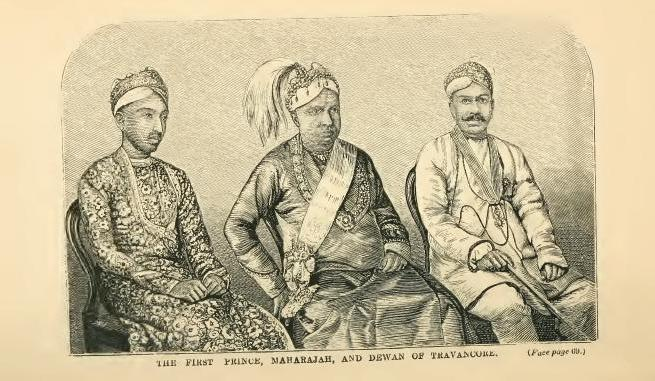
Visakham Thirunal as First Prince with his brother Ayilyam Thirunal and the Dewan Rajah Sir T. Madhava Rao

He was an erudite scholar and had in his court learned Brahmins, known as Tharka Sastry and used to take their advice in settling cases that were referred to him. There is a story about his asking a question on the Mahabharata and only two in the group of Tharka Sastrys answered. One was Gopala Iyer and according to his request his son, K G Sesha Iyer, was made a Munsiff who later became a famous Judge. The other was Gopala Sastry at whose request the Maharajah took up with the British resident to get the son of Gopala Sastry appointed the Sub-Registrar at Tiruchendur.

Both Gopala Iyer (Kadayam) and Gopala Sastry (Mela Cheval) were Vadadesa Vadama Brahmins from Tirunelveli.

== Chief compositions ==
- The Horrors of War and Benefits of Peace
- A Political Sketch of Travancore, Madras Athenaeum
- Lectures on "Human Greatness", "The relation between nature and art", "Our Morals" and "Our Industrial Status" etc.
- A Native Statesman, Calcutta Review
- Observations on Higher Education

== Accession ==
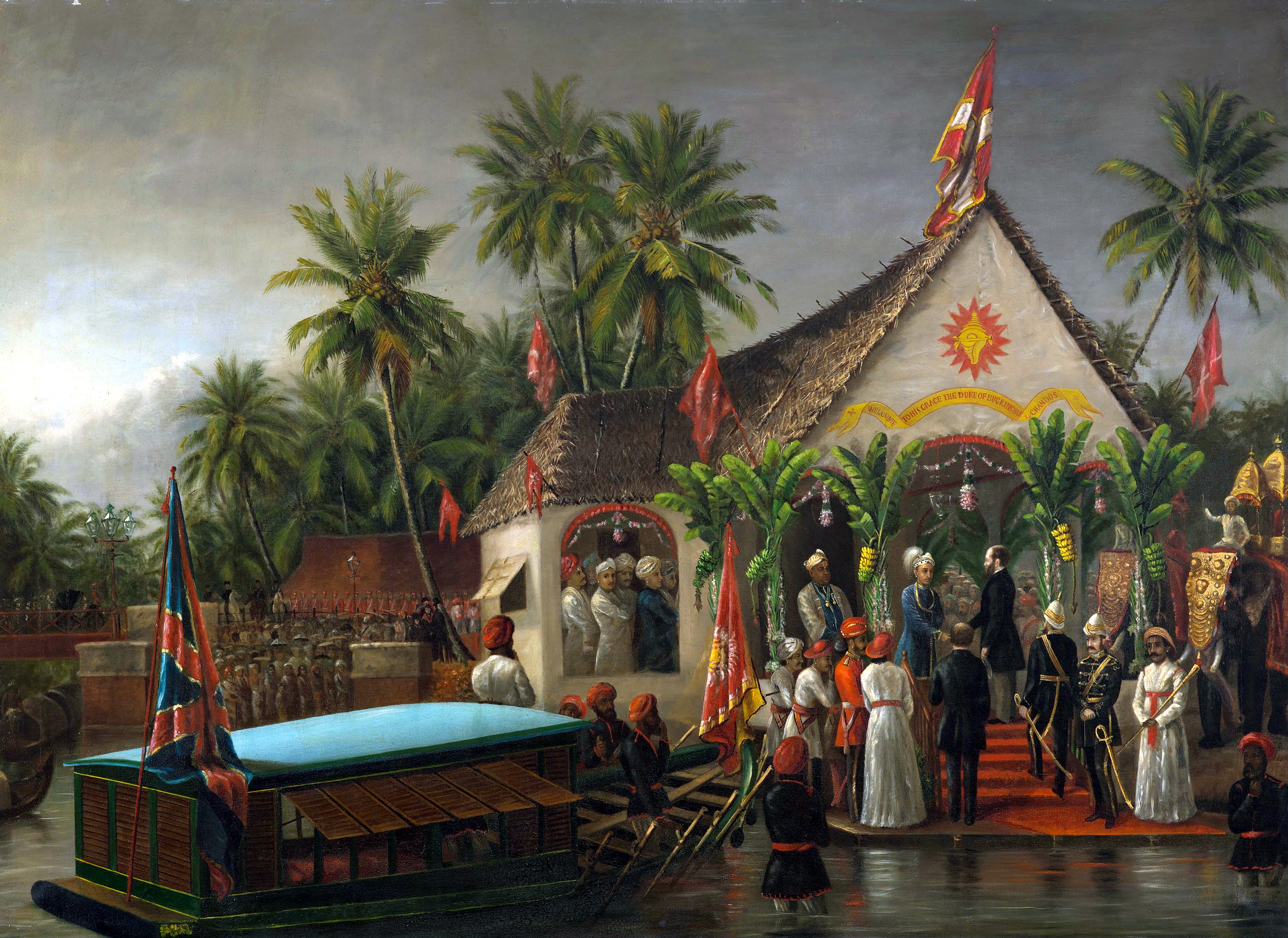
Painting by Raja Ravi Varma depicting Richard Temple-Grenville, 3rd Duke of Buckingham and Chandos being greeted by Visakham Thirunal, with Ayilyam Thirunal of Travancore looking on, during Buckingham's visit to Trivandrum, Travancore in early 1880.

The Maharajah's elder brother, Ayilyam Thirunal, died after ruling Travancore for twenty years from 1860 to 1880. As per the Marumakkathayam law, Prince Visakham Thirunal Rama Varma succeeded to the Travancore throne in 1880. He introduced a number of reforms including changes in the education system, police department, justice and judiciary etc. He furthered the cultivation of Tapioca which became so popular and commonly available that it came to be known as the poor man's meal in Travancore.

== Agricultural contributions ==
The Maharajah was instrumental in development of tapioca cultivation and rubber cultivation in Travancore. His highness was a keen botanist and he got to know about the tapioca/cassava from Lord Napier, Governor of Madras and Colonel Olcott of Theosophical Society Adyar. On realizing the potential of this newfound crop he introduced cultivation of the same within premises of palace at present day Jawahar Nagar near Kowdiar on 31 July 1883. His highness took keen interest in promotion of tapioca and he even issued proclamation detailing his subjects about how to cook tapioca. The cultivation of newfound crop spread across the country and it received boost from administrators like CP Ramaswami Iyer. Later during World War II when the fall of Burma stressed rice imports, the tapioca cultivation helped Travancore survive a massive famine.

The Maharajah's interest in botany helped him get two rubber saplings from a planter in 1876, who brought 28 saplings from Ceylon to Nilambur in then Madras Presidency. One sapling from this was planted in the premise of Napier Museum at Thiruvananthapuram which was opened by Uthram Thirunal Marthanda Varma in 1857. This century old rubber tree is still present in the museum premise. In the year 1902, after the demise of his highness what which the Maharajah pioneered, paved way for establishment of first commercial rubber plantation at Thattekad by an Irish planter named JJ Murphy along with three other planters through setting up of Periyar Syndicate.

== Family and demise ==
The Maharajah fell ill towards the end of July in 1885 at the age of 48 and died on 4 August 1885. His Highness was married in 1859 to a noblewomen of the Arumana Ammaveedu of Trivandrum with which family more than one of his ancestors had been related through marriage, Arumana Ammachi Panapillai Amma Srimathi Lakshmi Pillai Kochamma (educated privately and in English by the Church of England Zenana Mission in Trivandrum since 1865. Within the royalty and nobility of Trivandrum, she was the first lady to commence English Education), descendant of Maharajah Balarama Varma and Dharma Raja. The Maharajah chose his own consort, causing displeasure to his uncle and the then Maharajah, Uthram Thirunal. From this marriage the Maharajah had issue four children. His eldest and only son, Sri Narayanan Thampi, who started the first bus services in Travancore (Trivandrum-Nagercoil route), was born in 1865.

He married a daughter of Irayimman Thampi who was also of royal descent. In 1873 the Maharajah and his wife had their eldest daughter Bhagavati Pillai Kochamma who married Sri Rajaraja Varma Avargal of the Mavelikara royal family. Their next daughter was born in 1876, Rukmini Pillai Kochamma who married Sri Kerala Varma Thirumulpad. The Maharajah's youngest daughter, Bhageerathi Pillai Kochamma was born in 1877 and was married to Sri Rama Varma of the royal family of Poonjar. The Thali Kettu Kalyanam of the Maharajah's daughters was conducted on 18 May 1883 in a grand public ceremony with the above-mentioned husbands, as recorded by the French Ambassador in the Travancore Court.

== Successors ==
Under the Marumakkathayam law of matriarchy the Maharajah was succeeded not by his own children but by those of his sisters. The Maharajah had only one sister and was succeeded by her younger son, Maharajah Moolam Thirunal Sir Rama Varma GCSI, GCIE. This King reigned from 1885 until his demise in 1924. His nephew, Chithira Thirunal Balarama Varma, was the last independent Maharajah of Travancore before ceding his Kingdom to India in 1949.

== Official full name ==
Officially he was also known with his full title: His Highness Sri Padmanabha Dasa Vanchi Pala Visakham Thirunal Rama Varma Kulasekhara Kiritapathi Manney Sultan Maharajah Raja Ramaraja Bahadur Shamsher Jang

== See also ==
- Ayilyam Thirunal
- Moolam Thirunal
- Travancore
- Kerala
- British India
- Thampi
- Panapillai Amma

Visakham Thirunal Kulasekhara dynasty Born: 19 May 1837 Died: 4 August 1885
Regnal titles
Preceded by Ayilyam Thirunal	Maharaja of Travancore; 1880–1885	Succeeded by Moolam Thirunal
