= Ammaveedu =

Ammaveedus were the residences of the consorts of the Maharajahs (kings) of the erstwhile Travancore in the current day Kerala. The descendants of the Maharajahs were considered as members of these Ammaveedus, with a status subordinate only to royalty. The chief four Ammaveedus are the Arumana, Vadasseri, Thiruvattar and Nagercoil Ammaveedus.

== Origin ==
The wives of the Travancore kings were known as Ammachis, and held the title of Panapillai Amma (royal consort). As per the Marumakkathayam law of inheritance and succession in the royal family of Travancore, the Maharajahs were succeeded by the sons of their sisters, the Maharanis. An Ammachi Panapillai Amma was granted privileges befitting her status, vast areas of lands and other valuable property and a liberal provision made from the State funds for her maintenance in comfort and dignity. The Ammachi was not a member of the royal household, and was in no way associated with the royal court and could not, earlier, even be seen in public with the ruler whose wife she was. Ammachis, if put away or widowed, were not allowed to marry any other man and were restricted and guarded in their own residences. The male and female children born to the Maharajah were dignified with the honorifics of Thampi and Kochamma/Thankachi respectively.

== Etymology ==
The Maharajah's spouse was known as the Ammachi Panapillai Amma, and her "veedu" or residence was known as an Ammaveedu. The names of the Ammaveedus corresponded to the place from where the consort hailed. For example, the Arumana Ammaveedu had its origin when a lady from Arumana village in Vilavancode, Kanyakumari was espoused by a former Maharajah of Travancore. Other Ammaveedus of prominence were Vadasseri Ammaveedu, Nagercoil Ammaveedu, Thanjavur Ammaveedu, Thiruvattar Ammaveedu, Puthumana Ammaveedu (of Irayimman Thampi) etc., all named after the villages from where the original Ammachis came.

== The Ammaveedus ==
There are several Ammaveedus in Trivandrum such as the Puthumana, Kallada, Mupidakka, Chavara, Pulimoodu Ammaveedus' etc. However, from the end of the 18th century four Ammaveedus gained prominence. These were the Arumana, Vadasseri, Thiruvattar and Nagercoil Ammaveedus. Maharajah Karthika Thirunal Dharma Raja had married four ladies from the above-mentioned villages and established these Ammaveedus. Thereafter he decreed that henceforward the Maharajahs and male members of the Travancore royal family were to take consorts only from these four families and if an outsider was to be taken, she would have to be adopted into one of these. Balarama Varma, his successor, married from the Arumana family as did Visakham Thirunal in 1859. Swathi Thirunal and Uthram Thirunal married sisters who were adopted into the Thiruvattar family. Ayilyam Thirunal's consort was similarly adopted into the Nagercoil family. Moolam Thirunal married from Nagercoil first and following his consort's death married a commoner by adopting her into the Vadasseri Ammaveedu.

Only those consorts of the Maharajahs who were born or adopted into one of these four Ammaveedus was entitled to the royal dignities and privileges that came with the title of Panapillai Amma. As late as the early 20th century when the then heir apparent, Prince Chatayam Thirunal, married a lady from outside these four families, she was not permitted to adopt the above-mentioned title and separate provisions had to be made later on the Prince's application from the state treasury.

== See also ==
- Nair
- Thampi
- Panapillai Amma
- Travancore
- Marumakkathayam
