= Kutty Kunju Thankachi =

Indian composer and writer of Malayalam literature (1820-1904)

kutti kunju Thankachi
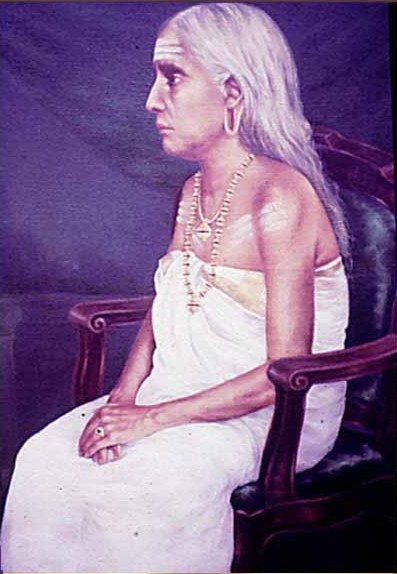
- Born: Lakshmy Pilla; 14 February 1820; Vilavancode taluk, Travancore, India
- Died: 13 February 1904 (aged 83); Travancore
- Occupations: Poet, playwright, composer
- Spouse(s): Kunjan Thamban, Kunjunni Thamban
- Children: Eight children
- Parents: Irayimman Thampi; Kalipilla Thankachi

Lakshmy Pilla (14 February 1820 – 13 February 1904), better identified as Kutti Kunju Thankachi, was an Indian composer and writer of Malayalam literature, known to be the first female poet and composer of Kerala. The daughter of Irayimman Thampi, the noted composer of Omanathinkal Kidavo and a musician at the court of Swathi Thirunal, she was the author of a number of attakathas such as Parvathiswayamvaram and Mithrasahamoksham. Sreemathy Swayamvaram and a play, Ajnathavasam.

== Biography ==
Kutti Kunju Thankachi, née Lakshmy Pilla, was born on 14 February 1820 at Vilavancode taluk of the Travancore state, presently in Kanyakumari district of the south Indian state of Tamil Nadu, to Irayimman Thampi and Kalipilla Thankachi. Her early education was under her father; (Note: She was known to be his only student of Irayimman Thampi) she studied under Harippadu Kochuppilla Varrier, simultaneously learning Thiruvathira dance from her father. Her first marriage was in 1834 to Kunjan Thampan of Cherthala Varanadu Naduvilel Kovilakam but after the death of Thampan in 1851, she married again in 1861; the marriage with Kunjunni Thampan lasting a decade until his death in 1871. She had eight children, from her two marriages. She was afflicted with eye disease from her childhood, lost her eyesight completely by 1902 and died on 13 February 1904, at the age of 83.

== Legacy ==
Thankachi, known to be the first woman poet and composer of Kerala, wrote eighteen books comprising three attakathas, Parvathiswayamvaram, Mithrasahamoksham and Sreemathy Swayamvaram, several poems, two kurathi songs, a thullal and a play, Ajnathavasam. Noted critic, S. Gupthan Nair, has stated that Thankachi had gained popularity as a poet during her time itself and people used to visit her to read their poems to listen to her opinions. She was known to have good knowledge of Sanskrit and she composed songs in several ragas such as Kambhoji, Kalyaani, Naatta, Khamas and Surutti.

== Literary contributions ==
No.	Work	Genre
1	Shivaraari Mahatmyam	Thiruvathira songs
2	Seetha Swayamvaram'	Thiruvathira songs
3	Narada Mohanam	Thiruvathira songs
4	Thiruvananthapuram Sthalapuranam	Kilippattu
5	Vaikom Sthalapuranam	Kilippattu
6	Kiratham	Kurathipattu (folk song)
7	Nalacharitham	Kurathipattu (folk song)
8	Ganga Snanam	Tullal
9	Parvathiswayamvaram	Attakatha
10	Mithrasahamoksham	Attakatha
11	Sreemathy Swayamvaram	Attakatha
12	Anchita Saubhagya Lakshmi (for Princess Vanchi)	Tharattu (lullaby)
13	Ajnathavasam	Play
14	Asharavamsha Dinesha Vibho	Kummi (folk song)

== Musical compositions ==
Work	Language	Raga	Tala	Remarks
Katyayan mam palaya	Malayalam	Kambhoji	Adi tala	on Palkulangara Devi
Saamaja hara hara	Malayalam	Kalyani	Adi tala	on Thiruvattar Keshava Swami
Sooryakoti sama prabha makute	Sanskrit	Nata	Adi tala	on Mookambika
Paahi mohana krute	Sanskrit	Khamas	Adi tala	on Neyyattinkara Sree Krishna Swami
Anandaroopa hare	Malayalam	Pantuvarali	Chapu	on Malayinkeezhu Sree Krishna Swami
Shri pavanapurusha	Malayalam	Suruti	Adi tala	on Lord Krishna
Bandurangi Kintu cheyvu njan	Malayalam	Huseni	Adi tala	Padam
Balike, pokarudanetho	Malayalam	Shankarabharanam	Adi tala	Padam
Indal valarunnitayyayyo	Malayalam	Bilahari	Adi tala	Padam
Ha ramananayi maranno	Malayalam	Kambhoji	Adi tala	Padam
Kulasekhara maharaja bhupathe	Sanskrit	Darbar	Roopaka	Tillana
Dayithe thurakkoo vathil	Malayalam	Todi	Adi tala	Vathilthurapattu (Door opening songs)
Yahi yahi mohanakarte	Malayalam	Madhyamavathi	Adi tala	Vathilthurapattu (Door opening songs)
Kaama komalaakaara	Malayalam	Ragamalika	Adi tala	Vathilthurapattu (Door opening songs)

== See also ==
- List of Malayalam-language authors by category
- List of Malayalam-language authors
