= Sera Chöding Hermitage =

Tibetan Buddhist hermitage near Lhasa, Tibet, China

- Tibetan transcription(s); Wylie transliteration: Se ra chos sdings ri khrod
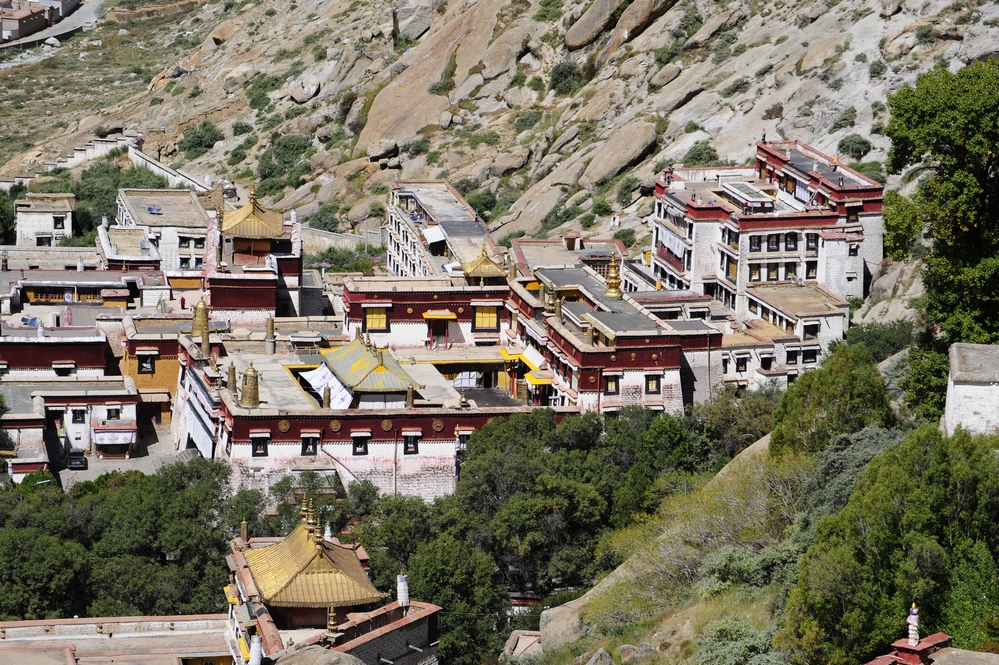
- Sera Chöding Hermitage

- Location within Tibet

Religion
- Affiliation: Tibetan Buddhism

Location
- Location: Lhasa Prefecture, Tibet, China
- Country: China
- Interactive map of Sera Chöding Hermitage
- Coordinates: 29°41′53″N 91°08′00″E

Sera Chöding Hermitage (Se ra chos sdings ri khrod), affiliated with Sera Monastery, is situated in Lhasa prefecture of Tibetan Autonomous Region of the People's Republic of China. It is located close to the Sera Monastery and faces south. The hermitage has a yellow house, which was originally built by the Tibetan Guru Tsongkhapa who spent many years there, spread over several occasions. It was his favourite meditating place and he wrote his great work, the “Great Commentary on the Prajñāmūla (Rtsa shes Dīk chen), while in residence. He also taught there. It is also known as the hermitage where Tsongkhapa entrusted his Tantric teachings to Rje shes rab seng ge (1383–1445), the founder of the Tantric Colleges.

== Geography ==
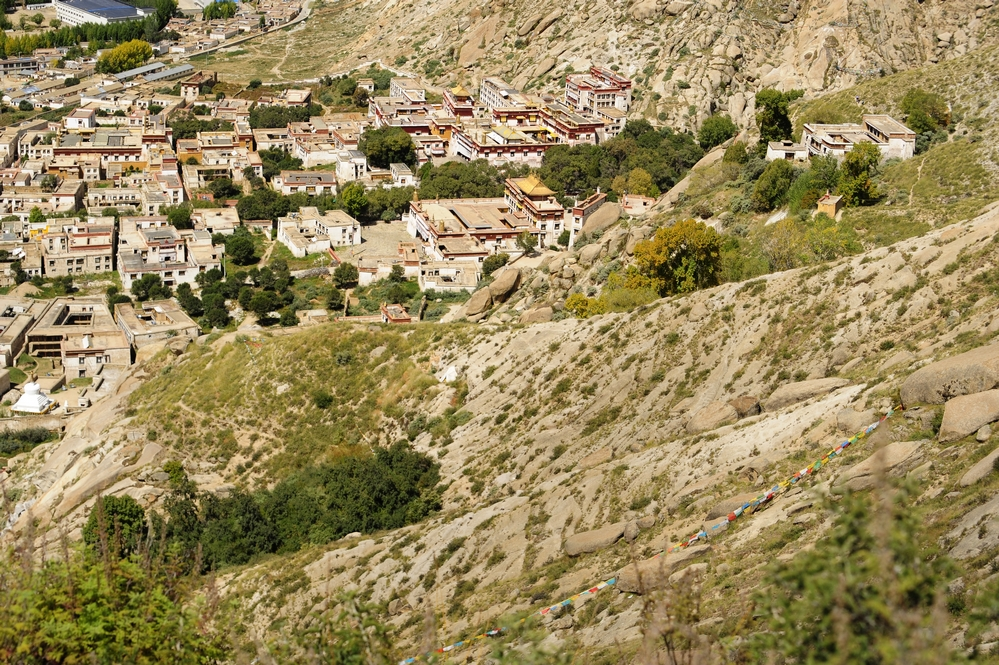
Overview of the Hermitage and the Sera township

Sera Chöding Hermitage is very near Sera Monastery; it lies just behind the Great Assembly Hall, about 15 minutes walk up the Purbochok hill which surrounds the Sera Monastery complex. The hermitage is reached by a track (footpath) where painted rock carvings of Tsongkhapa, Jamchen and Dharma Raja (the protector) are seen flanking the stepped approaches, along the route. A new building has been constructed in place of the old hermitage, which was destroyed during the 1959 Revolution. Below the hermitage are the Upper Tantric College (Gyuto) and Lower Tantric College (Gyu-me) of Lhasa. A further climb up the hill leads to caves where Tsongkhapa meditated.

== History ==
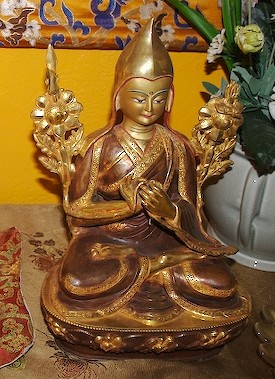
Je Tsongkhapa considered the hermitage as his principal retreat centre

As the main retreat centre of Je Tsongkhapa, the hermitage is credited as the location where, apart from his teaching assignments, he wrote many scriptures, of which his Great Commentary on the "Prajñāmūla (Rtsa shes Dīk chen)" is best known. Thus, from 1419, the hermitage has been the venue of many historic events associated with Tsogkhapa. These include being the location where his most favoured disciple, Mkhas grub rje (1385–1438) met him. Byams chen chos rje (1354–1435), known as the supreme master, Jamchen Choeje Shakya Yeshe (one of the eight famous disciples of Tsongkhapa known as flag bearers of his teachings and the founder of Sera Monastery) was ordered to go to China as his emissary.

The hermitage is also revered as the location where Tsongkhapa subdued the “site-spirit” that was transformed into a protector of Buddhism, and where Tsongkhapa fully initiated Rje shes rab seng ge (1383–1445), the founder of the Tantric Colleges in to Tantric teachings. While entrusting the secrets of the tantric teachings contained in the text, Tsongkhapa is also said to have given to Rje shes rab seng ge the mask of Chogyel, the skull-club that he had found, his own skull-cup inner offering bowl, a statue of "Guhyasamaja (gSang-ba ‘dus-pa)", and seven special thangka (thang-ka) scroll paintings.

Rje shes rab seng ge’s association resulted in the monastery's affiliation with the Lower Tantric College. The hermitage also became one of the colleges where the annual ritual cycle (tantric) was observed. Prior to 1959, Sera deputed a monk to this hermitage as caretaker of the main temple. Subsequent to the permission granted by the Chinese to rebuild smaller monasteries in the precincts of Lhasa, the hermitage was formally taken over by the Sera Monastery. It is now under the care of a monk who keeps the hermitage open for pilgrims and visitors.

== Structure ==
The hermitage complex faces south. It has several structures built along the west–east direction. The "yellow retreat hut" seen here was the main hermitage of Tsongkhapa’s (1357–1419). According to a local legend, the ‘local site-spirit’ (gzhi bdag) used to enter through a small window in this house to meet Tsonkhapa. A further legend is that a fresco of Tsongkhapa on the wall in the room is stated to be a speaking-statue, an “image that speaks” (gsung byon ma).

A large temple or Assembly hall (’du khang), immediately below the yellow retreat hut to its east, is the Lower Tantric College where the annual ritual cycles or chos thog is observed. The frescoes seen in the "clerestory of the temple" are of pre-1959 vintage. The second floor of this temple is an administrative office. It also provides guest house accommodation to the visiting officials and clergy of the Tantric College (sngags pa grwa tshang).

Apart from the above buildings, other structures of importance are the two Dharma compounds (chos rwa); one courtyard is next to the main temple, while the other is in the vicinity of a spring. The spring, sacred to the "White Manjushri", was discovered on advice given by the abbot of Sera, Dge bshes seng ge (d. 1990s); its water is reported to have some curative properties. A small building has also been erected at the location where Tsongkhapa sat (known as a 'throne') and gave his discourses which resulted in compilation of the book titled “The Ocean of Reasoning (Rigs pa’i rgya mstho). Many huts and caves in the precincts of the hermitage were used by Tsongkhapa’s disciples. The location of the hermitage also provides an impressive view of Sera Monastery complex.
