= Dharma Raja =

Maharaja of Travancore from 1758 to 1798

- Sri Padmanabha Dasa Vanchi Pala Kulashekara Kiritapathi Munne Sultan Maharaja Raja Rama Raja Bahadur Shamsheer Jung
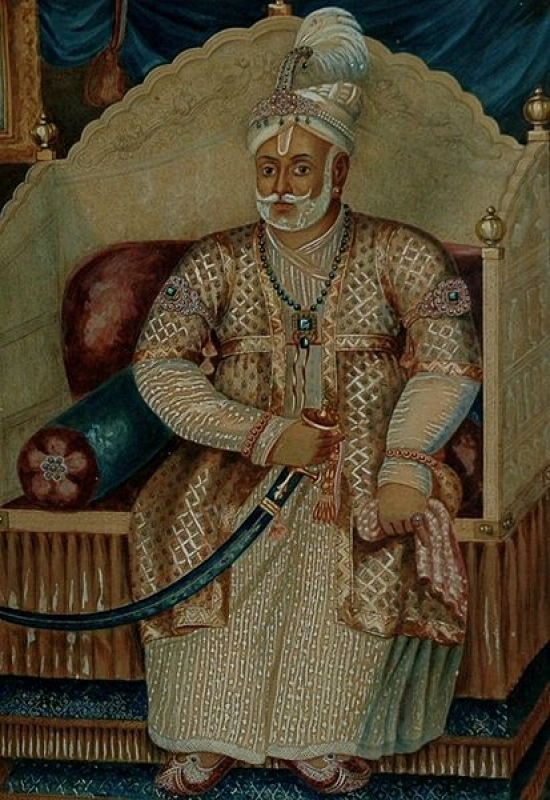

Maharaja of Travancore
- Reign: 7 July 1758 – 17 February 1798
- Predecessor: Marthanda Varma
- Successor: Balarama Varma
- Born: 1724
- Died: 17 February 1798 (aged 73–74)
- House: Venad Swaroopam
- Dynasty: Kupaka
- Religion: Hinduism

Karthika Thirunal Rama Varma (1718–17 February 1792), often referred to as Rama Varma I or Dharma Raja, was the Maharajah of Travancore from 1758 until his death in 1798. He succeeded his uncle Marthanda Varma, who is credited with the title of "maker of modern Travancore". During his reign Dharma Raja not only retained all the territories his predecessor had gained but administered the kingdom with success. He was addressed as Dharma Raja on account of his strict adherence to Dharma Sastra, the Hindu principles of justice by providing asylum to thousands of Hindus and Christians fleeing Malabar during the Mysorean conquest of Malabar.

== Early life ==
Rama Varma was born in 1724 as the son of the Senior Rani of Attingal with her husband Prince Ravi Varma Koil Thampuran of the Kilimanoor palace. He had a brother Prince Makayiram Thirunal, grandfather of Irayimman Thampi, who died young and thus Karthika Thirunal was destined to come into power. His mother was adopted from the royal house of Kolathunad in 1718 by the then King of Venad into the Travancore Royal Family. He was born into a time of political turmoil caused by the refractory Lords, the Ettuveetil Pillamar as also enemies of Venad such as the Rajah of Kayamkulam. When Karthika Thirunal was only four years of age, in 1728, his father died foiling an assassination bid by the Kayamkulam Rajah, when the prince along with his parents were travelling from Haripad to the domains of the Vanjipuzha Thampuran, a Brahmin chief, at Budhanur. As he grew up, he took part actively in the military conquests of his uncle Maharajah Marthanda Varma and assisted him in establishing the modern state of Travancore by annexing kingdom after kingdom up to the Cochin to Venad.

== Succession and initial career ==
With the death of his uncle Marthanda Varma in 1758, Karthika Thirunal Rama Varma succeeded to the Travancore musnud. With the able services of the Dalawa Ayyapan Marthanda Pillai, Karthika Thirunal began his reign. Under his uncle's reign, Travancore had gained the reputation of being the most powerful state in Kerala and hence, many of the neighbouring chiefs wished to execute friendship treaties with the Maharajah. The fortunes of the Cochin royal family were at the lowest ebb. A very small portion of their original territory alone remained in the Cochin Raja's possession. From 1755, the Zamorin (Samoothiri) of Calicut, was in possession of the major portions of Cochin. Although Marthanda Varma had promised help against the Zamorin by signing a treaty of alliance in 1756 with Cochin, he took no steps to help. Most of the barons of Kochi had sided with the enemy. The Dutch were the permanent friends and protectors of Cochin, but they withdrew their contingents from the field when the Zamorin promised to give back to them 'Chetwai' which he had conquered from them, on his way to Cochin. The Raja of Cochin deputed his nephew to ask for prompt assistance from Rama Varma. The recollections of the past shady dealings and breach of faith on the part of the Cochin rulers naturally had raised apprehensions in the Maharaja that his neighbour might not adhere to his promise when he felt his position secure. The same feeling might have prevented Marthanda Varma, his uncle, from rendering assistance immediately. Months passed. At last the Raja of Cochin met with Rama Varma to press his request. He strengthened his promises with the sanction of religion.

On the 25th of the Tamil month 'Adi' of 937 ME (1761) the Raja of Cochin read the terms of their treaty and solemnly swore to abide by its terms, in the presence of the Deity Sthanumoorthy of Suchindrum Temple near Cape Commorin, the ministers of the two kingdoms and the spiritual authorities also being present and the signed document was delivered to the representative of the Maharaja of Travancore. In pursuance of the treaty, the Travancore Maharaja commanded his Minister Dalawa Ayyappan Marthanda Pillai and his Dutch General D'Lannoy to proceed to the north at the head of a large army to liberate Cochin kingdom from the clutches of Zamorin of Calicut kingdom. The account of this campaign is best given in the words of late Mr. C. Achyutha Menon, a native of Cochin, whose acquaintance with the records of the Cochin government, to which he was secretary for a long time, enabled him to speak with unassailable authority.

"Early in March, the combined army marched in two divisions to attack the Zamorin's forces stationed in Parur and Alangad. But the latter abandoned these districts without striking a blow and retreated to Cranganur and Mapranam. The division under Marthanda Pillai fell upon the Zamorin's men in Mapranam and pursued them to Trichur where they were attacked in the front by the Travancoreans and in the rear by a body of men from Kavalapara and Perattuvithi, the best fighters in Cochin at the time. The Calicut forces suffered heavily in the fight at Trichur and fled precipitately to their fortified stations in Kunnankulam and Chelakara. In the meantime, the division under D'Lannoy dislodged the Zamorin's men from Cranganore and pursued them beyond the Chetwa river and marching to Trichur by way of Enamakal, found the place already in the occupation of Dalawa Marthanda Pillai. The combined army then advanced to Chelakara and after a severe engagement, drove the Zamorin's men beyond the northern frontier of Cochin. From Chelakara they marched to Kunnamkulam, whereupon the Calicut forces stationed there retreated to Ponnani. General D'Lannoy now proposed to carry the war into the enemy's territory, but the Zamorin, becoming alarmed for the safety of his country, sued for peace".

The Zamorin sent an express messenger to Trivandrum to beg the Maharaja to stay the hands of his General. Just as his uncle Marthanda Varma had ordered him and Dalawa Ramayyan to desist from the conquest of Cochin, when they were about to do so in 929 M.E., Rama Varma Maharaja now ordered his Dalawa to advance no further. In 1759, the Rajah of Cochin sent his nephew to sign a treaty with Travancore. In the same year, a few months later, the Rajah himself visited Travancore along with his minister Paliath Achan and signed a treaty with Travancore and secured aid to free his territories from the control of the Zamorin of Calicut. The Zamorin's request to forgive him was complied with in 1763 and in the next year the Zamorin visited Padmanabhapuram, capital of Venad and signed a treaty of friendship and reimbursed to Travancore the expenses of the war amounting to Rs 150,000. The little kingdoms of Parur and Alangad were also annexed to Travancore after pensioning off the ruling families.

In 932 ME, Marthanda Varma had projected the construction of a line of fortifications on the northern frontier, but his death the following year prevented anything substantial being done. The experience gained in the course of the war with the Zamorin convinced the Dewan and the General, of the necessity of continuing and strengthening the lines which would not only protect Cochin in some measure from any possible aggression by the Zamorin, but would also be serviceable to Travancore in the event of an invasion from Mysore. The scheme was then taken up.

The Raja of Cochin was in entire agreement with the proposal. The line of fortifications was taken from the sea near the island of Vaipeen right up to the ghats covering a distance of nearly 40 kilometres (25 mi). The Raja of Cochin agreed to bear a portion of the costs in addition to permitting the construction of the many portions passing through the Cochin territory. In fact the Dutch records stated that Maharajah Marthanda Varma deliberately refrained from annexing Cochin on an earlier occasion so as to maintain a buffer-state between his kingdom and Mysore of Hyder Ali. The famous Nedum Kotta or 'the Northern Defense-Line of Travancore' subsequently became a major obstacle in Tipu Sultan's attempt to conquer Travancore; he called it "the contemptible wall".

Certain territorial disputes arose between Travancore and the Nawab of Arcot which were eventually settled, though the Maharajah had to part with large sums of money and some territories mainly because the British East India Company's officers had compelled him, as the Nawab was a familiar figure at Madras and his propensities for perpetual borrowing at extra hazardous rates of interest enlisted their sympathies. The Maharaja obtained in return, lands in Shencottah and the temple at Cape Comorin, which were at the time not part of Travancore but were desired by the Maharajah to round off his dominions.

== Dharma Raja and Hyder Ali ==
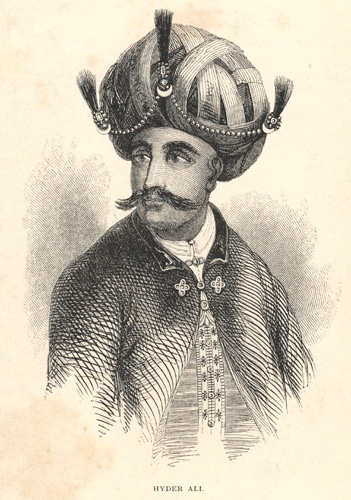
Hyder Ali

Hyder Ali had usurped the throne of Mysore and was keen to invade and bring the smaller coastal kingdoms of Malabar and Travancore under his sway. As early as 1756, he had invaded Malabar at the instance of the ruler of Palghat to help him reg

ies captured by the Zamorin of Calicut. The Zamorin was driven away and saved his kingdom by agreeing to pay the princely sum of Rs. 1.2 million to Hyder Ali. In 1766, Hyder invaded Malabar a second time. The Rajah of Kolathunad fled to Travancore, while the Zamorin, after hastening his family's departure to Travancore, committed suicide in his own palace. Hyder Ali also started treaty negotiations with the Dutch who, since their defeat in the Battle of Colachel had been in awe of Travancore, kept the Maharajah of Travancore informed of all developments. What Hyder wanted was a free passage to Travancore through the Dutch territories. The Dutch Governor replied that he had informed Batavia of Hyder's request and was waiting for a reply.

Soon rumours of a proposed invasion of Travancore started developing after the Maharajah refused to stop construction of the Nedumkotta, which passed near the Dutch possessions, through Cochin territories, and because he had given refuge to Hyder Ali's enemies. Hyder asked the kings of Cochin and Travancore to pay the expenses of his Malabar campaign. The tribute to be paid by Cochin was Rs. 400,000 and 10 elephants, while Travancore was asked to pay Rs. 1.5 million and 30 elephants. Hyder added that if Travancore refused, "He will pay a visit". While the Rajah of Cochin agreed, Karthika Thirunal of Travancore replied, stating that it was "neither to please him nor in accordance with his advice that the invasion of Malabar was undertaken". But he stated that if Hyder withdrew from Malabar and reinstated the Kolathunad and Calicut Rajahs to their thrones, he would agree to a payment. This was taken by Hyder as a threat, but before he could plan an attack on Travancore, he had to return to Mysore.

== Dharma Raja and Tipu Sultan ==
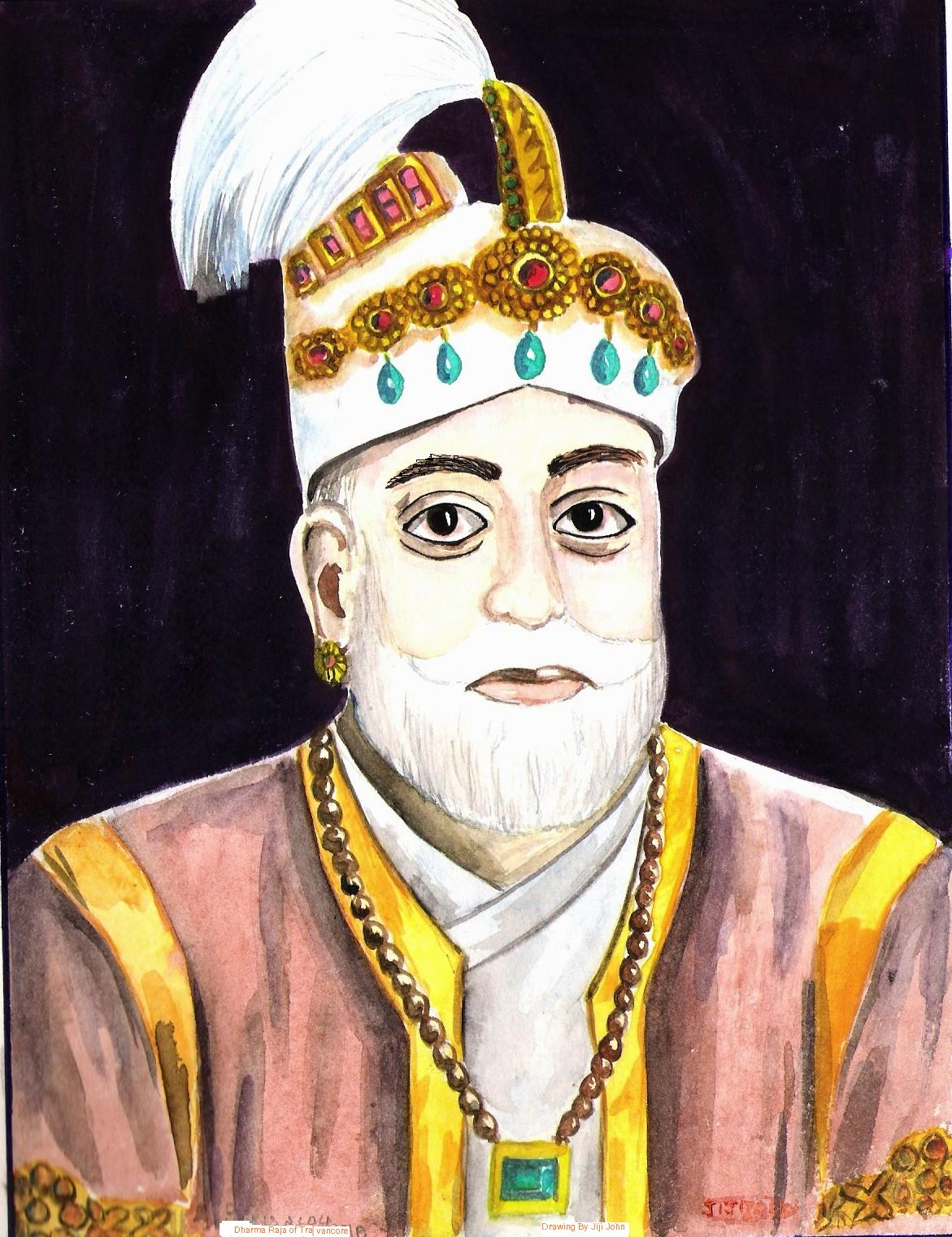
Dharma Raja

In 1788, a rebellion broke out in the territories and vassal states of Mysore, now ruled by Tipu Sultan, son and successor of Hyder Ali. Tipu entered the regions of Malabar and Coorg to put these rebellions down, engaging in tactics that included the forced deportation to Seringapatam and the conversion to Islam by force, of Hindus. The royal families of Malabar and large numbers of Hindu and Christian families fled to Travancore, where they were received and treated hospitably by the Maharajah. Tipu Sultan now demanded that the Rajah of Cochin, who had accepted the status of a vassal, to claim Alangad and Parur so as to provide Tipu with a pretext for an invasion of Travancore. However, the Rajah diplomatically assured Tipu that he would convince the Rajah of Travancore to become a vassal of Tipu like himself. Tipu then sent envoys to Travancore with a 'Khareeta', wherein he stated that "I have learnt that you desire to cultivate friendship with our Sircar..". The Maharajah received Tipu's envoys in the presence of an East India Company representative, which was taken as an affront by Tipu. The Maharajah also negotiated with the British for a force to assist in the defense of Travancore, anticipating an attack from Tipu Sultan. Finally in 1789, arguing that the Nedumkotta passed illegally through the territories of Cochin, his vassal state, Tipu Sultan gathered his entire force in Malabar and marched to invade Travancore.

Tipu and his forces reached the Nedumkotta line which protected Travancore's northern frontier and launched an attack in late December 1789. But a small number Travancore soldiers managed to change the course of events, by opening fire on the 14,000 Mysore infantry from a close cover that killed the Mysorean officer leading a bayonet charge. The Mysorean column, hemmed in by the confines of the wall, retreated in confusion and Tipu Sultan himself was carried away by the crowd. His palanquin, seals, rings, sword and other personal ornaments fell into the hands of the Travancore armies under the Dewan Raja Kesavadas Pillai. Tipu fell back into the ditch twice before scrambling out and the occasional lameness which he suffered until his death was due to the contusions suffered by his fall into the ditches of Travancore.

Tippu sent a letter on 19 January 1790 to Budruz Zuman Khan. It said:

"Don't you know I have achieved a great victory recently in Malabar and over four lakh Hindus were converted to Islam? I am determined to march against that cursed Raman Nair very soon. Since I am overjoyed at the prospect of converting him and his subjects to Islam, I have happily abandoned the idea of going back to Srirangapatanam now".

In the following weeks, Tipu Sultan, stung by his defeat, complained to the English Governor Holland at Madras in a pre-dated letter that his soldiers were searching for fugitives from Malabar and that it was Travancore which had taken the offensive. Finally, Tipu attacked the Nedumkotta again after waiting for three months for further reinforcements to arrive from Coorg, Bangalore and Seringapatam. For nearly a month, the Travancore army under the protection of the Nedumkotta lines, managed to defend the state. However, finally a breach of about 1 km (3/4-mile) in length was effected and the Mysorean army entered Travancore. Soon, the entire Nedumkotta fell into the hands of Tipu Sultan, who captured large quantities of ammunition and 200 cannons. The British forces stationed to assist Travancore did not provide aid to Travancore, but remained passive spectators, since they had not received orders from Governor Hollond to fight with the Sultan, much to the despair of the Maharajah. When orders were finally received, it was too late and the British Commander thought it injudicious to commit his soldiers against the large Mysorean army. Tipu's army now devastated the whole of northern Travancore and reached Alwaye and camped on the Periyar River, although Tipu's officers advised the Sultan against it. Hindu temples were destroyed and the subjects fled to the forests. The entire country was laid waste with fire and sword. Even Christians were not spared. The Dewan Raja Kesavadas of Travancore toiled ceaselessly and raised batteries at various places further south, and surrounded them with deep ditches and prepared to obstruct Tipu from proceeding further into Travancore.

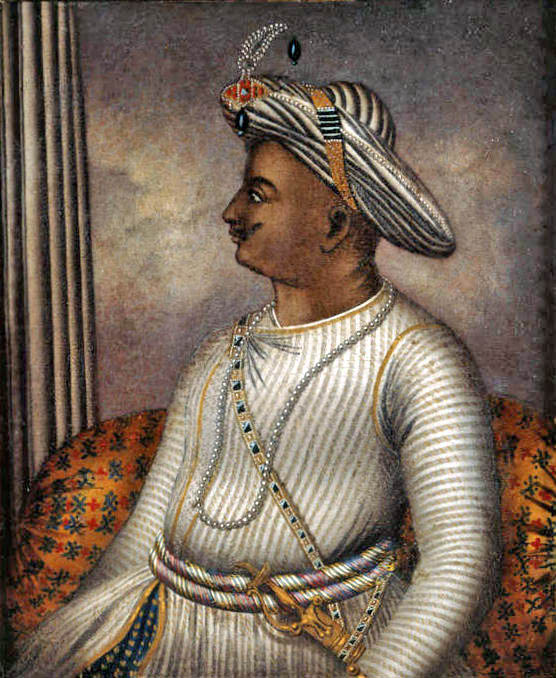
Tippu Sultan, 1792

The Sultan and his army now moved to a place where the Travancore army had built a wall across the river obstructing the water, leaving the river-bed dry. In spite of the warnings of some of his Generals, Tipu decided to wage a battle here at night, certain of his superior numbers. Tipu first ordered two of his cushoons to advance and take over the defences which they accomplished with valour. At day-break, the Travancoreans broke down the retaining wall, letting the water flood onto the Mysorean forces. A large number of Tipu's soldiers were killed by the sudden flood and the road of succour and assistance to the advance guard was cut off. The remaining forces were defeated by a sudden attack by Travancore under the Dewan and an able General known as Kali Kutty Nair (Posthumously elevated to Kali Kutty Pillai). Of the soldiers of Tipu, who formed the advance guard, none returned to the presence of the Sultan. Three or four hundred cavalry soldiers met with death in front of him. Tipu was begged off his Palki by his General Kamruddin Khan, who fell at his feet, asking him to retreat to his camp. Kamruddin saw to it that Tipu was carried on the shoulders of loyal soldiers across the waters to the other side of the river. The Sultan's Palki with bed, some personal ornaments, and a dagger fell into the hands of Travancore soldiers. Although the Sultan was once again defeated and prevented from gaining any more ground in Travancore, the Dewan increased the garrison of the forts further South and maintained a military force ready for battle in any case.

Meanwhile, Governor-General Cornwallis removed the acting Governor of Madras Mr. Hollond from his post, because he had not provided any aid to Travancore in the battle. The new Governor mobilised the British forces stationed in Travancore to support the Maharajah. Hearing of this, Tipu Sultan decided to retreat from Travancore and Malabar to his own kingdom, to avoid war with the British. But war did occur, in which Travancore provided its forces to the British. The Third Anglo-Mysore War led by the Governor-General Cornwallis in person eventually led to the defeat of Tipu Sultan at his capital Seringapatnam in 1792. Tipu Sultan surrendered and the Treaty of Seringapatam was signed. The terms of surrender were particularly harsh in that Tipu had to hand over two of his sons as hostages to British custody until he cleared the amount of ₹ 33 million fixed as the costs of the British campaign against him.

== Treaty with the British ==
Following the Treaty of Seringapatanam, the British demanded large sums from Travancore for the expenses of the war although by treaty they had to bear the expenses. Further, a huge amount was collected from Tippu himself towards the war-expenses. The Maharaja paid it as he was not in a military position to oppose the English. A subsidiary alliance was made between Travancore and the British by which a subsidiary force of the East India Company was to be stationed in Travancore. Besides, the Maharajah was also to help the British during times of need.

== Reforms ==
- Communications were opened to facilitate trade and business in the state by the Maharajah under the able Dewanship of Rajah Kesavadas. Ports were improved and various new products were exported by Travancore during this reign. Ship building was also given importance and several developments in this regard took place.
- Gold coins known as Anantharayan Panam, 'Chinna Panam' and 'Ananthavarahan' were minted in Travancore in addition to a large bullion of silver, coined as 'Chakrams (pronounced as 'chuck-rums')'.
- During wartime taxes were raised but after the payments to the British and overcoming wartime expenses, these taxes were remitted.
- The capital at Thiruvananthapuram was developed and infrastructure like bridges and other public works such as canals for irrigation were constructed. Bazaars and shopping centres were started for the benefit of the people.
- The fortifications were bettered as also the ammunition and weapon manufacture was undertaken with greater vigor, particularly the manufacturing of guns. Palaces in different parts of the country were developed and new ones built.
- An interesting insight into the religious tolerance of the Maharajah is gained through a letter by Pope Clement XIV wherein he thanked the Maharajah for the kindness to the members of his church in Travancore and officially placed all the Christians in Travancore under the protection of the sovereign.

== Kathakali playwright and composer ==
As the composer of Kathakali Plays (attakadha). He set a systematic curriculum for teaching Kathakali. Being a good vocalist and scholar in music and dance, he composed excellent Kritis which have enriched Carnatic music. He was perhaps the first violinist from the royal family. He has to his credit nearly 150 compositions. Moreover he is noted to have had a deep friendship with poetess Manorama Thampuratti. It was with the advent of the Kathakali plays of Karthika Thirunal that many reforms were brought in Kathakali. Changes were implemented in the structure of plays and in their technique to be adopted during presentation. Priority was given for sringara padas. The rule that each character should enter the stage with sringara padas was introduced by him. Kathakali characters must enter by presenting pada in Padi raga. All his kathakali plays attained much popularity and fame on account of its technical superiority in stage presentation, variety and vividness of characters and the story. He has to his credit seven plays:

- Rajasooyam,
- Subhadrapaharanam,
- Gandharvavijayam,
- Panchali Svayamvaram,
- Bakavadham,
- Kalayanasougandhikam (Thekkan or southern style)
- Narakasuravadham.

== Demise and legacy ==
The maharajah died on 17 February 1798, at the age of 74, after a long reign that was prosperous, save for the invasion of the kingdom by Tipu Sultan. He had maintained the sovereignty of Travancore and protected it from destruction by the superior Mysore forces. He maintained the friendship cultivated with the British by his uncle Marthanda Varma. More importantly, he came to be known as Dharma Raja due to the asylum he provided to the thousands of people from Malabar fleeing to escape forced proselytization by Tipu Sultan. So pleased were these subjects of Malabar that many families of kings and nobles stayed back in Travancore.

Karthika Thirunal Maharajah had four wives or Ammachis. His first wife was Panapillai Kali Amma Nagamani Amma from Vadasseri. His other three wives hailed from Thiruvattar, Arumana, and Nagercoil. He constructed four Ammaveedus for his wives in Trivandrum in the last decade of the 18th century and these families are his descendants. The Maharajah's brother married from the Puthumana Ammaveedu and his grandson was the poet Irayimman Thampi. The Maharajah's descendant from Arumana Ammaveedu married Balarama Varma, his successor, and their descendant was the consort of Visakham Thirunal Maharajah.

== See also ==
- Padmanabhapuram Palace
- Mysore invasion of Malabar
- Battle of Thrissur (1763)
- Battle of Nedumkotta (1789)

== Notes ==
Dharma Raja Kulasekhara Dynasty Born: 1724 Died: 1798
Regnal titles
Preceded by Marthanda Varma	Maharaja of Travancore; 1758–1798	Succeeded by Balarama Varma
