= Palkulangara =

- Town
- Location in Kerala, India Palkulangara (India)
- Coordinates: 8°29′42″N 76°55′45″E
- Country: India
- State: Kerala
- District: Thiruvananthapuram

Languages
  - Official: Malayalam, English
- Time zone: UTC+5:30 (IST)
- PIN: 695024
- Telephone code: 0471
- Vehicle registration: KL-01

Palkulangara is an urban neighbourhood of Thiruvananthapuram, the capital of the Indian state of Kerala.

== Location ==
Palkulangara is around 1 km from Pettah Junction, 700 m from West Fort Junction and 1.5 km from Chakkai Bypass Junction. The nearest airport is Trivandrum International Airport and the nearest railway station is Pettah Railway Station. The place is famous for Palkulangara Devi Temple, one of the most ancient temples in Kerala.

== Religion ==
The population of Palkulangara mainly practices Hinduism. The area predominantly consists of people from the Nair community.

=== Religious Places ===
- Palkulangara Devi Temple
- Cheriyaudeswaram Mahavishnu Temple also known as 'Appuppan kovil'

== Main Landmarks ==
- NSS Higher Secondary School Palkulangara
- Punjab National Bank
- NSS Karayogam
