= Irayimman Thampi =

Indian composer

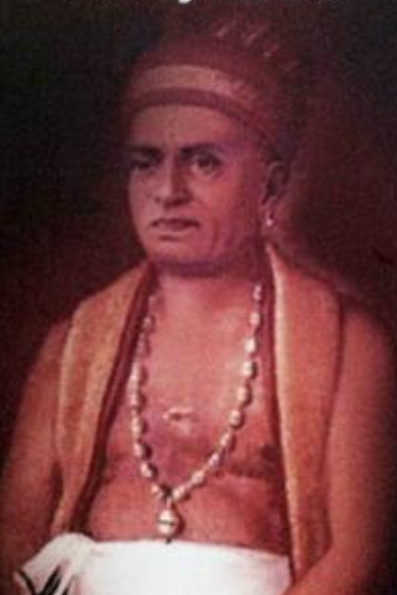
- Irayimman Thampi
- Born: Iravivarman Thampi; 1782; Kottakkakom Kizhake Madom, Karamana, Travancore
- Died: 1856 (aged 73–74); Travancore
- Occupations: Musician, Poet
- Known for: Carnatic music
- Notable work: Omanathinkal Kidavo; Prana Naathan Enikku Nalkiya; Karuna Cheyyaan Enthu Thaamasam
- Spouse: Kali Pillai Thankachi
- Parents: Kerala Varma Thampuran; Parukkutti Thankachi

Iravivarman Thampi, better known as Irayimman Thampi (1782–1856), was an Indian Carnatic musician, music composer and poet from the Kingdom of Travancore. He was a vocalist in the court of Swathi Thirunal. His compositions include the lullaby Omanathinkal Kidavo, one of the most popular lullabies in Malayalam.

== Biography ==
Irayimman Thampi, named Iravivarman Thampi after his grandfather, was born in 1782 at Kottakkakom Kizhake Madom, in Karamana, Travancore to Kerala Varma Thampuran, of the royal family of Cherthala, and Parvathi Pillai Thankachi of the Puthumana Ammaveedu Thampi family, the daughter of Prince Makayiram Thirunal Ravi Varma and niece of the Maharajah Dharma Raja of Travancore royal family. (Note: Prince Makayiram Thirunal was the younger brother of Dharma Raja) Thampi was brought up by his parents at a house called Kizhake Madom and after early education from his father, he was tutored by Shankaran Elayathu in grammar, linguistics and Sanskrit literature. He dedicated his first poem, written at the age of 14, to Karthika Thirunal Dharma Raja of Travancore which earned him a notable position in the Travancore court, enjoying the patronage of four kings viz. Dharmaraja, Balarama Varma, Swathi Thirunal and Uthram Thirunal as well as two queens, Gouri Parvathy Bai and Gouri Lakshmi Bai.

Irayiman Thampi married Kali Pillai Thankachi, daughter of his maternal uncle Puthumana Krishnan Thampi, and the couple had seven children (Note: Some records say that Thampi had three children) including a daughter, Lakshmi Kutty Pillai Thankachi, better known as Kutty Kunju Thankachi (1820–1914), who continued her father's artistic and poetic legacy. Another daughter was married to Sri Narayanan Thampi of Arumana, son of Maharajah Visakham Thirunal. Irayimman Thampi was already thirty one years of age when Swathi Thirunal was born, but outlived him by a decade. It was for putting Swathi Thirunal to sleep, when he was a baby, that Irayimman Thampi wrote the lullaby Omanathinkal Kidavo, which went on to become one of the most popular lullabies in the Malayalam language.

Thampi is believed to have died in 1856. (Note: Records differ about the year of death of Thampi, the years 1855 (1031 ME) and 1862 are also mentioned as the year of his death.)

== Contributions ==
Thampi's contributions range from attakathas, kirtanas, varnas and padams, and has been published as books.

=== Verses and songs ===
1. Keechakavadham Attakatha
2. Utharaswayamvaram Attakatha
3. Dakshayagam Attakatha
4. Subhadraharanam Kaikottikalippattu
5. Murajapa Pana
6. Navarathri prabandham
7. Omanathinkal Kidavo - set in Rāga Neelambari
8. Vasishtam killippattu
9. Rasakrida
10. Rajasevakramam Manipravalam
11. Somapoma - set in Rāga Saveri
12. Adimalar - set in Rāga Mukhari

=== Kirtanas ===
1. Neelavarna pahimam (surutti - chempata)
2. Pāhimām giritanayē - Rāga Saveri - miśra cāpu
3. Karuna Cheyvan - set in Shree ragam (Later made in Yadukula Kamboji by Chembai Vaidyanatha Bhagavathar)
4. Adimalarinnathanne (Mukhari - chempata)
- Nityamāśrayē - rītigauḷa - Adi tala

=== Varnams ===
1. Ambā gauri girikanyē - stava varNam - Ārabhi
2. Manasi parithapam dussaham ayyo (Sankarabharanam - chempata)

=== Padams ===
1. Aroducholvan Azhalullathellam (indisa - Jhampa)
2. Kamaladikalam Narumalarellam (Kamodari - chempata)
3. Enthujnanihacheyvu (Neelambari - chempata)
4. Prananathanenikkunalkiya (Kamodari - chempata)
