= Ayilyam Thirunal =

Maharaja of Travancore from 1860 to 1880

Ayilyam Thirunal Rama Varma
- Maharaja of Travancore
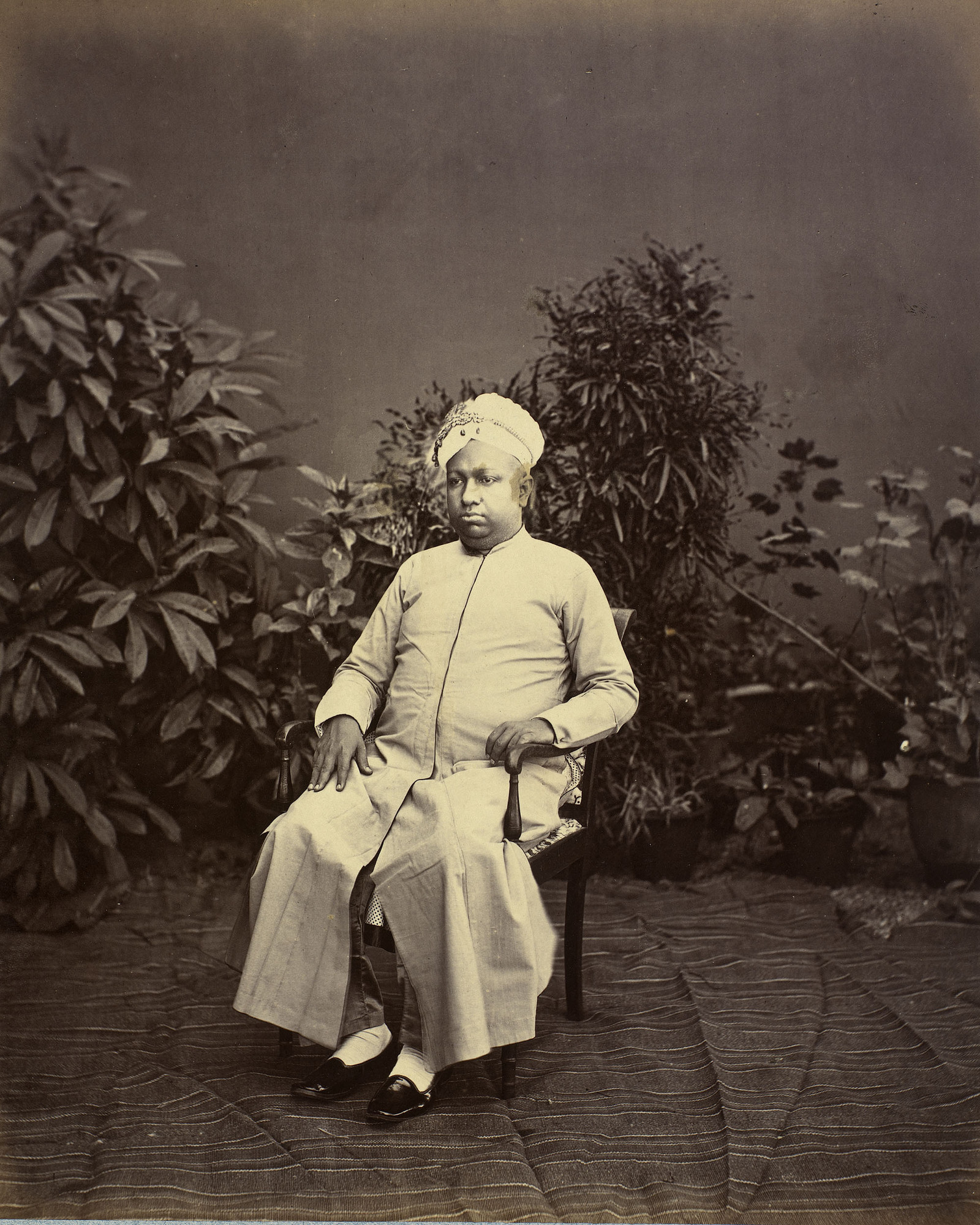
- The Maharaja circa 1875
- Reign: 18 August 1860 – 30 May 1880
- Predecessor: Uthram Thirunal
- Successor: Visakham Thirunal
- Born: 14 March 1832
- Died: 30 May 1880 (aged 48)
- Wives: Panapillai Madhavi Pillai Lakshmi Pillai Kochamma; Kalyanikutty Amma
- House: Venad Swaroopam
- Dynasty: Kulasekhara
- Father: Punartham Thirunal Rama Varma Koil Thampuran
- Mother: Gowri Rukmini Bayi
- Religion: Hinduism

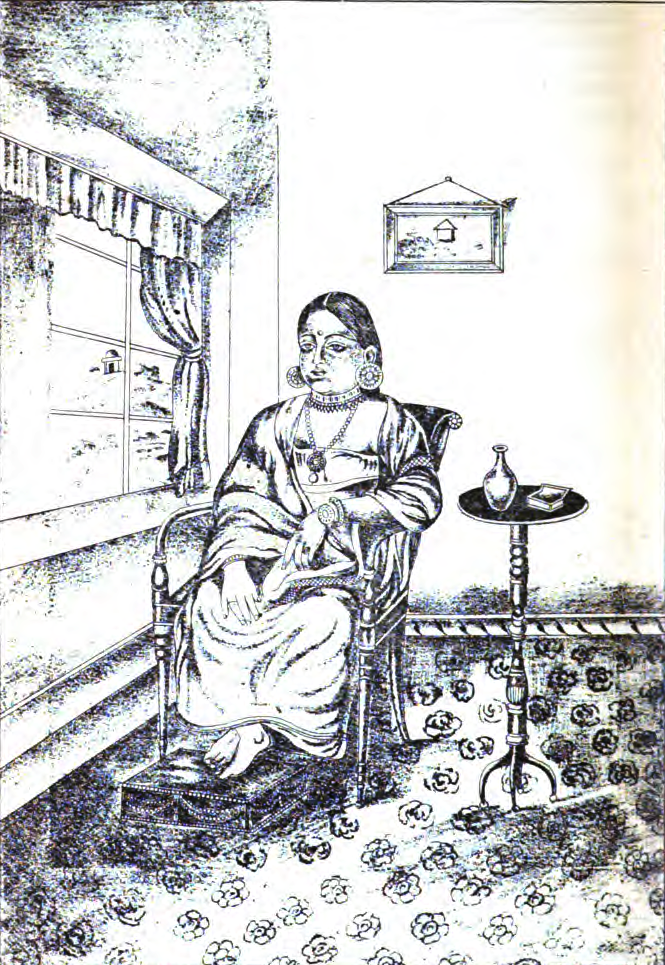
Princess Rukmini Bayi, mother of Ayilyam Thirunal Rama Varma

Sir Sri Ayilyam Thirunal Rama Varma IV GCSI CIE (14 March 1832 – 30 May 1880) was the Maharaja of Travancore from 1860 to 1880. His reign was highly successful, with Travancore, gaining the appellation of "model state of India", with such celebrated administrators as Raja Sir T. Madhava Rao and Sir A. Seshayya Sastri serving him as Diwans. He established GHSS Konni, the oldest school in the entire Pathanamthitta district, at 1863.

Ayilyam Thirunal was the nephew of his predecessors Uthram Thirunal and Swathi Thirunal, and the grandson of Maharani-Regent Gowri Lakshmi Bayi; he was succeeded by his brother, Visakham Thirunal.

== Early life ==
Ayilyam Thirunal was born on 14 March 1832 to Rani Rukmini Bayi, the only sister of Maharajahs Swathi Thirunal and Uthram Thirunal. In the Travancore Royal Family inheritance and primogeniture was determined by the Marumakkathayam system i.e. through the female line. With the accession of Uthram Thirunal in 1846 and his elder brother's exclusion from the line of succession due to imbecility, Ayilyam Thirunal became the Elaya Rajah or heir apparent of Travancore State. Of the seven children born to Rukmini Bayi, only four, including a daughter, Rani Lakshmi Bayi, survived and the eldest and third son were declared unfit to rule owing to mental incapacity. Ayilyam Thirunal's youngest brother Visakham Thirunal was therefore to be his successor.

Ayilyam Thirunal's early education was provided privately and later T. Madhava Rao was appointed tutor to the Elaya Rajah and his brother in 1848. Madhava Rao eventually rose in service and was appointed by Uthram Thirunal in 1857 as Dewan of Travancore and remained in that capacity during the initial decade of Ayilyam Thirunal's reign, until, owing to personal disaffection, he was retired in 1872. In 1854 Ayilyam Thirunal was married to his uncle's daughter, Panapillai Madhavi Pillai Lakshmi Pillai Kochamma of the Thiruvattar Ammaveedu. His consort however died a few years later. In 1860 Maharajah Uthram Thirunal died and Ayilyam Thirunal ascended the musnud as Maharajah.

== Maharajah of Travancore ==
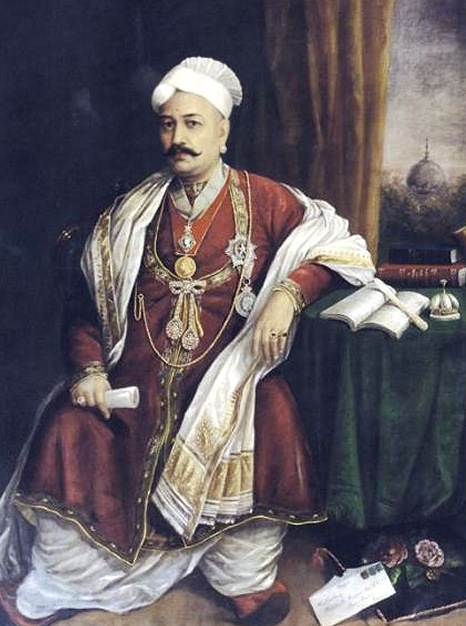
Rajah Sir T. Madhava Rao served as Dewan during The Maharaja's reign

The accession of Ayilyam Thirunal ushered in a new era in Travancore. Assisted by his Dewan T. Madhava Rao, the Maharajah implemented many reforms and changes in Travancore, which were all agreeably beneficial for the state. At the time of his accession, the Travancore Government was struggling with its many debts and mismanaged financial department. Nevertheless, many monopolies, taxes and cessations were abolished by the government. In 1863 the Dewan finally declared that Travancore no longer had any public debt. Gradually salaries of public servants were raised by more than 50% and its efficiency was bettered. A great deal of development in Education, legislation, public works, medicine, vaccination and public health, agriculture etc. was made. Year after year Travancore was commended by the Madras Government. Important proclamations such as the Jenmi-Kudiyan Proclamation of 1867 were made. In 1866 the Maharajah was admitted into the Order of the Star of India while his Dewan was admitted into the Order of the Indian Empire. In the same year the British Government officially granted the title of Maharajah to Ayilyam Thirunal, who was in formal communications so far addressed only as Rajah. By 1872 Travancore was in a prosperous state with a surplus revenue of 4 million rupees. However, by now the relations between the Maharajah and his Dewan, now styled Rajah Sir T. Madhava Rao had turned sour and the latter was retired on a lavish pension of Rs. 1000 per mensem. Seshayya Sastri was now appointed Dewan, a position he held until 1877. The new Dewan concentrated on the development of roads and infrastructure in the state. In 1874 the Maharajah's College in Trivandrum started a Law class and other developments in the education department were made. In 1875, the first systematic census of Travancore was taken by the government. in 1877 Seshayya Sastri was retired on a pension of Rs. 500 per mensem. In accepting this liberal pension, the outgoing Dewan said:

In service, Your Highness made me affluent by the grant of a high salary, out of service, Your Highness makes me comfortable with a liberal pension and a generous donation. The bread thus given will not be eaten in ungratefulness or sulky discontent. The brightest chapter in my life is my service under Your Highness. The little name and fame I have acquired is in reality but the light reflected on the servant by an illustrious master, to serve whom, even for a brief period, has been my pride and privilege

Seshayya Sastri was later admitted into the Order of the Star of India. He was succeeded by Dewan Nanoo Pillai, a native of Travancore. During his premiership which lasted until 1880 irrigation was expanded in Travancore, museums and other institutions were established, surveys of land and agriculture etc. were taken and several other legislative and judicial reforms were passed. With the death of Ayilyam Thirunal in 1880, Nanoo Pillay was retired by his successor, Visakham Thirunal. Prior to this Ayilyam Thirunal had been admitted into the Order of the Indian Empire.

== Personal life ==
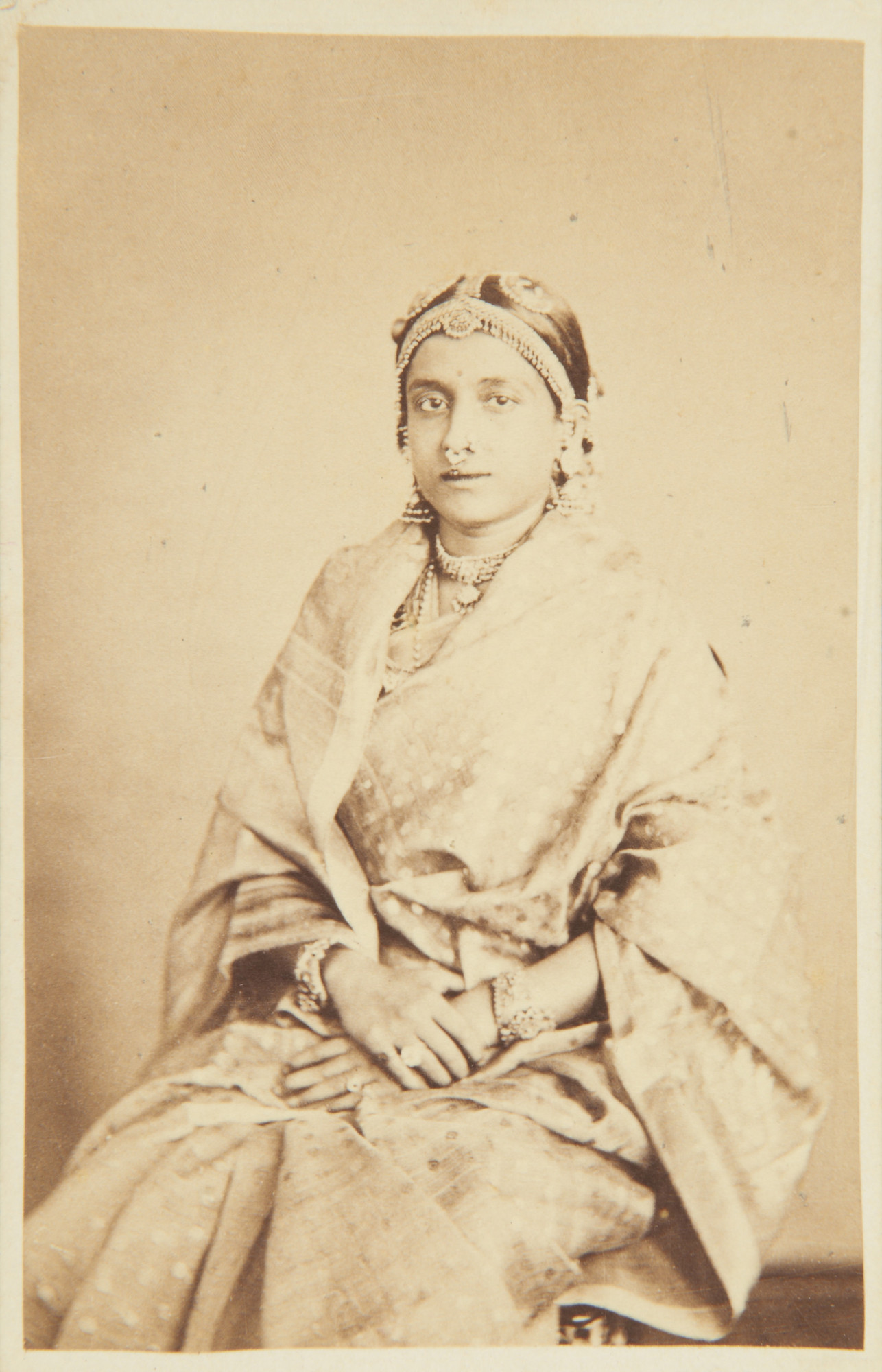
Ammachee, wife of the Maharaja of Travancore in 1868

After the death of Thiruvattar Ammachi, his first consort, the Maharajah married again in 1862 Kalyanikutty Amma of Mathruppillil, a prestigious family of Nadavarambu, Irinjalakuda, Thrissur in the neighbouring state of Cochin. She was born in 1839 as the only daughter of Nadavarambathu Kunju Krishna Menon, a former Dewan of Cochin and his wife Mathruppillil Lakshmi Amma. She was first married to Punnakkal Easwara Pillai Vicharippukar. Kalyanikutty Amma was a woman of renowned beauty and the first commission given to Raja Ravi Varma by Ayilyam Thirunal was for her portrait. In 1865 after their marriage, she was adopted by the Maharajah into the Nagercoil Ammaveedu after which her full title became Nagercoil Ammachi Panapillai Amma Srimathi Lakshmi Pillai Kalyanikutty Pillai Ammachi. Nagercoil Ammachi was also a scholar of Sanskrit and a poet in her own right, having authored Rasa Krida, Satya Panchakam, Pativrataya Panchakam, Ambarishacharitram and other works. She died in 1909. The Maharajah had no children of his own from either marriage. However along with his consort he adopted two nieces and nephew of hers, one niece Panapillai Ananthalakshmi Pillai Kochamma, who married in 1879 the Maharajah's nephew Moolam Thirunal, the other niece married to a Thirumulpadu and a son Nagercoil Achyuthan Thampi. The Maharajah was also a poet having authored the Meenaketanacharitram and Bhasha Sakuntalam.

The first decade of the Maharajah's reign was happy and peaceful but several problems arose after the dismissal of Dewan Madhava Rao. The Maharajah's relationship with Kerala Varma Valiya Koil Thampuran, the consort of his niece, the Rani Lakshmi Bayi (who was adopted in 1857 soon after the Maharajah's sister of the same name died giving birth to Moolam Thirunal) turned sour and subsequently he was imprisoned in Haripad in 1875 where he stayed until his release in 1880 after the Maharajah's death. Ayilyam Thirunal's own brother, Visakham Thirunal was also on bad terms with him until his death. However, in the last week before his demise, the brothers reconciled. Maharajah Ayilyam Thirunal died on 30 May 1880. The Gazette of Fort St. George of the British Government makes the following comment on the Maharajah's reign:

His Highness ascended the musnud on the 19th of October 1860 and his reign has been marked by the development of wise and enlightened principles of administration which have placed Travancore in the first rank of Native States

== Honours ==
- Knight Grand Commander of the Order of the Star of India (GCSI), 1866
- Prince of Wales Gold Medal, 1875
- Empress of India Gold Medal, 1877
- Companion of the Order of the Indian Empire (CIE), 1878

== See also ==
- Travancore
- Visakham Thirunal
- Moolam Thirunal
- T. Madhava Rao
- Seshayya Sastri
- Travancore Royal Family
- Ammaveedu
- Panapillai Amma

Ayilyam Thirunal Kulasekhara Dynasty Born: 14 March 1832 Died: 30 May 1880
Regnal titles
Preceded by Uthram Thirunal Marthanda Varma	Maharaja of Travancore; 1860–1880	Succeeded by Visakham Thirunal
