= Avittom Thirunal Balarama Varma =

Maharaja of Travancore from 1798 to 1810

- Maharaja of Travancore
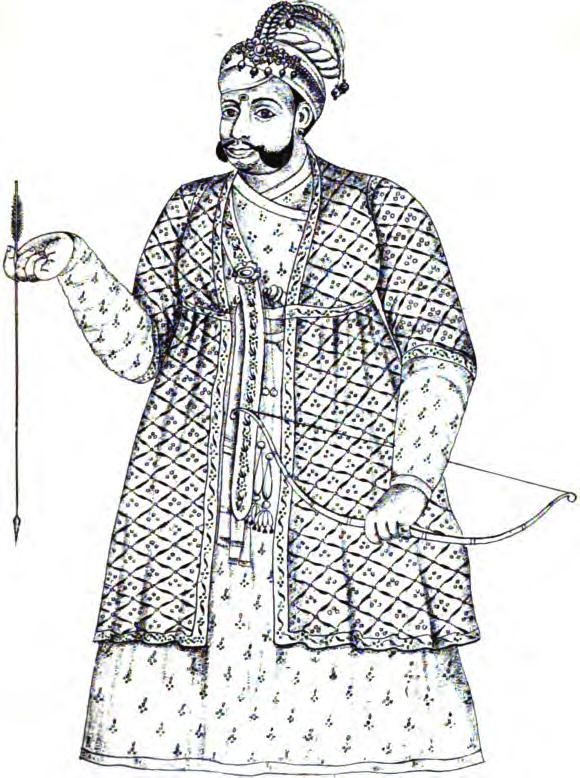
- Reign: 17 February 1798 – 7 November 1810
- Coronation: 18 February 1798
- Predecessor: Dharma Raja
- Successor: Gowri Lakshmi Bayi
- Born: 1782; Attingal
- Died: 7 November 1810 (aged 28)
- Spouse: (Daughter of Dharma Raja)
- Sri Padmanabhadasa Vanchipala Balaramavarma Kulashekhara Kireedapathi Manne Sulthan Maharajarajarama Rajabahadoor Shamsherjang Maharaja
- House: Venad Swaroopam
- Dynasty: Kulasekhara
- Father: Kilimanoor Kochu Koil Thampuran
- Mother: Junior Rani Chathayam Thirunal Atham Bayi
- Religion: Hinduism

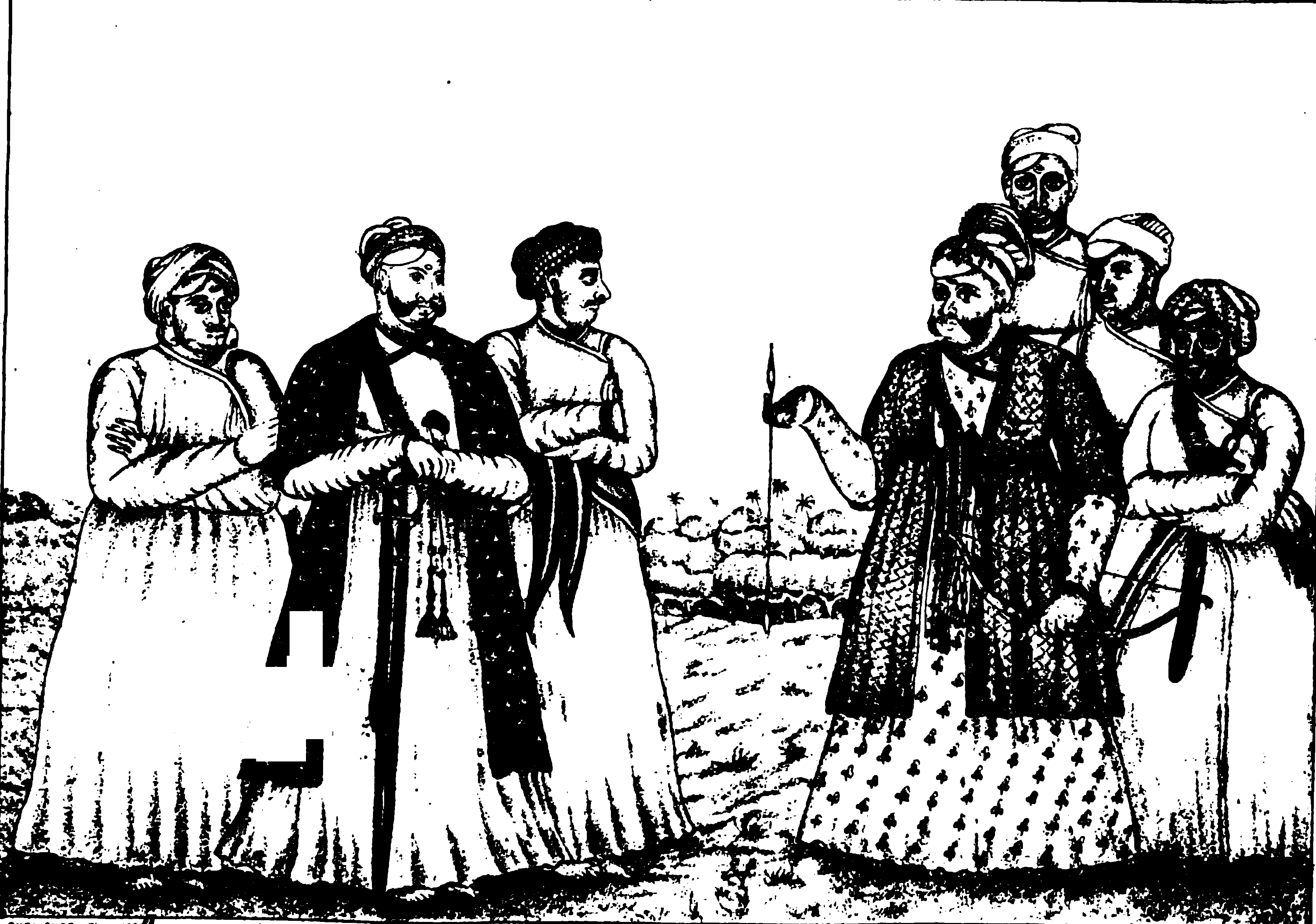
The Maharaja and his attendants

Avittom Thirunal Bala Rama Varma (c. 1782 – 7 November 1810) was a ruler of the Indian princely state of Travancore from 1798 to 1810, succeeding his uncle Maharajah Dharma Raja on 12 February 1798. His reign was a time of disturbances and internal and external problems. The revolt of Velu Thampi (who as Dewan negotiated the formal alliance between Travancore and the British East India Company) occurred during his rule. His great-granddaughter was the wife of Visakham Thirunal. Two ranis were adopted during the reign of Dharma Raja. They were Bharani Thirunal Parvathi Bayi and Uthram Thirunal Umayamma Bayi as the sisters of Avittom Thirunal. These princesses were the daughters of Chathayam Nal Mahaprabha Amma.

Avittom Thirunal Balarama Varma Kulasekhara Dynasty Born: 1782 Died: 1810
Regnal titles
Preceded by Dharma Raja	Maharaja of Travancore; 1798–1810	Succeeded by Gowri Lakshmi Bayi
