= Omanathinkal Kidavo =

Malayalam lullaby composed by Irayimman Thampi

Omanathinkal Kidavo (Malayalam: ഓമന തിങ്കള്‍ കിടാവോ) is a lullaby in Malayalam that was composed by Irayimman Thampi on the birth of Maharajah Swathi Thirunal of Travancore. To date, it remains one of the most popular lullabies in the Malayalam language.

== History ==
The lullaby was composed (1813) by Thampi at the request of the then ruler of Travancore, Maharani Gowri Lakshmi Bayi, to put the baby King Swathi Thirunal to sleep. His birth was a long-awaited event for the royal family since it faced the threat of being annexed into British India under the Doctrine of Lapse for the want of a male heir. The lyrics of the poem reflect this sense of relief when it refers to the baby as a 'treasure from God' and 'the fruit of the tree of fortune'.

In the 1987 movie, Swathi Thirunaal, a portion of this lullaby has been sung by S. Janaki.

A rendition of this lullaby by K.S. Chithra is very popular in Kerala.

== Music ==
Originally composed in the Kurinji raga (melodic mode) and set to Adi tala (metre), it is most often performed in the Navaroj or Nilambari ragas. An interesting feature of this lullaby is that it doesn't mention the word sleep in it. The sleep is thus induced by the effect of the raga. The song lends itself well to the expressions of the navarasas and is therefore often set to dance.

== Lyrics and translation ==
=== Lyrics in Malayalam ===
ഓമനത്തിങ്കള്‍ക്കിടാവോ- നല്ല കോമളത്താമരപ്പൂവോ

പൂവില്‍ നിറഞ്ഞ മധുവോ- പരിപൂര്‍ണേന്ദു തന്‍റെ നിലാവോ

പുത്തന്‍ പവിഴക്കൊടിയോ- ചെറു തത്തകള്‍ കൊഞ്ചും മൊഴിയോ

ചാഞ്ചാടിയാടും മയിലോ - മൃദു പഞ്ചമം പാടും കുയിലോ

തുള്ളുമിളമാന്‍കിടാവോ - ശോഭ കൊള്ളുന്നോരന്നക്കൊടിയോ

ഈശ്വരന്‍ തന്ന നിധിയോ - പരമേശ്വരിയേന്തും കിളിയോ

പാരിജാതത്തിന്‍ തളിരോ - എന്‍റെ ഭാഗ്യദ്രുമത്തിന്‍ ഫലമോ

വാത്സല്യരത്നത്തെ വയ്പ്പാന്‍ - മമ വായ്ച്ചൊരു കാഞ്ചനച്ചെപ്പോ

ദൃഷ്ടിക്കു വച്ചോരമൃതോ - കൂരിരുട്ടത്തു വച്ച വിളക്കോ

കീര്‍ത്തിലതയ്ക്കുള്ള വിത്തോ - എന്നും കേടു വരാതുള്ള മുത്തോ

ആര്‍ത്തിതിമിരം കളവാന്‍ - ഉള്ള മാര്‍ത്താണ്ഡദേവപ്രഭയോ

സുക്തിയില്‍ കണ്ട പൊരുളോ - അതിസൂക്ഷ്മമാം വീണാരവമോ

വമ്പിച്ച സന്തോഷവല്ലി - തന്‍റെ കൊമ്പത്തു പൂത്ത പൂവല്ലി

പിച്ചകത്തിന്‍ മലര്‍ച്ചെണ്ടോ - നാവിനിച്ഛ നല്‍കുന്ന കല്‍ക്കണ്ടോ

കസ്തൂരി തന്‍റെ മണമോ - ഏറ്റ സത്തുക്കൾക്കുള്ള ഗുണമോ

പൂമണമേറ്റൊരു കാറ്റോ - ഏറ്റം പൊന്നില്‍ തെളിഞ്ഞുള്ള മാറ്റോ

കാച്ചിക്കുറുക്കിയ പാലോ - നല്ല ഗന്ധമെഴും പനിനീരോ

നന്മ വിളയും നിലമോ - ബഹുധര്‍മങ്ങള്‍ വാഴും ഗൃഹമോ

ദാഹം കളയും ജലമോ - മാര്‍ഗഖേദം കളയും തണലോ

വാടാത്ത മല്ലികപ്പൂവോ - ഞാനും തേടിവച്ചുള്ള ധനമോ

കണ്ണിനു നല്ല കണിയോ - മമ കൈവന്ന ചിന്താമണിയോ

ലാവണ്യപുണ്യനദിയോ - ഉണ്ണിക്കാര്‍വര്‍ണ്ണന്‍ തന്‍റെ കളിയോ

ലക്ഷ്മീഭഗവതി തന്‍റെ - തിരുനെറ്റിയിലിട്ട കുറിയോ

എന്നുണ്ണിക്കൃഷ്ണന്‍ ജനിച്ചോ - പാരിലിങ്ങനെ വേഷം ധരിച്ചോ

പദ്മനാഭന്‍ തന്‍ കൃപയോ - മുറ്റും ഭാഗ്യം വരുന്ന വഴിയോ

=== Transliteration ===
Omana thinkal kidaavo, nalla komala thaamara poovo

Poovil niranja madhuvo, pari-poornendu thante nilaavo

Puthen pavizha kodiyo, cheru-thathakal konjum mozhiyo

Chaanjaadi aadum mayilo, mridu-panchamam paadum kuyilo

Thullumila maan kidaavo, shobha-kollunnoranna kodiyo

Eeshwaran thanna nidhiyo, Parameshwariyendum kiliyo

Paarijaathathin thaliro, ente bhagya-drumathin phalamo

Vaalsalya raknathe vaippaan, mama vaaichoru kaanchana cheppo

Drishtikku vaichoramrutho, kooriruttathu vaicha vilakko

Keerthi-lathakkulla vitho, ennum kedu varaathulla mutho

Aarthi thimiram kalavaan, ulla maarthaanda deva prabhayo

Sukthiyil kanda porulo, athi sookshmamaam veena-aaravamo

Vambicha santhosha valli, thante kombathu pootha poovalli

Pichakathin malar chendo, naavin-ichha nalkunna kalkando

Kasthuuri thante manamo, etta sathukkalkk-ulla gunamo

PoomaNam-ettooru kaatto, eettam ponnil theLinjulla maatto

Kaachi kuRukkiya paalo, nalla gandhamezhum panineero

Nanma viLayum nilamo, bahu dharmangal vaazhum grihamo

Daaham kalayum jalamo, marga-ghedam kaLayum thanalo

Vaadaatha mallika poovo, njanum thedi vaichulla dhanamo

Kanninu nalla kaniyo, mama kaivanna chinthaa maniyo

Laavanya punya nadiyo, unni kaarvarnan thante kaLiyo

Lakshmi Bhagavathy thante, thiru-nettiyilitta kuriyo

En unnikrishnan Jenicho, paaril ingane vasham dharicho

Pathmanaabhan than kripayo, muttum bhagyam varunna vazhiyo

=== English translation ===
The translation by A. H. Fox Strangways in The Music of Hindoostan is given here:

Is this sweet baby

The bright crescent's moon, or the charming flower of the lotus,

The honey in a flower, or the lustre of the full moon,

A pure coral gem, or the pleasant chatter of parrots,

A dancing peacock, or a sweet singing bird,

A bouncing young deer, or a bright shining swan,

A treasure from God, or the pet parrot in the hands of Īśvarī,

The tender leaf of the kalpa tree, or the fruit of my tree of fortune,

A golden casket to enclose the jewel of my love,

Nectar in my sight, or a light to dispel darkness,

The seed of my climbing fame, or a never-fading bright pearl,

The brilliance of the sun to dispel all the gloom of misery,

The Vedas in a casket, or the melodious vinā,

The lovely blossom put forth by the stout branch of my tree of enjoyment,

A cluster of pichāka buds, or sugar-candy sweet on the tongue,

The fragrance of musk, the best of all good,

A breeze laden with the scent of flowers, or the essence of purest gold,

A bowl of fresh milk, or of sweet smelling rose-water,

The field of all virtue, or an abode of all duty,

A cup of thirst-quenching cold water, or a sheltering shade,

A never-failing mallika flower, or my own stored up wealth,

The auspicious object of my gaze, or my most precious jewel,

A stream of virtuous beauty, or an image of the youthful Krishna,

The bright forehead mark of the goddess Lakshmī,

Or, by the mercy of Padmanābha, is it the source of my future happiness,

Is it, in this beautiful form, an Avatār of Krishna Himself?

== Controversy ==
The Irayimman Thampi Memorial Trust alleged that the first eight lines of the Oscar nominee Bombay Jayashri's song 'Pi's Lullaby' in the film Life of Pi were not an original composition but a translation into Tamil of the Omanathinkal Kidavo. The song had been nominated in the Original Song category for the Oscar Awards of 2013. Jayashri however maintained that she merely wrote what had come to her heart and denied the allegation against her.

Earlier, Jayashri had used Thampi's lullaby in her Album named 'Vatsalyam', released in 2003.
