= Thampi and Thankachi =

Surnames used in Travancore kingdom

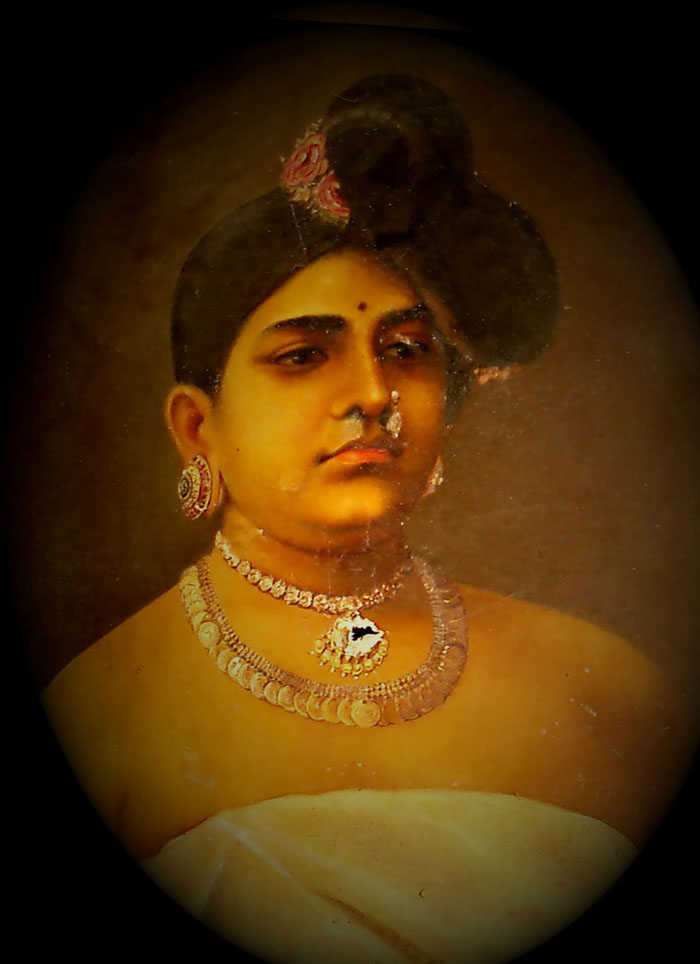
Nagercoil Ammachi, the First Consort of Maharajah Moolam Thirunal of Travancore, painted by P. Mukundan Thampi in 1879

The Thampis and Thankachis are the titles given to the sons and daughters of the Maharajahs of Southern Travancore (Present-day Kanyakumari) and their queen consorts. They belong to the Samanthan Nair caste. The titles "Thampi" and "Thankachi" was also given by the royal families in the region of Padmanabhapuram (Travancore Kingdom) to their Nair relatives. The Thampi surname is also used by certain non-Nair communities, and they have no relation to the aristocratic Nair Thampis.

The very term Thampi and Thankachi means "brother" and "sister" respectively, which indicated the position of the Thampi families as the non-crown inheriting royal relatives of the Royal House of Travancore as per the matrilineal law followed.

The consort of the ruling Maharajah (king) as well as Elayarajah (crown prince) was known as the Ammachi, with the title of Panapillai Amma. To the names of the sons of the Maharajahs was prefixed the title of Sri suffixed with Thampi. The daughters were known as Kochammas. The other members as well as the descendants of the Ammaveedus, however, were simply known as Thampi and Thankachi.

== Origin ==
The Maharajahs of southern Travancore (Kanyakumari district) adopted the matrilineal custom and inheritance prevalent in the land around the 14th Century AD. So basically, the Nair Thampi caste people originated at the original Travancore capital i.e. Padmanabhapuram (present day Kanyakumari district). The Thampi title prevalent mainly in Kanyakumari region of Travancore (old Kerala). The Thampis present in the other parts of Travancore Kingdom i.e. present central Kerala districts like Thampis in Kottayam are people who have since migrated to northern borders of Kingdom after the 17th century. Accordingly, when a king died, his nephew (sister's son) would become the next ruler, and his own son, born of his wife, would be simply called Thampi with the title " Sri (mother's house name) (personal name) Thampi" which was also one of the highest titles of nobility in Travancore. All of the Maharajahs' daughters were known by the style of Kochamma with the title " (mother's house name) Ammaveetil Srimathi (personal name) Pilla Kochamma". Since the Marumakkathayam system of matrilineal inheritance existed in Travancore, the descendants of these individuals would not gain any distinguishing title other than Thampi (male) and Thankachi (female).

== Position ==
The title of Thampi was also rarely given to some families in Travancore by the Maharajah of Travancore, as a reward for exemplary military, social or government services. Thampis indeed had some special social privileges in Travancore. Besides only the Maharajah, they were the only people permitted the use of Palanquins. They also had the right to visit their Royal Cousins, their father's heir as per the Marumakkathayam law, Without formally previously Announcing their visit.

According to a noted expert, in some of the areas on the borders of Travancore and Cochin Kingdom, they formed the third estate colloquially called "Thoruvam Nairs". In the caste hierarchy, they belonged to the Samanthan Nairs subcaste.

== See also ==
- Valiathan
- Irayimman Thampi
- Nair
