= Palkulangara Devi Temple =

Hindu temple in Kerala, India

- Devi Temple, Palkulangara, Thiruvananthapuram, Kerala

Religion
- Affiliation: Hinduism
- District: Thiruvananthapuram
- Deity: Durga
- Governing body: Palkulangara Devi Temple Trust

Location
- Location: Palkulangara, Thiruvananthapuram
- State: Kerala
- Country: India
- Interactive map of Palkulangara Devi Temple
- Coordinates: 8°29′15.0″N 76°56′02.0″E

Architecture
- Type: Traditional Kerala style

Specifications
- Temple: One
- Elevation: 43.89 m (144 ft)

Palkulangara Devi Temple (Malayalam: പാല്‍കുളങ്ങര ദേവി ക്ഷേത്രം) is a Hindu temple in Palkulangara, Thiruvananthapuram, Kerala, India. This place is around 1 km from Pettah junction, 700 m from West Fort junction and 1.5 km from Chakka bypass junction. It is about 1.5 km to the west of Sree Padmanabhaswamy Temple. The temple is under the control of Sree Palkulangara Devi Temple Trust. The temple is an excellent example of Kerala Vasthu Vidya. The abode of Sree Palkulangara Devi is one of the most ancient temples in Kerala. There is also a kavu in the temple.

== History ==
Legend has it that the main deity was installed by Arjuna. After installing the deity, Arjuna sent an arrow to the ground and it made way to a pond of milk, and the milk from the pond was used for Abhisheka. Palkulangara means the banks of the pond of milk (Pal - Milk, Kulam - Pond, Kara - Banks). The pond is in the back of the temple.

== Ancient Recordings ==
This temple is also recorded in the stories of Nala and Damayanti. There is a section in which Nala asks his messenger swan to visit Palkulangara Devi and take the blessings of the Goddess en route to delivering the messages to his lady love Damayanti. The existence of this temple is recorded in many ancient scriptures.

== Deities and Sub-Deities ==
Parvati in her manifestation as Tripura Sundari along with Kali are the main deities in this temple. One important aspect of the temple is that Durga manifests as the Temple Bhagavathi and Kali as Oorutu Amma, both being avatars of Adi Parashakti. Karthika is considered as the star of the deity.

There are many upadevathas (sub-deities) adjacent to the temple, and it has been remade, according to the Deva Prashnam by expert astrologers recently.

The main upadevathas on the premises are:

1. Ganesha
2. Shiva as the All Father.
3. Nagaraja
4. Nagayakshi
5. Ayyappan
6. Brahma Rakshasa
7. Veerabhadra as the brother of the main deity
8. Navagraha
9. Kali as Oorutu Amma, the sister of the main deity

=== Darshan ===
- Morning: 5.30 AM to 10.00 AM
- Evening: 5.00 PM to 8.00 PM

== Festivals ==
The festivals in this temple are:

- Meena Bharani Mahostav — Annual festival that falls in the month of Meenam
- Mandala Vratham — Festival in connection with the annual Utsavam of Sabarimala
- Vinayaka Chathurthi — Pooja to Ganesha
- Pooja Vaypu — Identical to Dussera festival (Saraswathy Pooja and Vidyarambham)
- Karthika — Kazhchakula Samarpanam, Navakabhishekam, Karthika Pongala, Annadhanam (all months)
- Ayilya Pooja — Milk, flowers etc. offered to serpent god and special rites. Monthly Pooja in Ayilyam day except in the months of Mithunam and Karkidakom.
- Ayilyolsavam — Nagaroottu and Sarpabali in the month of Thulam
- Ramayana Parayanam and Bhagavathi Seva — All days of Karkidakom (evening)
- Vavu Bali — In the month of Karkidakom

== See also ==
- Parvathi
- Irumkulangara Durga Devi Temple
- List of Hindu temples in Kerala
- Temples of Kerala
