= Ammachi Panapillai Amma =

Title of the Maharaja consort of Travancore

Ammachi Panapillai Amma was a title introduced after the formation of the Travancore Kingdom. It was held by the consort of the ruling Maharajah of Southern Travancore, as well as those of other title-holding male members of the Travancore Royal Family.

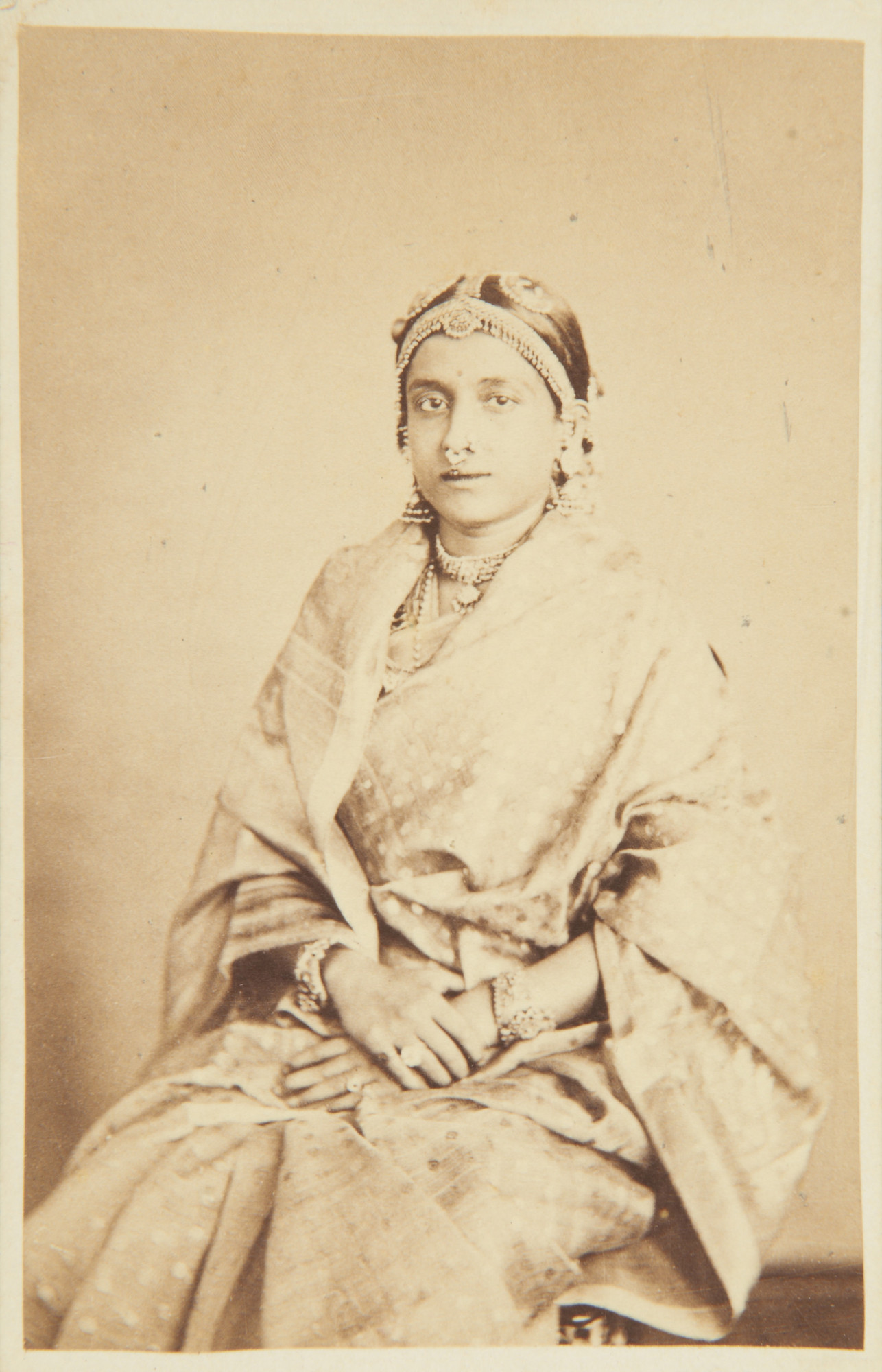
Ammachee, wife of His Highness the Maharaja of Travancore (1868)

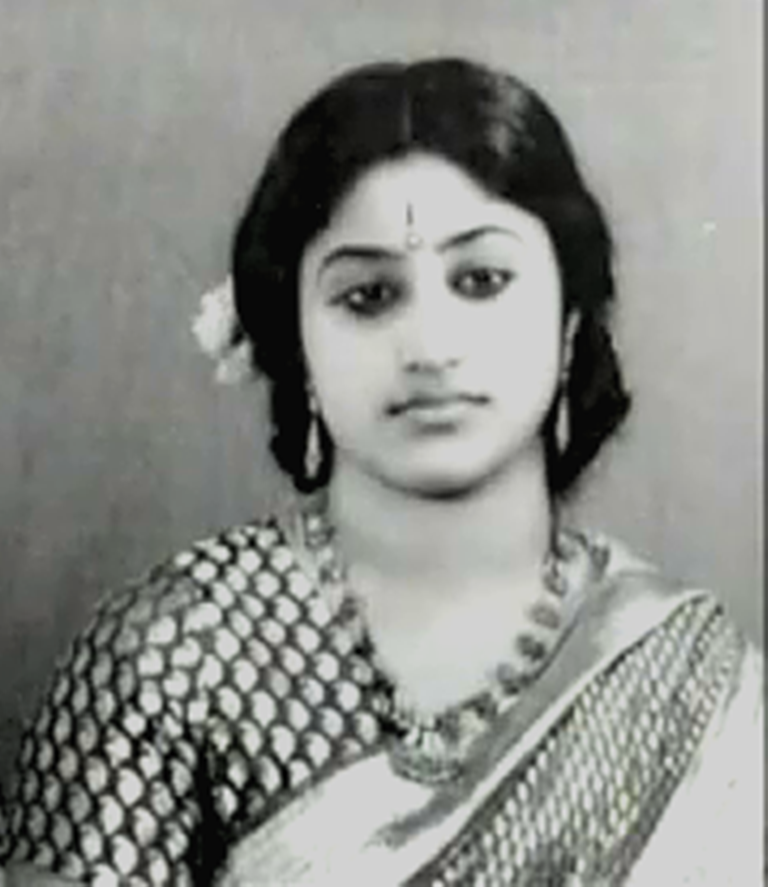
Ammachi Panapillai Amma Shrimathi Radhadevi Pandalai (The consort of Sree Uthradom Thirunal Marthanda Varma), daughter of Parameshwaran Pillai and Parvathi Amma

Its literal translation is 'consort' since as per the formerly existent matriarchal system in Travancore, the Maharajah's sister was the Maharani, and not his wife. Thus the wife, a non-royal, took the title of Ammachi Panapillai Amma.

The Ammachis were mostly from families of the Nair nobility. The Maharajahs married these ladies through the Sambandham form of wedlock known as Pattum Pudavayum.

== Origin ==
The Maharajahs of Travancore (current south Kerala) adopted the Matrilineal custom and inheritance prevalent in the land around the 14th Century AD. Accordingly, when a king died, his nephew (sister's son) would become the next ruler.

== Ammaveedus ==
Families from where Maharajas got married were known as Ammaveedus. It is believed that when the then Travancore King, Maharajah Sree Karthika Thirunal Dharamaraja shifted capital from Padmanabhapuram to Thiruvananthapuram, he brought along his four wives who belonged to the places namely Vadasseri, Nagercoil, Arumana, and Thiruvattar. The new houses, referred to as Ammaveedus (ancestral homes of Ammachis) were constructed in the new capital and were named Arumana Ammaveedu, Vadasseri Ammaveedu, Nagercoil Ammaveedu, Thiruvattar Ammaveedu. The Maharajah also passed a rule that all the Royal male members should only marry from one of the above-mentioned four Ammaveedus. This gave social prominence to the Ammachis as well as their homes.

The Kings of Travancore traditionally took wives from Ammaveedus and the Consorts, known as Ammachis would get the additional title of Panapillai Amma. If at all another lady from outside the Ammaveedu's was to be married to the King, she would be adopted to one of the Ammaveedus first and then wed to the King. This was the case in the marriage of Maharajah Swathi Thirunal, Maharajah Ayilyam Thirunal and Maharajah Moolam Thirunal.

== Social Status ==
Even though Ammachis and her children were held in high social esteem, they had neither any royal rights nor any political power, because of the matrilineal system followed by Royal families. The next Rani (queen) is the sister of Maharaja (King) not his wife. The wife remained outsiders and were not considered as part of Royal family and neither they had any communications with other royal members.
