= Mukilan's invasion of Venad =

Mughal campaign circa 1680

Mukilan (maybe malayalam corruption of Mughal), was a Muslim commander or chieftain who attacked the southern region of Venad during the reign of Umayamma Rani and Kottayam Kerala Varma (1677–1684). He may have attacked the kingdom during the Malayalam Era 855 (AD 1680). This attack is also called Mughal invasion of South Kerala (Travancore).

== Attack of Venad ==
The ruling power of Venad and the control of temples were under the authority of the Nair feudal lords. A minor dispute arose in the southern Venad region between Nair noble families, known as the Ettuveettil Pillais, and Queen Umayamma Rani. Exploiting this situation, the Mukhal planned a sudden invasion through the southern border of Venad, capturing the southern region of Varkala to Kalkulam (present-day Thiruvananthapuram district).

Several historians, including P. Sankunni Menon and others, recorded that the custodians of the Padmanabhaswamy Temple and the eight feudal Nair families of Travancore, known as the Ettuveettil Pillas, locked the temple and had run away fearing caste pollution. Umayamma Rani went to the Nedumangad palace for safety.

For a period, the south of Quilon region (present-day Thiruvananthapuram district) was under the control of a Mughal commander. Although he did not attempt large-scale conversions, this incursion had a significant impact on the culture from the Thovala to Varkala.

== Budhapuram Bhaktadasa Perumal Temple ==
Budhapuram, located in the present day Kalkulam Taluk of Kanyakumari District, is a place sanctified by the penance of Budha for propitiating Goddess Madhukaitabha Nasini (Mahakali). In the 9th century CE, seventy two Yadava families led by Krishna Varman brought idols of Sree Balarama Swamy and Sree Krishna Swamy, and a hallowed Salagrama to Thiruvanananthapuram. They gifted the Sree Krishna idol to the King of Venad who had it installed at the Thiruvambadi Shrine within Sree Padmanabhaswamy Temple. The Balarama idol was gifted to Neythassery Potti, a Brahmin landlord and member of the Ettara Yogam, who constructed a grand temple at Budhapuram. There he consecrated the Balarama idol and a Krishna idol similar to the one in the aforesaid Thiruvambadi Shrine. Certain rituals were ordained in the Temple for Goddess Madhukaitabha Nasini as well. In the course of time, Lord Balarama and Lord Krishna of this Temple came to be known as Bhaktadasa Perumal and Rugmininatha Perumal respectively.

As Mukilan made his entry into the southern parts of Travancore, the idols of Budhapuram were shifted to some secure place. Though Nairs and Channans put up a brave front, they fell before the onslaught of Mukilan's bands which destroyed the majestic Temple.

== Defeat of Mukilan ==
Umayamma Rani requested the help of Kottayam Kerala Varma. He raised a new force with the support of scattered Nair nobles and warriors across Venad, who were armed with swords, lances, bows, arrows and slings. Kerala Varma personally led the Nair army against the Mughal forces, launching a surprise attack at Manacaud, the base of Mughals. Since the Mughals did not have a sufficient force—having scattered their horsemen between Varkala and Thovalai to collect revenue—they were unable to stand their ground and were forced to retreat hastily to Thovalai.

During the conflict, many horsemen were killed. At one point, a stone thrown from a sling disturbed a nest of wasps in a tree where the Mughal commander was fighting. The wasps descended in swarms, stinging the commander on his face, causing him to fall. The fallen chief was soon killed by the archers, leading to the defeat of his army. Kottayam Kerala Varma succeeded in securing around three hundred horses and approximately one hundred prisoners, along with many swords, lances, and other weapons from the defeated forces.

== Aftermath ==
Venad regained the lands occupied by the Mughal chieftain. Kottayam Kerala Varma organised a battalion of cavalry with the captured horses and brought all the rebellious feudatories under his control. He then acted as the queen's principal counsellor and commander of the troops of Venad. Umayamma Rani elevated him to the position of heir apparent. Subsequently, misunderstandings arose between her and the heir apparent and it is believed that he was assassinated. According to historian Abhinav Madhav, this battle strengthens the Venad Kingdom and led to the strong basement of modern Travancore kingdoms conquests led by Marthanda Varma.

== See also ==
- Battle of Nedumkotta
- Mysorean invasion of Malabar
- Malabar rebellion
