= Kanjirottu Yakshi =

Folkloric vampire

Kanjirottu Yakshi is a folkloric deity of South India. According to the myth, she was born into the Mangalathu family at Kanjiracode in Southern Travancore (now in Tamil Nadu). Also known as Chiruthevi, she was a beautiful courtesan who had an intimate relationship with Raman Thampi, son of King Rama Varma and rival of Anizhom Thirunal Marthanda Varma. She turned into a Yakshi after being murdered by her palanquin-bearer, waylaying men with her beauty and drinking their blood.

According to local folklore, Chiruthevi was not just a courtesan but a woman of immense influence in the royal courts of Southern Travancore. Her transformation into a Yakshi (a celestial or supernatural being) is said to have occurred due to the extreme "marana-vedana" (death-throes) and the betrayal she felt at the time of her murder. Legend says she initially resided in a massive Kanjiram (Strychnine tree), from which the name "Kanjirottu" is derived.

The story is closely intertwined with the political turmoil of 18th-century Travancore. Her partner, Raman Thampi, was one of the Ettuveetil Pillamar (Lords of the Eight Houses) who opposed the rise of Anizhom Thirunal Marthanda Varma. In local narratives, the Yakshi's vengeful spirit was believed to have played a role in the supernatural myths surrounding the struggles between the King and the rebels.

Unlike many malevolent spirits in folklore, Kanjirottu Yakshi eventually attained a form of "Moksha" (liberation). Folklore states that, she sought refuge in the Sree Padmanabhaswamy Temple. Today, she is worshipped in a small shrine (Thekkedom) within the temple complex, where she is seen as a protector deity who has traded her thirst for blood for spiritual devotion.

== Folkloric Background ==
Sreedevi or Chiruthevi was a courtesan who had as her clients the high and the mighty, and who enjoyed toying with the lives of her many admirers and driving them to financial ruin. However, she fell in love with Kunjuraman, her palanquin-bearer, who would carry both her and her brother Govindan around on his back. However, Kunjuraman was already married and did not reciprocate Chiruthevi's feelings. On the other hand, Govindan and Kunjuraman were very close, with some versions of the tale claiming that the two were lovers.

Frustrated by Kunjuraman's romantic indifference towards her, Chiruthevi arranged for Kunjuraman's wife to be killed. When Govindan found out that his sister was behind the plot, he told Kunjuraman, who agreed to sleep with Chiruthevi. While they were in bed, Kunjuraman strangled Chiruthevi in order to avenge the murder of his wife.

Following her murder, Chiruthevi was reborn as a yakshi to a couple in Kanjirottu. She magically transformed into a bewitchingly beautiful woman moments after her birth. As a yakshi, she proceeded to seduce and terrorize men and drink their blood, never forgetting to harass the still-living Kunjuraman, whom she still desired. To help Kunjuraman, Govindan, who was also a great upasaka of Lord Balarama, made a deal with the yakshi whereby she could cohabit with Kunjuraman for a year, after which she was to become a devotee of Narasimha. The other conditions of this deal were that she must agree to be installed at a temple after the year was up, and that she must pray for Govindan and his relationship with Kunjuraman in this birth and all subsequent ones. The yakshi swore on 'ponnum vilakkum' in agreement, and after the year was up, she was installed at a temple in Kanjiracode which got destroyed many years later.

== Sri Padmanabhaswamy Temple ==
After becoming a devotee of Narasimha, the Yakshi is now believed to reside in Vault (or 'Kallara' in Malayalam) B of the ancient Sri Padmanabhaswamy Temple in Thiruvananthapuram, Kerala. References to the temple have appeared in literature dating back to the Sangam era, though nobody is certain of when it was constructed. It is currently managed by the royal family of Travancore. Vault B is one of six vaults of the temple, five of which were opened in 2011 following an order by the Supreme Court of India. A horde of gold and jewels estimated to be worth over US$20 billion, one of the largest treasure troves in the world, was revealed. However, Vault B remains unopened due to ongoing legal issues, as well as the legend that suggests that while even bigger treasures lie within the vault, any attempt to open it would stir up the Kanjirottu Yakshi, interrupting her prayers to Lord Narasimha and unleashing her evil upon the world. As Princess Aswathi Thirunal Gowri Lakshmi Bayi observes, "Disturbing her peace would be a disaster especially if her current quiet temperament reverts to the menacing nature that was once hers." The enchanting and ferocious forms of this Yakshi are painted on the south-west part of Sri Padmanabha's shrine.

In July 2020, the Supreme Court of India upheld the rights of the Travancore royal family to manage the Temple. The royal family has maintained that they oppose the opening of Vault B, stating that it is a "secret and sacred place." According to the July 2020 ruling, the decision to open Vault B or leave it undisturbed stands with the advisory and administrative committees appointed to help manage the Temple.

== Sundara Lakshmi Pillai ==
Sundara Lakshmi Pillai Ammachi, an accomplished dancer and consort of Maharaja Swathi Thirunal Rama Varma, was an ardent devotee of Kanjirottu Yakshi Amma.

== See also ==
- Yakshini
