= Rama Varma of Venad =

Ruler of the Indian kingdom of Venad from 1724 to 1729

Rajah Rama Varma was the ruler of the Indian kingdom of Venadu, later known as Travancore, in the modern day state of Kerala, India between 1724 and 1729, having succeeded his brother Aditya Varma. He is better known as the uncle of Marthanda Varma, the "maker of modern Travancore". He was born into the royal Venadu Samanta Kshatriya family, and his maternal lineage was adopted from the Royal Family of Kolathunadu who held the status of Samantan from Mushika line, and therefore according to the Marumakkathayam custom the family originally held only Samanthan status. They later performed the Hiranyagarbha ritual to attain the Kshatriya (Samanta Kshatriya) status equivalent to that of the early rulers of Quilon, the Kulashekara Perumals. He was the second son of Rajah Ittamar of Thattari Kovilakam, who in turn belonged to the Parappanadu Royal Family.

It was princes from the Parappanadu family who customarily married Kolathunadu princesses. Rama Varma's entire family, including himself, four sisters and his elder brother Aditya Varma, were adopted into the Venad house as members of the Travancore Royal Family by Rajah Ravi Varma, son of Umayamma Rani due to the failure of heirs there. Ittammar Raja's sister and her sons, Rama Varma and Raghava Varma (who were descendants of Parappanadu due to marumakkathayam), settled in Kilimanoor and married the now adopted sisters. Of the adopted sisters, one died soon after her adoption while the other was the mother of the Maharajah Marthanda Varma.

== Reign ==
Rajah Rama Varma was a weak ruler during whose reign the Ettuveetil Pillamar, the Ettara Yogam and other nobles had more power than the King himself, as had been the case since the middle of the 17th century. However, on the advice of Marthanda Varma, the Rajah signed a treaty of subordination with the Madurai Nayak dynasty and secured a Vatuka force in Venad. This frightened the disloyal nobles for sometime, who now, however, turned their attention towards killing Marthanda Varma, the heir apparent under the Marumakkathayam law. Previously, the Ettuveetil Pillamar had been responsible for the assassination of prince Kerala Varma.

== The Kunju Thampimar ==
The Rajah Rama Varma had married a princess known as Abhirami alias Shrimathi Avirama Kochamma from whom he had issue, two sons, Padmanabhan and Raman Thampi, known as the Kunju Thampimar and a daughter Ummini Thankachi. On the demise of the Rajah in 1729, Maharajah Marthanda Varma succeeded to the throne under the Marumakkathayam law of inheritance.

However, the succession of their cousin to their father's throne, infuriated the Kunju Thampimar (because their mother was from a caste that didn't follow matriliny, they thought they will succeed their father) who allied themselves with the Ettuveetil Pillamar, Marthanda Varma's foes. On their instigation, the Thampi brothers proceeded to Trichonopoly and succeeded in making the nayak government there believe that Marthanda Varma was a usurper and that they were the rightful heirs to the throne of Venad. The Madurai nayak Government deputed a Commander known as Azhagappa Mudaliar to install the Kunju Thampimar in Venad and punish Marthanda Varma. However the Mudaliar was bribed by the King, and the Thampi brothers were severely reprimanded for their actions.

Soon after this, in 1733, the Thampi brothers made a visit to their cousin while he was at Nagercoil Palace where they were both killed by Marthanda Varma. While the traditional accounts state that they attempted to assassinate Marthanda Varma and were hence killed, it is not clear as to why their sister Ummini Thankachi was also killed by Marthanda Varma. There is also another local legend that she committed suicide following the killings of her brothers. Thus the sons of Rajah Rama Varma were vanquished and Marthanda Varma became the Rajah of Venad which he expanded into modern Travancore.

== See also ==
- Travancore
- Venad
- Marthanda Varma
- The Kunju Thampimar
- Marumakkathayam
- Kanjirottu Yakshi
- Marthandavarma (novel)

Rama Varma of Venad Kulasekhara Dynasty Born: 16- Died: 1729
Regnal titles
Preceded by Unni Kerala Varma (as Raja of Venad)	Raja of Venad; 1721–1729	Succeeded by Marthanda Varma
