= Umayamma Rani =

Regent of Venad

Aswathi Thirunal Umayamma
- Attingal Mootha Thampuran
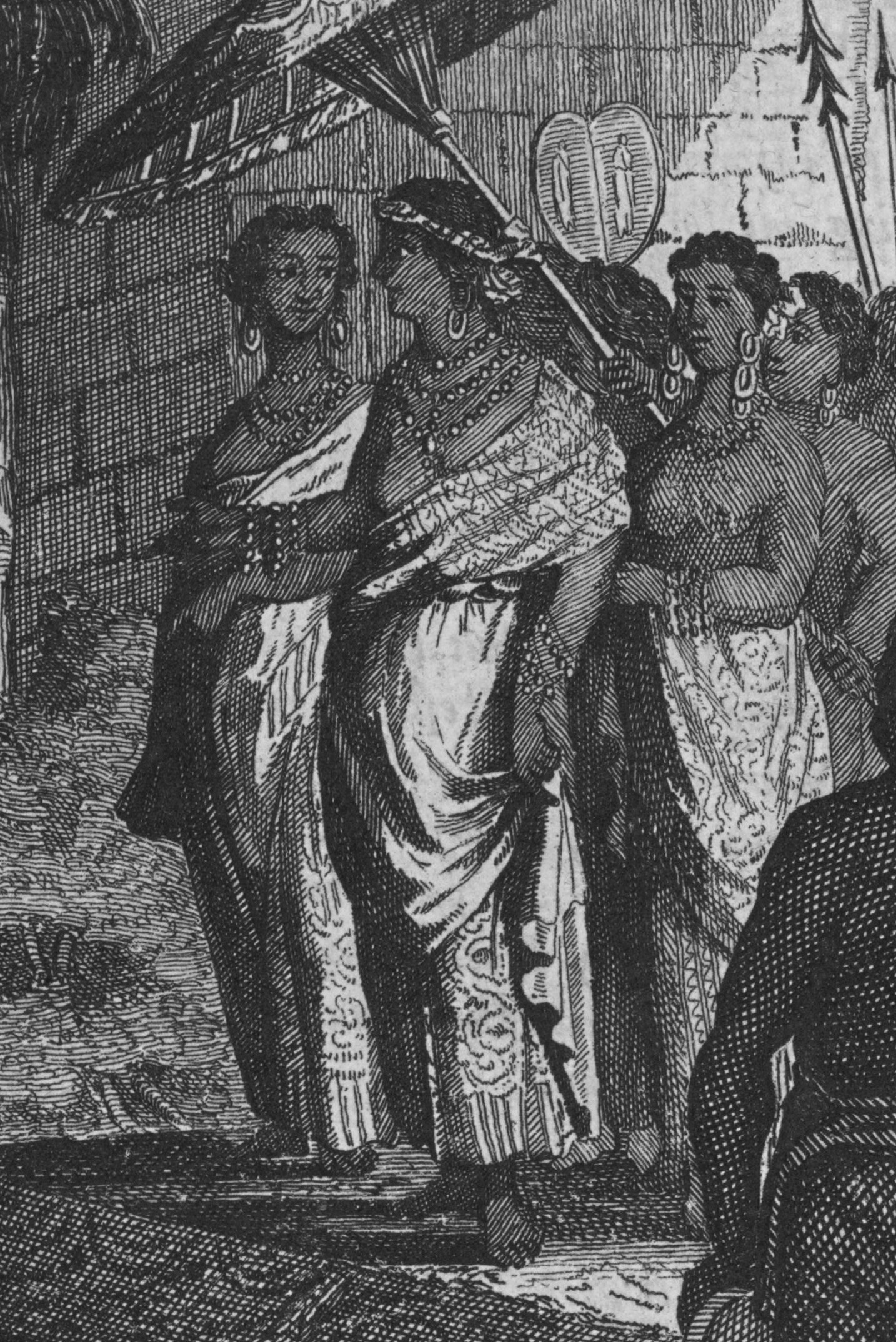
- Queen Umayamma

Regent of Venad
- Regency: 1677 - 1684
- Predecessor: Atham Thirunal Aditya Varma (as King)
- Successor: Karthika Thirunal Ravi Varma (as King)

Queen of Attingal
- Reign: ? - 1678 (as junior queen); 1678 - 1698 (as senior queen)
- Predecessor: Makayiram Thirunal
- Successor: Princess adopted in 1688
- Died: Valiyathura
- Issue: (All adopted) Karthika Thirunal Ravi Varma, Aditya Varma, Rama Varma, Karthika Thirunal Umayamma
- House: Attingal Swarupan of the House of Kupaka
- Religion: Hinduism

"Aswathi Thirunal" Umayamma, known as Queen Umayamma or Queen Ashure (Aswathi), (died 1698), was the regent queen of Venad (Venatu) in southern India from 1677 to 1684 on behalf of her young nephew (son of her older sister Senior Queen Makayiram Thirunal) Ravi Varma. She also served as the Junior Queen of Attingal under Senior Queen Makayiram Thirunal and subsequently as the Senior Queen of Attingal.

While Ravi Varma ruled as the king of Trippapoor (1684-1718), Umayamma continued retention of the sovereign power over his swaroopam. She was able to negotiate independently with the English and Dutch factors in Kerala. The English East India Company secured factory sites at Vilinjam (Brinhjohn), and Ruttera (either Valiyathura or Vettoor) from Umayamma in 1688. Permission to construct a fort at Anjengo was secured from the queen in 1694. Umayamma also concluded an agreement with the Danes at Edava, near Attingal

Queen Umayamma built the administrative foundation on which her grandson Marthanda Varma built modern Travancore. Dutch commander Henrik van Rheede (who met Umayamma in 1677) writing in 1694, concludes that Attingal could summon an army of 30,000 men at the time. Umayamma died in 1698 in Valiyathura.

== Background ==
Collateral branches of Venad ruling family exercised independent authority in their domains. They were Elayadathu Swaroopam (Kottarakara, Desinganad Swaroopam (Quilon), and Peraka Thavazhi (Nedumangad). Besides, even within the limited domains of the Trippappoor branch, by 17th century, factions were rife due to the refractory Nair nobles (madampis), most powerful of whom were the Barons of the Eight Houses. The Association of Eight and Half (the Ettara Yogakkar) also wielded considerable power in the state machinery.

=== Queens of Attingal ===
During the 14th century, the Trippappoor ruling family was forced to adopt two female members from the Kolathunad ruling family (northern Kerala). A royal residence was constructed at Attingal (Chittatinkara), for the residence of the two princiesses, and they were installed as Senior and Junior Queens of Attingal ("Attingal Mootha Thampuran" and "Attingal Elaya Thampuran"). The land around Attingal was assigned to them, and the revenue derived therefrom was placed at their disposal.

The eldest princess of the Trippappoor ruling family was known as "the (Senior) Queen of Attingal". Only the Senior Queen of Attingal was allowed to hold the throne at Attingal whether any adult male existed or not. Trippappoor Swaroopam was usually ruled by her male heir (son, brother or cousin). The spouse of the king of Trippappoor was not allowed to hold the title "Queen", and thus the Queen of Attingal was the senior queen of Trippappoor.

As per historian P. S. Menon, in all Kerala, there was no "Queen-Mother" who possesses so much influence in public affairs as in Attingal. The queen controlled a large territory of her own independent of Trippappoor. The Queen of Attingal was also allowed to reign as full sovereigns in the Trippapoor (Travancore) and Desinganad (Kollam) branches of Venad in the absence of male heirs. By the time of Umayamma, the seat of the Attingal queen was sufficiently strong to intervene in the internal affairs of the Trippappoor Swaroopam. The king of Trippappoor was seen as a vassal of Queen Umayamma in the late 17th century.

The Queens of Attingal had independent warriors under their control, and personally led them into battles. In the 16th century, the Queen of Kollam also had considerable political and economical independence. Some of the treaties between Venad and the Portuguese were signed by the Queen of Kollam. It is known that the Queen of Kollam, in alliance with the Queen of Attingal, also carried out military campaigns against the Portuguese. In a military campaign against the Trippappoor, the Queen of Attingal is believed to have joined forces with her cousin (Queen of Kollam) in Kollam.

== As the regent of Trippappoor ==
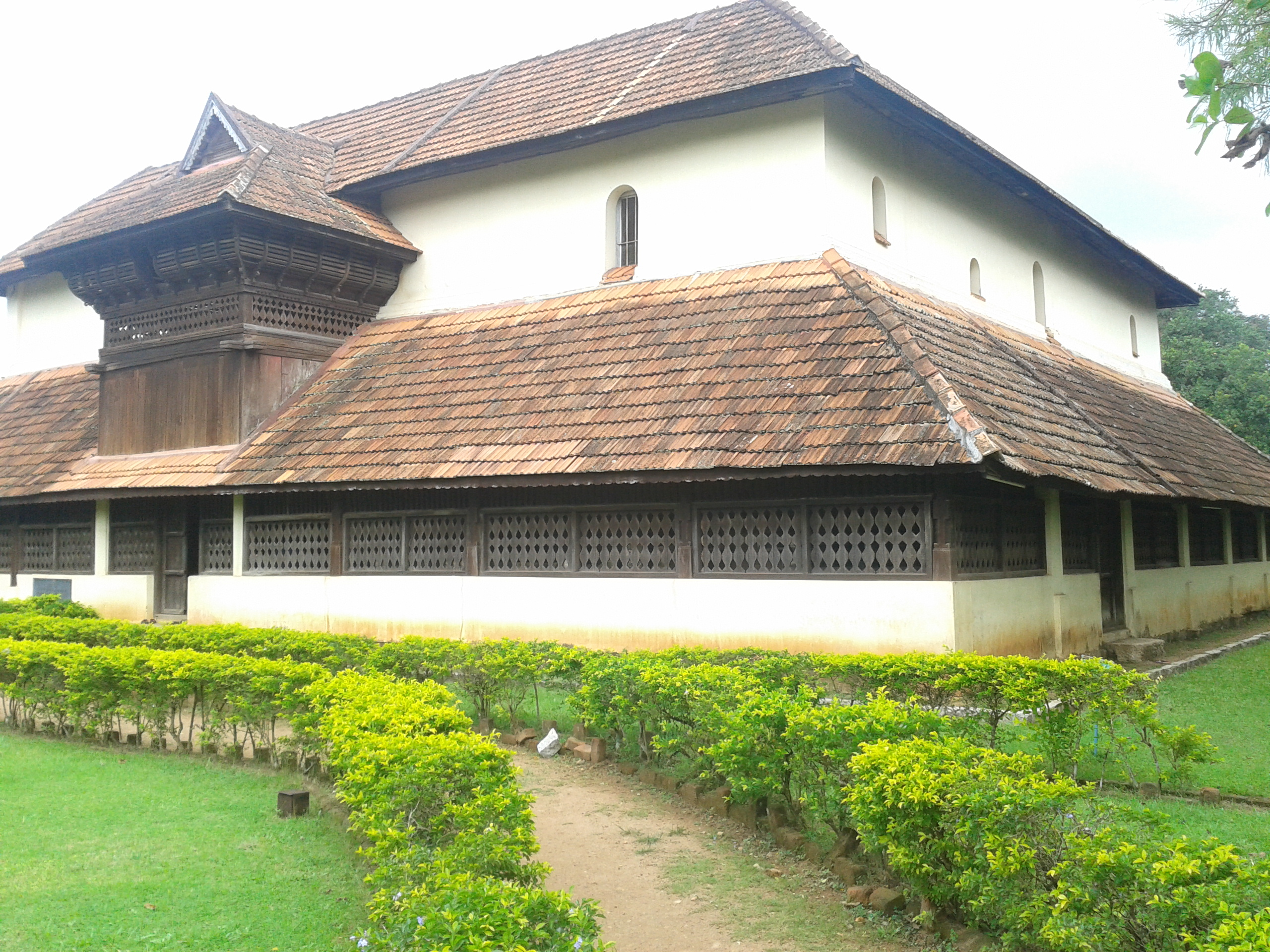
Koyikkal Palace

Umayamma, the Junior/Second Queen of Attingal, was the niece (a daughter of brother or sister) of Venad king Aditya Varma. Excluding the collateral branches, the other important members of the royal family at the time were Makayiram Thirunal, the Senior Queen of Attingal, and her young son, Ravi Varma.

The polity of Venad was in a state of turmoil in the late-17th century. The predecessor of Umayamma, Aditya Varma (d. 1677), had been adopted from the Vallarapalli "branch" of the ruling family of Cochin to Trippappoor Swaroopam in 1630, thereby offending the claims of the "collateral branches" of the Venad family to the throne.

In 1674 an adoption had to be made and king Aditya Varma favoured his sister's son Vallarapalli Rama Varma. Nedumangad Vira Kerala Varma put forward the claims of his younger brother against the proposed adoption. In order to prevent an adoption from Nedumangad, Umayamma supported Aditya Varma. Rama Varma was accordingly adopted by the Senior Queen. In 1677 Aditya Varma died, and his successor Ravi Varma was still a minor. Umayamma (Second Queen of Attingal) took charge as regent with the approval of the Senior Queen.

Umayamma re-established regular performance of pujas in Sri Padmnabhaswami Temple at Thiruvananthapuram, after a gap of five years, in 1678. She also known to have renovated the Agasteeswaran Temple.

Henrik van Rheede, the Dutch Governor in Ceylon, met with Umayamma in 1677 AD:

The Senior Queen of Attingal, who is not alone the mother of the prince of Trippappur but the eldest of the entire royal family has a territory of her own, independent of Travancore, which was in alliance with the Company. Along with the Senior Queen of Attingal lives a younger one (Junior Queen Umayamma), but of such noble and manly conduct that she is both feared and respected by everyone, some out of respect to her sex and other out of regard to the senior princess, which this Junior Queen knows so well how to turn to her advantage, that she not only rules Attingal but Trippappur itself within whose bounds no princess may set her feet according to their law, nor pass the river Karamana on pain of forfeiting their rights, but this young Amazon (Junior Queen Umayamma) has lately violated those customs and made even the (Trippappoor) king fly before her...

As per P. S. Menon, Aditya Varma was assassinated by the Barons of the Eight Houses and the Association of Eight and Half (the Ettara Yogakkar). Umayamma (the only female member in the royal family as per Menon) was residing in a mud fort complex called Puthenkotta, on the western side of the river Killiar, at the time. She had six sons of whom five were also killed by the Barons of the Eight Houses. Her nine-year-old son - not her nephew - Ravi Varma was crowned as the ruler of Venad, and Umayamma became Queen regent of Venad (1677). The regent and her son later shifted to Koyikkal Palace, Nedumangad. However, according to the records of the Padmanabhaswamy Temple in Thiruvananthapuram and other sources, some historians have challenged the version given by Menon and claim that Umayamma did not have any children at all. Similarly the story of the poisoning of Aditya Varma, the predecessor to Umayamma, has also been challenged and it is now assumed that he died a natural death in 1677 at Darpakulangara Palace.

=== Response of Nedumangad ===
"Queen Umayamma came to prominence by the management of Trippappoor Swaroopam. Her first task was to improve the finances of the state. There were no proper accounts. Arrears accumulated, collections disappeared, and debts increased. She ordered the preparation of the accounts of every village in Trippappoor. By insisting upon proper accounts and the strict collection of all arrears and current dues, she converted the deficit into a surplus, and provided regular income for the Trippappoor. All those who had misappropriated the public money were compelled to refund it, and punished according to the gravity of their offence. It seems that the Senior Queen never did anything which was not approved by Umayamma'.

— K. V. Krishna Ayyar. "A Short History of Kerala" (1966)

In 1672, Umayamma adopted two boys, namely Rama Unni Pandarathil of Vallarapalli and Rama Koyil. Most of the nobles, and barons who lost or had lose by the new administration joined with Nedumangad Vira Kerala Varma. Vira Kerala Varma allying with the Kottarakara branch (Elayadathu Muttavar), and the warriors of Kalakkad Chidambaranatha Pillai, advanced against Umayamma at Thiruvananthapuram via Kalkulam and Neyyattinkara. Queen's warriors opposed them at Karamana and under cover of this engagement she withdrew to Varkala and then to Attingal. Vira Kerala was able to capture Kalkulam in July, 1677.

Makayiram Thirunal, the Senior Rani of Attingal, died in 1678 AD, and Umayamma succeeded as Senior Queen of Attingal. She adopted a prince (Aditya Varma) and two princesses from the Kolathunad. Vira Kerala Varma was soon defeated by Umayamma at Nemam and Edakkode, and took up her quarters at Kalkkulam. Immediately Vira Kerala surrounded the fort. She however made preparations for attacking Nedumangad and sent orders to her warriors at Attingal to invade it. Vira Kerala left Kalkulam to defend his swaroopam.

Kerala Varma, invited by Umayamma from the Kottayam royal family of northern Kerala, was adopted into the royal family during this time. He was given the title of "Prince of Hiranyanallur" and was then appointed as the queen's principle counsellor, and commander of all the militia then on the side of the queen.

=== Incursion by the Muslim adventurer ===
In 1680 Nanjanad (southern Travancore) was overrun by the troops (known locally as Mughilin pada- mughal army) led by a Muslim general (whose name has been lost). He marched into Travancore via the Aromboli Pass and became the ruler of the country between Thovala and Edava on the coast line of Travancore. He reached suburbs of Thiruvananthapuram and camped at Manacaud. The Barons of the Eight Houses and the Association of Eight and Half (the Ettara Yogakkar) fled to safety. Umayamma herself fled Thiruvananthapuram and sought refuge at Nedumangad. The Muslim forces were eventually beaten back by the forces led by Kottayam Kerala Varma. Pursuing the Mughilin Pada, Kerala Varma and his army caught up with them and engaged in battle with them at Thiruvattar. The Mughilin Pada was defeated and their Sardar killed in the battle. Umayamma and Ravi Varma safely returned to Thiruvananthapuram. Soon Umayamma publicly declared that the Nedumangad had no claim to the Trippappoor throne.

Kerala Varma took the reins of Trippappoor into his hands. The Barons and the Ettara Yogam were cowed under the new system. Two palaces were constructed in Thiruvananthapuram called Tevarathu Koikkal and Valia Koikkal for the residence of Umayamma and Kerala Varma. It is said that the Barons and the temple trustees (Ettara Yogam) assassinated Kerala Varma in front of Valiya Koikkal. He was returning from the palace of Umayamma at night after an interview. It also seems that some misunderstandings also arose between Kerala Varma and Queen Umayamma towards the end of the former's life. As per historian K. V. K. Ayyar, Umayamma and Kerala Varma must have been responsible for the removal of "Pulappedi" and "Mannappedi" in 1696. When in 1693 one branch of the family became extinct, Umayamma did not allow the king of Trippappoor annex that swaroopam but subjugated it herself. In 1696 she even carried another offensive military campaign into Trippappoor Swaroopam.

As early as 1680s, rumours circulated that the Madurai rulers intended to invade Travancore in order to forcibly collect arrears in tribute. Travancore was a nominal tributary of the Madurai at the time. In an attempt to deal with the Barons of the Eight Houses, Umayyamma invoked the assistance of the Madurai pradhani. In late 1685, the Madurai pradhani Tiruvenkatanatha Ayya invaded Travancore with a large body of troops. In fact, this incursion was to be the precursor of an almost annual invasion of southern Travancore by Madurai forces after 1689 (via Kottar or the Aramboli Pass).

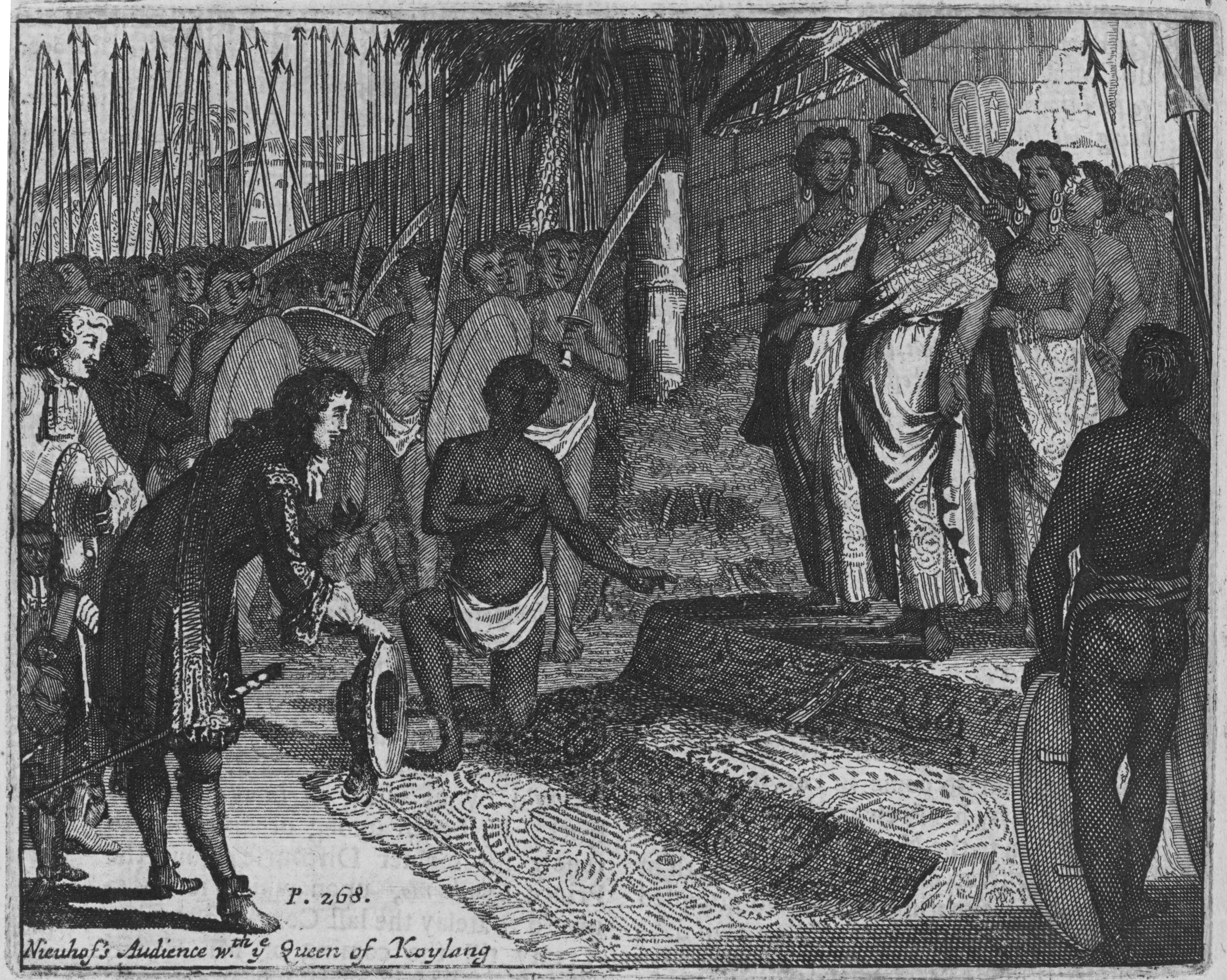
Nieuhof's audience with the "Queen of Koylang" (1662).

Meanwhile, 16-year-old Ravi Varma (son of Makayiram Thirunal) was given sovereignty as the king of Trippappoor in 1684. In 1688 Ravi Varma adopted two princes - Unni Kerala Varma and Rama Varma - and two princesses from Kolathunad. Ravi Varma ruled from 1684 to 1718. Umayamma died in 1698 in Valiyathura. Soon after her death, the king of Trippappoor granted the Company of the privilege of minting currency (which she had withheld for decades).

=== Relations with the Dutch and English ===
Commercial relation had already existed between the Trippappoor Swaroopam and the Dutch or the English. As early as 1644, the English Company obtained permission from the king of Trippappoor to build a factory at Vilinjam. In December 1658 the Dutch captured the Portuguese fort of Quilon and in January 1659 concluded a treaty with the Queen of Quilon. But the garrison left behind by Rijcklof van Goens had to be withdrawn because of local and Portuguese resistance. With aid of the Zamorin of Calicut and his allies, the Dutch recaptured Quilon in December 1661. In 1662 they signed agreements with the ruler of Quilon and the king of Travancore reinstating the treaty of 1569. By the March 1662 treaty with the king of Travancore, the Dutch obtained the monopoly of pepper and cinnamon trade. The treaty also provided for the expulsion of the Portuguese from Travancore. After the capture of Quilon, Johann Nieuhof was appointed as the governor of Dutch Quilon. He was later delegated by James Hustaert with the task of negotiating alliances with the Queen of Quilon.

Beginning in the 1670s, the English Company began to pursue plans for a sovereign enclave in Trippapoor. In 1678, the English Company was invited by the Queen of Attingal to open a factory in her territory. She wrote to the Company offering trade in Attingal. Next year, the factory broker Verdamon Beca, was sent to her with a letter for the purpose of making inquiries as to the resources of Attingal for supplying spices. In 1687, Captains John Shaxton and Richard Clifton were sent to "treat with the Queen and Government about fortifying".

The English company selected two factory sites at Vilinjam (Brinhjohn/Brinjohn or Brinjone/Brinjaon), and Ruttera/Retturah/Retorah (either Valiathura or Vettoor) in 1688. Daniel Acworth was appointed as chief factor at Ruttera. Captain John Brabourne was sent to found the factory at Vilinjam.

The "two small factories" functioned for some time (1688 - c.1696) until the queen cancelled the lease.

Umayamma wrote;

...they [the English] were troublesome to my people and therefore I ordered that they should go from there and make no more contracts in my land

==== Fort Anjengo ====
In 1693, Acworth and Brabourn reopened negotiations with the Queen. Permission to construct a settlement and fort at Anjengo (Anchuthengu) was secured from Umayamma by Brabourne on 29 July 1694. She granted permission to fortify Anjengo provided the English settlement at Vilinjam should be withdrawn and that the English would contract to purchase all the pepper Attingal produced and pay 2.5% on all goods imported and exported with a present of 75 Venetian sequins. The treaty also included a clause that allowed Attingal to "appropriate 50% of any booty recovered from shipwrecks nearby".

Because the English I called hither have always been obedient to me, I do hereby grant unto them the following privileges; I give unto them the hill of the louges that is at Anjengo, to fortify with stone and to abide there for ever; And I will send thither my officers to set forth and appoint with land marks the limits of the land that belong unto me.

The construction of the fort was completed in the mid-1690s.

In 1695 Umayamma agreed to supply all her pepper to the English Company, only to withdraw from the contract and give it away to the Danes by a deal (1695) concluded with them at Edava, near Attingal. When the English Company strengthened the defences of Fort Anjengo without Attingal's sanction, she attempted to unite a military alliance against them. In November 1697, she sent a sizable force to evict the factors from Anjengo, but the attack was easily repelled by the English. Earlier in 1695 Umayamma had already gone to war against the Dutch and destroyed Fort Tengapattanam.

== Personality of Umayamma ==
The Dutch representative Nieuhoff describes Queen Umayamma as:

... I was introduced into her majesty's presence. She had a guard of above seven hundred Nair soldiers about her, all clad after the Malabar (Kerala) fashion; the queen's attire being no more than a piece of callicoe (calico) wrapt around her middle, the upper part of her body appearing for the most part naked, with a piece of calico hanging carelessly round her shoulders. Her ears, which were very long, her neck and arms were adorned with precious stones, gold rings and bracelets and her head covered with a piece of white calico. She was past her middle age, of a brown complexion, with black hair tied in a knot behind, but of majestic mien, she being a princess who shew'd a great deal of good conduct in the management of her affairs

== See also ==
- Marthanda Varma
- Travancore
- Attingal

Umayamma Rani Kulasekhara dynasty of Venad
Regnal titles
Preceded by Aditya Varma	Regent of Venad (Attingal Queen); 1677-1684	Succeeded by Ravi Varma
