= Methan mani =

Methan Mani
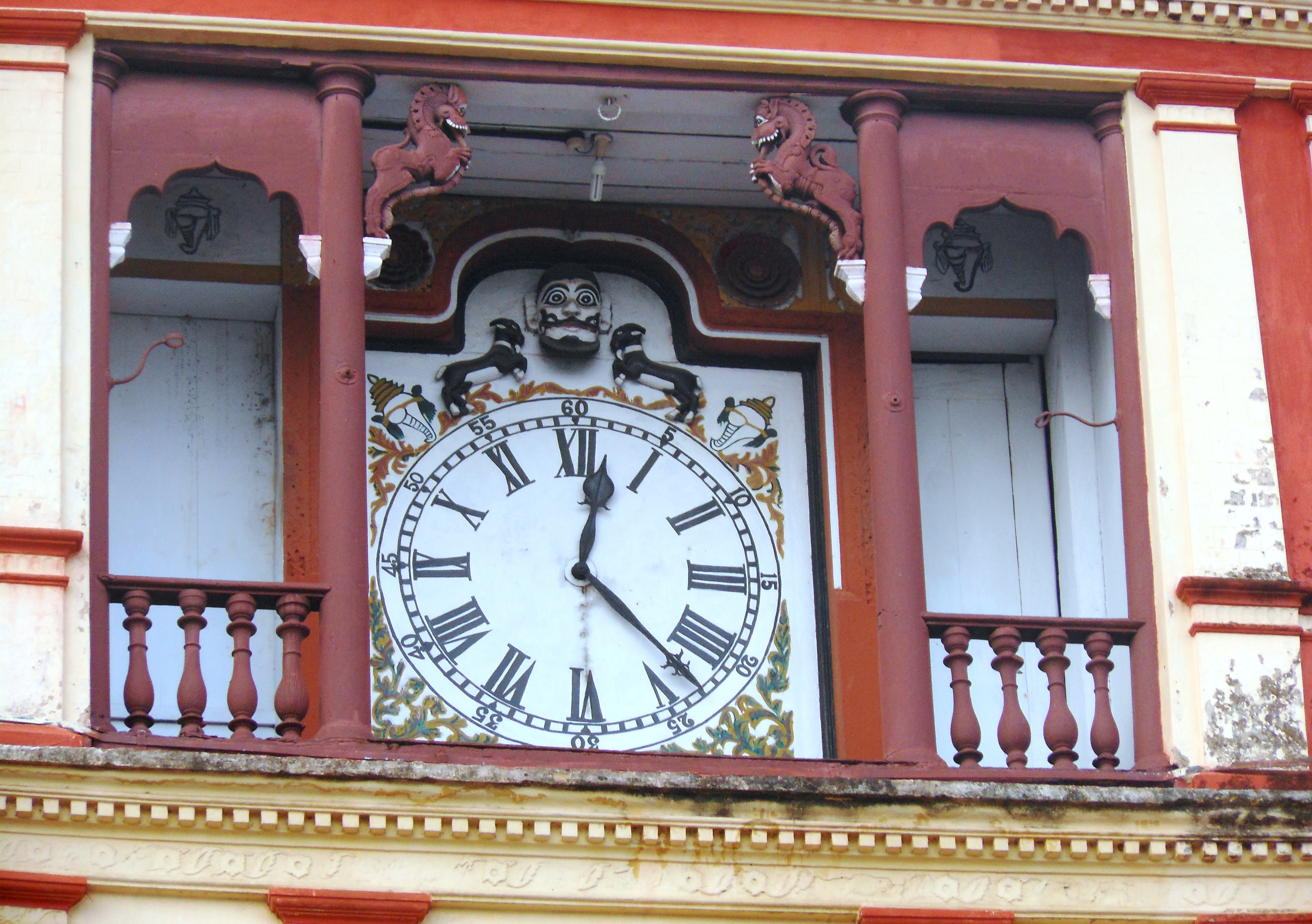

- Location of Trivandrum within India Methan mani (Kerala)
- 8°28′57.8″N 76°56′45.9″E
- Location: Trivandrum, Kerala, India

History
- Built: 1833

Site notes
- Architect: Kulathooran
- Architectural style: Kerala architecture

Methan Mani is a clock tower which stands next to the Padmanabha Swamy Temple, East Fort, Thiruvananthapuram in the south west Indian state of Kerala. It is a historic landmark and a tourist attraction.

== Location ==
The "Methan Mani" is located near the Padmanabha Swamy Temple in Thiruvananthapuram. To see it, one has to stand before the temple entrance and look in the opposite direction of the Padmatheertha pond. It is on the top of the Old Fort Palace. The unique feature of the clock is the presence of a bearded man on top of the dial who opens his mouth corresponding to every hour when two rams hit his cheek and forcing him to close his mouth. This action is co-oridnated with the hourly chimes.

This face at the top of the clock dial represents the Methan (Muslim) Tipu Sultan. He has big and shocked eyes, the Islamic beard, and the skull cap.

== History ==
There is history that the clock was installed to commemorate the successful repulsion of invasion of Travancore by Tipu Sultan.

This monument "Methan Mani" (Clock Tower) was created to celebrate the humiliating defeat of Tipu Sultan and pays a fitting tribute to the triumphant Hindu warriors of Kerala at that time.

Interestingly, when Tipu attacked Kerala in the war of 1789 (ended in 1790) the warriors of Kerala under the leadership of Vaikom Padmanabha Pilla nearly chopped Tipu's right leg from his knee. The so called “Mysore Tiger" went back crippling and screaming. To honour this bravery of Sri Padmanabha Pilla, the king made this Methan Mani near the Padmanabha Swamy Temple in Thiruvananthapuram.

“I'll tie my horse in this Padmanabha's flag pole.” Tipu Sultan gave this statement and came to Travancore to conquer Kerala. He looted the state of Malabar and other parts of Kerala. Padmanabha Swamy temple is the wealthiest temple in the world. So naturally, Tipu was interested in demolishing and looting the pride of Kerala. It is said to have been installed in the 1840s during the reign of Maharaja Swathi Thirunal Rama Varma. The clock is constructed from Mahogany by an artisan called Kulathooran. Records show that two clockwork mechanisms were purchased by the then State of Travancore from Chennai. One was installed at Trivandrum, the other at Padmanabhapuram Palace, in Tamil Nadu.

== Present ==
The clock works perfectly, and strikes each hour in a day. The Methan Mani remains a popular landmark in the city with the chimes audible around the locality. There was a web version of the clock released in 2004 by the Centre for Development of Imaging Technology (C-Dit), which is offline currently.
