= Naduvil Madhom =

Hindu monastery in Kerala, India

Naduvil Madhom is one of the ancient South Indian madhoms that propagate Advaita or Non dualism. It is located at Thrissur in Kerala. The history of the Madhom can be traced to 9th century AD. So the four disciples of Sankara founded four madhoms nearby. Sureśvara (Maṇḍana Miśra) founded Naduvil Madhom, Padmapada Thekke Madhom, Hastamalaka Idayil Madhom, and Totakacharya Vadakke Madhom. Sri Suresvaracharya appointed Vilvamangalathu Swamiyar as the first Mooppil Swamiyar (head) of Naduvil Madhom.

== Vilvamangalathu Swamiyar alias Divakara Muni ==
Vilvamangalathu Swamiyar was born to Vilvamangalathu Nilakanta Sarman and his wife . The parents named their son Divakara Sarman. From his childhood Divakara was a great devotee of Lord Krishna. He married, but lost his wife soon. After the death of his mother he accepted sannyasa from Suresvara. Thus in the age of thirty two Vilvamangalathu Divakara Sarman came to be known as Vilvamangalathu Swamiyar. Most of his disciples were from Tulu Brahmin community. But Kulukkalloor Swamiyar, his chief disciple, was a Nambuthiri.

The Mooppil Swamiyar travelled all over Kerala and defeated all Pashandas (those who do not accept the authority of the Vedas) in debates.

Once, Vilvamangalathu Swamiyar was residing at Ananthapuram Temple, Kasargod. At the time of his pallithevaram or puja Lord Vishnu used to appear before him in the form of a mischievous child. The Swamiyar's attachment to the child grew as days rolled by. One day the child took a salagrama and put it in his mouth. The furious Swamiyar pushed aside the child. The child disappeared after saying that the Swamiyar, if interested in meeting him again, would have to go to Anantankadu. As the Swamiyar reached Anantankadu he saw the child becoming one with a huge iluppa tree. The tree fell onto the ground assuming the form of Sri Ananta Padmanabha with his head at Thiruvallom, navel in Thiruvananthapuram and lotus-feet at Thrippadapuram. At the request of the Swamiyar, the Lord reduced his size. The Swamiyar circumambulated the Lord, prostrated before him and offered nivedyam to him. Vilvamangalam made arrangements for the construction of a grand temple. Then he stayed at a madhom near Sree Padmanabhaswamy Temple to do Pushpanjali daily.

The Swamiyar attained videha mukti on Pournami in the month of Vaisakha. He was thirty eight. At Vilvamangalam Krishna Temple, Thiruvananthapuram, the idol of Lord Krishna is installed over the samadhi (final resting place) of the Swamiyar. Kulukkalloor Swamiyar succeeded him as the next Mooppil Swamiyar of Naduvil Madhom.

The biography of Vilvamangalathu Swamiyar ( Divakara Muni ) is narrated in 'Divakara Charita', authored by a Swamiyar of Naduvil Madhom.

'Devesvarashtakam' is a stotra by Vilvamangalam. Devesvara referred to in the stotra could either be his guru, Suresvara, or Sri Krishna, the Lord of gods.

There were at least two Nambuthiri illoms by the name Vilvamangalam - the first one was at Sukapuram and the second one at Panniyur. The disciple of Suresvara belonged to the first illom. Krishna Lilasuka, the author of 'Sri Krishna karnamritam', belonged to Vilvamangalam located at Panniyur. He accepted sannyasa from Thekke Madhom.

== Ettara Yogam and Naduvil Madhom ==
Traditionally, only the Swamiyars of Naduvil Madhom and Munchira Madhom had the right to perform Pushpanjali to Sri Padmanabha. Even today the Ettara Yogam, the once powerful governing body of the Sree Padmanabha Swamy Temple, holds its sessions only in the presence of the Pushpanjali Swamiyar. The Kings of Travancore needed the permission of the Yogam even to adopt a new member to the royal family. In the past, if subjects of Travancore had any grievance they could raise Uthirakkura or Rudhirakkura (red flag) at the Western entrance of the Padmanabhaswamy Temple. The Swamiyar who enters through the Western entrance would take note of this and pass orders for the redressal of the grievance. People irrespective of their religion have benefitted from this system. In 1592 AD, the Christian fishermen of Rajakkamangalam were driven to Kanyakumari by Hindus. A Portuguese priest was the leader of the fishermen. He raised a red flag at the Western entrance of the Temple. The members of Ettara Yogam took action and brought back the Christian fishermen to Rajakkamangalam.

== More about Naduvil Madhom ==
- Lord Parthasarathy (Krishna) is the Guardian Deity of Naduvil Madhom. Though adwaitins (non-dualists), the Swamiyars are Vaishnavas in nature.
- Only Nambuthiries from Sukapuram, Peruvanam and Irinjalakkuda having Bhattavritti and right to Agnihotram can accept sannyasa from Naduvil Madhom.
- The seniority of a Swamiyar is determined not by his age but by the number of Chaturmasya vratams he has observed.
- In the past the Madhom possessed temples and paddy fields all over Kerala. Even today the Madhom owns and manages around forty temples in the Malabar region. The famous Thiruvalathur Randu Moorthy Temple, Palakkad is one of them.

== Maravanchery Swamiyar ==
Maravanchery Thekkedathu Nilakanta Bharatikal is the current Mooppil Swamiyar of Naduvil Madhom. He was born as the son of Maravanchery Thekkedathu Chitran Nambuthiripad and Neeli Antharjanam of Pandamparampathu Mana on 14 September 1935. After leading the life of a grihastha, he accepted sannyasa on 1 July 2001 when Meppoyilathu Ashtamoorthi Bharatikal was the Mooppil Swamiyar of Naduvil Madhom. On 6 June 2002 Meppoyilathu Swamiyar attained videha mukti, and Maravanchery Swamiyar succeeded him.

Maravanchery Swamiyar was in news for strongly opposing the opening of Sree Padmanabha Swamy Temple's Vault B.
