= Mukilan =

Mukilan was a Muslim Mughal military commander known to have invaded Venad. He was killed during the Battle of Manacaud by the Nair archers under Kottayam Kerala Varma.

In 1680 Nanjanad was overrun by troops he commanded (known locally as Mughilin pada- mughal army). He plundered and demolished a temple in Budhapuram, near Kanyakumari and slaughtered the Cattle of the priests. He then planned to attack the Padmanabhaswamy temple, but was checked by a Muslim force from Manacaud who were Loyal to the Venad Throne in between Varkala and Thovala. The Ettara Yogakkar, the Barons of Kerala fled in cowardice.

He then decided to march into Travancore via the Aromboli Pass and to became the ruler of the country between Thovala and Edava on the coast line of Travancore. He campaigned to attack the suburbs of Thiruvananthapuram and to camp at Manacaud. Rani Umayamma, Regent of the Venad Kingdom herself fled Thiruvananthapuram and sought refuge at Nedumangad. She raised an army was joined by the Nair armies under the young prince of Kottayam Kerala Varma. The Mughal forces were eventually beaten back by the forces led by Kottayam Kerala Varma. Pursuing the Mughal army, Kerala Varma and his army caught up with them and engaged in battle with them at Thiruvattar. The Mughal army was defeated and Mukilan was killed in the battle. Kerala Varma captured three hundred horses, swords, spears, etc. from the defeated Mukilan's army. Umayamma and Ravi Varma safely returned to Thiruvananthapuram, where Ravi Varma was adopted into the Venad royal family.
