= Padmanabhaswamy Temple treasure =

Collection of treasure discovered in India

The Padmanabhaswamy temple treasure is a collection of valuable objects including gold thrones, crowns, coins, statues and ornaments, diamonds and other precious stones. The Padmanabhaswamy Temple is located in Thiruvananthapuram, in the Indian state of Keralam, where five of its six (or possibly eight) vaults were opened on 27 June 2011. The vaults were opened on the orders of the Supreme Court of India, which was hearing a private petition, which sought transparency in the running of the temple. The discovery of the treasure attracted widespread national and international media attention as it is considered to be the largest collection of items of gold and precious stones in the recorded history of the world. On the possibility of future appropriation of the wealth, for the need of a new management and proper inventorying of the articles in the vaults, a public interest petition was registered with the Supreme Court of India. In 2020, the Travancore Royal Family won the rights to manage the temple, as well all its financial aspects. The Supreme Court of India overruled the Kerala High Court's legal jurisprudence based on regional facts and recognition of the nullified princely agreement based on "Ruler of Travancore."

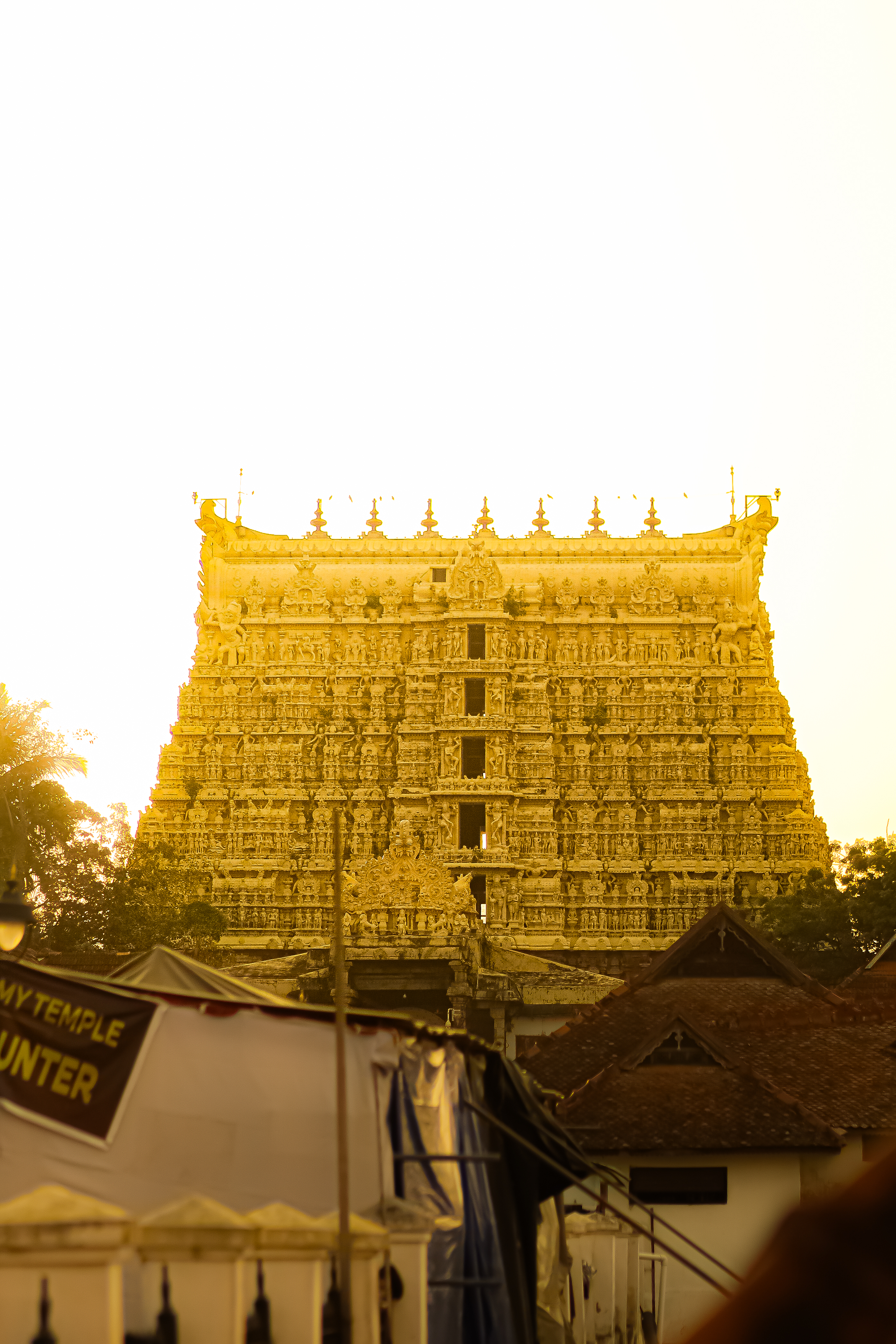
Gopuram of the temple

== Vaults ==
The temple management authorities were aware of the existence of at least six vaults. They were situated underground, all around, and to the west of the Sanctum sanctorum of the temple. For documentation purposes, these vaults have been designated as vaults A, B, C, D, E and F. Subsequently, two additional subterranean vaults have been discovered, and they have been designated as Vault G and Vault H.

- Vault B has not been opened since at least the 1880s. The Supreme-Court-appointed committee-members, based on the 2014 amicus curiae and audit reports, cited instances of irregularities and mismanagement in the affairs of the temple. They opened the metal-grille door to Vault B and discovered a sturdy wooden door just behind it. They opened this door as well, and encountered a third door made of iron, which was jammed shut. The observers tried to force their way in but failed. So they decided to hire a professional locksmith to open or remove the door gently. Then in mid-July, before the locksmith came, the royal family got an injunction from the Supreme Court against opening vault B. Apparently, this was promulgated after a 4-day private decision-making process, based on astrology (Ashtamangala Devaprasnam) in 2011. Finally in July 2020, the Supreme Court refused to give permission to open the vault, as it was an issue involving religious sentiments.
- As of end of 2020, Vaults G and H (both of which are long-forgotten cellars that were found by the amicus curiae in 2014) remain closed, and have been so for centuries.
- Four of the vaults, namely those designated as C, D, E, and F, are in the custody of the temple priests. Over recent years, they have been opened at least eight times every year, and some of the contents stored in them are routinely taken out for use on special ceremonial occasions such as temple festivals, and are deposited back after use.
- Following the orders of the Supreme Court of India, a court-appointed committee opened the vaults on 30 June 2011 and entered vault A. They unlocked an iron grille and a heavy wooden door and then removed a Granite slab from the floor. Beneath, a few steps led to a dark room, which stored the treasure. The various items found scattered everywhere seemed to be not arranged systematically. There were also baskets and earthen pots and Copper pots with all of them containing valuable objects.

== Inventory ==
The Supreme Court of India had ordered an amicus curiae appointed by it to prepare an inventory of the treasure. Full details of the inventory have not been revealed. However, newspaper reports gave an indication of some of the possible contents of the vaults. About 40 groups of objects were retrieved from Vault E and Vault F. Another 1469 groups of objects were found in Vault C and 617 in Vault D. Over 102000 groups of objects (referred to as articles collectively) were recovered from Vault A alone.

According to news reports some of the items found include:

- A 4-foot (1.2 m) high and 3-foot (0.91 m) wide solid pure-gold idol of Mahavishnu studded with diamonds and other precious stones
- A solid pure-gold throne, studded with hundreds of diamonds and precious stones, meant for the 18-foot (5.5 m) idol of the deity
- Ceremonial attire for adorning the deity in the form of 16-part gold anki weighing almost 30 kilograms (66 lb)
- An 18-foot (5.5 m) long pure-gold chain among thousands of pure-gold chains
- A pure-gold sheaf weighing 500 kilograms (1,100 lb)
- A 36-kilogram (79 lb) golden veil
- 1200 'Sarappalli' pure-gold coin-chains encrusted with precious stones weighing between 3.5 kilograms (7.7 lb) and 10.5 kilograms (23 lb)
- Several sacks filled with golden artefacts, necklaces, diadems, diamonds, rubies, sapphires, emeralds, gemstones, and objects made of precious metals
- Gold coconut shells studded with rubies and emeralds
- Several 18th-century Napoleonic-era coins
- Hundreds of thousands of gold coins of the Roman Empire
- An 800-kilogram (1,800 lb) hoard of gold coins dating to the medieval period

According to varying reports, at least three if not many more, solid gold crowns all studded with diamonds and other precious stones and pots of gold were found. While the above list is on the basis of news reports describing the July 2011 opening (and later) of Vaults A, C, D, E and F, a 1930s report from The Hindu mentions a granary-sized structure (within either Vault C or Vault D or Vault E or Vault F) almost filled with mostly gold and some Silver coins.

== Source of wealth ==
The valuables have been accumulated in the temple over several thousand years, having been donated to the Deity, and subsequently stored in the Temple, by various Dynasties, such as the Cheras, the Pandyas, the Travancore royal family, the Kolathiris, the Pallavas, the Cholas, and many other Kings of both South India and beyond. Most scholars believe that this was accumulated over thousands of years, given the mention of the Deity and the Temple in several extant Hindu Texts, the Tamil Sangam literature (500 BC to 300 AD wherein it was referred to as the "Golden Temple" on account of its then unimaginable wealth), and the treasures consist of countless artefacts dating back to the Chera, Pandya, and Greek and Roman epochs. The ancient epic Silappatikaram (circa 100 AD to 300 AD) speaks of the then Chera King Cenkuttuvan receiving gifts of gold and precious stones from a certain 'Golden Temple' (Arituyil-Amardon) which is believed to be the Sree Padmanabhaswamy Temple.

Gold had been mined as well as panned from rivers in Thiruvananthapuram, Kannur, Wayanad, Kollam, Palakkad and Malappuram districts for thousands of years. The Malabar region had several centers of trade and commerce since the Sumerian Period ranging from Vizhinjam in the South to Mangaluru in the North. Also, at times like the invasion by Mysore, the other royal families like the Kolathiris (a branch of the Thiruvithamkur Royal Family - both originating in the Thiruvananthapuram area) in the then Keralam and the Far-South took refuge in Thiruvananthapuram, and stored their temple-wealth there for safekeeping in the Padmanabhaswamy Temple. Also, much of the treasures housed in the much larger and as-yet-unopened vaults, as well as in the much smaller cellars that have been opened, date back to long before the institution of the so-called Travancore Kingdom, e.g. the 800-kg hoard of gold coins from 200 B.C that was mentioned by Vinod Rai. Noted archaeologist and historian R. Nagaswamy has also stated that several records exist in Keralam, of offerings made to the Deity, from several parts of Keralam. Further, during the reign of Maharani Gowri Lakshmi Bayi, hundreds of temples were brought under the Government. The ornaments in these temples were also transferred to the Vaults of the Padmanabhaswamy Temple. Instead the funds of the Padmanabhaswamy Temple were utilised for the daily upkeep of these temples. From 1766 until 1792, Travancore also provided refuge to around a dozen other Hindu rulers who had fled their own princely states along the Malabar Coast, due to fears of possible military defeat by Kingdom of Mysore. They came with whatever valuables they had in their temples and donated them to Lord Padmanabha. These rulers, and their extended family members, also left their wealth with Lord Padmanabha, when they finally returned home, after Mysore's military defeat by the British forces in 1792.

There are over 3000 surviving bundles of 'Cadjan' leaves (records) in Archaic Malayalam and ancient Tamil, each bundle consisting of a hundred-thousand leaves, which relate to donations of gold and precious stones made exclusively to the temple over the millennia. Most of these are yet to have been studied and very few have even been glanced at yet. As these pertain exclusively to the donations made over millennia they would throw a lot of light on the story of the treasure. Lastly, it has to be remembered that in the period of the Travancore Kingdom, a distinction was always made between the Government (or State) Treasury (Karuvoolam) and the Royal Treasury (Chellam) and the Temple Treasury (Thiruvara Bhandaram or Sri Bhandaram).
