= Padmanabhaswamy Temple =

Temple dedicated to Vishnu in Thiruvananthapuram

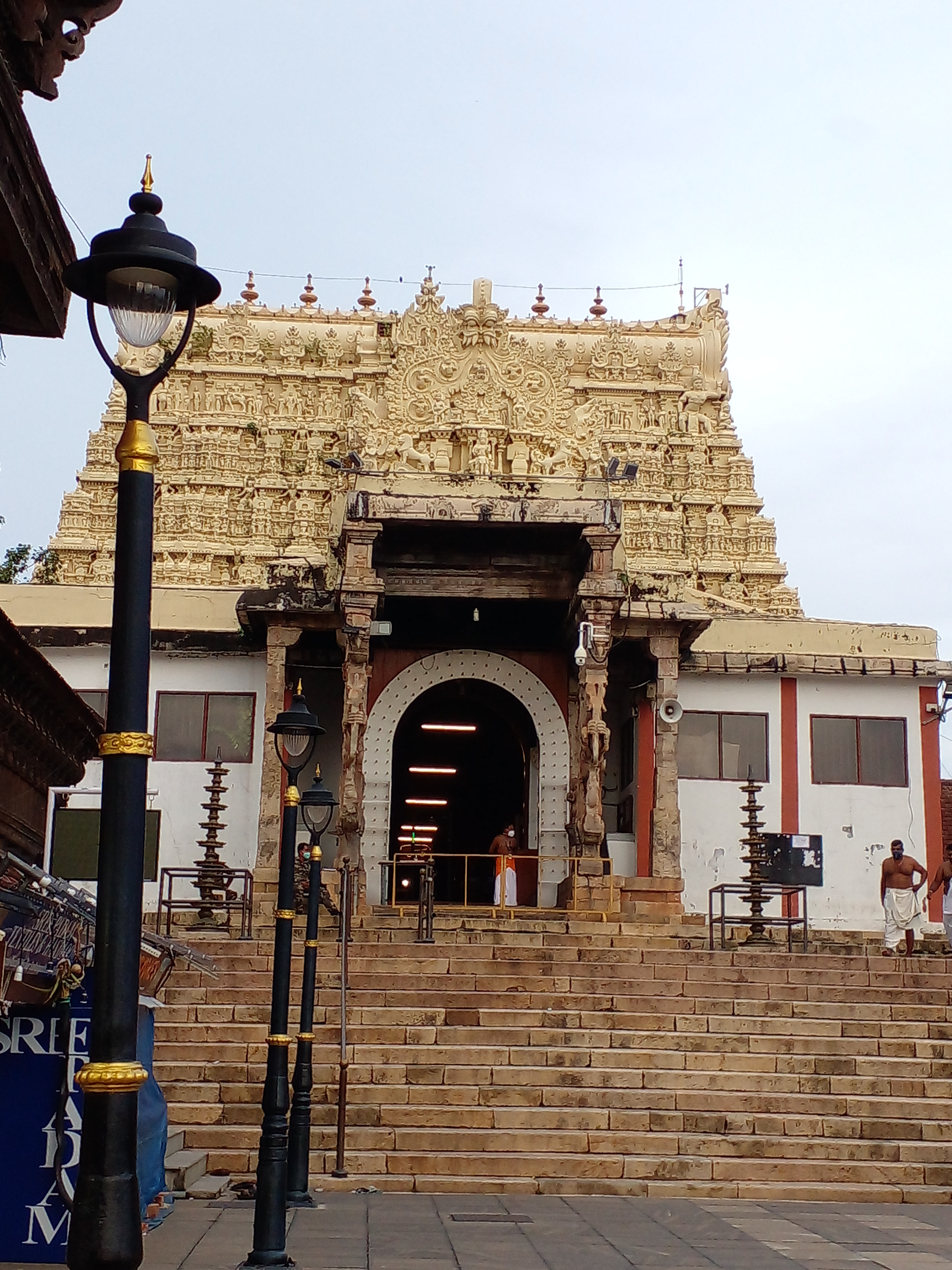
- Entrance of the Sree Padmanabhaswamy Temple

- Padmanabhaswamy Temple (Kerala) Padmanabhaswamy Temple (India) Padmanabhaswamy Temple (Asia)

Religion
- Affiliation: Hinduism
- District: Thiruvananthapuram District
- Deity: Anantha Padmanabhaswamy (a form of Vishnu) and Lakshmi
- Governing body: Administrative Committee appointed by the Supreme Court of India

Location
- Location: Thiruvananthapuram
- State: Kerala
- Country: India
- Coordinates: 8°28′58″N 76°56′37″E

Architecture
- Type: Fusion of Kerala architecture and Tamil architecture

Website
- spstt.org spst.in

The Padmanabhaswamy Temple (Malayalam: [pɐd̪mɐnaːbʰɐswaːmi]) is a Hindu temple dedicated to Vishnu in Thiruvananthapuram, Kerala, India. It is one of the 108 Divya Desams which are considered the sacred sites of the Sri Vaishnava tradition.

The temple's principal deity is Anantha Padmanabhaswamy, a form of Vishnu depicted in yogic sleep, on his serpent mount named Shesha. Padmanabhaswamy is the tutelary deity of the Travancore royal family. The titular Maharaja of Travancore, Moolam Thirunal Rama Varma, is the current trustee of the temple.

== Mythology, legends, and stories ==
The Temple is referred to as 'Syanandoorapura' in the Puranas and Hindu Epics. Several extant Hindu texts including the Vishnu Purana, Brahma Purana, Matsya Purana, Varaha Purana, Skanda Purana, Padma Purana, Vayu Purana, Bhagavata Purana and Mahabharata mention the Padmanabhaswamy Temple.

It is believed that Parashurama "purified and venerated" the idol of Sree Padmanabhaswamy in the Dvapara Yuga. As per the legend, Parashurama entrusted 'Kshethra Karyam' (administration of the Temple) to seven Potti families – Koopakkara Potti, Vanchiyoor Athiyara Potti, Kollur Athiyara Potti, Muttavila Potti, Karuva Potti, Neythasseri Potti and Sreekaryathu Potti. Then King Adithya Vikrama of Vanchi (Venad) was directed by Parashurama to do 'Paripalanam' (Protection) of the Temple. Parashurama is said to have given the 'Tantram' of the Temple to Tharananallur Namboothiripad. This legend is narrated in detail in the Kerala Mahathmyam which forms part of the Brahmanda Puranam.

Another story, which is more recent and less regarded mythologically and legendarily, associates the Temple with the legendary sage Vilvamangalathu Swamiyar (also called Divakara Muni in some versions).

== History ==
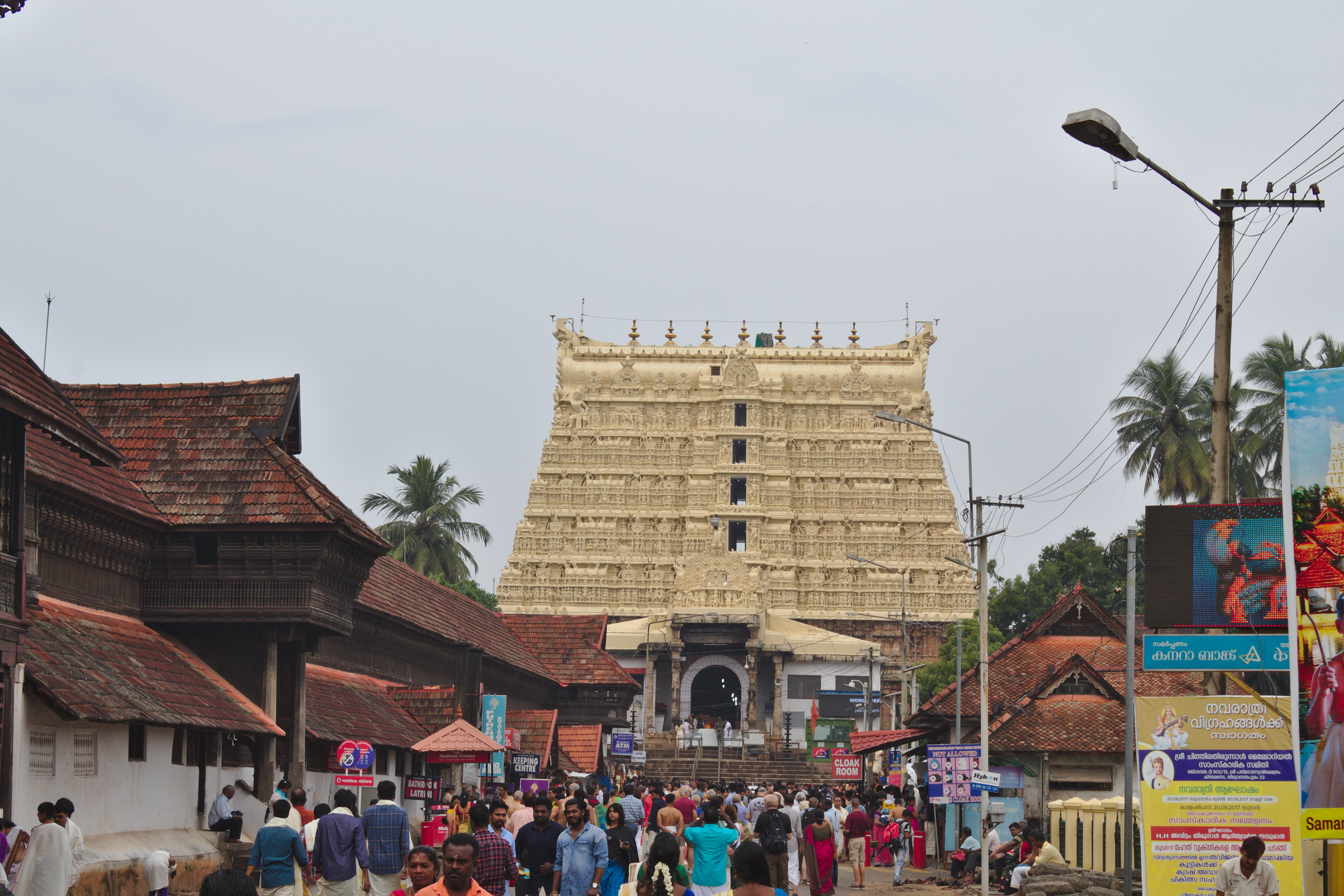
Gopuram of the Padmanabhaswamy Temple

The Temple has been referred to in (the only recorded) Sangam period literature several times including in the Cilappatikaram. Many conventional historians and scholars believe that one of the names that the Temple had, "The Golden Temple", was in cognisance of the Temple's extreme wealth by that point (early Sangam period). Many extant pieces of Sangam Tamil literature and poetry as well as later works of the 9th century of Tamil poet–saints like Nammalwar eulogise the temple as heaven and both the temple and the city as having walls and streets of pure gold.

The temple is one of the 108 principal Divya Desams ("Holy Abodes") in Vaishnavism according to existing Tamil hymns from the seventh and eighth centuries C.E and is glorified in the Divya Prabandha. The Divya Prabandha extols this shrine as being among the 13 Divya Desams in Malai Nadu (corresponding to present-day Kerala with Kanyakumari District). Nammalwar sang the glories of Padmanabha.

Mukilan, a Muslim marauder, temporarily invaded parts of Venad in 1680 AD and destroyed Budhapuram Bhaktadasa Perumal Temple which was owned by Neythasseri Potti. Mukilan intended to plunder Padmanabhaswamy Temple and destroy it, but he was dissuaded from doing so by local Muslims loyal to the royals of Venad, soon after which he was killed in the Battle of Manacaud.

=== Extant temple records ===
A pertinent event in the long history of the temple was the construction of a "granta-pura" (record-room) within the temple compound itself around 1425 AD by the then Venad King Veera Iravi Iravi Varma, to store the "Mathilakam" (within-the-walls) records, as the then existing temple records were known.

A major portion of the records (over 3000 'Cadjan' leaf-records) from the Mathikalam had been donated later to the Archives Department in 1867 at the time of the formation of the latter. Each of these Cadjan leaf-records, which have been compiled over thousands of years, contains 10,000 documentations according to R. Nagaswamy, noted archaeologist and historian, totalling over 30 crores of records. Despite their cultural value, only a small portion of these grantas (bundles) of cadjan leaf records which are written mostly in ancient scripts of Middle Tamil and Malayalam, have been studied and deciphered.

The rest of these Mathilakam documents – segregated under 70 "heads" – is still with the Archives Department. According to Aswathi Thirunal Gouri Lakshmi Bayi, a member of the Travancore Royal Family and author of a book on the temple, from a very early period in recorded history the temple had employed two kinds of 'record writers'. One group was to record the proceedings and transactions of the Ettarayogam, a council of temple administrators, that included the then king. The other was to write and preserve the records of the day-to-day functioning of the temple, maintain correct accounts of the temple-treasury, and of temple-revenue-collections and of temple-expenditure, as well as to note down all the other records connected with the functioning of the temple.

== Temple structure ==
=== Main shrine ===
Interior of the Padmanabhaswamy Temple

In the Garbhagriha, Padmanabha reclines on the serpent, Anantha or Adi Sesha. The serpent has five hoods facing inwards intended to signify contemplation. The deity's right hand is placed over a Shiva lingam. Sridevi-Lakshmi, the Goddess of Prosperity and Bhudevi, the Goddess of Earth, two consorts of Vishnu, are by his side. Brahma is depicted as emerging on a lotus which emanates from the navel of the deity. The deity is made from 12,008 saligramams. These saligrams are from the banks of the Gandaki River in Nepal, and to commemorate this, certain rituals used to be performed at the Pashupatinath Temple. The idol is covered with a special ayurvedic mix called "Katusarkara yogam".

The platforms in front of the vimanam and where the deity rests are both carved out of a single massive stone and hence called "Ottakkal-mandapam". On the orders of Marthanda Varma (1706–58), the Ottakkal-mandapam was cut out of a rock at Tirumala (a village in Thiruvananthapuram District), about 4 miles (6.4 km) north of the temple. It measured 20 square feet (1.9 m^{2}; 190 dm^{2}; 19,000 cm^{2}) in area by 2.5 feet (30 in; 7.6 dm; 76 cm) thick and was placed in front of the deity in the month of Edavom 906 M.E. (1731 CE). At the same time, Marthanda Varma also brought 12,000 shaligrams, aniconic representations of Vishnu, from the Gandaki River, north of Varanasi. These were used in the re-consecration of Padmanabha.

=== Other shrines ===
Inside the Temple, there are two other important shrines - Thekkedom and Thiruvambadi - for the deities Ugra Narasimha and Krishna Swami, respectively. The Thiruvambadi shrine enjoys an independent status. Thiruvambadi has its own namaskara mandapam and bali stones and flagmast. The deity of Thiruvambadi is Parthasarathi, the "Divine Charioteer" of Arjuna, who is the warrior prince and one of the main protagonists that appear in the epic of Mahabharata. The two-armed granite idol, with one hand holding the whip and the other resting on the left thigh holding the conch close to it, is in standing posture. The deity is dressed and adorned as Mohini on Ekadashi days.

There are also shrines for Rama accompanied by his wife Sita, half-brother Lakshmana, Hanuman, Vishvaksena (the Nirmalyadhari of Vishnu and "Remover of Obstacles"), Vyasa and Ashwatthama, Ganapati, Sasta and Kshetrapala (who guards the temple). Idols of Garuda and Hanuman stand with folded hands in the Valiya balikkal area.

=== Gopuram ===
The foundation of the present gopuram built in 1566. The temple has a 100-foot (30 m) high 7-tier gopuram built in the Pandyan style. The temple stands by the side of a tank, named Padma Theertham, meaning the 'Lotus Spring'. The temple has a corridor which has 365 and one-quarter sculptured granite-stone pillars with elaborate carvings, that stands out to be an ultimate testimonial to the Vishvakarma sthapathis, in sculpting it. This corridor extends from the eastern side into the sanctum sanctorum. An 80-foot (24 m) flagstaff stands in front of the main entry from the prakaram (closed precincts of a temple).

== Priests ==
Temples where 'Swamiyar Pushpanjali' is conducted are claimants to extra sanctity. Sannyasins from Naduvil Madhom and Munchira Madhom perform Pushpanjali (flower worship) daily to Padmanabha and Narasimha Moorthi and Krishna Swami. Tharananallur Nambuthiripads of Iranjalakkuda are the Tantris of the Temple. The Nambis, altogether four in number, are the Chief Priests of the Temple. Two Nambis – Periya Nambi and Panchagavyathu Nambi – are allotted to Padmanabha and one Nambi each to Narasimha Moorthi and Krishna Swami. The Nambis hail from either side of the Chandragiri River.

== Temple entry ==
In line with the Temple Entry Proclamation, only those who profess the Hindu faith are permitted entry to the temple, and devotees have to strictly follow the dress code. Men wear "Vesti" with "Angavastram" (the South Indian version of the 'dhoti' and the shawl, both plain white in color) and women wear sari.

== Offer of Worship ==
Devotees ascend to the mandapam to perform darshan and Pooja. The deity is visible through three doors. The reclining Padmanabha and Sivalinga underneath his hand are visible through the first door along with Sridevi and Bhrigu Muni in Katusarkara and Brahma seated on a lotus emanating from the deity's navel (hence the name "Padmanabha"). Gold 'abhisheka' moorthies of Padmanabha, Sridevi and Bhudevi, and silver utsava moorthi of Padmanabha are visible through the second door. The deity's feet along with Bhudevi and Markandeya Muni in Katusarkara are visible through the third door. The idols of two goddesses holding chamaram, Garuda, Narada, Tumburu, the divine forms of the six weapons of Vishnu, Surya, Chandra, the Saptarshi, Madhu, and Kaitabha are also in the Sanctum. Only the King of Travancore may prostrate on the "Ottakkal-mandapam". It is traditionally held that anybody who prostrates on the mandapam has surrendered all that he possesses to the deity. Since the ruler has already done that he is permitted to prostrate on this mandapam.

== Temple rituals ==
=== Festivals and rites ===
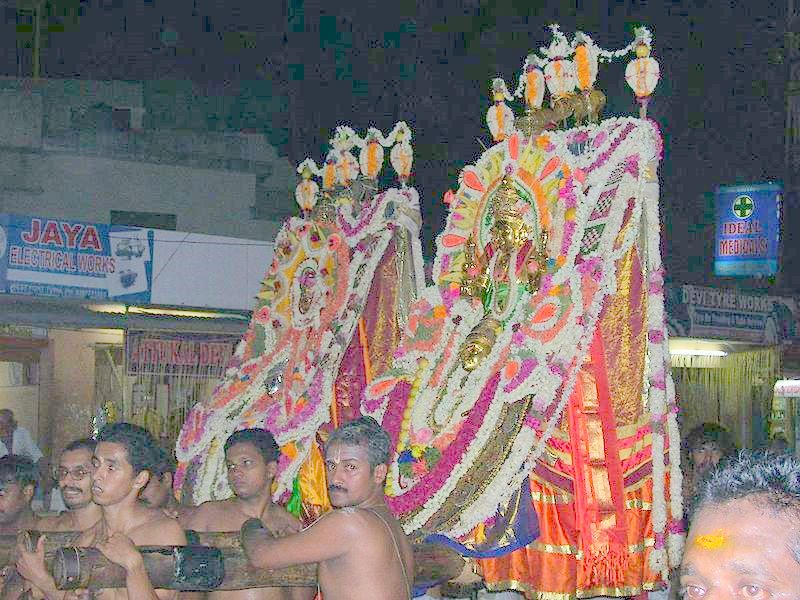
Narasimha Swamy and Padmanabha Swamy after coming from Shankumugham Beach during Aarat Festival

There are many festivals associated with this temple. The major festivals are bi-annual. The Aipasi festival and the Panguni festival in the Tamil month of aipasi (October/November) and Panguni (March/April) respectively last for 10 days each. On the ninth day, the Maharaja of Travancore, in his capacity as 'Thrippappoor Mooppan', escorts the deities to the 'Vettakkalam', for 'Pallivetta'. Centuries ago, the Pallivetta procession was said to pass through Kaithamukku, Kuthiravattom (Kunnumpuram) and Pazhaya Sreekanteswaram as well as Putharikkandam. The festivals culminate with the Aarat (holy bath) procession to the Shankumugham Beach. The word Aarat refers to the purifying immersion of the deities of the temple in the sea (the Indian Ocean. This event takes place in the evening. The Maharaja of Travancore escorts the Aarat procession on foot. The festival idols ("Utsava Vigrahas") of Padmanabhaswamy, Narasimha Moorthi and Krishna Swami are given a ritual bath in the sea, after the prescribed Poojas. After this ceremony, the idols are taken back to the temple in a procession that is lit by traditional torches, marking the conclusion of the festival.

A major annual festival related to Padmanabhaswamy temple is the Navaratri festival. The idols of Saraswati Amman, Mun Uditha Nangai (Parasakti, who appeared before Saraswati, Lakshmi and Parvati to help them identify their husbands who had been transformed into infants by the power of chastity of Anasuya) and Kumara Swami (Murugan) are brought from the Padmanabhapuram Palace, Suchindram, and Kumarakovil respectively to the Kuthira malika palace, in front of Padmanabhaswamy temple in a procession. This festival lasts for 9 days. The famous Swathi Sangeethotsavam music festival is held every year during this festival in the Navratri mandapam and in some other surrounding temples. The festival was named in honour of the Maharaja of Travancore, Swathi Thirunal Rama Varma and is organized by his descendant in the Royal Family, Prince Rama Varma.

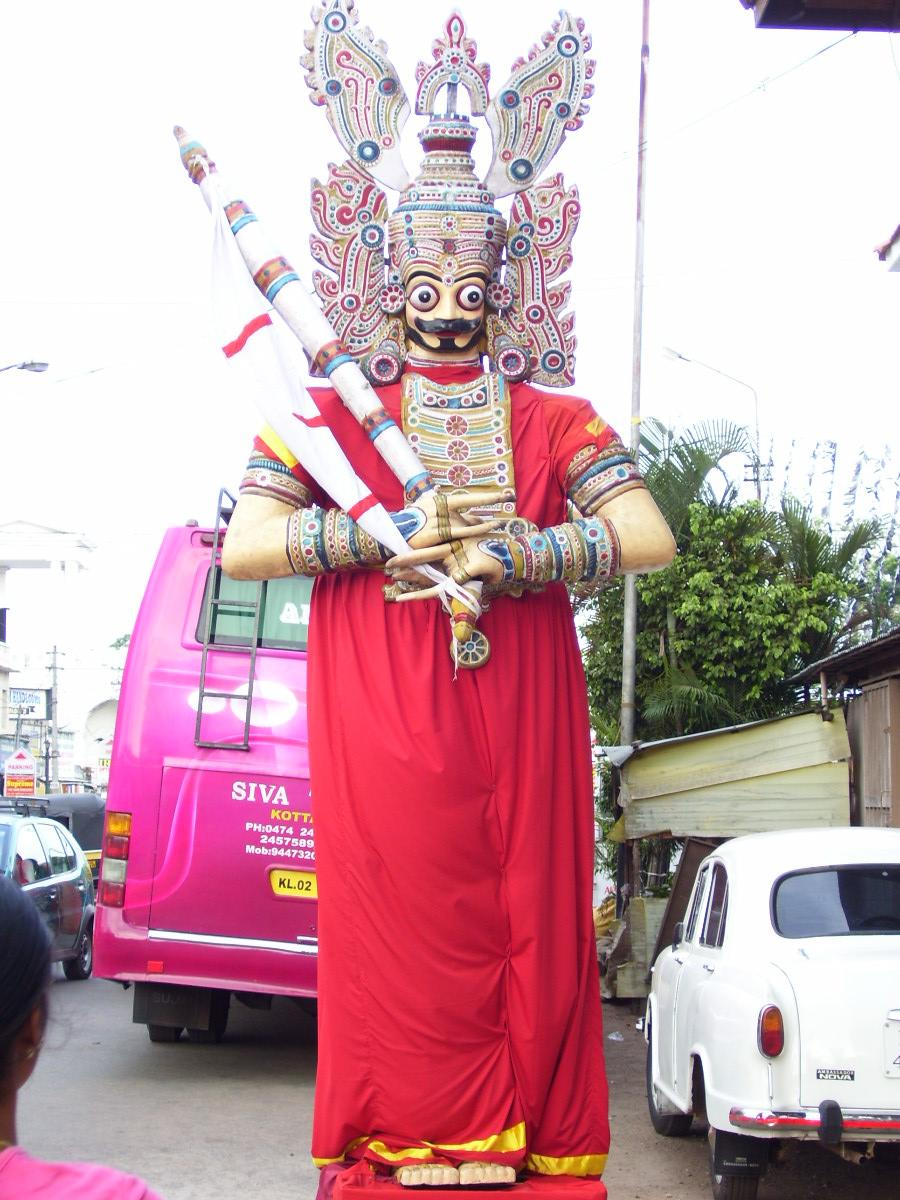
Big idol of Pandava displayed during Panguni festival

The biggest festival in this temple is Laksha Deepam which means "one lakh lamps". This festival is observed once in 6 years. Prior to this festival, chanting of prayers and recitation of three Vedas is done for 56 days, a practice called the Murajapam. On the last day of the Murajappam, one lakh oil lamps are lit, in and around the temple premises.

== Travancore Royal Family ==
In the first half of the 18th century, in line with matrilineal customs, Anizham Thirunal Marthanda Varma succeeded his uncle Rama Varma as king at the age of 23. He successfully suppressed the 700-year-old stranglehold of the Ettuveetil Pillamar ("Lords of the Eight Houses") and his cousins following the discovery of conspiracies which the lords were involved in against the royal house of Travancore (There are various legends and disputes about these mostly apocryphal stories, but overall, he took control and centralised the rule). The last major renovation of the Padmanabhaswamy temple commenced immediately after Anizham Thirunal's accession to the throne and the idol was re-consecrated in 906 ME (1731 CE). On 17 January 1750, Anizham Thirunal surrendered the Kingdom of Travancore to Padmanabhaswamy, the main deity at the temple, and pledged that he and his descendants would be vassals or agents of the deity, who would serve the kingdom as Padmanabha Dasa. Since then, the name of every Travancore king was preceded by the title 'Sree Padmanabha Dasa' and the female members of the royal family were called 'Sree Padmanabha Sevini', both meaning the "Servant to Padmanabhaswamy". The donation of the king to Padmanabhaswamy was known as 'Thrippadidanam'. The final wishes of Anizham Thirunal, on his death at the age of 53, clearly delineated the historical relationship between the Maharaja and the temple: "That no deviation whatsoever should be made in regard to the dedication of the kingdom to Padmanabhaswamy and that all future territorial acquisitions should be made over to the Devaswom".

== Temple administration ==
The Padmanabhaswamy Temple is presently (since 13 July 2020) administered by an Administrative Committee constituted in accordance with directions of the Supreme Court of India. The committee was established to oversee the secular administration, management of assets, finances, and properties of the Temple, while preserving its religious customs and traditions.

The traditional bodies associated with the Temple - such as the Ettara Yogam, the Tantri, and the Pushpanjali Swamiyar continue to perform their customary, ritualistic, and advisory roles, while the overall administrative control is exercised by the Administrative Committee under judicial supervision.

=== Composition of the Administrative Committee ===
The Administrative Committee consists of the following members:-

- The District Judge of Thiruvananthapuram – Chairperson
- A nominee of the Government of Kerala who is not below the rank of Secretary
- A nominee of the Government of India
- The Chief Tantri of the Temple or his nominee
- A representative of the Travancore Royal Family (the Maharaja of Travancore)
- An expert member with knowledge of temple administration, finance, archaeology, or conservation, as appointed in accordance with court directions

The committee functions under the continuing supervision of the Supreme Court of India and is responsible for decisions relating to temple administration, security, conservation, and management of properties, including the temple vaults.

=== Past Temple management ===
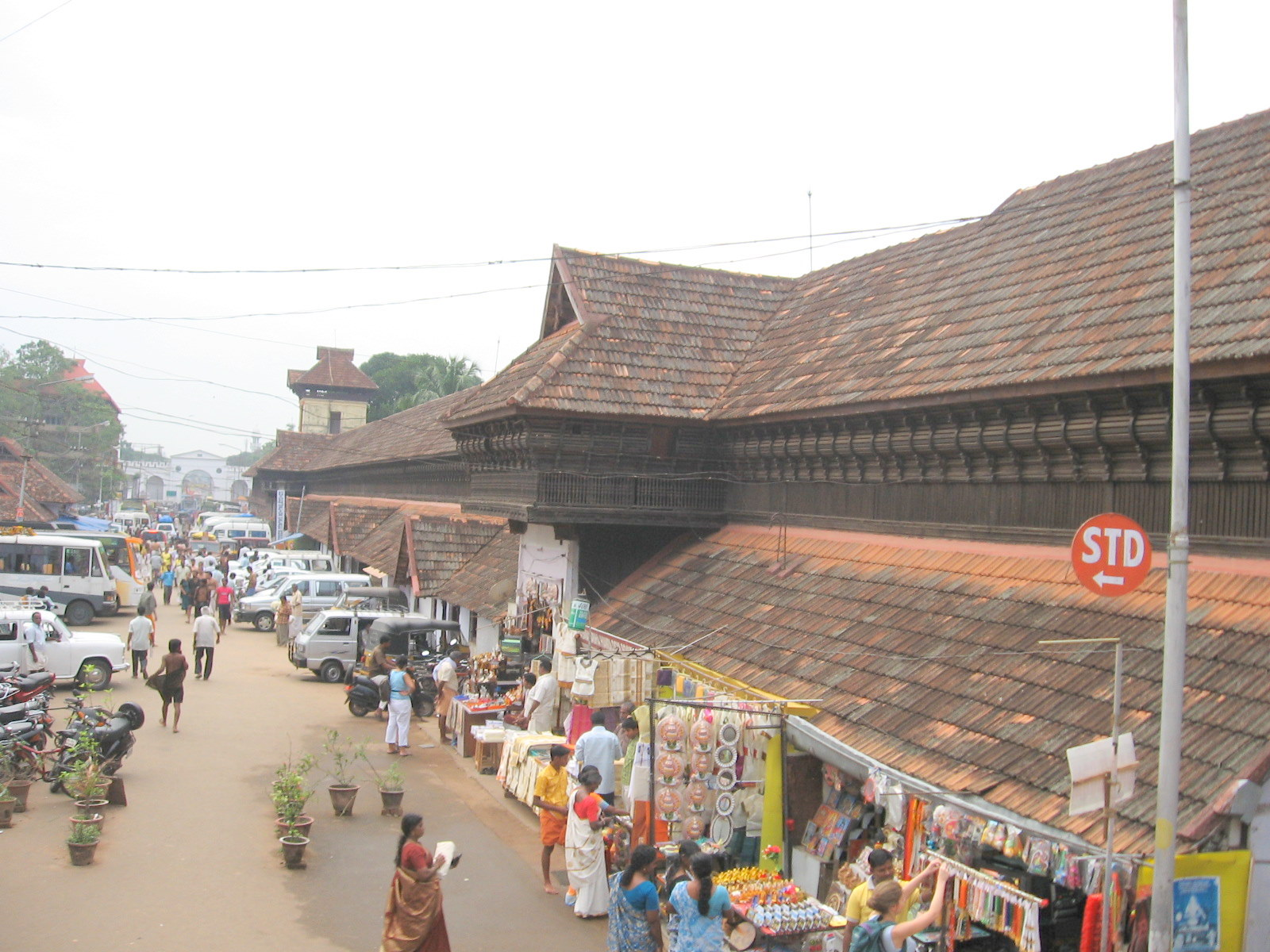
The approach road to the Padmanabhaswamy Temple

In the past, the Padmanabhaswamy Temple and its property were controlled by the Ettara Yogam (King and Council of Eight), with the assistance of Ettuveetil Pillamar ("Lords of the Eight Houses"). The Ettara Yogam consists of the Pushpanjali Swamiyar, the six-member Thiruvananthapurathu Sabha, the Sabhanjithan (Secretary) and the Arachan (Maharaja of Travancore). The Thiruvananthapurathu Sabha was primarily responsible for the administration of the Temple. Koopakkara Potti, Vanchiyoor Athiyara Potti, Kollur Athiyara Potti, Muttavila Potti, Karuva Potti and Neythasseri Potti are the members of the Sabha. The Pushpanjali Swamiyar presided over the meetings of the Sabha. Sreekaryathu Potti is the Sabhanjithan of the Sabha. Any decision taken by the Sabha can be implemented only if the Maharaja of Travancore approves of it. Legend goes that the eight members of Ettara Yogam (the seven Potties and the one Maharaja of Travancore) received their rights from Parashurama himself.

Prior to that, only the Swamiyars of the Naduvil Madhom were appointed as Pushpanjali Swamiyars by the Maharaja of Travancore. Anizham Thirunal Marthanda Varma curtailed the authority of Ettara Yogam and liquidated the powerful Ettuveetil Pillamar. Ettara Yogam became an advisory and assenting body thereafter. Besides the Naduvil Madhom, the Munchira Madhom got the right to appoint Pushpanjali Swamiyars during his reign. In the recent past, Uthradom Thirunal Marthanda Varma gave Pushpanjali rights to the Swamiyars of Thrikkaikattu Madhom and Thekke Madhom as well. Though the Maharaja is the appointing authority of the Pushpanjali Swamiyar, the former must do a "Vechu Namaskaram" when he sees the Swamiyar. With the death of Uthradom Thirunal Marthanda Varma in December 2013, his nephew Moolam Thirunal Rama Varma became the titular Maharaja of Travancore in January 2014. Like his predecessors, Moolam Thirunal also got concurrence from the Ettara Yogam before assuming the title 'Maharaja'. In the presence of the Maharaja designate, the Yogathil Pottimar and the Tantri, the Pushpanjali Swamiyar Maravanchery Thekkedathu Neelakanta Bharatikal signed on the Neettu (Order) of the Ettara Yogam accepting Moolam Thirunal as Chirava Mootha Thiruvadi (Maharaja of Travancore) and Thrippappoor Mootha Thiruvadi (Protector of the Temple). This ceremony took place at Kulasekhara Mandapam in Padmanabhaswamy Temple. Revathi Thirunal Balagopal Varma, grandson of Maharani Regent Pooradom Thirunal Sethu Lakshmi Bayi, is the titular Elayaraja of Travancore.

== Temple assets ==
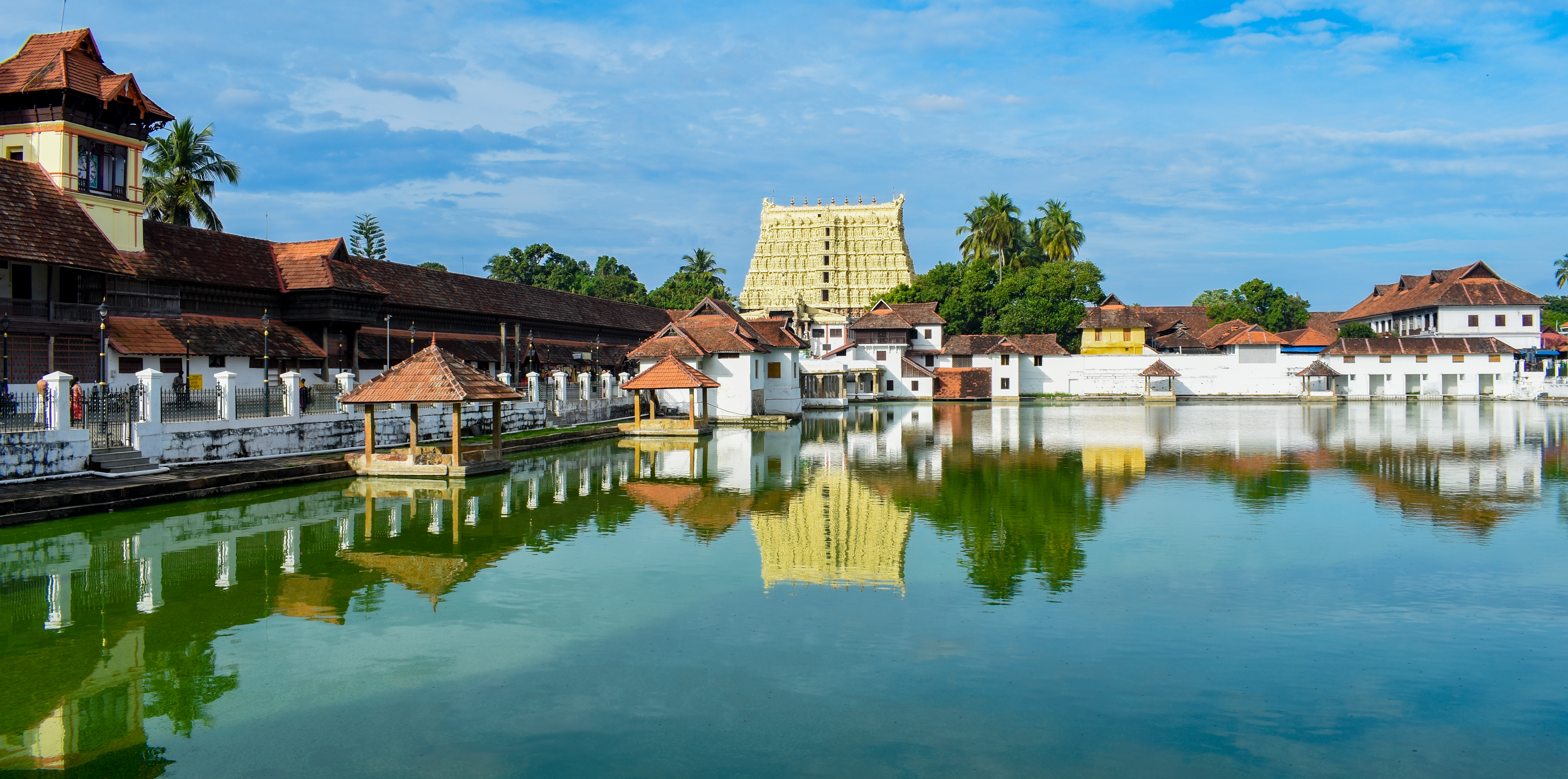
The temple and its tank

The temple and its assets belong to the deity Lord Padmanabhaswamy, and for a long time, have been controlled by a trust headed by the Travancore royal family. T P Sundararajan's litigation "changed the way the world looked at the Temple".

The temple has six hitherto known vaults (nilavaras), labelled as A to F, for bookkeeping purpose by the Court (Since then, however, an Amicus Curiae Report by Gopal Subramanium, in April 2014, mentions two more subterranean vaults that have been labelled G and H). While Vault B is believed to be unopened since the 1880s, Vault A was possibly opened in recent decades, Vaults C to F have been opened from time to time over recent years.

=== Vault (Nilavara) B ===
The Bhagavata Purana says that Balarama visited Phalgunam (now known as Thiruvananthapuram), took bath in Panchapsaras (Padmateertham), and made a gift of ten thousand cows to sages and other devotees. Though the shrine of Padmanabha was always present in what is the present-day city of Thiruvananthapuram, and it was a very ancient and renowned pilgrim spot even during the time of Balarama, the present-day temple for the deity came up later. The southwest part of the Chuttambalam (the circumambulatory path around the sanctum sanctorum) was constructed at the spot where Balarama is believed to have donated the cows. This portion came to be known as Mahabharatakonam and covered the ground underneath where both Kallara B and Kallara A were situated. As per the legend, many Devas and sages visited Balarama on the banks of Padmateertham, and requested that they be permitted to reside there and worship Padmanabha. Balarama granted them their wish. It is believed that these Devas and sages reside in Kallara B worshipping the deity. Naga Devathas devoted to the deity also dwell in this Kallara. Kanjirottu Yakshi, whose enchanting and ferocious forms are painted on the southwest part of the main Sanctum, resides in this Kallara worshipping Narasimha. "Holy" objects like Sreechakram were installed beneath this Kallara to enhance the potency of the principal deity. Ugra Narasimha of Thekkedom is said to be the Protector of Kallara B. There is a serpent's image on Kallara B "signalling" danger to anyone who opens it. A four-day Ashtamangala Devaprasnam conducted in August 2011 declared Kallara B as a "forbidden zone".

Vault B, its original name being "Mahabharata Kallara", is by far the largest cellar in the temple. One of the oldest existing estimates regarding Vault B, as per the historian Dr TP Sankarankutty Nair and the Temple priests, was by the Travancore Royal Family in the 1880s. Then, the wealth in Vault B, which is by far the largest, and the only vault (of the reported six) that is unopened so far, was worth INR 12,000 Crores (in 1880s' terms). The price of an ounce of gold was 4.26 British Pounds in 1885. The British Pound was around 5.29 to the Indian Rupee in 1885.

An article by Emily Gilchriest Hatch, a visiting Englishwoman in 1933, recalls in her book 'Travancore: A Guide Book for the Visitor' (Oxford University Press, 1933) about an unsuccessful attempt to open one Kallara in 1908: "About 25 years ago, when the State needed additional money, it was thought expedient to open these chests and use the wealth they contained." "A group of people" got together and attempted to enter the vaults with torches. When they found the vaults "infested with cobras" they "fled for their lives".

The royal family has claimed that opening Vault B could be a bad omen. The seven-member team were to consult with some more experts on 8 July 2011 and make a final decision on opening the chamber. An Ashtamangala Devaprasnam conducted in the Temple to "discern the will of the deity" 'revealed' that any attempts to open chamber B would 'cause divine displeasure and that the holy articles in the other chambers were defiled' in the inventorying process. In 2011, an antechamber to Kallara B was opened by the Observers, who were appointed by the Supreme Court of India. But the Observers could not open Kallara B. However, Gopal Subramanium in his report submitted to the Supreme Court in April 2014, recommended its opening after conducting another Devaprasnam. The two Pushpanjali Swamiyars are the highest spiritual dignitaries of Padmanabhaswamy Temple. The Pushpanjali Swamiyar of Naduvil Madhom sent letters to the Chairperson of the Administrative Committee and the Executive Officer on 8 February 2016 expressing his strong opposition to the opening of Kallara B. The Pushpanjali Swamiyar of Munchira Madhom led a Ratha Yathra from Kasaragod to Thiruvananthapuram in May 2018, campaigning against opening the sacred Kallara. Azhvanchery Thamprakkal, the supreme spiritual leader of Kerala Brahmins, while addressing a meeting held in connection with the Ratha Yathra, also demanded that faith should not be trampled upon by opening Kallara B.

According to a report by former Comptroller and Auditor General of India Vinod Rai in August 2014, at least the outermost door (antechamber) to Kallara B has been opened seven times in recent decades - twice in 1991 and five times in 2002. Once Vinod Rai's report was out, Princess Aswathi Thirunal Gowri Lakshmi Bayi clarified that Mr Rai was referring to the antechamber to Kallara B, and that that antechamber was opened even in 2011 by the Supreme Court-appointed observers. Prior to this, the Supreme-Court-appointed Amicus Curiae Gopal Subramanium had also alleged that Vault B or one of its antechambers was opened, despite a previous ruling of the Supreme court prohibiting the same.

=== Opening of the five smaller vaults in July 2011 till Supreme Court Final Judgment in July 2020 ===
In June 2011, the Supreme Court of India directed the authorities from the archaeology department and the fire services to open some of the secret chambers of the temple, and inventory the items kept inside. The two priests of the temple, the 'Periya Nambi' and the 'Thekkedathu Nambi', are the custodians of four vaults, labelled C to F, which are opened periodically. The Supreme Court had directed that "the existing practices, procedures, and rituals" of the temple be followed while opening vaults C to F and using the articles inside and that Vault A would be opened only for the purpose of making an inventory of the articles and then closed. The review of the temple's underground vaults was undertaken by a seven-member panel appointed by the Supreme Court to generate an inventory, leading to the enumeration of a vast collection of articles, that are traditionally kept under lock and key.

As per the directive of the Supreme Court of India, inventorying of the items in vaults C, D, E and F were completed (in August 2012), and formal inventorying of vault A had commenced by the end of 2012. Vaults A, C, D, E and F were opened, along with their antechambers.

Among the reported findings, is a 1.1 metres (3.5 ft) tall solid pure golden idol of Mahavishnu, studded with hundreds of diamonds and rubies and other precious stones. Also found were an 5.5-metre (18 ft)-long pure gold chain, a gold sheaf weighing 500 kg (1,100 lb), a 36 kg (79 lb) golden veil, 1200 'Sarappalli' gold coin-chains that are encrusted with precious stones, and several sacks filled with golden artefacts, necklaces, diadems, diamonds, rubies, sapphires, emeralds, gemstones, and objects made of gold. Ceremonial attire for adorning the deity in the form of 16-part gold anki weighing almost 30 kilograms (66 lb), gold "coconut shells" studded with rubies and emeralds, and several 18th-century Napoleonic era coins were found amongst many other objects. In early 2012, an expert committee had been appointed to investigate these objects, which include lakhs of golden coins of the Roman Empire, that were found in Kottayam, in Kannur District. According to Vinod Rai, the former Comptroller-and-Auditor-General (CAG) of India, who had audited some of the Temple records from 1990, in August 2014, in the already opened vault A, there is an 800 kg (1,800 lb) hoard of gold coins dating to around 200 BCE, each coin priced at over ₹2.7 crore (US$280,000). Also found was a pure golden throne, studded with hundreds of diamonds and other precious stones, meant for the 5.5-metre (18 ft)-long deity. According to one of the men who entered Vault A several of the largest diamonds were as large as a full-grown man's thumb. According to varying reports, at least three, if not more, solid gold crowns have been found, studded with diamonds and other precious stones. Some media reports also mention hundreds of pure gold chairs, thousands of gold pots and jars, among the articles recovered from Vault A and its antechambers. Several hundred pots and other items made of gold, that are used for daily rituals or intermittently for ceremonies in the Temple, were not inventoried as the Temple-priests expressed strong objections.

Over 1.02 lakh "articles" had been retrieved from Vault A and its ante-chambers and more than 2000 from Vaults C to F. An "article" could be either an individual item, or collections of several items, examples of the latter being a cache of 1.95 lakh 'Rassappanams' (Gold coins) weighing 800 kg and sets of Navaratnas (collections of nine different kinds of gems). There are over 60,000 fully precious stones set as parts of larger pieces of gold jewellery among those items inventoried as of March 2013.

Even with only the five smaller of the reported eight vaults being opened, the treasure found so far is considered to be by far, the largest collection of items of gold and fully precious stones in the history of the world.

The valuables are believed to have been accumulated in the temple over several thousand years, having been donated to the deity (and subsequently stored there), by various dynasties like the Cheras, the Pandyas, the Travancore royal family, the Kolathiris, the Pallavas, the Cholas and many other kings of both South India and beyond, and from the rulers and traders of Mesopotamia, Jerusalem, Greece, Rome, and later, the various colonial powers from Europe, and other countries as well.

Some people have suggested that a part of the stored riches reached the Travancore kings in the later years in the form of tax as well as conquered wealth of other South Indian kingdoms.

Most scholars however believe that this was accumulated over thousands of years, given the mention of the deity and the Temple in several extant Hindu Texts, the Sangam Tamil literature (500 BC to 300 AD wherein it was referred to as the "Golden Temple" on account of its then extreme wealth), and the treasures consist of countless artefacts dating back to the Chera, Pandya and Greek and Roman epochs. The ancient late-Tamil-Sangam epic Silappatikaram (c 100 AD to 300 AD at the latest) speaks of the then Chera King Cenkuttuvan receiving gifts of gold and precious stones from a certain 'Golden Temple' (Arituyil-Amardon) which is believed to be the Padmanabhaswamy Temple. Gold had been panned from rivers as well as mined in Thiruvananthapuram, Kannur, Wayanad, Kollam, Palakkad and Malappuram districts for thousands of years. The Malabar region (as a part of the "Tamilakam" region of recorded history) had several centres of trade and commerce since the Sumerian period ranging from Vizhinjam in the south to Mangalore in the north. Also, at times like the invasion by Mysore in the late 1700s, the other royal families (offshoots of the Travancore Royal Family) in Kerala and the Far-South, like the Kolathiris, took refuge in Thiruvananthapuram and stored their temple-wealth for safekeeping in the Padmanabhaswamy Temple. Also, much of the treasure housed in the much larger and as-yet-unopened vault, as well as in the much smaller cellars that have been opened, date back to long before the institution of the so-called Travancore Kingdom, e.g. the 800 kg (1,800 lb) hoard of gold coins from 200 B.C that was mentioned by Vinod Rai. Noted archaeologist and historian R. Nagaswamy has also stated that several records exist in Kerala, of offerings made to the deity, from several parts of Kerala. Lastly, in the Travancore Kingdom, a distinction was always made between the Government (State) Treasury (Karuvelam), the Royal Family Treasury (Chellam), and the Temple Treasury (Thiruvara Bhandaram or Sri Bhandaram). During the reign of Maharani Gowri Lakshmi Bayi, hundreds of temples that were mismanaged in the Kerala region, were brought under the Government. The excess ornaments in these temples were also transferred to the Vaults of the Padmanabhaswamy Temple while the funds of the Padmanabhaswamy Temple were utilised for the daily upkeep of these temples.

Prior to this now-famous incident in July 2011, one of vaults A, C, D, E or F, or one of their antechambers was opened, in 1931. This was necessitated due to the severe economic depression that India was going through then due to which the Palace and State Treasuries had run almost dry. The small group of people, including the king and the priests, found a granary-sized structure almost full with mostly gold and some silver coins and jewels. Surmounted on top of it were hundreds of pure gold pots. There were four coffers filled with gold coins as well. Also found was a larger chest fixed to the ground with six sections in it. They were full of gold jewelry encrusted with diamonds, rubies, sapphires and emeralds. Besides these, there were four more chests of old coins, and they were carried back to the Palace and state treasuries for counting.

== Litigations ==
The Kerala High Court ruled in 2011 that the state government should take over the control of the temple and its assets leading to the Travancore royal family appealing to the Supreme Court. An independent report was commissioned, and was completed in November 2012, finding no evidence that the royal family were expropriating the treasures.

The results of the inventory are not to be released until the completion of the whole process by order of the Supreme Court of India.

In April 2014, Amicus Curiae advocate Gopal Subramanium filed a 577-page report to the Supreme court of India, alleging malpractices in the administration of the temple. According to him, the authorities failed to perform their ethical duties by opening many bank accounts and trusts, and also not filing Income Tax returns for the past ten years.

The report stated: "The large amount of gold and silver, the discovery of which was a shock to the Amicus Curiae, is a singular instance of mismanagement. The alleged presence of a gold plating machine is also yet another unexplained occurrence. This discovery raises suspicion of organized extraction by people belonging to the highest echelons. There appeared to be resistance on the part of the entire State apparatus in effectively addressing the said issues. The lack of adequate investigation by the police is a telling sign that parallelism based on monarchic rule appears to predominate the social psyche though Thiruvananthapuram is a city in the State of Kerala." The Supreme court bench, comprising Justice R. M. Lodha and Justice A. K. Patnaik, ordered a change in administration by forming a 5-member committee and appointing Vinod Rai as the Auditor. The committee included Thiruvananthapuram District judge K. P. Indira, the Thantri and the Nambi of the temple, and two members to be decided in consultation with the Government of Kerala. Additionally, IAS officer and former administrator of the temple, K. N. Satish was appointed as executive officer. The Government of Kerala agreed to comply with the Supreme court order. Moolam Thirunal Rama Varma remained the trustee of the temple, and still did the ritual duties as the titular Maharaja of Travancore, but had no responsibility regarding the temple management after the interim ruling by the Supreme Court. The report also found the existence of two more vaults that were never even made mention of or hitherto spoken about. The report named them Vault 'G' and Vault 'H'. Like Vault 'B', and all its antechambers, both these vaults and their antechambers stay unopened.

The report also mentions that Gopal Subramanian found several large trunks filled with artefacts made of gold and precious stones outside of the eight vaults and their antechambers.

The CBI and the Intelligence Bureau had red-flagged the appointment of Gopal Subramanium as a Judge in the Supreme Court. The IB cited Gopal Subramaniam's report on Sree Padmanabhaswamy Temple as one of the instances where he relied heavily on his "spiritual instincts" rather than rational logic and hard facts. In his second report on Sree Padmanabhaswamy Temple, Gopal Subramaniam himself reveals that "It was his morning ritual of [shutting] his mind and seeking guidance which resulted in discoveries in this direction." The Amicus Curiae had also been accused of conducting illegal Poojas in the Temple in violation of its customs. He performed poojas at the Thevarappura in the Temple and front of the Vedavyasa Shrine. Despite opposition from the Royal Family and the Tantric priests of the Temple, he obtained a stone Yantram from the nearby Marthandam Madhom Palace, and did pooja on it for several days. The Tantris explained that the 'Yantram' had no connection with the Padmanabhaswamy Temple and that it was for the protection of the Palace. But the Amicus Curiae insisted on having it installed in the Sanctum Sanctorum of the Temple. Due to severe opposition from the Tantris, the 'Yantram' remained where it was. As per the temple's traditions, every morning, Padmanabha is to be "awakened" only by blowing the conch shell and chanting the 'Sripada Sooktham'. But the Amicus Curiae introduced the daily rendering of Venkatesa Suprabhatam to awaken the deity. The Supreme Court requested the Tantris to take the final decision on whether the Suprabhatam could be sung. Following that, the Senior Tantri Nedumpilli Tharananalloor Parameswaran Namboothiripad directed the Temple authorities to stop the chanting of Suprabhatam forthwith, as it was causing 'Anya Mantra Yajana Dosham' (affliction due to worshipping the deity with incompatible mantras) to the presiding deity and the Temple. As atonement for this error, the Tantri wanted Vedic scholars to chant 12 'muras' each, of both the Rig Veda and the Yajur Veda. In his first report to the Supreme Court, the Amicus Curiae directed the Tantris to examine whether a Sri Yantra can be installed in the Sanctum Sanctorum, in front of the processional idol.

The original petitioner (T. P. Sundararajan), whose court action led to the inventory, died in July 2011 which added credence to the folklore around the temple.

=== Final decision by Supreme Court Of India in July 2020 ===
On 13 July 2020, overturning the January 2011 judgment of the Kerala high court, the Supreme Court of India ruled that the Padmanabhaswamy Temple administration and control would be, henceforth, in the hands of the erstwhile Travancore royal family.

== See also ==
- Padmanabhaswamy Temple treasure
- Thirumal in Thiruvananthapuram
- Temples of Kerala
- Attukal Temple
- Vellayani Devi Temple
- Methan mani
