= Marthanda Varma =

Maharaja of Travancore from 1729 to 1758

- King of Travancore
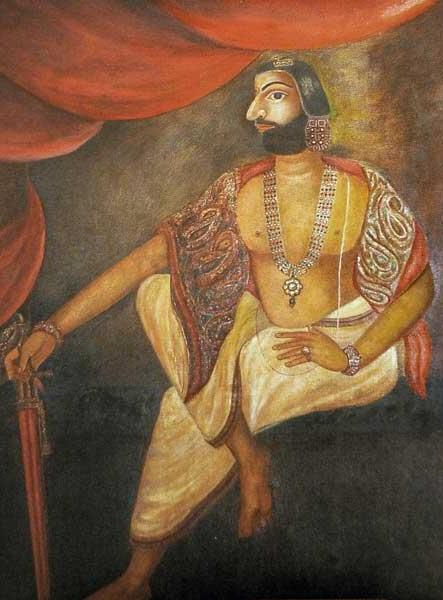
- A depiction of Marthanda Varma

Maharaja of Travancore
- Reign: 1729 – 7 July 1758
- Predecessor: Rama Varma
- Successor: Rama Varma ("Dharma Raja")
- Born: Anizham Thirunal; 1706; Attingal, Venad
- Died: 7 July 1758 (aged 51–52); Perumal Kottaram, Trivandrum Fort, Kingdom of Travancore
Regnal name
- Sri Padmanabhadasa Vanchipala Maharajah Sri Anizham Thirunal Marthanda Varma Kulasekhara Perumal
- Kulasekhara Dynasty: House Of Venad
- Father: Raghava Varma Koyil Thampuran of Kilimanoor
- Mother: Karthika Thirunal Uma Rani
- Religion: Hinduism

Anizham Thirunal Marthanda Varma (Malayalam: അനിഴം തിരുനാൾ മാർത്താണ്ഡവർമ്മ; 1706 – 7 July 1758), was the founding monarch of the southern Indian Kingdom of Travancore (previously Venadu) from 1729 until his death in 1758. He was succeeded by Rama Varma ("Dharma Raja") (1758–98).

Marthanda Varma is renowned for having defeated the Dutch East India Company forces at the Battle of Colachel in 1741. He also dismantled the Nair-Brahmin administrative setup of Ettuveetil Pillamar and the Ettara Yogam council. The Pillamars and Yogakkars aligned with the Quilon royal family of Kulashekara Perumal, did not accept the southern branches of the Venadu royal family as the legitimate rulers of Venadu, Southern Travancore (Thiruvananthapuram and Kanyakumari). These branches of the Venadu royal family traced their patrilineal origin to the Chera dynasty and are maternally related to the Kolathiri of the Mushika dynasty and the Ay royal lineage. The Yogakkars and Pillamars were always against the Royal Family to which Marthanda Varma belonged. This alliance was decisively put to an end by Marthanda Varma and he then took the full power as the king.

He then adopted a European mode of discipline for his army and expanded his kingdom northward (to what became the modern state of Travancore). He built a sizeable standing army of about 50,000 Nair men, as part of designing an "elaborate and well-organised" war machine, with the role of the Travancore army and fortified the northern boundary of his kingdom (Travancore Lines). His alliance in 1757 with the ruler of Kochi (Cochin), against the northern Kingdom of Calicut, enabled the kingdom of Kochi to survive.

Travancore under Marthanda Varma made a deliberate attempt to consolidate its power by the use of Indian Ocean trade. It was the policy of Marthanda Varma to offer assistance to Syrian Christian, Nazarene traders (as a means of limiting European involvement in ocean trade) who were also his chief funders for the Battle of Colachel and other military endeavors. The principal merchandise was black pepper, but other goods also came to be defined as royal monopoly items (requiring a license for trade) between the 1740s and the 1780s. Eventually, Travancore challenged and broke the Dutch blockade of the Kerala coast.

Thiruvananthapuram became a prominent city in Kerala under Marthanda Varma. He undertook many irrigational works, built roads and canals for communication and gave active encouragement to foreign trade. In January, 1750, Marthanda Varma decided to "donate" his kingdom to the last Tiruvadi Sri Padmanabha (Vishnu) and thereafter rule as the deity's "vice-regent" (Sri Padmanabha Dasa). Marthanda Varma's policies were continued in large measure by his successor, Rama Varma ("Dharma Raja").

== Early life ==
Marthanda Varma was born in 1706 to queen Karthika Thirunal Umadevi, the Queen of Attingal, and Raghava Varma of Kilimanoor Palace, the southern branch of Travancore Royal family. Queen Karthika Thirunal Uma Devi - an adoptee from the northern Kolathunadu ruling family - was the senior queen of Attingal at the time. His father Raghava Varma Koil Thampuran died of severe fever when Marthanda Varma was one year old.

Marthanda Varma was the nephew of the last Venadu king, Rama Varma. At the time of Varma's birth, Trippappur Swaroopam (later Thiruvithamkoor or Travancore) was a small chiefdom extending from Edava in the north to Aralvaimozhi under the Venadu Kingdom. Venadu Kingdom was split into small feudal regions ruled and controlled by the Nair Aristocracy.

Raja Rama Varma died in 1729. According to the matrilineal system of inheritance of Kerala, the next king would be Marthanda Varma. However, a problem cropped up when two of his cousins, Valiya Thampi and Kunju Thampi, who were sons of Raja Rama Varma, claimed the throne under the earlier patriarchal succession of Kshatriyas. Some historians note that these thampis are sons of Rama Varma and a Rajput woman named Abhirami, while some believe he is of Bengali or Tamil noble Devadasi who followed patriarchal. The Thampis requested the help of Ettuveettil Pillamar, the Nair Aristocracy who controlled the regions near Padmanabhaswamy Temple, along with their associates Yogakkar (comprising Malayali Brahmins and Nairs representative from Venadu).

Pillamar were extremely influential in Venadu, and had more power than the kings themselves. Even the kings needed their permission to make decisions in Venadu. This conflict between Varma and the Thampis later resulted in severe consequences. In the aftermath, Marthanda Varma and his family lived in fear, many of his relatives were killed, they hide and moved from place to place, seeking refuge in various places with the help of several Nair Tharavads.

Marthanda Varma's brother in law and his sister travelled through Budhanoor, which was under the protection of Vattaparambil Valiathan, when they were attacked by the Ettuveettil. Marthanda Varma's brother-in-law and other fighters lost their lives, but the sister, the Rani of Attingal, and her son managed to escape and ran through the fields ("Budhanoor padam"). They were helped by Aaruveettil Madampimar and the king of Vanjipuzha.

In 1729, Marthanda Varma planned his first attack with the help of powerful mercenaries from outside Kerala, but it ultimately failed. Later, he expanded his army, ascended to the throne and killed his cousins, the Thampis. Utilizing spies, Marthanda Varma analyzed the movements and secrets of the Ettuveetil Pillamar, eventually defeating them and executing most of their family members. He later destroyed the power of more than 70 nobles across Venadu. Yogakkar and Brahmins who earlier supported Ettuveetil Nairs were expelled from Venadu. Marthanda Varma later expanded his territory by attacking Quilon (north Venadu), Tekkumkoor, and Vadakkumkur, and eventually formed the Travancore Kingdom.

=== Impact ===
- Decentralized state (complex feudal and political relations). Influence of the local land lords (the Ettuveetil Pillamar) and the barons (landlords known as Madampimar). The authority of the throne was also curbed by the Council of Eight and a Half (the Yogakkar), the managing committee of the Padmanabhaswamy Temple. There was no standing army.
- European monopoly in Indian Ocean spice trade. The constant Dutch blockade of the Malabar Coast. Trade with the Europeans was an important source for augmenting the financial reserves of the Kerala kingdoms.
- Quarrels and open warfare among the various royal lineages (increased the dependence of the royals on their warriors and collectors of dues). Trade rivalries between the Dutch and English companies had a role in intensifying the conflict among the branches.

An English East India Company factory was established at Vizhinjam in 1644. The Ajengo Fort was established in 1695. The ruler Rama Varma (1721/22 - 1729) entered into treaties with the English East India Company (1723) and the Madurai Nayaks with the aim of strengthening his position (in the fight against the nobles and other hostile elements in Tranvancore). The role played by Marthanda Varma in these moves are highlighted by P. Shungoonny Menon, the 19th-century Travancore court historian. The Dutch Company positioned themselves against the emerging Travancore by helping Quilon and Kayamkulam. The English Company became an ally of Travancore against the Dutch.

== Rule of Marthanda Varma ==
Mobilisation of additional resources involved territorial conquests...The territorial conquests of Marthanda Varma were intended not only for settling political differences but also for controlling areas that yielded food crops and commercial products, particularly pepper for the ports of trade in southern and central Kerala...The reorganisation of land relations effected by Marthanda Varma following his conquest of Quilon, Kayamkulam, Tekkenkur and Vadakkenkur was essentially to ensure this control of resources.

— K. N. Ganesh, historian, in "The Process of State Formation in Travancore" (1990)

Marthanda Varma ascended the throne when the crisis in Travancore had already deepened. Raja Rama Varma was forced to invite troops from Tamil Nadu to collect dues and impose order. Even the Padmanabhaswamy Temple affairs were heading towards a crisis due to lack of funds. The Thampi brothers, sons of Rama Varma, immediately revolted against Marthanda Varma (who was the legitimate successor on the basis of the Nair matrilineal system) with the assistance of a Tamil army.

Marthanda Varma's reign was one of constant warfare, against opponents both inside and outside his territory. After reducing the power of the Ettuveetil Pillamar, the Nair aristocracy, and their associates, the Yogakkars, Marthanda Varma turned his attention to central Kerala. He realised that Dutch power in Kerala stemmed from their flourishing spice trade at the port of Kochi. He set out to conquer the major spice-producing areas supplying cargo to Kochi. After declaring a state monopoly on pepper in Travancore in 1743, between then and 1752, the king annexed Quilon, Kayamkulam, Thekkumkur, Vadakkumkur and Purakkad to Travancore (thereby delivering a serious blow to the commerce of the Dutch).

- In 1731, the port of Kollam (Quilon) - which was ruled by a branch of the Venadu family to which Marthanda Varma also belonged - was defeated and its last chief was made to sign a treaty allowing the annexation of his chiefdom by Travancore after his death. The chief was brought to Thiruvananthapuram and lodged almost as a state prisoner in the Valikoikkal Palace. A contingent of the Travancore army under Dalavay Arumukham Pillai was stationed at Kollam.
- Marthanda Varma next turned his attention towards the little chiefdom of Marta and seized it. The neighbouring chiefdom of Kayamkulam - sensing an imminent invasion by Travancore - soon allied itself with Kochi, Purakkad and Vadakkumkur. The Kayamkulam chief was also successful in rescuing the Kollam chief from his Thiruvananthapuram prison. The allies built new fortifications and strengthened their defences against the threat of Travancore. The Dutch East India Company also professed to support the war effort.
- The subsequent invasion of Marta by the Kayamkulam chief signalled the outbreak of the war. The Travancore army seized Nedumangadu and Kottarakkara and prevented the joined forces of Elayadathu and Kayamkulam. Travancore Dalavay Ramayyan then lead an expeditionary force to capture the city of Kollam. But, he was forced to withdraw without accomplishing his mission.
- Having equipped their forces with the help of the French and the English Companies, Travancore renewed a military operation against the chief of Kollam. In the campaigns that ensued, the ruler of Kayamkulam was killed (1734). But the defense of Kollam continued under the leadership of the brother of the deceased chief and Travancore forces were forced to fall back once again.
- Travancore's next campaign was against Elayadathu Swaroopam (Kottarakara). When the chief of Kottarakara who was kept in solitary confinement in Thiruvananthapuram died in 1739, Marthanda Varma refused to recognise the claim of the senior female member to succession. The princess fled to Thekkumkur where the chief gave granted her asylum. At this juncture, the Dutch Governor of Ceylon Gustaaf Willem van Imhoff sensed an opportunity to involve further in the politics of Kerala.
- In 1739, van Imhoff arrived in Kochi, took up the cause of the female ruler of Kottarakara and protested against the annexation of that chiefdom by Marthanda Varma in a meeting between the two. In 1741, the Dutch reinstated the female ruler of Kottarakara against the wishes of Marthanda Varma, who attacked the chiefdom and defeated the combined Kottarakkara - Dutch forces before finally fully annexing the chiefdom to Travancore while the female ruler fled to Kochi.

=== Battle of Colachel (1741) ===
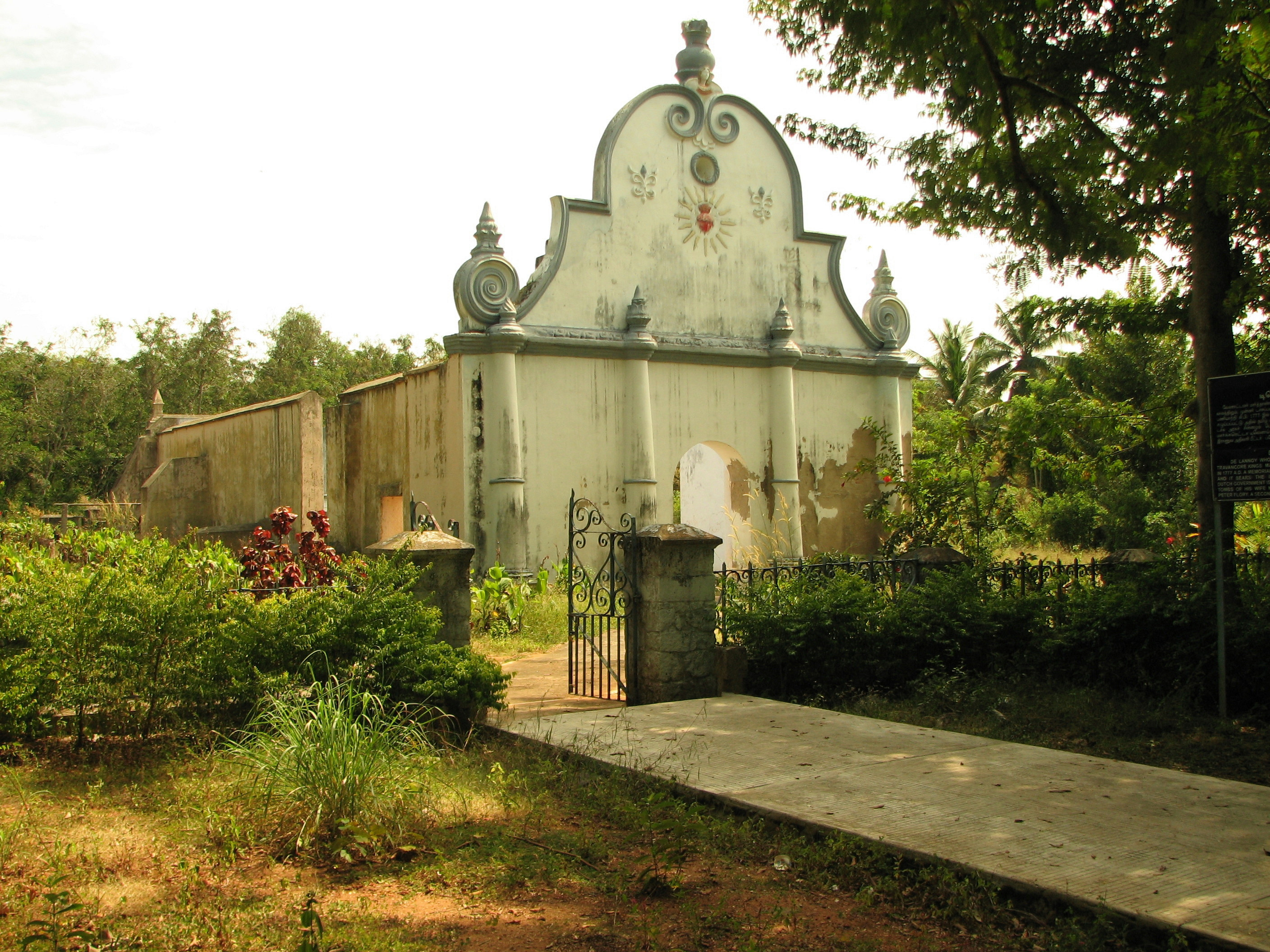
The chapel at Udayagiri Fort, Kanyakumari. Eustachius de Lannoy's tomb is located in the chapel cemetery.

Travancore then launched a series of raids on the Dutch forts in the area and captured them all. In retaliation, a Dutch artillery force landed at Colachel from Ceylon and conquered up to Kottar. The Dutch forces then advanced against Kalkulam, Travancore's capital. Marthanda Varma, who was then in the north of his state promptly marched his forces to the south and arrived at Kalkulam just in time to prevent its fall to the Dutch.

In the following battle at Colachel (10 August 1741), the Travancore forces won a resounding victory over the Dutch. More than twenty Dutch were taken as prisoners of war from Colachel. Among them was Eustachius de Lannoy, who attracted the king's special notice. Eustachius de Lannoy, commonly known in Travancore as the 'Valiya Kappittan' (Senior Captain) was entrusted with the organisation and drilling of a special regiment, which he did to the "entire satisfaction of the king". De Lannoy was raised to the rank of general in Travancore army and proved of considerable service to Marthanda Varma in subsequent battles.

=== Treaty of Mavelikkara (1753) ===
- Following the expulsion of the Dutch, Marthanda Varma now turned his attention once again towards Kayamkulam (which continued to seek help from the Dutch Company). In 1742, Travancore forces attacked Kayamkulam possessions at Kollam and fought the Kayamkulam army led by Achuta Warrier and chiefs from Valiya Kakkanadu Madhom. Although Travancore was defeated in this battle, Marthanada Varma reinforced his army with cavalry brought in from Tirunelveli before mounting an attack on Kayamkulam, which led to the final defeat of the chiefdom. A treaty known as the Treaty of Mannar (1742) was signed, under which Kayamkulam became a tributary state of Travancore.
- However, by 1746, the Kayamkulam chief once again showed signs of rebellion and when his "conspiracies" with the northern chiefdoms such as Kottayam, Changanassery, Kochi and Ambalapuzha came to the attention of Marthanda Varma, Kayamkulam was annexed by a final battle in which the chief fled to Kochi and a branch of the family settled near Charamood known as "Moothantedom". Travancore now extended from Kanyakumari to Kayamkulam in the north.
- Following this, Ambalapuzha, Kottayam and Changanassery were also annexed to Travancore by 1753. The principality of Meenachil was also annexed.
- In 1753, the tributary states of Kochi collectively known as Karappuram and Alangad were ceded to Travancore. In 1755, the ruler of Kozhikode was also defeated at a battle in Purakkad. He was supported by the armies of some other local chiefs.

The ascent of Travancore seems to have been particularly rapid after about 1749. Marthanda Varma had declared a state monopoly on pepper in Travancore in 1743, thereby delivering a serious blow to the commerce of the Dutch. A treaty (the Treaty of Mavelikkara) was concluded between Marthanda Varma and the Dutch East India Company. It was signed at Mavelikkara on 15 August 1753. Thereafter, the Dutch Company officials report that "considerable spice producing lands came under direct royal control, while those merchants participating in illegal trade in spices stood in danger of being executed".

== Administration ==
- Use of maritime outlets: Marthanda Varma made a determined bid to consolidate his authority by the use of Indian Ocean spice trade. The control of ocean trade was crucial for the statecraft of 18th century India. Travancore challenged and eventually broke the Dutch blockade of the southern Malabar Coast.
- Royal monopoly (the Kuttakam): a number of traded goods such as black pepper were defined as royal monopoly items. These items required a state licence for trade in Travancore.
- Dismantling of the old aristocracy - complete restructuring of the medieval political framework: Marthanda Varma reduced the power of the Nair aristocracy (especially the Ettuveettil Pillamar, and their associates, the Yogakkar of the Padmanabhaswamy Temple) in Travancore. Kings of Kerala had earlier been dependent militarily on these powerful community of nobles.
- Patronage to Syrian Christians: To limit the European involvement in trade, Marthanda Varma extended his patronage to the ancient mercantile community in Kerala. The Syrian Christians soon enhanced their position as landholders and those who controlled the new monopoly.
- Extensive bureaucratisation : a Dalava was appointed to head the military, fiscal and commercial administration. Below the Dalava was established an extensive hierarchy, from the Valia Sarvadhi Kariakkars to the Kariakkars, Manikars and Adhikaris. Upper positions of this new system was dominated by Brahmins effectively reduce the Nairs influences in the administration. The old Pandara Kariakkar and Swarupi Janam were replaced by a new administrative system. Divisions known as Adhikaram and Mandapattu Vatukkal were introduced.
  - Dalavas under Marthanda Varma
    - Arumukham Pillai 1729–1736
    - Thanu Pillai 1736–1737
    - Ramayyan Dalavay 1737–1756
    - Marthanda Pillai 1756–1758
- Military machine: a substantial standing army, roughly estimated at 50,000, was created. The soldiers were mainly ordinary Nairs who received tax concessions (the Irayili) for the period under service and a pension (the Irayili Aduthoon) on retirement. Marava Cavalry and Pathan Cavalry was also used by Marthanda Varma. Assistance from some defected Dutch officers were also received (after the victory at Colachel). With the beginning of the conflict against Quilon and Kayamkulam (who were being supplied arms by the Dutch), supply of English arms and ammunition also began to increase. Artillery batteries were positioned facing the Arabian Sea from Purakkad to Cape Comorin. Construction of intricate fortifications in Travancore, including the Travancore Lines.
- Expansion of agricultural production: development of water harvesting and irrigation projects, and the so-called "Kulikkanam" tenure. The Kulikkanam was applicable to "newly planted trees and freshly sown lands", where a tax reductions (the Naduvukkur and Vettalivu) were granted. The tenure was found along with the Otti tenure, similar to the Kanam tenure (found elsewhere in Kerala). A number of commercial crops were cultivated in lands under this tenure. The Kulikkanam cultivators usually went to the market to sell their goods for cash (and hence the Kulikkanam dues were collected as cash).
- The basis for the changes in the political and economic relations was provided by the transformation of the old agrarian relations. Extensive land survey and settlement.

== Culture and religion ==
Marthanda Varma was born into a Nair subcaste family, belonging to the Mushika lineage of northern Kerala through his maternal line, and his family was earlier adopted into the Venadu Samantha Kshatriya royal family, both families followed the matrilineal succession (Marumakkathayam) system. Therefore, he inherited his mother's caste the Mushika lineage of Nair caste, wanting the status of a (Samantha Kshatriya), he performed a set of elaborate and expensive Mahadana rituals as which included the Hiranyagarbha. Marthanda Varma started normalising the relationship between the royal family (the ruler) and the Padmanabhaswamy Temple (the administrative body of the temple) as soon as he came to the throne. He undertook the Prayaschittam retribution that was long overdue from the earlier Venadu kings. He reorganized the collection of dues from the temple lands. After the land survey of 1739–40, the allotment of expenses for the temple was fixed.

Padmanabhaswamy Temple in Thiruvananthapuram was re-created as the gigantic structure of today and new state ceremonies such as Murajapam, Bhadra Deepam, and others were introduced by Marthanda Varma. The main Vishnu idol of the shrine, which was mostly destroyed in a fire during his predecessor Rama Varma's time, was also re-constructed. He also created Ottakkal Mandapam as well as the Sheevelippura. Out of the seven floors of the temple gopura, five were finished during his reign.

Thiruvananthapuram became a prominent city in Kerala under Marthanda Varma. As a result of the annexation of neighbouring chiefdoms, the artists and scholars from these places migrated to Thiruvananthapuram, turning it into a cultural centre. Marthanda Varma gave patronage to different temple art forms including Koothu, Padhakam, Kathakali, Thullal, and Koodiyattam. Noted artists such as Ramapurathu Warrier and Kunchan Nambiar amongst others served as his court poets.

== Thrippadidanam ==
In 1749–50, Marthanda Varma decided to "donate" his realm to Sri Padmanabha (Vishnu) and thereafter rule as the deity's "vice-regent" (Sri Padmanabha Dasa).

=== Purpose of Thrippadidanam ===
- Separation of the newly formed "unitary kingship" (and political power) from the disputes and frictions in the civil society.
- Formalisation of the new power structure in Travancore.
- To integrate the existing social divisions in Kerala under the emerging power structure.

== Death ==
Ramayyan Dalawa, prime minister and a close friend of Marthanda Varma, died in 1756. Ramayyan's death caused terrible grief to Marthada Varma, and he died two years later in 1758. He was succeeded by his nephew Rama Varma ("Dharma Raja"). Marthanda Varma's policies were continued in large measure by Dharma Raja (1758–98). He went on to successfully defend Travancore against the aggression of the Kingdom of Mysore. Marthanda Varma's legacy involved a major restructuring of the medieval political and economic relations of southern Kerala.

== In popular culture ==
=== Fiction ===
- Marthanda Varma is a principal character in C.V. Raman Pillai's 1891 historical romance novel Marthandavarma
- Marthanda Varma is the protagonist of the historical fiction Travancore King - The Legend of Marthanda Varma by Shubendra

Marthanda Varma Venadu Kulasekhara dynasty Born: 1706 Died: 1758
Regnal titles
Preceded by Rama Varma (as King of Venadu)	King of Travancore; 1729–1758	Succeeded by Rama Varma (Dharma Raja)
