= Ettara Yogam =

Temple in India

The Ettara Yogam or, the King and Council of Eight and a Half, has been the administrative setup of Sri Padmanabhaswamy Temple, Thiruvananthapuram, Kerala, India, for centuries.

== Origin ==
According to historians, a six-member Sabha was constituted to run the Temple in 1045 AD. This Sabha was later known as Thiruvaananthapurathu Sabha. The Pushpanjali Swamiyar, though not a member of the Sabha, presides over all its meetings. The Secretary to the Sabha is known as the Sabhanjithan. The decision taken by the Sabha can be implemented only if the Ruler of Venad approves of it. This administrative setup consisting of the Arachan (Ruler) of Venad, Pushpanjali Swamiyar, six-member Sabha and Sabhanjithan is called Ettara Yogam.

Popular legend takes the origin of Ettara Yogam way back to Dvapara Yuga. Lord Parasurama installed the Idol of Sri Padmanabhaswamy and entrusted the administration of the Temple with Koopakkara Potti, Vanchiyoor Athiyara Potti, Kollur Athiyara Potti, Muttavila Potti, Karuva Potti, Neythasseri Potti and Srikaryathu Potti. King Adithya Vikrama of Vanchi (Venad) was directed by Parasurama to protect the Temple. Sri Padmanabhaswamy Temple became the Kula Daivam (Tutelary Deity) of the Royal Family of Venad.

According to historians, a six-member Sabha was constituted to run the Temple in 225 ME. This Sabha was later known as Thiruvaananthapurathu Sabha. The Pushpanjali Swamiyar, though not a member of the Sabha, presides over all its meetings. The Secretary to the Sabha is known as the Sabhanjithan. The decision taken by the Sabha can be implemented only if the Ruler of Venad approves of it. This administrative setup consisting of the Arachan (Ruler) of Venad, Pushpanjali Swamiyar, six-member Sabha and Sabhanjithan is called Ettara Yogam.

== Members ==
7 Bhramins, one Nair family representative and half was Maharaja.

A Sannyasin from Naduvil Madhom or Munchira Madhom presides over the meetings of the Sabha. He is called Pushpanjali Swamiyar as he performs floral worship to Lord Sri Padmanabha daily. The Swamiyar can hold office during the pleasure of the Crown. The members of the Sabha were:

- 1. Koopakkara Potti
- 2. Athiyara Potti of Vanchiyoor
- 3. Athiyara Potti of Kollur
- 4. Muttavila Potti
- 5. Karuva Potti
- 6. Neythasseri Potti
- 7. Karanatta Kurup or Azhakath Kurup, the Nair nobleman

The Azhakathu Kurup family represents the Nairs in the Ettara Yogam. Srikaryathu Potti is the Sabhanjithan or Secretary to the Sabha. Important decisions taken by the Sabha could be implemented only if the Raja of Venad/ Travancore approved of them. Kshetrakaryam Potti also known as Adhikara Padartham represents the Raja of Venad/ Travancore during sessions of Ettara Yogam. Desies, Karanatha Kurup, Karanakkanakku and Pandarakkanakku attend its meetings. It is to be understood that Kshetrakaryam Potti, Desies, Karanatha Kurup of the Palliyadi family, Karanakkanakku and Pandarakkanakku are not members of Ettara Yogam. The Palliyadi Kurup was the security chief of the Temple. Before Marthanda Varma, the "ettara yogam"- 8 1/2 council, was composed of 8 Nair families (8 veettil pillamar) and the king (half representation). But after Marthanda Varma devastated the 8 Nair families and their generations, (by killing the males and selling the females as slaves, by diminishing their palaces- making them pools. In Malayalam there is an idiom - "kulam thonduka"- meaning digging the pool - after this) the 8 counsil was given to Brahmins who helped him. Thus the ettara yogam became 7 Brahmins+ 1 Nair+ 1/2 king. Now the Padmnabha swamy temple is completely belongs to them. Ancient times, the Nagavamshis (Nairs) belongs to the people of Ananta Shesha, who is inside the temple with Vishnu.

According to another version, the Pushpanjali Swamiyar and the six main Potties had one vote each in deciding the matters of the Temple. Besides them, the Maharajah of Venad or Travancore, the Srikaryathu Potti and the Karanavar of the Palliyadi family (Nair representative) had half vote each.

The membership of the Ettara Yogam (other than the Pushpanjali Swamiyar) is passed hereditarily and the member families are represented by the senior most male member therein.

== Ettuveetil Pillamar ==
The Sri Padmanabhaswamy Temple possessed vast landed areas over which the ruler of Travancore had no control whatsoever. These lands were divided into eight adhikarems or districts and over each of these districts as a governor was placed a noble Nair family, all with the title of Pillai. Hence they came to be known as the Ettuveetil Pillamar or the Lords of the Eight Houses.The confederacy of these Pillamar was eventually destroyed in the 18th century by Maharajah Anizhom Thirunal Marthanda Varma. The Pillamar were organised into a confederacy in the 17th century.

== Erosion of authority ==
Owing to the large amount of power vested in their hands, the Ettuveetil Pillamar became highly arrogant. The Pillamar conspired against the royal house and several murders and other acts of atrocity were committed owing to the powerlessness of the Sovereign. Eventually Maharajah Anizhom Thirunal Marthanda Varma (1706–1758) decided to put an end to their power and destroyed the Pillamar. The confederacy of the Pillamar was dismissed and the member families were banished from Travancore. From the time of Marthanda Varma the authority of Yogathu Pottimar eroded and the Temple came under the direct control of the Maharajahs of Travancore.

== Ettara Yogam in modern times ==
According to the 1998 book, Sree Padmanabha Swamy Temple, written by Princess Aswathi Thirunal Gowri Lakshmi Bayi, the Ettarayogam still exists in principle.

For the last few hundred years, seven Ettarayogam Potti families have continued to receive requests from the Padmanabhaswamy Temple authorities for anujna (permission) to conduct festivals–for example in 2011. When the Karuva Potty family was without an heir (the Karumadom colony land and nearby areas like Kuriathy belonged to the Karuva potty family), the Muttavila Potty got the title of Karuva potty, and also the title: Sarwaswadana Dattu. Neythasseri potti inherited the power after marrying from Koovalasseri (which also perished without an heir) and later settled in Thiruvananthapuram. The request for giving permission to conduct rituals like Arattu to the Karuva Potty is still given to Muttavila Potty in addition to the one due to Muttavila Potty.

After the Alpashi and Painkuni festivals every year, the Dakshina is given to Tantri Tharananallur Nambuthiripad by these Potti families.

With the passing away of Sri Uthradom Thirunal Marthanda Varma in December 2013, his nephew Sri Moolam Thirunal Rama Varma became the titular Maharaja of Travancore in January 2014. Like his predecessors, Sri Moolam Thirunal also got concurrence from the Ettara Yogam before assuming the title 'Maharaja'. In the presence of the Maharaja designate, the Yogathil Pottimar and the Tantri, the Pushpanjali Swamiyar Maravanchery Thekkedathu Neelakanta Bharatikal signed on the Neettu (Order) of the Ettara Yogam giving recognition to Sri Moolam Thirunal as Chirava Mooppan (Maharaja of Travancore) and Thrippappoor Mooppan (Protector of Sri Padmanabhaswamy Temple). This ceremony took place at Kulasekhara Mandapam in Sri Padmanabhaswamy Temple.

== See also ==
- Marthanda Varma
- Ettuveetil Pillamar
- Pazhaya Sreekanteswaram Temple
- Padmanabhapuram
- Travancore
- Venad
