= Enayam Puthenthurai =

Enayam Puthenthurai Enayam Puthenthurai Puthenthurai
- Village
- Nickname: Puthenthuari
- Enayam Location in Tamil Nadu, India
- Coordinates: 8°13′02″N 77°11′17″E
- Country: India
- State: Tamil Nadu
- District: Nagercoil

Government
  - Type: Panchayat
  - Body: Panchayat
- Elevation: 29 m (95 ft)

Population
  - Total: 13,097

Languages
  - Official: தமிழ்
- Time zone: UTC+5:30 (IST)
- Postal code: 629193

Enayam is a village in Killiyoor Block, located within the Kanyakumari District of Tamil Nadu State of India.

== Location ==
Enayam is located 32 kilometres (20 mi) west of district capital Nagercoil and 741.5 kilometres (460.7 mi) from the state capital, Chennai. Villages near Enayam Puthenthurai include Thengapattanam (3 kilometres (1.9 mi)), Midalam (4.75 kilometres (2.95 mi)), Painkulam (5 kilometres (3.1 mi)), Killiyur (6 kilometres (3.7 mi)), Thoothoor (7 kilometres (4.3 mi)), and Paloor (7 kilometres (4.3 mi)). Karungal, Kollankodu and Unnamalaikadai are other nearby cities.

The village is bordered by the Munchira and Melpuram Blocks in the north and the Thackalai and Thiruvattar Blocks in the east. It sits near the border of the Kanniyakumari District and Thiruvananthapuram District. It is located on the coast of the Arabian Sea. Enayam Puthenthurai's village code is 227646 and its postal code is 629193. Its postal head office is in Keezhkulam.

== Demographics ==
As per the 2011 census of India, Enayam village has a total population of 20,000 people, including 13,000 males and 7,000 females.

The main languages spoken in the village are Tamil and English.

== Enayam Gram panchayat ==
The Enayam Gram panchayat (village jury) consists of the Enayam Puthenthurai, Enayam Chinnathurai, Enayam, Helen Nager, and Ramanthurai villages. The Panchayat president is Mary Mallika Vimal Raj from Enayam Puthenthurai. In ancient times, there was a small church with a cross ("Thiruchiluvai Chitrālayam") believed to have existed in Enayam. It is thought that this church might have been built by Portuguese sailors who traveled by sea. Supporting this belief are the grand cross structure still standing on the deep-sea rock and another cross that stands upright onshore, directly aligned with it.

The Enayam Parish, which now includes areas such as Mullurthurai, Ramanthurai, Enayam-Puthanthurai, Helen Nagar, and Melmidalam, was established in 1870. During the time of Rev. Fr. Lawrence Perera, who served from 1930 to 1938, renovation work on the church was undertaken. The work was completed by Fr. Devadhasan.

Later, a new church named St. Helena's Church was founded in 1978 by Fr. Dionysius, and construction was completed on 01-10-1990 by Fr. Joseph Benedict. The church was then consecrated by Bishop Leon A. Dharmaraj.

== Enayam International Seaport project ==
The Enayam International Seaport is a proposed project planning to reclaim 500 acres (200 ha) of land from the sea in three phases.

The proposed port would have the capacity to handle around two million metric tons (2,000,000 long tons; 2,200,000 short tons) of cargo a year and would gradually be upgraded to process eight million metric tons (7,900,000 long tons; 8,800,000 short tons) a year. The project was put on hold by the state and the central governments as it could affect the livelihood of the local people. Initially, the suggestion was to build the project in the Colachel or the Enayam area.

For the last three decades, locals have been requesting that the government build a fishing harbor, but the plans to construct a cargo harbor have not changed.
