= Battle of Colachel =

1741 battle of the Travancore-Dutch War

- Part of the Travancore-Dutch War
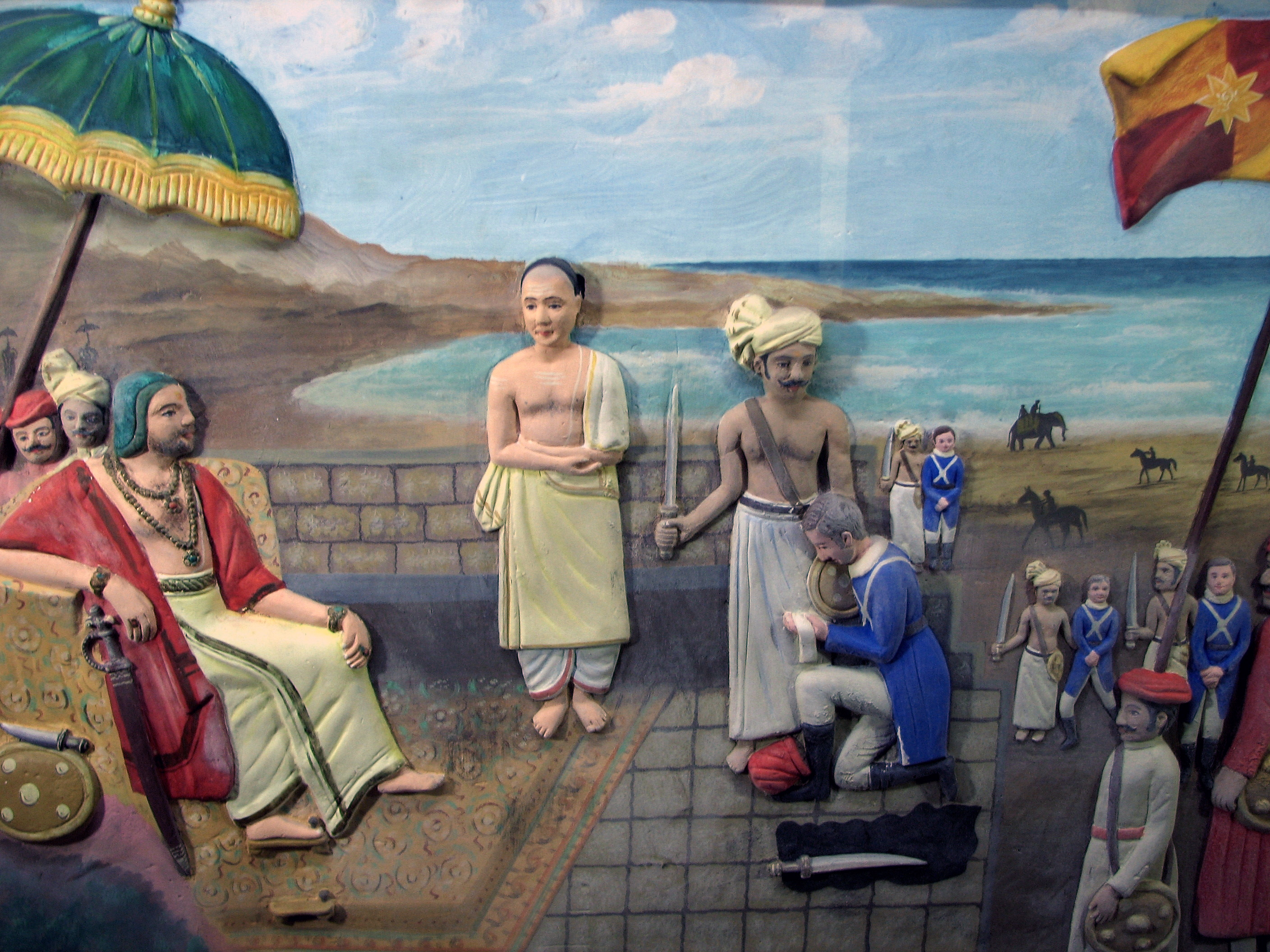
- Eustachius De Lannoy surrendering to Raja Marthanda Varma at the Battle of Colachel.
Date	10 August 1741
Location	Colachel, Travancore, Malabar Coast (present-day India, Tamil Nadu) 8.17°N 77.24°E
Result	Travancore victory

Belligerents
Travancore	Dutch Republic: Dutch East India Company

Commanders and leaders
Marthanda Varma; Ramayyan Dalawa	(Dutch East India Company) Eustachius De Lannoy (POW) (Dutch East India Company) Donadi (POW) (Dutch East India Company) Duyvenschot (POW)

Casualties and losses
Negligible	24 officials were taken as POWs: Muskets, swords, and cannons were captured

The Battle of Colachel (or The Battle of Kolachel) was fought on 10 August 1741 [O.S. 31 July 1741] between the Indian kingdom of Travancore and the Dutch East India Company. During the Travancore-Dutch War, King Marthanda Varma's (1729–1758) forces defeated the Dutch East India Company's forces led by Admiral Eustachius De Lannoy on 10 August 1741. Travancore triumphed in the war with the military efforts of the Travancore army at land and fishermen community at sea. The war marked the beginning of the long-standing conflicts and negotiations that later became known as the Travancore–Dutch War.

== Background ==
In the early 18th century, the Malabar Coast region of present-day Kerala was divided among several smaller kingdoms. In the 1730s, Marthanda Varma, the ruler of Travancore, adopted an expansionist policy, and conquered several territories from these small states. This threatened the interests of the Dutch East India Company's command at Malabar, whose spice trade depended on procurement of spices from these states. Marthanda Varma and his vassals refused to honor the monopoly contracts that the Dutch had with the states annexed by Travancore, adversely affecting the Dutch trade in Malabar.

In January 1739, Gustaaf Willem van Imhoff, the Dutch Governor of Ceylon, visited Kochi, and in a July report, he recommended military action to save the Dutch colonization of Malabar. Later that year, the Dutch organized an alliance of the rulers of Kochi, Thekkumkur, Vadakkumkur, Purakkad, Kollam, and Kayamkulam. Van Imhoff personally met Marthanda Varma to negotiate peace, threatening to wage war against Travancore if the Dutch terms were not accepted, but Marthanda Varma dismissed the threat, and replied that he had been thinking about invading Europe some day.

In late 1739, the Dutch command at Malabar declared war on Travancore, without obtaining permission or waiting for reinforcements from Batavia. The Dutch deployed a detachment of soldiers from Ceylon against Travancore, under the command of Captain Johannes Hackert. They and their allies achieved several military successes in the initial campaign. In November, the allied army forced the Travancore army stationed near Kollam to retreat, and advanced up to Tangasseri. The British East India Company chief at Anchuthengu congratulated the Dutch on their victory, and requested them to leave their establishment at Edava in peace.

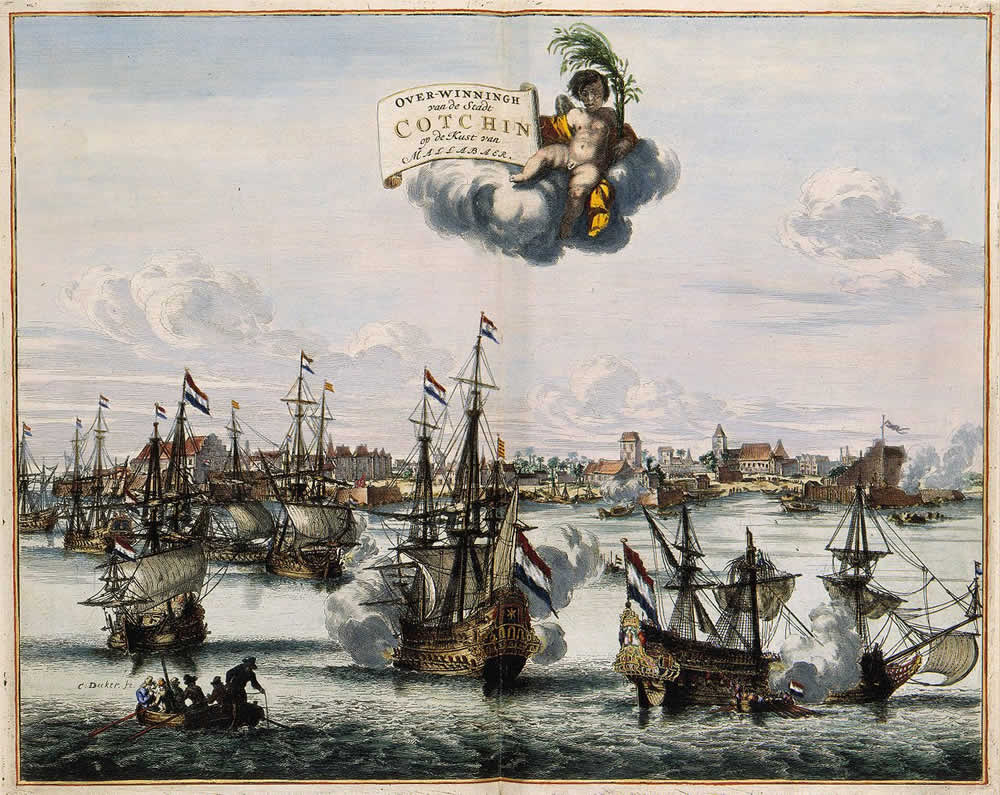
Dutch East India Company

By early December, the Dutch and their allies marched towards Attingal and Varkala. When the Travancore army withdrew to check an invasion by Chanda Sahib of Arcot in the south, the allies achieved further military successes. However, the Dutch decided to wait for reinforcements from Ceylon before waging further war against Travancore.

In November 1740, the Dutch command in Malabar asked for reinforcements from Ceylon, and launched a second campaign against Travancore. The Travancore force turned against the Dutch possessions, captured Dutch outposts in Travancore, attacked the factories, and took possession of the goods stored. While matters were thus in the north, small reinforcement forces numbering 105 and 70, which the Dutch Governor had called from Ceylon, effected a landing at Colachel.

== Dutch occupation of Colachel ==
On 26 November, the Dutch sent two large ships and three sloops to Colachel, bombarding the coast. The Dutch soldiers fortified a place near the port with wooden posts and garrisoned a portion of the Dutch force in it. The rest proceeded and attacked the Travancore outposts on the coast, such as Thengapattanam, Midalam, Kadiapattinam and advanced to Eraniel. On 29 November, the Dutch commander Van Gollenesse announced a complete blockade of the Travancore coast around Colachel, directing his forces to seize all ships bound for the coast, with the exception of the English ships carrying goods to Edava.

On 13 January 1741, the Dutch ship Maarseveen was sent southwards, to be anchored between Thengapattanam and Colachel. On 10 February, another Dutch expedition comprising seven large ships and several smaller vessels landed just north of Colachel.

To effectively control the newly conquered territories, the Dutch were expecting reinforcements to arrive from Ceylon and Batavia, but the Company Government at Batavia could not spare any reserve forces because of the Java War. Faced with an acute shortage of Dutch soldiers in Malabar, Van Gollenesse requested at least 300-400 men from the Dutch Ceylon, and meanwhile, sent a section of the Dutch army to Kanyakumari to attack Travancore.

The Marakayars played a major role in defeating the Dutch East India company entering into Colachel port. De Lannoy's research text from the University of Leiden in Netherlands has records of Marakayar community and their people who played a major role in defeating the Dutch Ships and taking Dutch soldiers hostage.

== Siege of Colachel ==
When Marthanda Varma reached Kalkulam, he adopted measures to counteract the progress of the Dutch, who had captured almost all the villages between Colachel and Kottar, and were intending to attack Padmanabhapuram, the capital of Travancore. The Raja raised a levy of 2000 Nairs to reinforce the regular infantry already in service in that part of the country. Marthanda Varma strongly remonstrated with the Dutch Governor of Cochin and wrote to the Government in Batavia a letter of remonstrance and complaint.

King Marthanda Varma sought help in the war from the local Mukkuvar leaders. They agreed to the king's request, and many sea divers in Mukkuvars were used at night to sink the few Dutch ships which were anchored in Colachel. After the victory of the Colachel war, a local fishing village was named Marthandam Thura, and King Marthanda Varma helped to construct a new church there.

De Lannoy's research text from the University of Leiden in Netherlands had references to the Mukkuvar in Colachel. First, he made it clear that however much the Dutch tried, the 'mukkuvars' did not betray the Travancore king. As the Dutch approached the shore, the Travancore army had made a retreat, and the locals fled the area. It was not enough for the Dutch to simply bombard a place and then barge in; to continue the war they required fortifications, trenches, and makeshift sheds and storerooms. The Dutch captain wanted his generals to talk to the Mukkuvar community in the most peaceful manner and get them on their side. They wanted the 'mukkuvars' for the work on the fortifications, and also for local support. Pots of money were offered, but the fishermen refused. The Dutch then approached the local Jesuit priests to get the fishermen on board. De Lannoy writes that the Jesuits told the Dutch point blank that the fishermen would not betray their king.

In retaliation, the Jesuit church in Colachel was bombarded by the Dutch. A priest was killed, and three were abducted and taken to a Dutch ship to be tortured. The second reference reveals how members of the 'mukkuvar' community delayed Dutch reinforcements from reaching Colachel. A small mail boat with an officer and a few mukkuvar men was sent to the Kanyakumari Dutch camp to fetch reinforcements. De Lannoy writes that the fisherman toppled the boat and took the officer to the Travancore camp. The fishermen were also instrumental in tricking many unsuspecting Dutch soldiers who were shipped in as reinforcements to march straight into the mouth of the Travancore army. It was some of these trapped Dutch soldiers who gave the Travancore army tips about Dutch strategy.

== Surrender of the Dutch ==
On 5 August, a cannonball fired by the Travancore army fell into a barrel of gunpowder inside the Dutch garrison, and the resulting fire destroyed the entire rice supply of the stockade. Consequently, the Dutch were forced to surrender on 7 August. While the Dutch records mention the date of the surrender as 7 August, some later sources give different dates for the Dutch surrender:

- 31 July 1741 (31 Āḍi 916 ME) according to P. Shungoonny Menon A History of Travancore, and T. K. Velu Pillai's Travancore State Manual Volume II.
- 31 July 1741 (15 Karkadakam 916 ME) according to V. Nagam Aiya's Travancore State Manual Volume I. Aiya's conversion of the ME date to CE is wrong: the correct corresponding date would be 15 July 1741.
- 10 August 1741 K. M. Panikkar's A History of Kerala.

The court chronicle (Rajyakaryam Churuna) of Marthanda Varma simply states the date as Āḍi 916 ME, without mentioning any specific day. Historian A. P. Ibrahim Kunju takes the Dutch date (7 August 1741 CE) to be correct.

The Dutch soldiers at Colachel surrendered on the condition that they would be allowed to go to Kanyakumari with their weapons. However, Marthanda Varma did not honor the agreement, and imprisoned them as soon as they came out of the fort. The Travancore forces captured a large number of muskets and some cannons from the Dutch garrison at Colachel. They imprisoned 24 Europeans, who were imprisoned at the Udayagiri Fort in Puliyoorkurichi. Later, Marthanda Varma gave them their weapons back, and asked them to join the Travancore army. Several European prisoners, including Eustachius De Lannoy and Duyvenschot accepted the offer and served Marthanda Varma. Twenty-eight high level Dutch officers, including Admiral De Lannoy, were captured. The defeat of the Dutch in Colachel was the turning point of the Travancore-Dutch War. De Lannoy went on to serve the Travancore kingdom for the next two decades and was promoted to the post of the Valiya Kappithan (Senior Admiral) of the Travancore forces. He modernized the Travancore army, and built the Nedumkottai, a line of fortifications in the north of the kingdom, which held up the army of Tipu Sultan in 1789, during his invasion of Travancore. De Lannoy is buried in the Udayagiri Fort, also known as Dillanai kottai (De Lannoy's fort).

== Impact ==
De Lannoy organized the Travancore army on European standard introduced gunpowder and firearms, hitherto not used in the kingdom, and increased the regiments and improved defense fortifications significantly.

Captain De Lannoy was a skilled military strategist. His military skills, combined with the tactics of the Dewan of Travancore, Ramayyan Dalawa, and statesmanship of Maharaja Marthanda Varma, proved very effective in the future military expeditions and annexations of the Northern kingdoms up to Cochin over a period of time. They defeated and annexed Quilon, Kayamkulam, Kottarakkara, Pandalam, Ambalapuzha, Edappalli, Thekkumkoor and Vadakkumkoor with Travancore.

The Dutch threat to Travancore was not eliminated after Marthanda Varma's success at Colachel, as is evident by the fact that the Dutch continued to wage war against Travancore in northern Malabar. They also maintained their position at Kanyakumari, hoping to receive reinforcements from Ceylon. However, a 5,000-strong army dispatched by Marthanda Varma prevented them from advancing towards the capital of Travancore. They also sent 150 soldiers to reinforce their advance posts at Paravur and Ayiroor. The Dutch gave up their position at Kanyakumari only in October. They also abandoned Attingal, after the soldiers of their ally Deshinganad abandoned them.

Travancore's victory at Colachel had greatly decreased Dutch morale, and in a 26 October report to Batavia, the Dutch command at Kochi mentioned that the native chiefs now believed that the Dutch East India Company could be driven off the Malabar coast. However, by February 1742, the Dutch had captured a small fort near Attingal.

In addition to the destruction of the Dutch East India Company's designs in the Malabar coast, the capture of the leaders of the expedition, Eustachius De Lannoy and his second in command Donadi, was very beneficial to the kingdom of Travancore. When De Lannoy and Donadi were paroled, they took up service with Travancore and modernized the Travancore Army (which, till then, had been armed mainly with melee weapons) into an effective fighting force. De Lannoy was initially entrusted with the training of a few companies of the Maharajah's bodyguards and he did this with such an excellence that he was entrusted with modernizing the entire Travancore army. De Lannoy modernized the existing firearms and introduced better artillery and, more importantly, trained the Travancore army in the European style of military drill and military tactics. He carried out his orders with such sincerity and devotion that he rapidly rose through the ranks, eventually becoming the "Valia Kapitaan" (Commander in Chief) of the Tranvancore military and was given the Udayagiri Fort, locally known as the "Dillanai kotta" (De Lannoy's fort), near Padmanabhapuram, to reside. He was one of the commanders of the Tranvancore army during the decisive battle of Ambalapuzha where the Dutch, his erstwhile employers, were fighting on behalf of Cochin and her allies. Following Travancore's victory over Cochin and her allies, the Dutch signed a peace treaty with Travancore and later sold their forts which were incorporated by De Lannoy into the Northern Lines (the Nedumkotta) that guarded the northern border of Travancore. The Travancore military that De Lannoy was instrumental in modernizing, went on to conquer more than half of the modern state of Kerala, and the Nedumkotta forts that De Lannoy had designed, held up the advance of Tipu Sultan's French trained army during the Third Anglo-Mysore War in 1791 AD till the British East India Company joined the war in support of Travancore. Donadi ended up as an officer in the Travancore army and it seems that the rest of the Dutch prisoners took up service with the Maharajah's forces and their descendants were present up to 1878 in Travancore.

Another direct outcome of the event at Kulachal was the takeover of the black pepper trade by the state of Travancore. This development was to have serious repercussions on the Dutch and the trading world of Kerala at large. In 1753 the Dutch signed the Treaty of Mavelikkara agreeing not to obstruct the Raja's expansion, and in turn, to sell to him arms and ammunition. This marked the beginning of the end of Dutch influence in India.

== Tributes ==
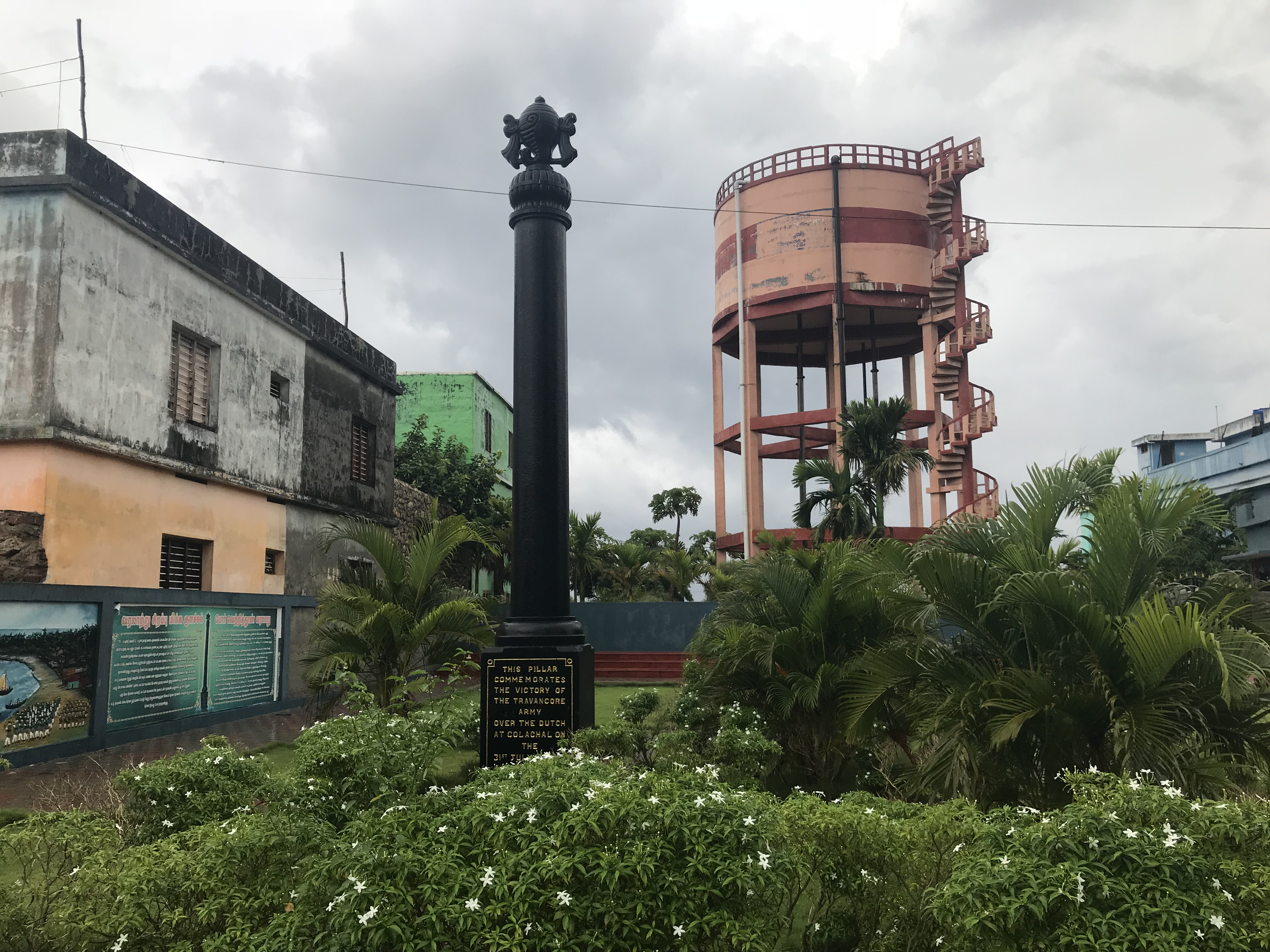
Victory pillar, in remembrance of victory against the Dutch Navy in 1741

- The Indian government has built a pillar of victory in Kulachal to commemorate the event.
- The Indian Post Department released a Rupee 5 stamp on 1 April 2004 to commemorate the tercentenary (300th anniversary) of the raising of the 9th Battalion of Madras Regiment.
- The Parade Ground of Pangode Military Camp is named as Kulachal Ground.

== See also ==
- Battle of Nedumkotta
- Siege of Chaliyam
