= Midalam =

Midalam Midalamthurai
- Village
- Location in Tamil Nadu, India
- Coordinates: 8.206°N 77.216°E
- Country: India
- State: Tamil Nadu
- District: Kanyakumari

Government
  - Assembly MLA: Rajesh Kumar S (INC)
  - Parliament MP: Vijay Vasanth

Area
  - Total: 4 km^{2} (1.5 sq mi)
- Elevation: 37 m (121 ft)

Population (2011)
  - Total: 8,625
  - Density: 2,010/km^{2} (5,200/sq mi)

Languages
  - Official: Tamil
  - Others: Malayalam
- Time zone: UTC+5:30 (IST)
- PIN: 629178
- Vehicle registration: TN 75
- Sex ratio: M 49.61% / F 50.39%
- Literacy: 89.20%
- Currency: INR
- Telephone Code: 04651
- Driving Side: Left

Midalam (sometimes known as Udayamarthandam) is a village in Killiyur block in Kaniyakumari District of Tamil Nadu, India. It is located 27 km towards west from District headquarters Nagercoil, 741 km from State capital Chennai, 55 km from Thiruvananthapuram, the capital of Kerala. It shares border with Enayam and Thengapattanam at the west, Kurumpanai and Colachel at the east, Karungal at the north and Arabian Sea to the south.

The Kovalam Colachel Canal popularly known as AVM Canal (Anantha Victoria Marthandam Canal) which passes through this village linking up to Kanyakumari was encroached by settlers. This waterway is in operation from Mandaikadu to Poovar for about 55 years. The beach near by it known as Midalam Beach.

== Geography ==
Midalam is located at 8.206°N 77.216°E. It has an area of 4 km^{2} and average elevation of 37 m (121 ft). Midalam Census Town has total administration over 2,204 houses to which it supplies basic amenities like water and sewerage. It is also authorize to build roads within Census Town limits and impose taxes on properties coming under its jurisdiction. It belongs to Killiyur legislative assembly, the 234th constituency of Tamil Nadu and under the Padmanabhapuram division. It belongs to Vilavancode Tehsil of Kanniyakumari district in Tamil Nadu, India. Vilavancode is the nearest town to Midalam village. Midalam is surrounded by Munchirai Block towards north, Thuckalay Block towards east, Kurunthancode Block towards east, Thiruvattar Block towards north. There is one UNESCO world heritage site nearby. It is the Western Ghats at a distance of 34 km north.

== Demography ==
Religious census
Religion	Percent(%)
Hindu	16.78%
Muslim	0.97%
Christian	82.13%
Sikh	0.01%
Buddhist	0.08%
Jain	0.00%
Other	0.00%
No religion	0.02%

The population of the village according to the 2011 census of India is 8,625 with male population of 4279 and female population of 4346. There are 2204 households in the census town and an average 4 persons live in every family. Sex ratio in general caste is 1017, in schedule caste is 971 and in schedule tribe is 667. There are 977 girls under 6 years of age per 1000 boys of the same age in the census town. Schedule Caste (SC) constitutes 1.60% while Schedule Tribe (ST) were 0.06% of total population in Midalam. Literacy rate of Midalam city is 89.20% higher than state average of 80.09%. In Midalam, Male literacy is around 90.59% while female literacy rate is 87.84%.Total 6838 people in the census town are literate, among them 3437 are male and 3401 are female. Literacy rate (children under 6 are excluded) of Midalam is 89%. 91% of male and 88% of female population are literate here. Christians contribute 82% of the total population and are the largest religious community in the census town followed by Hindus which contribute 17% of the total population.. Female Sex ratio per 1000 male in Christians are 1025 in Hindus are 977. Tamil and Malayalam are the local languages here.

== Worker's Profile ==
Midalam has 37% (3190) population engaged in either main or marginal works. 57% male and 17% female population are working population. 55% of total male population are main (full-time) workers and 2% are marginal (part-time) workers. For women 14% of total female population are main and 3% are marginal workers.

== Transport ==
=== Rail ===
The nearest railway station to Midalam is Eraniel which is located in and around 10.3 km distance.

=== Air ===
The nearest airport is Trivandrum International Airport situated at 45.4 km distance.

== Climate ==
Summers are humid with temperature that reach 34 °C. Monsoon months are from June till September with an average temperature of about 25 °C. Winters start from November and end in February with an average temperature of 22 °C.

Climate data for Kanyakumari
Month	Jan	Feb	Mar	Apr	May	Jun	Jul	Aug	Sep	Oct	Nov	Dec	Year
Mean daily maximum °C (°F)	28 (82)	28 (82)	30 (86)	32 (90)	32 (90)	29 (84)	28 (82)	28 (82)	28 (82)	28 (82)	27 (81)	27 (81)	29 (84)
Mean daily minimum °C (°F)	24 (75)	24 (75)	26 (79)	27 (81)	28 (82)	26 (79)	26 (79)	26 (79)	25 (77)	25 (77)	23 (73)	22 (72)	25 (77)
