= Eustachius De Lannoy =

Franco-Dutch military commander of the Kingdom of Travancore (1715-1775)

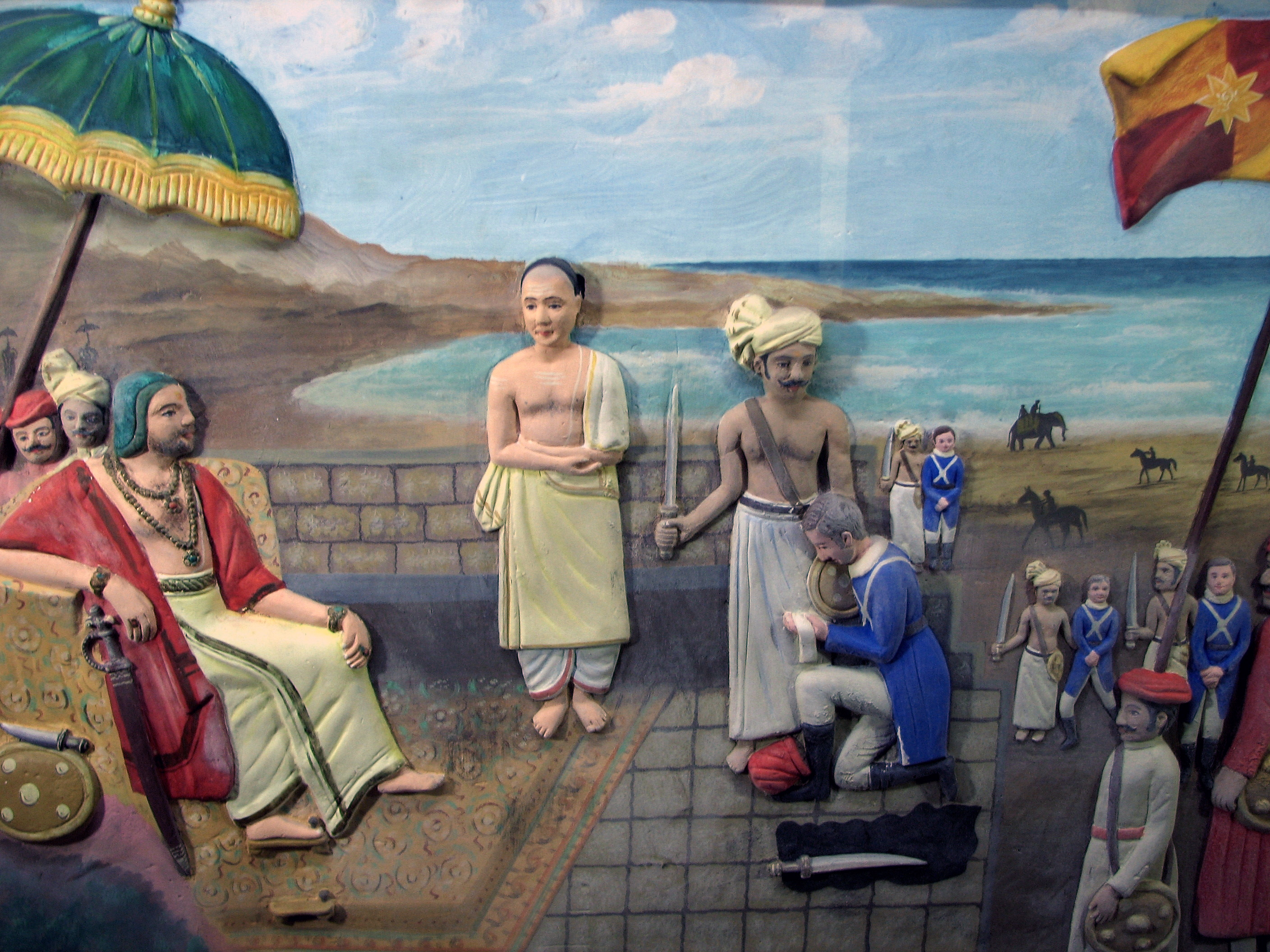
- Depiction of De Lannoy's surrender
- Born: 30 December 1715; Arras, Kingdom of France
- Died: 1 June 1777 (aged 61); Travancore
- Burial place: Udayagiri Fort, Tamil Nadu, India
- Military career
- Allegiance: Dutch East India Company (until 1741); Travancore (1741-1777)
- Rank: Commander

Eustachius Benedictus de Lannoy Dutch pronunciation: [ˌøy.ˈsta.xi.ʏs ˌbe.ne.ˈdɪk.tʏs də lɑ.ˈnoi] (also sometimes called 'Captain De Lannoy') (30 December 1715 – 1 June 1777, Udayagiri Fort) was a skilled military strategist and commander of the Travancore army, under Maharaja Marthanda Varma.

De Lannoy, originally a Dutch naval officer, arrived with a Dutch naval force at Colachel in 1741 sent by the Dutch East India Company, or Vereenigde Oost-Indische Compagnie (VOC) with the objective of instituting a trading post for the company at Colachel. The company was the world's first joint-stock company and was the largest multinational company. It was a very rich corporation and had its own naval fleet to protect its trade and maritime establishments.

In order to establish the trade post, the Dutch force had to engage the Travancore army. They subsequently defeated the Dutch naval force at the Battle of Colachel.

De Lannoy, who was captured in the battle, subsequently earned the trust of the king, Maharaja Marthanda Varma, who made him an officer in the Travancore military. De Lannoy trained the army on European lines and, in the course of time, became a valiant and successful commander of the same army that had defeated his Dutch forces. Captain de Lannoy, who joined his service, was promoted to the Senior Admiral (Valiya Kappithan), and modernised the Travancore army by introducing firearms and artillery.

His role as military commander of the Travancore army was instrumental in the later military successes and exploits of Travancore under Maharaja Marthanda Varma and Dharmaraja.

Though he served the Dutch, the origin of Captain de Lannoy was from France. He was part of the Delano family or de Lannoy family.

== Early life ==
De Lannoy was born on 30 December 1715, in Arras, France. He belonged to the de Lannoy family, an immigrant noble family from the Franco-Belgian border town of Lannoy. He was a Roman Catholic and early in his life he joined the Dutch East India Company. Over time, he became an expert in constructions for fortifications. He arrived in Colombo, Ceylon (present Sri Lanka) in 1737, where General Imhoff was stationed. General Imhoff had a liking towards De Lannoy and he took him to Travancore in 1739.

== Battle of Colachel ==
Logo of the Dutch East India Company

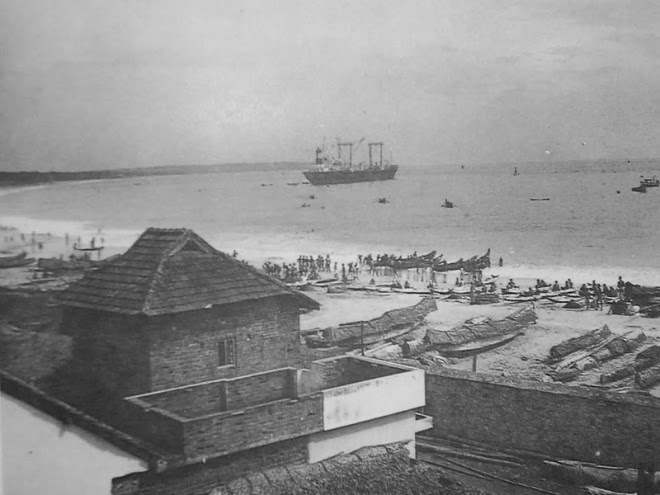
Colachel port in 1900s

Background

The Dutch East India Company wanted to acquire and monopolize the trade of pepper and other spices, which was sourced from the Kingdom of Kayamkulam and sold in the European markets at exorbitant prices . The negotiations with the Travancore the king Maharaja Marthanda Varma was futile, and it was decided to use military pressure against him.

In the 1730s, prior to the Battle of Colachel and the arrival of De Lannoy, Maharaja Marthanda Varma had annexed some territories to the north of his Kingdom and was also at confrontation with Kayamkulam. The Dutch governor at Cochin, M.A. Maten, took sides with the Maharaja's adversaries. This put the Dutch on a direct confrontation course with Marthanda Varma. Marthanda warma was bent on annexing Kayamkulam which would become futile for the Dutch company.

During a visit to Cochin in 1739, the Dutch governor of Ceylon, Gustaaf Willem van Imhoff, made a report to his government on the interferences of the Maharaja in the affairs of the smaller Malabar kingdoms. The subsequent year, the Governor gave a direct warning to the Maharaja, threatening an invasion of Travancore territories.

In 1741, the Dutch also restored to the throne, the young princess of Elayadathu Swarupam who had been deposed by the Maharaja. When this came to the knowledge of the Maharaja, he attacked the Elayadathu Princess and the Dutch. The Dutch were defeated and the Princess fled to Cochin. Maharaja Marthanda Varma also attacked and captured the Dutch forts in Travancore.

The Dutch now planned for an attack on Travancore. They called for reinforcements from the Dutch settlements in Ceylon. Thus, Eustachius De Lannoy and his Dutch naval expedition went on a mission to defeat the Maharaja and take over his territories. His forces landed near Colachel, at Thengapattanam, Midalam and Kadiapattinam. At this time, Marthanda Varma and the main part of his army were away in the northern territories.

The battle

The Dutch forces initially took over the lands from Colachel to Kottar (in present-day Nagercoil). Their next aim was to proceed to capture Padmanabhapuram, the capital. But soon the Travancore forces arrived from the North under the direct command of Marthanda Varma and his minister, Ramayyan Dalawa. and commanders of the Travancore army,

The two forces met at Colachel on 10 August 1741 (O.S. 31 July 1741). De Lannoy's military contingent was superior in that, it had firearms and artillery and was better equipped and trained, but was no match to the tactics and aggressiveness used by the Travancore forces at the Battle of Colachel. Legends states that a tiny spark to the gun powder stock in their ship buried all their rice reserves. The foodless army had no other go than surrendering to the Travancore contingent. Further, the Dutch were helpless against the cavalry of Travancore. The local legends state that, in accordance with the orders of the Maharajah, the local fisherfolk had made cannon replicas, diverting the attention of the Dutch. This battle is important as it marked the decline of Dutch influence in India.

In all, twenty-four Dutch officers were imprisoned, including De Lannoy and Donadi, while the rest of the Dutchmen either retreated to their ships or were killed.

== Appointment as Travancore army commander ==
The Dutch prisoners expressed their willingness to serve the Maharaja of Travancore. De Lannoy was entrusted with the job of training a Regiment of the army in European tactics of war and discipline. De Lannoy performed this task to the satisfaction of Marthanda Varma who appointed him captain. Donadi also was given a high military post.

De-Lannoy gave attention to the reorganization of the army of Travancore which consisted of 50,000 troops of all branches such as infantry, cavalry, artillery and irregular troops, trained and drilled on Western lines under his direction and supervision

De Lannoy organized the Travancore army on European lines, introduced gunpowder and firearms, hitherto not used in the kingdom, and increased the regiments and improved defence fortifications.

Captain De Lannoy was a skilled military strategist. His military skills, combined with the tactics of the Dewan of Travancore, Ramayyan Dalawa, and statesmanship of Maharaja Marthanda Varma proved very effective in the future military exploitations and annexations of the Northern kingdoms up to Cochin over a period of time. They defeated and annexed Quilon, Kayamkulam, Kottarakkara, Pandalam, Ambalapuzha, Edappally, Thekkumkoor and Vadakkumkoor with Travancore.

Captain De Lannoy's military skills and loyalty were recognised not only by the king and his state officials, but also by the subjects of Travancore, who called him by the nom de guerre "Valiya Kappithaan ", meaning 'The Great Captain'.

== Forts built under De Lennoy's supervision ==
=== Nedumkotta ===
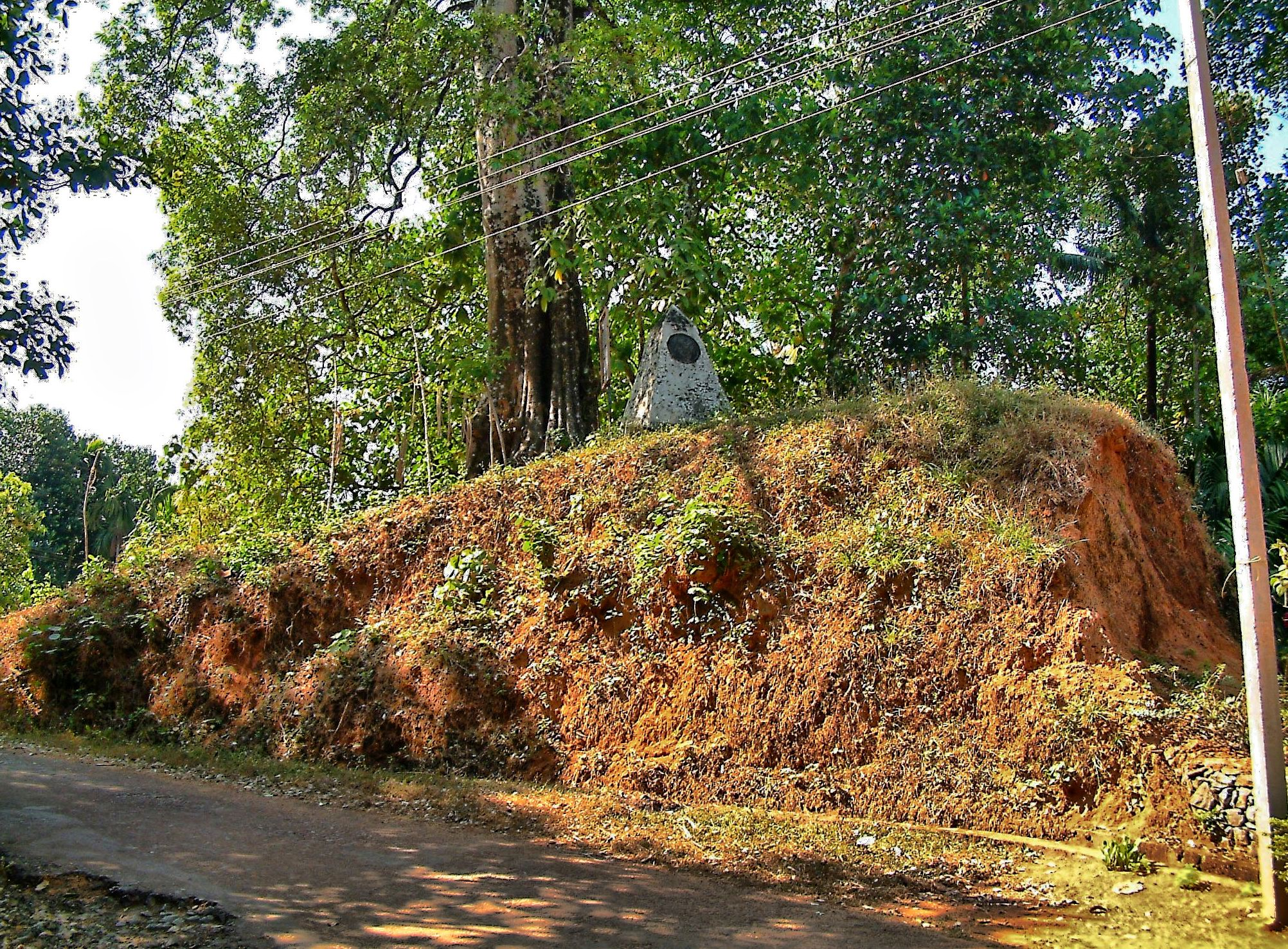
Relics of Nedumkotta in Thrissur District

De Lannoy built the Nedumkotta, a line of fortifications in the North of the Kingdom, known as the Travancore Lines. This fortification proved immensely useful in defending the kingdom against the attacks of Tipu Sultan and other marauders.

The wall was well-fortified and garrisoned. It had mounds, underground tunnels, barracks, arsenals and supply depots. It was a great stoppage to any invader coming from the north. It was erased by Tipu Sultan in an act of revenge for having been defeated in his attempt to subdue Travancore in 1789. It had a length of 40 km and extended from the sea near Vypeen Island to the Western ghats. Just before returning to Mysore after his failed attempt, he spent six days to demolish the lines which he called the 'Contemptible Wall'. He had sworn to demolish it earlier after his failed attempt to breach it on 28 December 1789, and lost 2000 soldiers in that single night, due to the spirited defence by the Cadres, for the loss of just a few soldiers of Travancore.

Many other forts like the Vattakottai Fort facing the sea near Kanyakumari, the hill-forts of Savakkotta, and the Marunnu Kotta (Ammunition fort) near Padmanabhapuram were built under De Lannoy's supervision.

De Lannoy is also credited with the construction of some other small forts and tunnels in the region.

=== Padmanabhapuram fort ===
The palace fort of Padmanabhapuram was constructed to protect the palace and for the safety of the king who lived in the Padmanabhapuram palace. The fort has an area of 187 acres. The Padmanabhapuram fort was originally built with mud, then disassembled and reconstructed with granite rocks. The height of the walls varies from 15 feet to 24 feet according to the inclination of the ground. The thickness of the fort wall was 35 feet.

=== Udayagiri fort ===
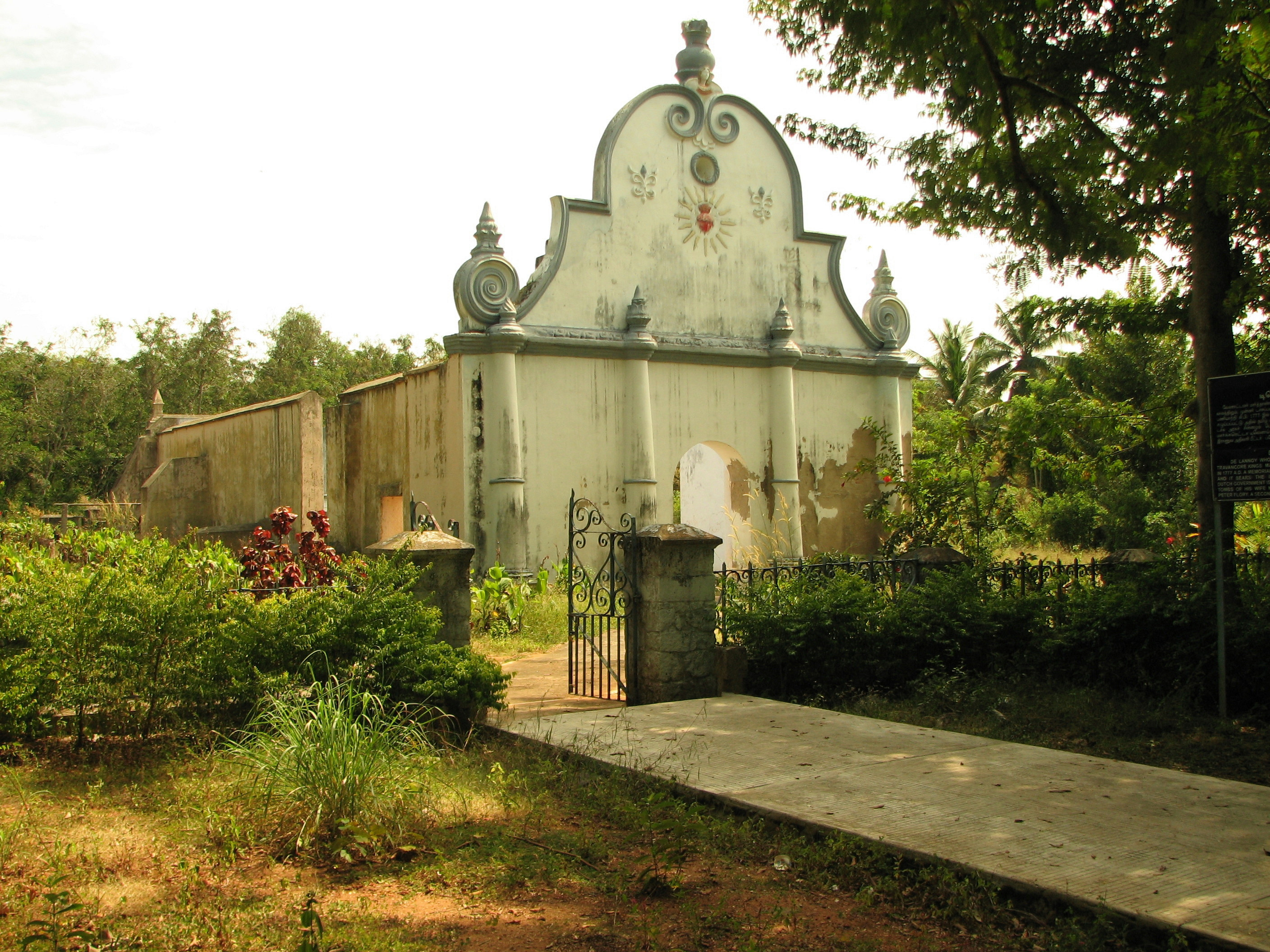
De Lannoy's Tomb at Udayagiri Fort on the Kanyakumari-Trivandrum highway.

The Udayagiri Fort is situated nearly one kilometer away from Thuckalay. De-Lannoy reconstructed and fortified the fort at Udayagiri, which was built in 1742 A.D. The Udayagiri Fort walls and ramparts which are 18 feet high and 15 feet thickness with parapets averaging 4 feet in height are faced with huge blocks of well arranged granite. The space between the inner and the outer ramparts consisted of mud. Besides the gateway there are smaller doors near three bastions. The Udayagiri Fort served as a military base during the reign of Marthanda Varma which was supervised by Captain De-Lannoy

=== Cannon Factory ===
He built a factory to produce war materials such as cannon balls. These were heavy artillery materials made of pure iron. The weight of such cannon balls ranged from 30 kgs to 1800 kgs.

=== Vattakkottai ===
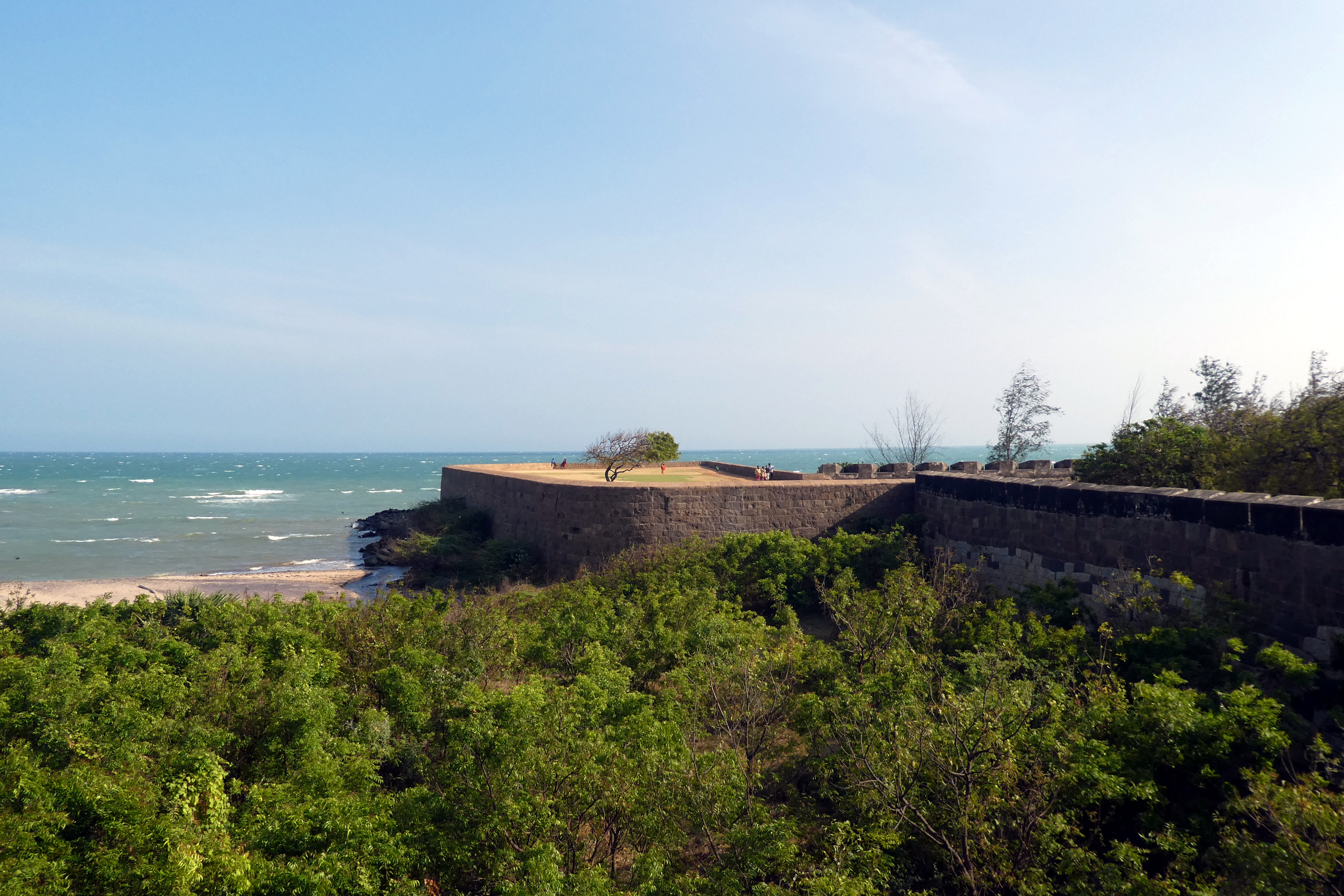
Vattakkottai and the sea

De Lannoy repaired and strengthened the old fort that was built by Pandya kings. Vattakottai Fort is a specially built fort on the sea coastline on the southern tip of India. It was set up as the southern most sea coast defense area by the Dutch. Its a Rectangular shaped fort made of granite stones. As the corners are curved it presents itself as a circular shape and hence the name vattakkottai (Circular fort) The fortification of Vattakottai was completed under the supervision of De-Lannoy assisted by Marthanda Pillai, a local chief. The fort covers an area of three and a half acres. The fort is enclosed by walls 25 to 26 feet high, including the parapet, 29 feet thick at the front, 18 feet at the corners and 6 feet at the rear. Inside the fort, there are watch towers which measures from 3 to 6 feet. THere are holes on the walls for the guns and ramps inside the ramparts for the cannons to be moved. This fort was built of stone and lime and it covered an area of 171800 square feet. The fort was strategically situated to carry out defensive maneuvers.

=== Ammunition Fort ===
This fort which is located one kilometer away from Padmanabhapuram was also built by Captain De Lannoy. It was earlier built to protect the Padmanabhapuram palace and was fortified by the Dutch captain. This fort was used to manufacture and store ammunition for the artilleries and fire arms produced at Udayagiri Fort.

== Life at Udayagiri ==
As a Christian, De Lannoy was prohibited from entering the king's palace at Padmanabhapuram, so he resided primarily at Udayagiri Fort, or De Lannoy Kotta (de Lannoy's Fort) as it is known locally, where he had also built a small chapel for his family and other Christians.

== Conversion of Saint Devasahayam Pillai ==
At some point of his military career, De Lannoy got well acquainted with Neelakanta Pillai, a Nair palace official, who after learning of Christian traditions and beliefs through De Lannoy, converted to Christianity. As they both had influential roles under the king, they got well acquainted. Neelankanta Pillai took the baptised name of Devasahayam Pillai. Devasahayam became a martyr of the Christian faith in 1752.

The Roman Catholic church under Pope Benedict XVI made Devasahayam Pillai a beatified laity of the church in 2012, and was made a saint on 15 May 2022 by Pope Francis Thus, De Lannoy had an important role in the conversion and Christian life of saint Devasahayam Pillai.

== Death ==
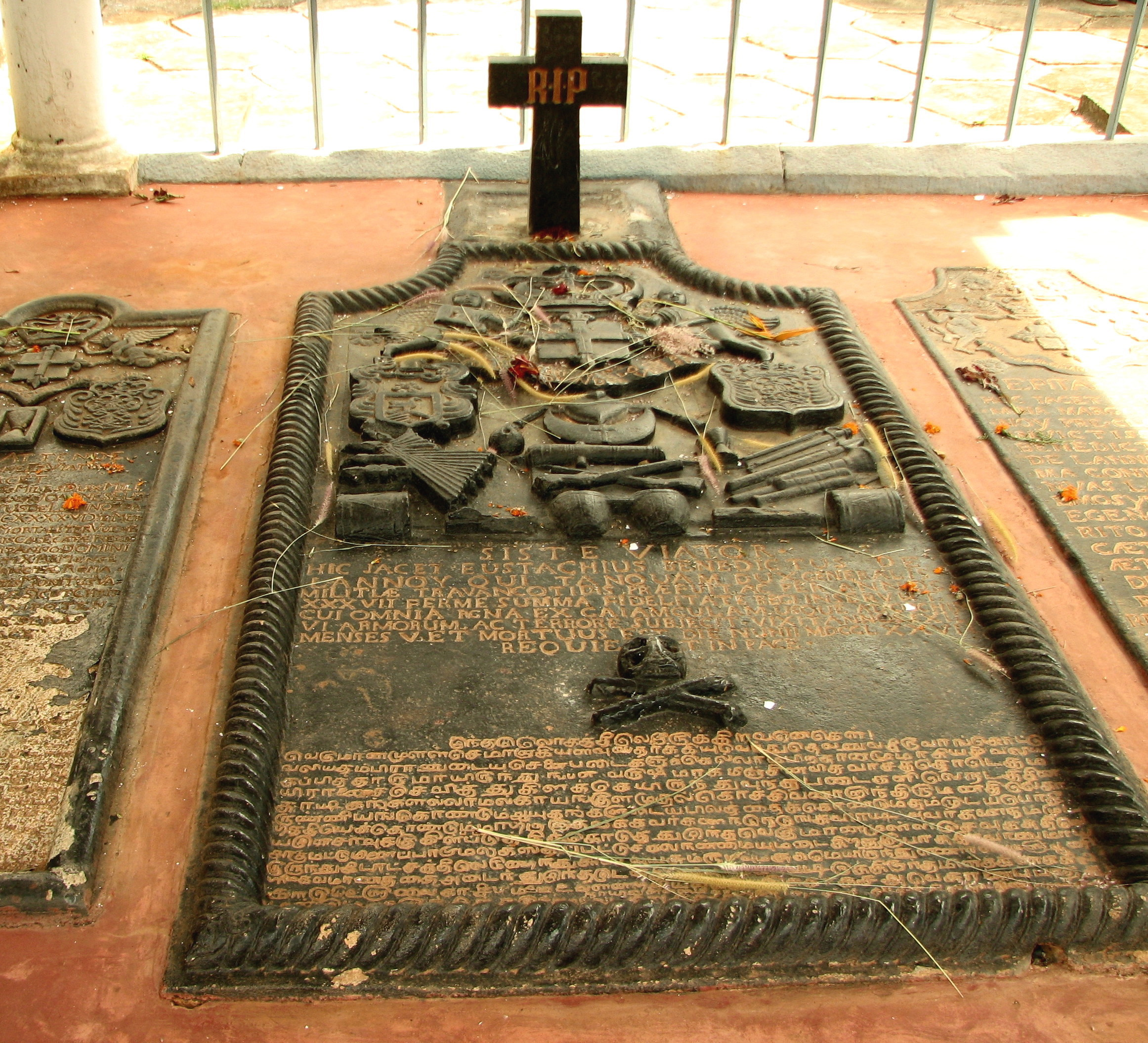
De Lannoy's burial site at the tomb at Udayagiri Fort, with inscriptions in Latin and Tamil.

Maharaja Marthanda Varma died in 1758, and De Lannoy served as military chief to his successor Dharma Raja. De Lannoy died in 1777 and was interred in the chapel within Udayagiri Fort. The tombs of De Lannoy and his family can be seen inside the church.

The English translation of the Latin inscription on his tombstone runs:

"Stand Traveller! Here lies Eustachius Benedictus De Lannoy: who was Commander of the general Travancore Army and for nearly thirty-seven years with the greatest faithfulness served the King, to whom by the strength and fear of his armies he subjugated all kingdoms from Kayangulam [Kayamkulam] to Cochin. He lived 62 years and 5 months and died first day of June 1777. May he rest in peace."

== See also ==
- Udayagiri Fort, location of De Lannoy's tomb on the present-day Nagercoil–Trivandrum highway, near Thuckalay.
- Padmanabhapuram, the capital of Travancore during the time of Marthanda Varma.
- Colachel, where De Lannoy first landed as Commander of the Dutch fleet, is a small seaport in present-day Kanyakumari District.
- Vattakottai Fort ("Circular Fort") is a seaside fort, close to Kanyakumari.
