= Midalakadu =

City in Tamil Nadu

Midalakkadu is a Developing City in the Kanniyakumari district in the Indian state of Tamil Nadu. It is approximately 56 kilometres (35 mi) from Thiruvananthapuram. It is a junction of four roads.

== Geography ==
Coastal villages are Midalam in the west side, Kurumpanai in the south side, Karungal in the north side and Palapallam in the east side.

Midalakkadu is located in the center of Karungal and Kurumpanai.

== Good Shepherd Church ==
The Roman Catholic church in Midalakadu is the Good Shepherd Church, established in 2003 and located in Kanyakumari district. It functions under the Roman-Latin rite as part of the Diocese of Kottar.

Church Overview: Name: Good Shepherd Church. Location: Midalakadu, Palappallam, Kanyakumari District, Tamil Nadu (PIN: 629159). Diocese: Roman Catholic Diocese of Kottar. Established: 2003. Principal Patron: Good Shepherd. Feast Day: Celebrated on the 4th Sunday after Easter.

== Climate ==
Summers are humid with temperature that reach 34 °C. Monsoon months are from June till September with an average temperature of about 25 °C. Winters start from November and end in February with an average temperature of 22 °C.
