= Christ Lutheran Church =

Christ Lutheran Church may refer to:

== India ==
- Christ Lutheran Church, Narsapur, Andhra Pradesh
- Christ Lutheran Church Kattukadai, Tamil Nadu

== United States ==
- Christ Evangelical Lutheran Church, in Milwaukee, Wisconsin
- Christ Lutheran Church (Ellenville, New York)
- Christ Lutheran Church (New York City)

== See also ==
- Cross of Christ Lutheran Church, Welch Township, Minnesota
