= Alathankarai Kabaddi Club =

Kabaddi club in Tamil Nadu, India

Alathankarai Kabaddi Club is a kabaddi club in Alathankarai, a small village hamlet in Rajakkamangalam, Kanyakumari District of Tamil Nadu, India. The club was founded by Ravichandran, a former kabaddi player, in 1989 and provides free training for young people in Alathankarai and the neighbouring village. Apart from Kabadi the club also teaches Silambattam, an ancient form of martial arts in India.

Alathankarai Kabaddi Club has produced numerous kabaddi players who have gone on to represent the country.

== History ==
The club was formed to train players who could represent India and improve the low economic status of the village.

== About the Club ==
The current number of players in the club is 110 in the junior senior and super-senior category.

Players of the club who are currently part of pro-kabadi league are Jeeva Kumar (who was part of the team which won gold medal at the 2010 Asian Games in Guangzhou), R Sriram (Dabang Delhi), Jeeva Kumar (UP Yoddha), Chandran Ranjit (Gujarat Fortunegiants), M Babu (Haryana Steelers) and D Suresh Kumar (U Mumba) Abishek (Tamil Thalaivas).
