= Christ Lutheran Church Kattukadai =

Church in Tamil Nadu, India

Coordinates: 8.218819°N 77.241094°E

Christ Lutheran Church Kattukadai is a church in Kattukadai, functioning under the Indian Evangelical Lutheran Church (IELC). It is one of the oldest and most famous churches in the town. Historically, it received financial support from foreign missionaries and local landlords. Nearest Landmarks are Midalakadu within 1 km Distance, from Karungal 2 km.

== Sunday Services ==
Every Sunday mass services starts from 8am to 10am. Usually services will be conducted in Tamil. Followed by the service Sunday class sessions will be conducted by promoter & Teachers (except first Sunday). Every month first Sunday will be the Communion (sacrament) Sunday.

== Youth Prayer Club ==
This prayer club is Organized by Christ Lutheran Church Kattukadai youth members there will be the Head, Treasurer and Organizers, every second Sunday meeting to be held in church campus.they are doing some of the activities in within the church and outside of the church such as Help the helpless, keep the church clean and tidy, conducting outdoor prayer meetings etc.
