= L2: Empuraan (soundtrack) =

2025 soundtrack album by Deepak Dev

- Soundtrack album cover

Soundtrack album by Deepak Dev
- Released: 24 April 2025
- Recorded: 2023–2025
- Studio: Dev's Wonderland, Kochi; The Audio Guys, Mumbai
- Genre: Feature film soundtrack
- Length: 27:25
- Language: Malayalam; Hindi
- Label: Aashirvad Records
- Producer: Deepak Dev

Deepak Dev chronology
Idiyan Chandhu (2024)	L2: Empuraan (2025)

Singles from L2: Empuraan
- 1. "Phir Zinda" Released: 25 March 2025; 2. "Kaavalaai Chekavar" Released: 29 March 2025; 3. "Azrael" Released: 3 April 2025; 4. "Empuraane" Released: 12 April 2025

External audio
- Audio Jukebox on YouTube

L2: Empuraan is the soundtrack album composed by Deepak Dev for the 2025 Indian Malayalam-language political gangster action thriller film of the same name directed by Prithviraj Sukumaran, starring Mohanlal. The album comprises seven tracks written by Tanishk Nabar, Murali Gopy, Vinayak Sasikumar and Prithviraj himself, with six of them being released as singles. The soundtrack was digitally released by Aashirvad Cinemas on 24 April 2025.

== Production ==
L2: Empuraan is Deepak Dev's eleventh collaboration with Mohanlal, and third with Prithviraj as a director, after Lucifer (2019) and Bro Daddy (2022). Dev mentioned that Prithviraj envisioned a Hollywood-style musical experience, opting for live orchestral recordings and other sophisticated elements, instead of relying on conventional beats produced by high-end keyboards. In March 2023, Dev stated that he had commenced work on the music.

During an interview with Red FM Malayalam, he revealed that the soundtrack would not include an item song, unlike Lucifer. He further stated that Mohanlal would feature in a few songs that align with the film's tone. He noted that the songs in Empuraan would differ in style from those in its predecessor. "There will be a distinct style for Empuraan, and it will be heavier than before. Prithviraj and Antony have encouraged a more innovative approach", said Dev, during a conversation with 94.3 Club FM in September 2024. The first song had already been completed by that time. The tracks "Azrael" and "Sancharame," sung by Usha Uthup and Jakes Bejoy respectively, were recorded in March 2025.

The song "Empuraane", featuring vocals by Prithviraj's daughter Alankrita Menon Prithviraj, was initially intended to be rendered by an adult female singer. However, the emotional intensity of the scene prompted a creative change. Upon recognising that the scene called for a child's cry, the team felt that Alankrita's vocals would lend the desired emotional depth. Once introduced to the song, she was able to perform it within five minutes. Also, Prithviraj's niece, Prarthana Indrajith, contributed her vocals to the film's teaser theme, featuring lyrics penned by Prithviraj himself, marking his debut as a lyricist.

== Release ==
Of the seven tracks featured on the album, six were released individually as singles. "L2: Empuraan Teaser Theme", the first single, was released on 27 January 2025. It was followed by "L2: Empuraan Trailer Theme" on 24 March 2025. The third single was a Hindi song, "Phir Zinda", which was released on 25 March 2025, two days prior to the film's theatrical premiere. The fourth single, "Kaavalaai Chekavar", followed on 29 March 2025. The fifth single, "Azrael", was released on 3 April 2025. "Empuraane" was the final single, released on 12 April 2025. The only non-single track "Sancharame" was released along with the soundtrack on 24 April 2025.

== Track listing ==
=== Malayalam ===
No.	Title	Lyrics	Singer(s)	Length
1.	"Phir Zinda"	Tanishk Nabar	Anand Sreeraj	5:34
2.	"Kaavalaai Chekavar"	Murali Gopy	Job Kurian	4:04
3.	"Azrael"	Murali Gopy	Usha Uthup	4:52
4.	"Empuraane"	Vinayak Sasikumar	Anand Sreeraj, Alankrita Menon Prithviraj	2:45
5.	"Sancharame"	Vinayak Sasikumar	Jakes Bejoy	3:59
6.	"L2: Empuraan Teaser Theme"	Prithviraj Sukumaran	Prarthana Indrajith	2:19
7.	"L2: Empuraan Trailer Theme"	Instrumental	Anand Sreeraj, Alankrita M. Sukumaran	3:52
Total length:				27:25

=== Tamil ===
All tracks are written by Mohan Rajan.

No.	Title	Singer(s)	Length
1.	"Kaappavar"	Palakkad Sreeram	4:05
2.	"Azrael"	Usha Uthup	4:52
3.	"Empuraane"	Anand Sreeraj, Alankrita Menon Prithviraj	2:45
4.	"Oh Payaname"	Jakes Bejoy	4:01
Total length:			15:44

=== Telugu ===
All tracks are written by Krishna Kanth.

No.	Title	Singer(s)	Length
1.	"Rakshakudedi"	Yazin Nizar	4:05
2.	"Azrael"	Usha Uthup	4:52
3.	"Empuraane"	Anand Sreeraj, Alankrita Menon Prithviraj	2:45
4.	"Sancharame"	Jakes Bejoy	4:01
Total length:			15:45

=== Kannada ===
All tracks are written by Hridaya Shiva.

No.	Title	Singer(s)	Length
1.	"Kaavalugaaranu"	Yazin Nizar	4:04
2.	"Azrael"	Usha Uthup	4:52
3.	"Empuraane"	Anand Sreeraj, Alankrita Menon Prithviraj	2:45
4.	"Sanjarave"	Jakes Bejoy	4:02
Total length:			15:45

=== Hindi ===
All tracks are written by Tanishk Nabar.

No.	Title	Singer(s)	Length
1.	"Maseeha"	Siddharth Mahadevan	4:04
2.	"Azrael"	Usha Uthup	4:52
3.	"Empuraane"	Anand Bhaskar, Alankrita Menon Prithviraj	2:45
4.	"Kya Yeh Safar"	Deepak Dev	4:00
Total length:			15:43

== Non-album singles ==
The song "The Devil's Arrival," performed by Anand Sreeraj, was released on 7 April 2025. The following day, "The Jungle Pwoli – Kadavule Pole Reprise," featuring vocals by Jakes Bejoy and Sreeraj, was also released. It was the only song from the film distributed under the Goodwill Entertainments label.

No.	Title	Lyrics	Singer(s)	Length
1.	"The Devil's Arrival"	Instrumental	Anand Sreeraj	1:36
2.	"The Jungle Pwoli – Kadavule Pole Reprise"	Jeff J. Panikulam, Rhyko, Logan	Jakes Bejoy, Anand Sreeraj	3:37
Total length:				5:13

== Reception ==
=== Critical response ===
For Pinkvilla, Goutham S stated, "The true soul of the movie became music composer Deepak Dev, who managed to create awe and excitement in every frame of the movie. His skills and reputation truly leave a lot more to be explored."

"Deepak Dev's music and background score enhance every scene, creating a pulsating atmosphere", said critic Pratyusha Sista, writing for Telangana Today. Anna Mathews of The Times of India felt "Deepak Dev's music perfectly matches the brilliantly visualised scenes; we get involved in Khureshi's quests and get a feel for the mood, thanks to this." Arjun Menon of Rediff too praised the soundtrack stating, "Deepak Dev's rousing, orchestral score is the perfect match for the stately, epic filmmaking that treats each narrative with similar attention." Sanjith Sidhardhan, a chief film critic at OTTplay, stated, "Just like Lucifer, Deepak Dev's songs 'Kadavule Pole' and 'Empuraane' play with a more frenetic tempo and succeed in sending the fans into a frenzy." Rohit Panikker, reviewing for Times Now, felt "The soundtrack by Deepak Dev has its ebbs and flow, where it offers some peak moments, sometimes feeling quite intrusive and wrongly-placed."

Bollywood Hungama wrote "Deepak Dev's music has no scope. 'Phir Zinda', however, is well-utilized. Deepak Dev's background score is powerful and elevates impact in several scenes." In his musical analysis, Anandu Suresh of The Indian Express concludes: "Stunt Silva's action choreography is underwhelming as well, though not as much as Deepak Dev's uninspired background score, which is one of the film's most glaring weaknesses. The absence of a truly electrifying score has significantly diminished Empuraan's dramatic and massy impact."

=== Audience response ===
The music as well as the background score, without considering the movie itself, were negatively received by the audience.
