= Alathankarai =

Hamlet in Tamil Nadu, India

Alathankarai is a small village hamlet located in Rajakkamangalam block in Kanyakumari District of Tamil Nadu, India. It comes under Rajakkamangalam Panchayath. It is 9 km from Nagercoil District Headquarters,4 km from Rajakkamangalam and 740 km from Chennai. Padmanabhapuram, Nagercoil, Karungal, Unnamalaikadai are the nearby Cities to Alathankarai.

== Demographic ==
Tamil is the local language in this village.

== Nearest Railway Station ==
The nearest railway station is Virani Alur Rail Way Station and Nagercoil Town Rail Way Station

== Bus Stops ==
The nearest bus stops are Ganapathipuram Junction Bus Stop, Soorapallam Bus Stop, Dharmapuram Bus Stop and Eathamozhy School Bus Stop.
