= Kurumpanai =

Neighbourhood in Kanyakumari district, Tamil Nadu, India

Kurumpanai is a small village on the west coastline of Kanyakumari district of the Indian state of Tamil Nadu. It has a two-kilometre-long (1.2 mi) natural beach along its western shoreline. More than a 5000 people live there. Tamil and Malayalam are most spoken languages.

== Economy ==
The people continue to be predominantly employed in the traditional profession of fishing. Graduates look for jobs and business opportunities in the cities and overseas rather than enter the fishing industry. Schools remain a primary source of employment for educated girls.

== Education ==
Kurumpanai includes St. Ignatius Higher Secondary School, St. Ignatius primary School, and St. Ignatius KG School.The schools are named after its patron, St. Ignatius. Almost every household has at least one graduate or post-graduate.

== Transportation ==
Public buses connect to the nearby towns of Nagercoil, Marthandam, Colachel and Karungal. Auto-rickshaws and privately owned cars are available for hire. The nearest airport is Thiruvananthapuram International Airport in the state of Kerala.

== Culture ==
Kurumpanai is a Catholic village. Its Catholic church has the patronage of St. Ignatius of Loyola, administered by the Catholic Diocese of Kottar. The Congregation of Franciscan Missionaries of Mary established a Catholic convent here. St. Ignatius Church was built in the 19th .Christmas is celebrated well in these place by families and friends with memorable moments

== Geography ==
Kurumpanai Beach is a 2 km long natural beach and is one of the most beautiful beaches in the district. It starts from the Siluvaiya church on the west side to Paraikal on the east side. It is also known as Paraikal Beach.

== Sports ==
There are many sports and players in Kurumpanai, e.g. kabaddi, basketball, football, cricket, volleyball, badminton, handball. Among basketball players, seniors participated in national level matches, and are currently the champions of Kanyakumari District. They make up the club of Ignatius Sports Academy and guide the juniors to reach a good standard.
