= Lucifer (soundtrack) =

2019 soundtrack album by Deepak Dev

- Soundtrack album cover

Soundtrack album by Deepak Dev
- Released: 30 April 2019
- Recorded: 2018–2019
- Venue: Kochi, Chennai, San Francisco
- Studio: Dev's Wonderland, Kochi; Sound Tech, Chennai; El Studios, San Francisco
- Genre: Feature film soundtrack
- Length: 21:10
- Language: Malayalam; Tamil; Hindi; English
- Label: Goodwill Entertainments
- Producer: Deepak Dev

Deepak Dev chronology
Masterpiece (2018)	Lucifer (2019)	Ittymaani: Made in China (2019)
External audio
- Lucifer – Official Audio Jukebox on YouTube

Lucifer is the soundtrack album to the 2019 Indian Malayalam-language political action thriller film of the same name directed by Prithviraj Sukumaran, produced by Antony Perumbavoor under Aashirvad Cinemas, starring Mohanlal. The soundtrack featured five songs composed by Deepak Dev and lyrics written by Tanishk Nabar, Logan, Amsi Narayanapilla, Murali Gopy and Usha Uthup. The songs were performed by Jyotsna Radhakrishnan, Karthik, Baradwaj, Gopy and Uthup.

== Development ==
Lucifer is Dev's sixth collaboration with Mohanlal, and first with Prithviraj as a director. The film's soundtrack consists of five tracks from Malayalam, Hindi and English languages. Usha Uthup was announced to perform the titular song deciphered as the "L Anthem" which was confirmed by the scriptwriter Murali Gopy who shared a Facebook post featuring him Prithviraj, Dev with Uthup and her family. Gopy described that the team "have always been great admirers of the way she delivers a song, in a way only she can. So, it was a great thing for Raju, Deepak and me, when Usha Didi agreed to sing a song for Lucifer". Uthup performed the Malayalam version of the same track under the title "Empuraane" penned by Gopy.

Jyotsna Radhakrishnan performed the item number "Raftaara" featuring Waluscha De Sousa that appears in the pre-climax scene. The producers wanted playback singers from the Hindi film industry to perform the track. Dev approached Jyotsna to perform a rough version, and when she performed it, Prithviraj and Gopy liked the track and finalized on her vocals. She described numerous challenges on performing the song in Hindi as "it is a great responsibility to show justice to the language by emulating the right pronunciation". Tanishk Nabar wrote the song after multiple revisions who was satisfied with Jyotsna's rendition.

Dev re-arranged and programmed the patriotic song "Varika Varika Sahajare", originally composed by G. Devarajan and written by Amsi Narayanapilla during the Salt March in 1930s. This version was sung by Gopy. The film's original score and songs were recorded at Dev's Wonderland studio in Kochi and Sound Tech in Chennai, with Arjun Muralidharan being the recording engineer and the album was mixed by Shadab Rayeen at New Edge Studios in Mumbai, and mastered by Gethin John and Donal Whelan at Haford Mastering in London.

== Release ==
The first song from the film, the patriotic song "Varika Varika Sahajare" was released as a lyric video on 23 March 2019. The lyrical video for the second song "Kadavule Pole" was released on 30 March. The third song "Raftaara" sung by Jyotsna and written by Tanishk Nabar was released on 7 April. The fourth song "Empuraane" was released as a lyric video on 13 April. The fifth track "L Anthem" was released along with the soundtrack on 30 April.

== Track listing ==
No.	Title	Lyrics	Singer(s)	Length
1.	"Raftaara"	Tanishk Nabar	Jyotsna Radhakrishnan	6:16
2.	"Kadavule Pole"	Logan	Karthik, Bharadwaj	3:24
3.	"Varika Varika"	Amsi Narayanapilla	Murali Gopy	4:30
4.	"Empuraane"	Murali Gopy	Usha Uthup	3:29
5.	"Empuraane (English Version)"	Usha Uthup	Usha Uthup	3:00
Total length:				21:10

== Background Score ==
There are total of 20 songs in the background score album of the movie, which was released on 26 January 2021, coinciding with Republic Day of India. The album's label is under Goodwill Entertainments

Lucifer

Film score by Deepak Dev
- Released: 26 January 2021
- Recorded: 2018 – 2019
- Venue: Kochi, Chennai
- Studio: Dev's Wonderland, Kochi; Sound Tech, Chennai
- Genre: Film score
- Length: 26:22
- Label: Goodwill Entertainments
- Producer: Deepak Dev
External audio
- Lucifer – Original Background Score on YouTube

No.	Title	Length
1.	"Interpol Theme"	0:26
2.	"Lucifer Title Theme"	0:59
3.	"Priyadarshini Ramdas Theme"	1:09
4.	"Bobby x Fyodor Theme"	4:30
5.	"Stephen Nedumpally Theme (Title Credits)"	3:21
6.	"Stephen At Funeral"	3:09
7.	"Bobby's Decision"	3:23
8.	"Bobby's Deal"	1:05
9.	"Stephen Challenges Bobby"	2:23
10.	"Evidence Against Bobby"	1:00
11.	"Abducting Govardhan"	0:30
12.	"Factory Visit"	2:26
13.	"The Painful Past"	2:36
14.	"Stephen's Arrest"	2:19
15.	"One Call (Interval Theme)"	0:55
16.	"Jathin Ramdas Theme"	1:56
17.	"Theni Blast (Zayed Masood Theme)"	5:04
18.	"Stephen Released (Brotherhood)"	2:19
19.	"Raftaara Transition (The Final Showdown)"	3:45
20.	"Khureshi-Abr'aam Theme"	1:56

== Reception ==
Critics highlighted the background score being overused and felt repetitive, although the songs were categorised as decent. S. Sethuraman of Film Companion South felt that the music being "jarring" and described it as a "letdown". Sowmya Rajendran of The News Minute felt it as "loud" and "intruding". Sanjith Sidhardhan of The Times of India wrote "Deepak Dev's music could very well be another character in the film, entering the fray and heightening the thrill element at places. However, overuse of the background score becomes jarring at times too and takes away from the viewing experience." Gautham S. of Deccan Chronicle however said that the music complimented the "mass feel of the film".

While the song "Raftaara" was praised by listeners, critics felt that the song being "misplaced" and "poorly choreographed". Devika K. of The Week felt the visual depiction of the song being problematic as certain parts of the song were picturized on the dancer's (de Sousa) body parts blatantly describing the purpose of female objectification contrast to the film's themes.
