= Amsi Narayanapilla =

Indian writer and activist

Amsi Narayana Pillai
- Born: Narayana Pillai; May , 1896; Amsi, Travancore (Today as part of Kanyakumari District)
- Died: December 9, 1981; Amsi
- Occupation: Founder of Mahathma News paper
- Known for: Author of varika varika sahajare, Freedom fighter
- Political party: Indian National Congress
- Spouse: Thankamma
- Parents: Thanupilla Uthampilli (father); Kunju Lakshmi (mother)
- Relatives: children : Vasantha lakshmi Amsi, Chandrika Devi Amsi, Renuka Devi Amsi, Amsi Mukundan Nair, Murali Amsi, Amsi Madhu, Sudha Kumari Amsi

Amsi Narayana Pillai (1896 – 1981) was a well-known poet, journalist and freedom fighter in Kerala. Amsi Narayana Pillai's "varika varika sahajare" (Come on, come on time for hard times), captured the heart of the people of Kerala, during the Indian freedom struggle. He wrote this song for the salt satyagraha from Kozhikode Vadakara to Payyanur.

== Biography ==
=== Early life and background ===
Narayana Pillai was born in 1896 in the small village of Amsi, Thengapattanam, Kanyakumari District to Thanu Pillai and Lakshmi Pillai. Amsi Narayana Pillai grew up hearing the tales of freedom fighters like Veluthampi Dalava, Ayyappan Marthandan Pillai which influenced on him and inspired him in later years to renounce a Government job and dedicate his life towards the cause of Indian Independence. Narayana Pillai left the clerk in the Travancore Police Department and joined the Indian independence movement.

=== Journalism ===
He worked as sub-editor of Swaraj, a weekly published by A.K Pillai for some time. In 1924, he launched the Mahatma weekly at Trivandrum, with the blessings of Gandhi. The Mahatma aimed at spreading Gandhian values among the general public. His early poems were published in Mahatma. The early Socialist Organization, Youth League under the leadership of Kelappan, started with the song written by the Amsi. Amsi participated in Vaikom Sathyagraha, Guruvayoor Sathyagraha and actively encouraged the people to join via his weekly .

=== Salt March ===
In 1930, a group of 25 people under leadership of Ponnara Sridhar, N.C Shekhar and Amsi Narayana Pillai stated a march from Trivandrum to join the Salt Satyagraha in Kozhikode. The group sang the "varika varika sahajare" song along the way. All three governments (Travancore, Cochin and Malabar) banned the song. On the basis of a ban, Amshi was sentenced to six months in prison in Viyyur. The Thrissur Magistrate Court has summoned Amshi for participation in the Salt Satyagraha and the writing of the revolutionary song. The song was also published in his Padayalikalude pattukal (Songs of Soldiers) book.

In 1941 Amsi started a high school Amsi High School in his native village to enable education to hundreds of illiterates in that area at that time.

== Literary works ==
Amsi was a prolific writer/poet who wrote books on various subjects (songs of the soldiers, Gandhi Ramayana, poems from the prison etc.) novel, Dramas, Sanskrit plays and essays on Gandhism among others.

He composed the "Gandhi Ramayana" a modern version of the great Indian epic depicting Gandhiji as Rama, the nation as Sita and the British Government as Ravana. The poem that became highly popular among the Nationalists at that time.

During Indian independence movement, the Government of Madras State has banned many of his works.

His patriotic song "Varika varika sahajare" used in 2019 Prithviraj directed Mohanlal film Lucifer, writer Murali Gopy sung the song.
