= Killiyur, Kanniyakumari =

Killiyoor
- Town
- Location in Tamil Nadu, India
- Coordinates: 8°16′50″N 77°10′43″E
- Country: India
- State: Tamil Nadu
- District: Kanniyakumari

Population (2001)
  - Total: 19,275

Languages
  - Official: Tamil
  - Spoken: Tamil, Malayalam
- Time zone: UTC+5:30 (IST)

Killiyoor is a panchayat town in Kanniyakumari district in the Indian state of Tamil Nadu.

Killiyoor is one of the 6 taluks in the Kanniyakumari district. It includes the revenue blocks of Munchirai and Killiyoor.

== Demographics ==
Religions in Killiyoor
Religion	Percent
Christians	66.30%
Hindus	33.33%
Muslims	0.17%
Others	0.20%

As of 2001 India census, Killiyoor had a population of 19,275. Males constitute 51% of the population and females 49%. Killiyoor has an average literacy rate of 75%, higher than the national average of 59.5%: male literacy is 77%, and female literacy is 72%. In Killiyoor, 11% of the population is under 6 years of age.

== Politics ==
Killiyoor (State Assembly Constituency) is part of Kanniyakumari Lok Sabha constituency.

State Assembly Representatives from Killiyoor are

1. .R.Ponnapa Nadar
2. A.Neasamony
3. William
4. N.Dennis
5. P.Vijayarahavan
6. Dr. D. Kumaradas
7. S.John Jacob
8. Rajesh Kumar
