= Cross of Christ Lutheran Church =

Historic church in Minnesota, United States

- U.S. National Register of Historic Places
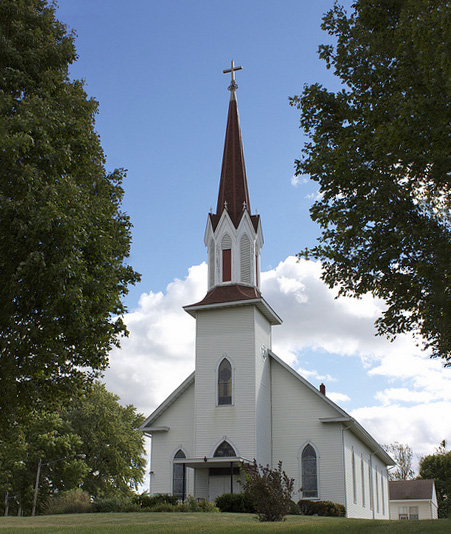

- Location within Minnesota Location within the United States
- Nearest city: Red Wing, Minnesota
- Coordinates: 44°36′0″N 92°43′47″W
- Area: 5 acres (2.0 ha)
- Built: 1878
- Architect: Johnson, Charles E.
- Architectural style: Gothic Revival
- MPS: Rural Goodhue County MRA
- NRHP reference No.: 80002057
- Added to NRHP: February 12, 1980

Cross of Christ Lutheran Church is a historic church in Welch Township, Minnesota, United States, near the city of Red Wing, Minnesota. It was built in 1878 and was added to the National Register of Historic Places in 1980 as an example of the characteristic steepled churches built in the Swedish American communities of Southeast Minnesota.
