= Puliyoorkurichi =

Coordinates: 8°14′38″N 77°19′55″E

Puliyoorkurichi (Tamil: புலியூர்குறிச்சி, also transliterated as Puliyurkurichi or Puliurkuruchi) is a small village in the Indian state of Tamil Nadu. It is a suburb of Padmanabhapuram, about 3 kilometres (1.9 mi) southeast of Thuckalay on the Trivandrum-Nagercoil Highway.

== Udayagiri Fort ==
Puliyoorkurichi is adjacent to Udayagiri Fort, its principal point of interest.

The fort was named after King Udayanan of the Padmanabhapuram, and was originally the camping and training ground for the king’s army. Some remains of the furnace used for making ammunition survive. The fort became a natural park with a treehouse, herbal garden, deer and bird enclosures, and an aquarium.

== Geography ==
Puliyoorkurichi covers some 250 square kilometres (97 sq mi).

== Demographics ==
It has a population of about 2000. Two streets of Brahmin dwellings are in the village: Single Street consists of single row houses and Double Street has a double row of houses.

== Economy ==
The main crops are rice, plantain, and coconut palm.

== Culture ==
A Ganesh temple with Sivaalayam is in a compound in the Single Street. The koil (temple) is called Pillayaar Koil. The speciality of this Pillayaar Koil is that people connected or even outsiders come and pray for their wishes. Most of the wishes are fulfilled and in return people offer 1008 " Kozhakattai" (Mothakam) made of poor am covered by rice flower. Almost 200 days/year people offer thanks to Ganesh. Once this Gramam had enough properties to look after the temple, but now it depends on contributions. The Siva temple in the same compound is maintained by the state government.

In Double Street a Ramar Koil sits, where regular Bhajans were held. All Hindu celebrations are performed in the village cost.

This village performs "Padukkai" to Melankode Amman Koil every year, as the villagers feel that Melankode is their Kaval Theivam.

== Education ==
An engineering college is also situated near this village.
