= Colachel =

- Town
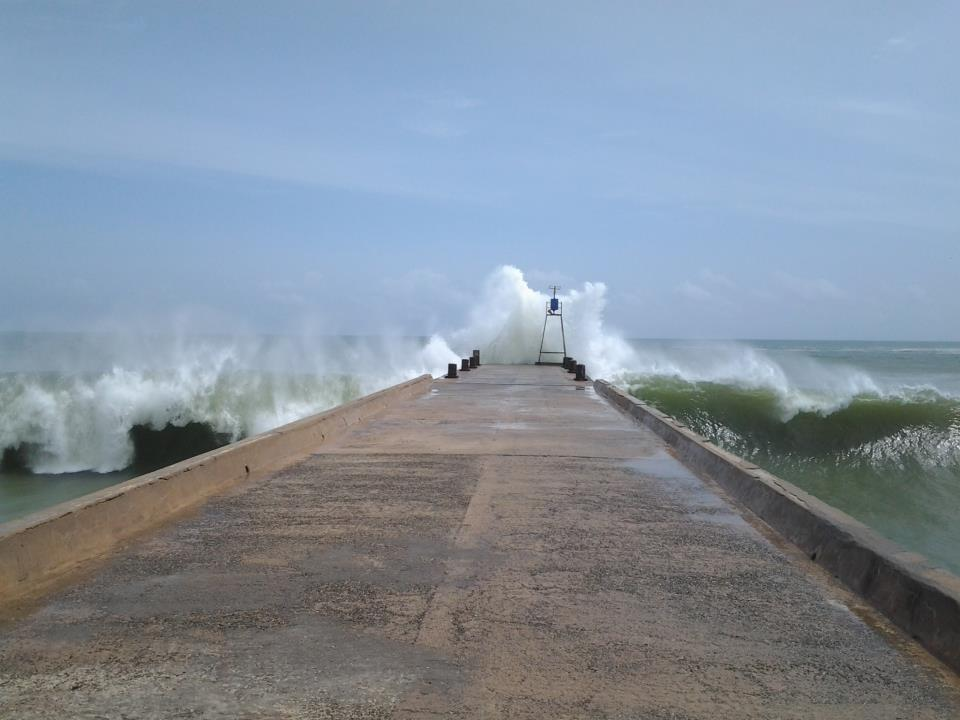
- Colachel harbour

- Colachel, Kanniyakumari (Tamil Nadu)
- Coordinates: 8.178600°N 77.256100°E
- Country: India
- State: Tamil Nadu
- District: Kanniyakumari

Government
  - Type: First Grade Municipality
  - Body: Colachel Municipality
- Elevation: 56 m (184 ft)

Population (2011)
  - Total: 23,227

Languages
  - Official: Tamil
  - Spoken: Tamil, Malayalam
- Time zone: UTC+5:30 (IST)

Colachel (Tamil/Malayalam: Kulachal, IPA: [kuɭɐt͡ʃːɐl]) is a Town in the far south of India, located in the Kanyakumari district of Tamil Nadu. It is a natural harbor on the Malabar Coast, located 20 km northwest of Kanyakumari (Cape Comorin), the southernmost tip of India. As of 2011, the municipality had a population of 23,227 and a metropolitan population of 47,007.

== History ==
Colachel is an ancient port town, that Vasco da Gama called ‘Colachi’. Before the State re-organization in 1956, it was part of the Travancore State. After the defeat of the Dutch by King Anizham Thirunal Marthanda Varma in 1741, a victory pillar had been erected near the beach in commemoration of the victory. The town is bounded on the south by Arabian Sea. It has Pampoori Vaikal in its Western side. Nagercoil the headquarters of Kanyakumari District is 20 km away from this town in the North East Direction.

=== Battle of Colachel ===
Colachel was the location of the battle between the Travancore (Anglicised form of Thiruvithaamkoor) King Marthanda Varma (1729–1758) forces led by the thiruvithaamkoor nair patalam(body guards of the king) and Anantha Padmanaban Nadar and the Dutch East India Company forces led by Admiral Eustachius De Lannoy on 10 August 1741. It was the first time in Indian history that an Asian country defeated a European naval force.

The Dutch marines landed in Colachel with artillery and captured the land up to Padmanabhapuram, then the capital of Travancore. The arrival of Marthanda Varma from the north forced the Dutch to take up defensive positions in Colachel, where they were attacked and defeated by the Travancore forces. Twenty-eight high level Dutch officers, including Admiral D'lennoy, were captured. The defeat of the Dutch in Colachael was the turning point of the Travancore-Dutch War. D'lennoy went on to serve the Travancore kingdom for the next two decades and was promoted to the post of the Valiya kappithan (Senior Admiral) of the Travancore forces. He modernised the Travancore army, and built the Nedumkottai, a line of fortifications in the north of the kingdom, which held up the army of Tipu Sultan in 1791, during his ill-fated invasion of Travancore. D'lennoy is buried in the Udayagiri Fort, also known as Dillanai kottai (D'lennoy's fort) which is located 7 kilometres north of Padmanabhapuram (about 14 kilometres from Nagercoil).

=== 2004 Tsunami ===
On 26th December 2004, a tsunami of the Indian Ocean caused huge devastation and damages. In Colachel, it caused the death of around 500 people. As the land near the coastline is flat and at sea level with no seawall (anti sea erosion), water travelled inland carving out new streams and estuaries. The waves were reported to be around 5m high and a run up height of 2.6m. Maximum number of casualties happened near the A.V.M. Canal as well as around the open trenches being used by the local coconut fibre industry. Colachel is said to be the last place (southwards) which is affected severely by tsunami.

The government and several non-governmental agencies have been providing relief works for those affected by the tsunami.

== Transport ==
The town is connected to all parts of the state by road. Nagercoil, the district headquarters of Kanyakumari is situated 47 km from Colachel in the north-east direction.

The Four lane National Highway under-construction NH66, connecting Kanyakumari and Kerala, bypasses Colachel at a distance of 8 km.

3 State Highways passes through the town, which makes the coastal town well connected to the commercial and tourist hubs in other parts of district and state. 1. SH 179 - Kanniyakumari - Pazhayauchakadai Road, 2. SH 180 - Colachel - Thiruvattar Road, 3. SH 46 - Aralvoimozhi - Nagercoil - Rajakkamangalam - Colachel Road.

The broad gauge rail link between Thiruvananthapuram and Kanyakumari passes at a distance of 9 km from Colachel town. The nearest railway station is at Eraniel.

The nearest Air Terminal to the town is Thiruvananthapuram, the capital of Kerala, which is located 65 km away in the northwest direction.

=== Harbour ===
The existing fishing harbour in the town is now being developed as an integrated fishing terminal with increased vessel berthing capacity. The new harbour will be constructed jointly by Chennai and Tuticorin port (Voc Port)

== Geography ==
The town is located on the western coastal side of Kanyakumari District and falls in the coordinates of 8.15°N 77.14°E. The average elevation of the town is 25 meters (82 ft) above Mean Sea Level (MSL). Town is mostly characterized by a flat terrain with a few areas in the northwest region having elevation difference with other parts of the town. Generally the town is sloped gently from North to south direction and also sloping in a radial direction towards centre portion of the town from east and west directions.

=== Climate ===
The maximum and minimum temperature average around 33 °C and 22 °C respectively. The average annual rainfall is 1,400 mm. The rainfall is distributed from the months of April to December which falls under three seasons namely hot weather seasonal rainfall, South West monsoon and North East monsoon.

=== Soil type ===
The soil is generally red gravel but sandy loam soil also exists in some places. Rice was the predominant crop cultivated until 1980's. Coconut cultivation has been replacing paddy since 1980. Other crops cultivated includes Tapioca, legumes, cashews, Tamarind.

=== Demographics ===
According to 2011 census, Colachel had a population of 23,227 with a sex-ratio of 974 females for every 1,000 males, much above the national average of 929. A total of 2,661 were under the age of six, constituting 1,361 males and 1,300 females. Scheduled Castes and Scheduled Tribes accounted for 1.96% and .% of the population respectively. The average literacy of the town was 80.52%, compared to the national average of 72.99%. The town had a total of : 5205 households. There were a total of 7,902 workers, comprising 185 cultivators, 131 main agricultural labourers, 183 in house hold industries, 6,624 other workers, 779 marginal workers, 11 marginal cultivators, 110 marginal agricultural labourers, 83 marginal workers in household industries and 575 other marginal workers.

== Places of interest ==
This small coastal town is near to the route from Thiruvananthapuram to Kanyakumari on National Highway 47 in present-day state of Tamil Nadu's Kanyakumari district in India. It is situated very close to Mahendragiri, where the Indian Space Research Organisation's rocket testing facility is located. Efforts are being made by the port advisory committee for the construction of a ship yard and for the development of a natural harbour at Colachel.

Maramadi beach is a local tourist attraction. Maramadi St. Antony's church is the most important church in Colachel. People often visit to see the Basilica Of Our Lady Of Presentation and prayer hall at Colachel. In and around Colachel, there are many Catholic churches such as St. Joseph's Church, Kalimar, St. Anthony's Roman Catholic Church, Colachel erected by the generosity of the patron Richard F. H. Crowther, bishop leon's nagar our lady of perpetual help church and catholic chapels such as, or Christ the King Chapel.

Other places of attraction near Colachel include Padmanabhapuram palace and Pechupparai dam. One of the most important Hindu shrine is the Mandaikkadu Bhagwathi Temple at Mandaikkadu. An annual Pongala is held at the Temple which attracts scores of devotees.

There is a very ancient church, locally known as Thomayar koil at Thiruvithamcode on the way to Azhakiyamandapam claiming its ancestry to 63 AD and believed to be consecrated by none other than St.Thomas, the apostle of Jesus. This was recently declared as an International Pilgrim Centre (Arappally) of the Syrian Christians of Kerala, the neighboring State.

There is one version that Adi Sankara composed Soundaryalahari after seeing the sunrise, sunset and moon rise on the full moon day of the Tamil month of Chithrai at Kanyakumari praising the virgin Goddess. The beauty of Devi Kanyakumari reflects in the opening lines of his divine work. On the golden sands of Kanyakumari stand the shrines of Adi Sankara with his disciples, Swami Vivekananda in meditative mood and Gandhi Smarak Mandir in Oryan style. The reputed Vivekananda Rock Memorial on the sea-girl rock is a "visible symbol of invisible strength, invisible faith and burning devotion that Swami Vivekananda personified". Near Gandhi Smarak Mandir stands a memorial to our beloved leader Karmaveerar Kamaraj. The off shore 133 feet tall statue of Thiruvalluvar at Kanyakumari is a notable landmark of Tamil Nadu tourism places.

=== Colachel Pillar ===
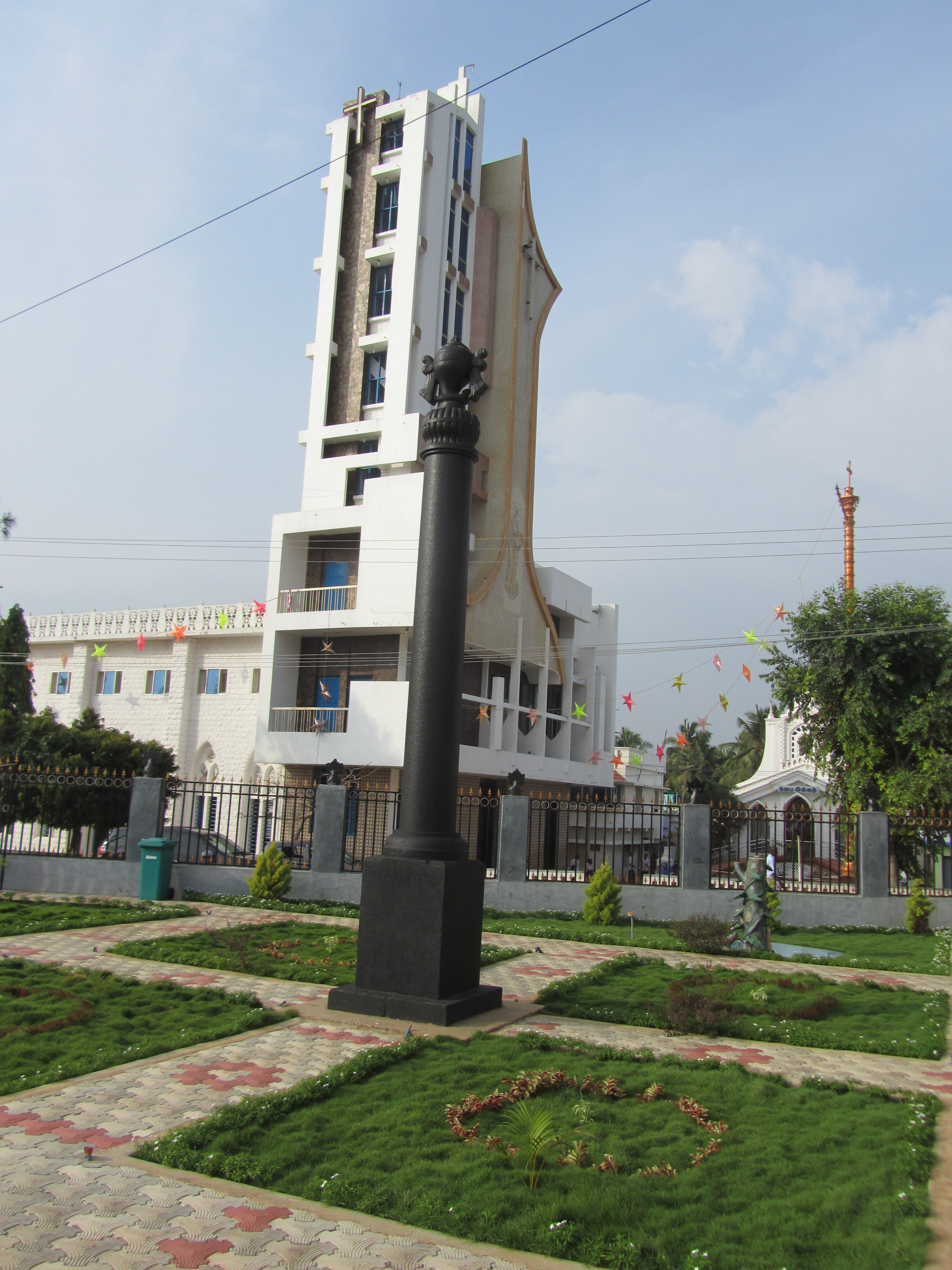
Colachel pillar

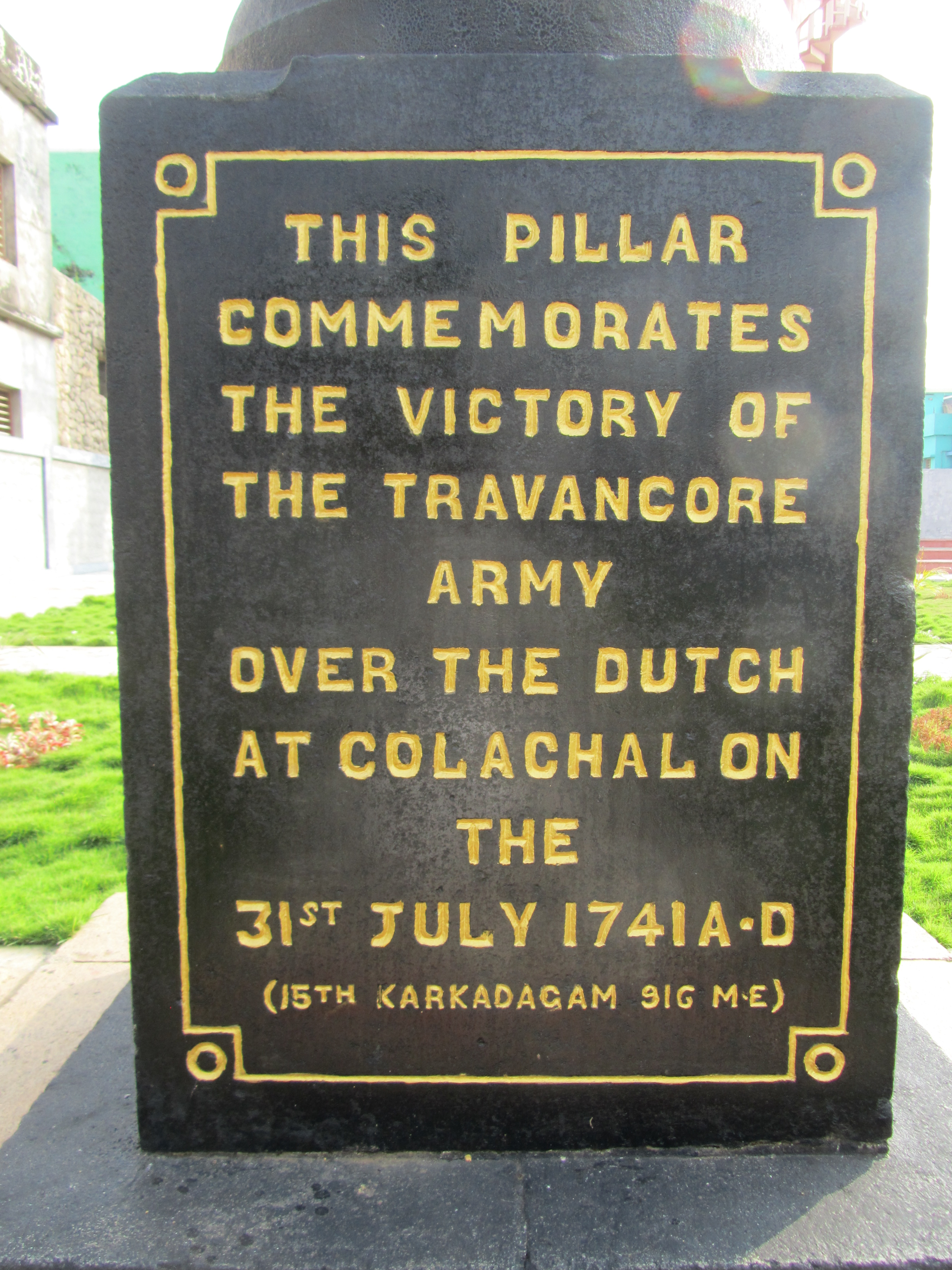
Colachel Pillar inscription

Colachel is currently in the Kanya Kumari District of the Tamil Nadu State of India, and is an important port on the west coast of that state. The Travancore Army completely exterminated the superior and better equipped Dutch Forces which landed at Colachal in July 1741 during the reign of the Travancore King, Sree Padmanabhadasa Maharajah Sree Anizham Thirunal Veera Bala Marthanda Varma Kulasekharaperumal. In the battle of Colachal, Capt. Eustace De Lannoy, the Dutch Naval Forces Commander, was captured. In order to commemorate this victory of the Travancore Army over the Dutch at Colachel, the Travancore Government installed the Colachel Pillar at the very spot where the Dutch had capitulated to the King of Travancore. The Colachel Pillar stands 17 feet high and has a radius of four feet. It has conch at the top of the pillar and on its base the following words are inscribed "In memory of the fallen brethren during the battle."

== Politics ==
Colachel assembly constituency is part of Kanyakumari (Lok Sabha constituency) (previously Nagercoil).

Colachel was formed as Grade III Municipality in the year 1920, is one of the oldest municipalities formulated, under Travancore Kingdom. The Municipality consists Colachel as its only revenue village within its jurisdiction and in its LPA. The Municipality of Colachel consists of 24 wards and the elected representatives from each ward constitute the council. Colachel Municipality consists of five functional departments. Each department consists of Head who reports to the Municipal Commissioner and functions as per the responsibilities prescribed in the Act and as delegated by the Commissioner. Mr. Naseer is the incumbent and elected chairman of Colachal municipality. AK Chellaiya was an Indian politician and former Member of the Legislative Assembly. He was elected to the Travancore-Cochin assembly as an Indian National Congress candidate from Colachel separate constituency in 1952 election. Names of some of the previous chairmen are Mr. Jasiah, Mr. M.A. James, Mr. Ismail, Mr. Neelaraj etc. The chronological order of the activities in formulation of the urban local body and its up gradation are listed below:

- Constituted as Grade III Municipality in 1920
- Colachel Local Planning Area was declared in G.O Ms. No. 654 RD & LA dated 16.03.1974 which contains Colachel Municipal limits only. Colachel Local Authority was declared as Colachel Local Planning Authority (LPA) in G.O. Ms. No. 650 RDLA dated 08.04.1975
- Colachel Town was declared as a ‘heritage town’ as per G.O. Ms. No. 191 MA&WS department dated 18.07.1994.
- Upgraded as Second Grade Municipality with effect from 1998 vide the MAWS Department Government Order No.85 dated 22-08-1998.

Indian National Congress, Bharathiya Janata Party, Dravida Munetra Kazhakam, Anna Dravida Munnetra Kazhakam, Viduthalai Chiruthaikal Katchi, Naam Thamizhar, Amma Nakkal Munnetra Kazhakam and Makkal Desam Paraiyar Peravai has acceptably votebanks.

== Economy ==
The people of Colachel do fishing with catamarans, deep sea fishing with mechanized boats, exporting fish, coconut fibre production, fibre works, coir making, palm fibre works, selling general merchandise, agriculture, etc. There used to be a factory for manufacturing fibre based products (Thumbaabees) but is closed now. Also there is a nearby natural mineral extraction factory called Indian Rare Earths Limited. But the local people say that they do not get much employment with this company though the company used to mine for minerals in their localities.

== Education ==
There are two higher secondary schools St. Mary's, one high school (Govt. High School)Ellapavilai, a primary school (St. Mary's Primary School in Colachel beach) and many primary, (Government Middle School colachel) middle schools in this town. Also Karunya Nursery & Primary School in Sasthankarai.There are many matriculation schools also in Colachel. From that Joseph's Matriculation Higher Secondary School in Sastankarai, St. Mary's Matriculation school in Simon colony, St. Joseph's Matriculation school in Velliakulam, Orient Matriculation school in Kamarajar salai and St. Anne's Matriculation School, which is run by the St. Anne's Education and Charitable Trust. There are some nursery schools which were managed and run by the state government of Tamil Nadu is situated in Maramdi street. For higher education few engineering, arts and science colleges are also available in its proximity. V.K.P higher secondary school is one of the old and traditional educational institution founded by V. Krishna Pillai located at the entrance of Colachel town in the state highway of Nagercoil to Marthandam. Carmel Jyothi Matriculation School is run by the C.M.C sisters of Chavara Region, Thuckalay.

== Culture ==
Several folk arts are being practised in temples and churches during the annual festivals. Ayya Narayana swamy Temples in Thiru Yaedu Vassipu (Akilathirattu Ammanai reading), Villupattu, Kaniankoothu, Sakkiyankoothu, Thiruvathirai Kali, Kalial, Paraiyan thullal and Ottam Thullal are some of the folk arts performed during temple festivals. Most usually, rural artists and natives perform Kadhaprasangam, Natagam (drama), rural dances, etc. during the annual festivals of churches and temples. Colachel most searching places in tamil nadu
