= Udayagiri Fort =

Two forts in India

Coordinates: 8.243°N 77.335°E

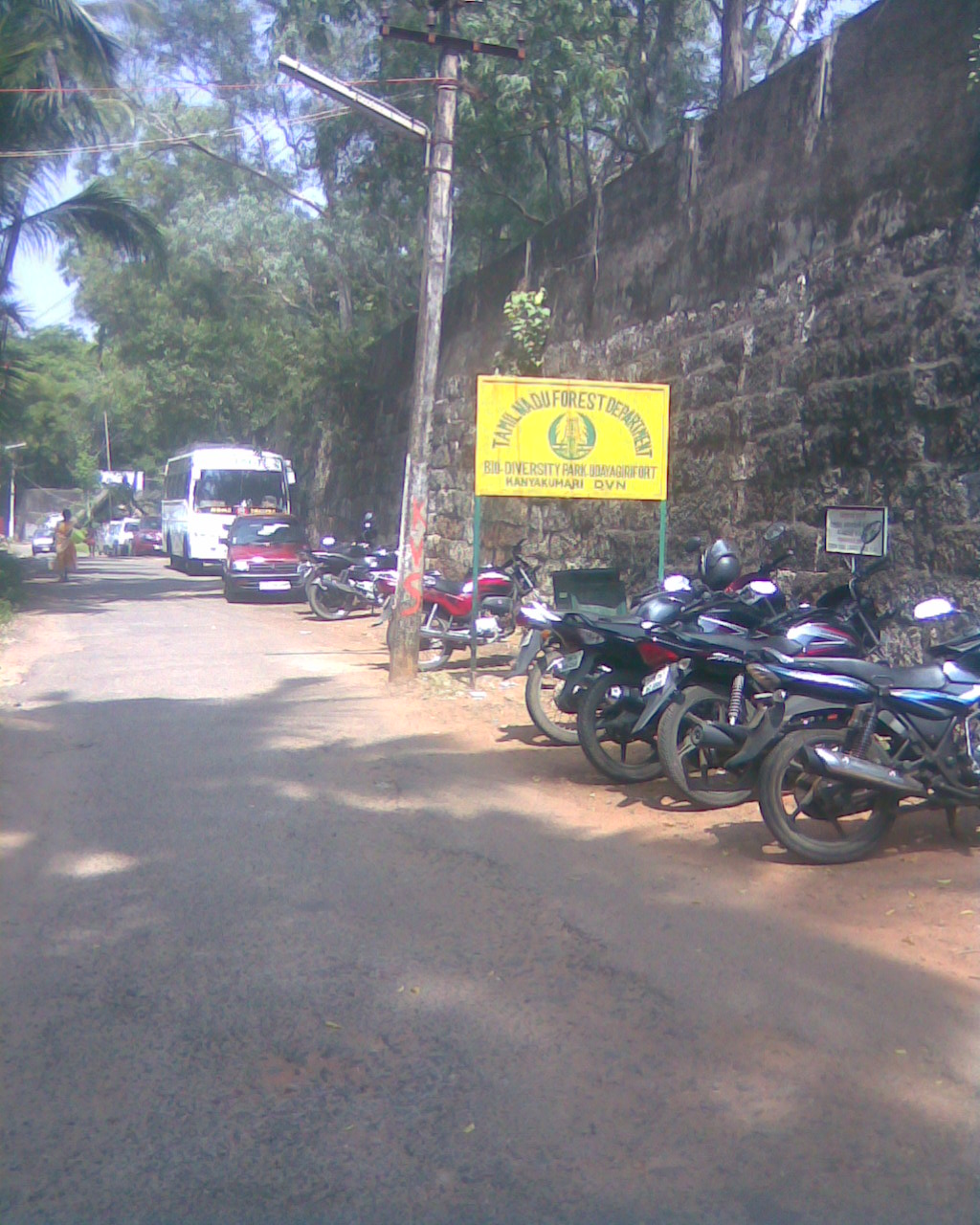
Udayakiri Fort

== Fort in Tamil Nadu (Kanyakumari District) ==
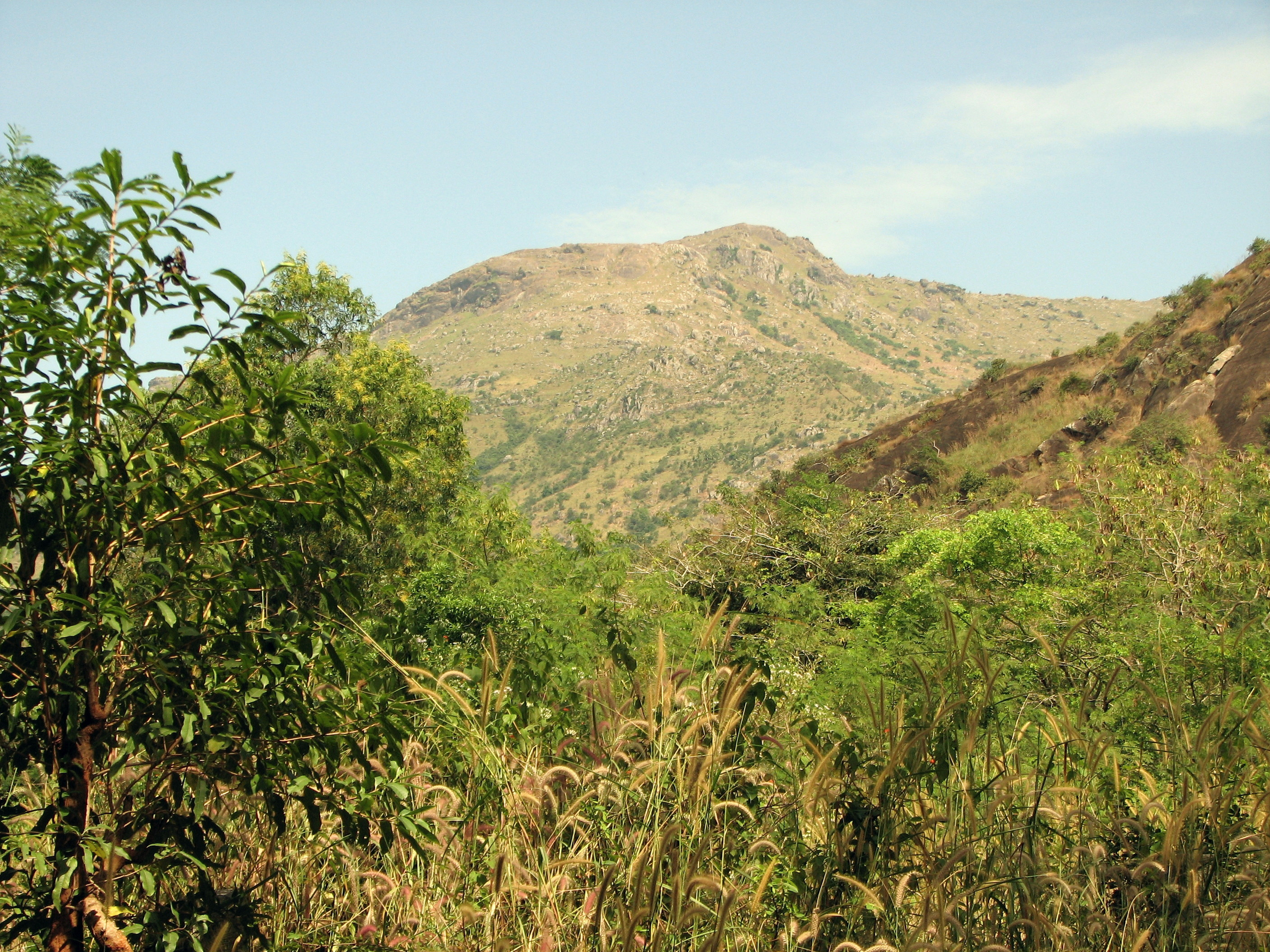
Udayagiri Fort in Kanyakumari District, Tamil Nadu, with a view of the Western Ghats and hillock within the fort.

=== Location ===
The fort in Tamil Nadu is located 14 kilometres (8.7 mi) from Nagercoil in Thuckalay Town, Kanyakumari District on the Thiruvananthapuram-Nagercoil National highway at Puliyoorkurichi. This was the most important military barracks of the rulers, when Padmanabhapuram was their capital.

=== History ===
Originally built in the 17th century, the fort was rebuilt by Maharaja Marthanda Varma of Travancore in the 18th century.

Spanning about 90 acres (36 ha), including an isolated 260 feet (79 m) hillock. The fort contains an old foundry which was used for casting guns.

The fort was rebuilt during the reign of Marthanda Varma, between 1741-44 under the supervision of Eustachius De Lannoy, a Flemish naval commander of the Dutch East India Company, who later served as the Chief of the Travancore Army.

In the early days, the fort was of strategic importance. Prisoners captured in the campaign against Tippu Sultan were confined in the fort for some time. In 1810, the East India Company's Army under Colonel Leger marched into Travancore through the Aramboly Pass (Aralvaimozhi) to quell a rebellion under the leadership of Velu Thambi Dalava.

In later years, English East India Company troops were stationed at the fort until the middle of the 19th century. A foundry for the manufacture of guns, mortars, and cannonballs was established within the fort under the supervision of the resident General.

=== Architecture ===
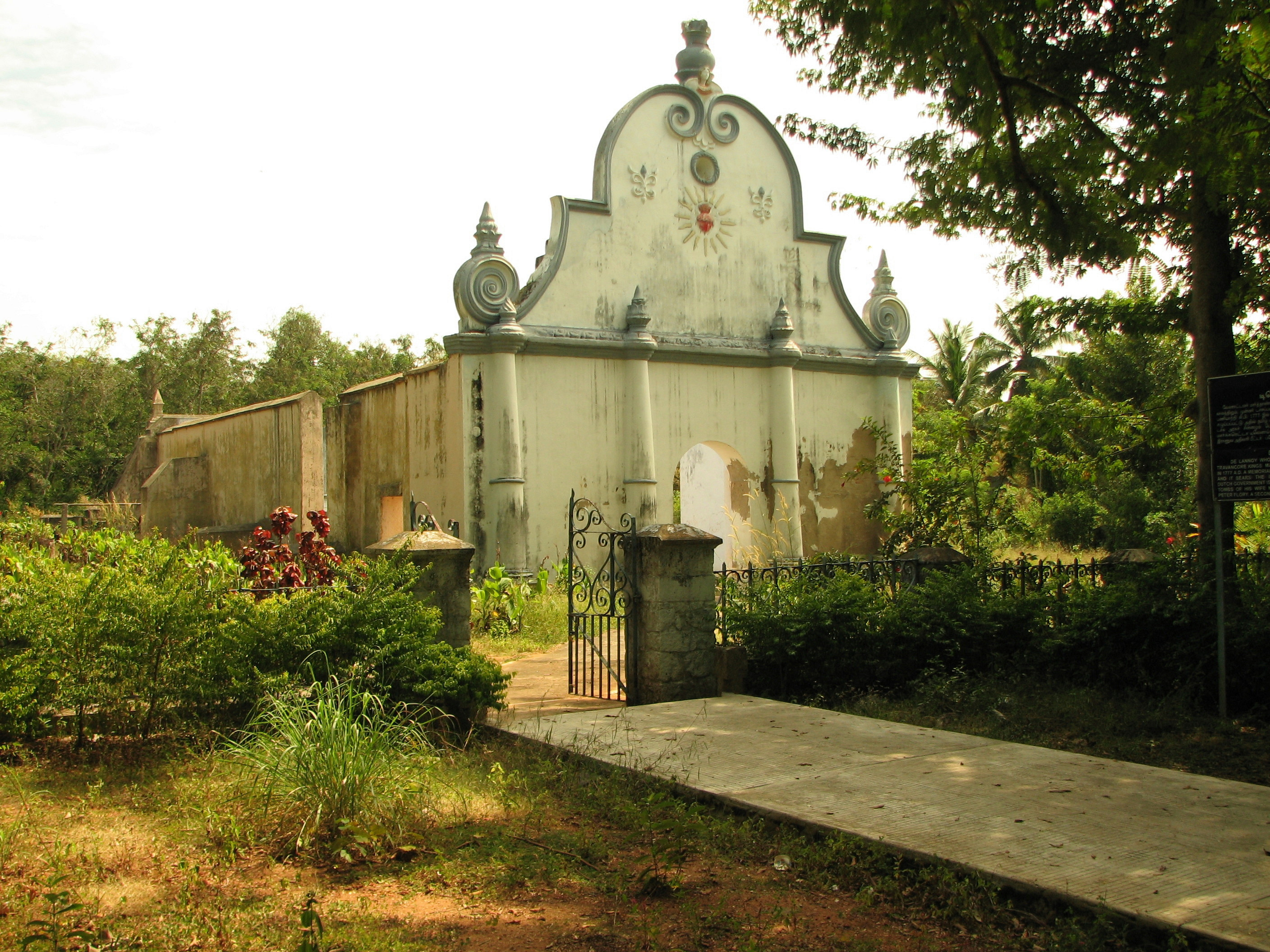
De Lannoy's Tomb at the Udayagiri Fort on the Kanyakumari-Trivandrum highway in Kanyakumari District.

The fort is built of massive granite blocks around an isolated hillock.

The tombs of the Dutch Admiral Eustachius De Lannoy, (in whose honour the fort was once called Dillanai Kottai— De Lennoy's Fort), and of his wife and son can still be found inside a partly ruined chapel in the fort.

De Lannoy's body was buried within the fort and a chapel was built at his burial site. De Lannoy's tombstone lies within the walls of the ruined chapel. The inscriptions on his stone are both in Tamil and in Latin. His wife and son were buried by his side.

In addition to this, there are two tombs. They belong to Shree Mudiyil M K Kesava Pillai, who died in 1968, and his wife, Mrs. M K Kesava Pillai alias L Gourikutty Amma, who died on 19-07-1971. M K Kesava Pillai and his wife, who were the custodians of this property until the Tamil Nadu government acquired this for social forestry. This Fort was a gift from the then Maharaja to Divan Peshkar of Travancore, Sree MK Kesava Pillai. Now, a case is still pending in Chennai against the acquisition.

Recently, officials of the Department of Archaeology found a tunnel within the fort.

Presently, the fort has been turned into a bio-diversity park by the Tamil Nadu forest department, with sites of historical importance, such as De Lannoy's tomb, remaining as protected archaeological sites under the Archaeological Department of India.
