= Unnamalaikadai =

- panchayat town
- Location in Tamil Nadu, India
- Coordinates: 8°18′23″N 77°14′24″E
- Country: India
- State: Tamil Nadu
- District: Kanyakumari

Population (2011)
  - Total: 23,656

Languages
  - Official: Tamil
- Time zone: UTC+5:30 (IST)
- PIN: 629179
- Vehicle registration: TN75

Unnamalaikadai is a panchayat town in Kanyakumari district in the Indian state of Tamil Nadu.

This panchayat town is located at a distance of one km from Marthandam on the way to Kulasekaram.

== Demographics ==
Unnamalaikadai is a Town Panchayat city in district of Kanniyakumari, Tamil Nadu. The Unnamalaikadai city is divided into 18 wards for which elections are held every five years. The Unnamalaikadai Town Panchayat has population of 23,656 of which 11,795 are males while 11,861 are females as per report released by Census India 2011.

The population of children aged 0-6 is 2347 which is 9.92% of total population of Unnamalaikadai (TP). In Unnamalaikadai Town Panchayat, the female sex ratio is 1006 against state average of 996. Moreover, the child sex ratio in Unnamalaikadai is around 922 compared to Tamil Nadu state average of 943. The literacy rate of Unnamalaikadai city is 92.25% higher than the state average of 80.09%. In Unnamalaikadai, male literacy is around 94.96% while the female literacy rate is 89.59%.

Unnamalaikadai Town Panchayat has total administration over 5,969 houses to which it supplies basic amenities like water and sewerage. It is also authorize to build roads within Town Panchayat limits and impose taxes on properties coming under its jurisdiction.

== Residential Area ==
Nesaraj Nagar is a residential area located in between Marthandam & Unnamalaikadai which is under Unnamalaikadai Panchayat. The landmark of this area is opposite to Child Jesus Matriculation Higher Secondary School. A new residential area has emerged behind Nesaraj Nagar. Rotary Club of Marthandam and Indian Medical Association are nearby landmarks.

== Churches ==
There is a famous Roman Catholic Church located in Unnamalaikadai Junction.

== Schools ==
1. Child Jesus Matriculation Higher Secondary School

2. Government Primary School

== Hospitals ==
1. Primary Health Centre, Unnamalaikadai Junction

2. Homeopathy Clinic, Near Govt. Primary School

3. Siddha Clinic, Nesaraj Nagar

4. Govind Ayurveda Health Care, Unnamalaikadai

== Market ==
There is a small fish market near Unnamalaikadai Junction.

== Post Office and Banks ==
Unnamalaikadai Post Office - Pincode - 629179

1. Unnamalaikadai Primary Agricultural Co-operative Credit Society

2. Canara Bank
