= Munchirai block =

Revenue block in India

Munchirai block is a revenue block in the Kanyakumari district of Tamil Nadu, India. It has a total of 11 panchayat villages.
