= Killiyoor block =

Revenue block in India

Killiyoor block is a revenue block in the Kanyakumari district of Tamil Nadu, India. It has a total of 8 panchayat villages.
