= Thengapattanam =

Town in Tamil Nadu, India

- town
- Location within Tamil Nadu Location within India
- Coordinates: 08°14′25″N 77°10′23″E
- Country: India
- State: Tamil Nadu
- District: Kanyakumari
- Founder: Malik Deenar and fellow Arab Traders
- Named for: coconuts
- Elevation: 0 m (0 ft)

Population (2017)
  - Total: 4,361

Languages
  - Official: Tamil.
- Time zone: UTC+5.30 (IST)
- PIN: 629173
- Telephone code: 04651
- Vehicle registration: TN-75
- Nearest city: Nagercoil & Trivandrum
- Lok sabha constituency: Kanyakumari
- Vidhan Sabha: Killiyur
- HDI: High
- Nearest Airport: Trivandrum International Airport

Thengapattanam (also referred to as "Thengapattinam", thennaipattinam" and "thenpattinam" ), named after dense coconut grooves, is a major trade and tourism centre in the painkulam panchayath along the coastal plains of Kanyakumari district. Thengapattanam, once part of Travancore and later Kerala, was added to Tamil Nadu on 1 November 1956 along with some parts of today's Kanniyakumari District.

== Etymology ==
Thengappattanam derives its name from the abundance of coconut groves sprout along the vast estuary, meaning the town/city with coconut trees in abundance. The word Thenga(i) is found in Malayalam/Tamil refers to coconut/palm; The suffix "pattanam" is derived from "pattinam", a Tamil word which means coastal town or a city. Thus "Thenga+pattanam" became Thengapattanam in the later years. Also, acclaimed Malayalam/Arabic novels on Islamic history refers to this town as Naariyal pathathan, Naariyal meaning "coconut", and pathathan is an Arabic word for town.

== History ==
Capital of "Thenga Nadu"

Chilappathikaram, the Tamil epic refers thengapattanam as the capital of "thenga nadu" – one of the 48 countries of lemuria, otherwise known as ‘kumari kandam’, where the Dravidian civilizations known as the ‘cradle of civilizations’ flourished. The world renowned historical research traveler ‘dalami’ refers this place as a ‘harbour town’ in this book written in ad 100. The king of ‘thenga nadu’ karunan thadangal is said to have ruled from here.

Dutch Invasion

This area, once under the domain of chera, pandya and nayakkar kings, was later ruled by the kings of travancore. Attingal queen got the right to rule this area in ad 1700. During this time in the middle of the 17th century, the naval forces headed by the Dutch colonel nicolfwar besieged this town and gained control of it. The Dutch records of ‘wrin-de-herik’ state that after the take over a Dutch infantry division, a go down and a church were established here in ad 1678. In ad 1694, the forces attingal queen fought the Dutch, chased them out and regained its control.

The rule of Venad

The Dutch again attacked thengapattinam, when it became part of ‘venad’ under the rule of marthanda varma maharaja. during this battle fought to chase out the Dutch, many Muslims lost their lives.

The ‘kuntadipattan paarai’ which came under the heavy attack of the Dutch cannons stand out to be a ‘living memorial’ today. Later, due to the ‘Tamil nadu liberation movement’ this part was annexed to Tamil Nadu in 1956.

Raja Kesavadas, the then divan of the king Rama Varma of Travancore, was brought up in his youth in the "puthen veedu" here.

== Geography ==
=== Topography ===
Thengapattanam is located in the South western coast of India bordering the Arabian Sea to the west, Western Ghats to the north, and vast fertile plains with intermittent Rocky hills to the east. The town is 11 km into the Tamil Nadu border from Kerala. The Kerala state capital Thiruvananthapuram is 45 km away from here, whereas Nagercoil is 35 km away. It shares borders with Erayumanthurai, and Amsi villages on either side. The mean elevation of the town is 9 ft (2.7 m) with the highest point Chentapalli Rock being 50 ft (15 m) high above sea level. The Thamirabarani River wraps around most parts of the Kanyakumari district and becomes Kuzhithurai River before reaching Thengapattanam Estuary.

The AVM Canal (Anantha Victoria Marthandam Canal) commissioned by Marthanda Varma Maharaja in the 1860s to facilitate smooth trade, and navigation, passes through this town, the waterway lost its signiface and consequently had to cess operation in the 1980s following the establishment of roadways, unmitigated moderation, and unlawful encroachments adjoining the canal. The Canal, while it functioned, merged with Thamirabarani River River at Thengapattanam, and formed a basin known as Valiyar. The development project mooted to revive AVM Canal Waterways would link Thengapattanam with Kanyakumari in the east and Kasargode in the north-west in Kerala, when it becomes operational.

=== Geology ===
Thengapattanam is classified under the Seismic Zone III, indicating a moderate risk of damage from earthquakes.

=== Climate ===
The climate here is classified under Köppen–Geiger climate classification system as As/Aw/Am, as an implication the town experiences moderate tropical climates ranging from monsoon to Savannah dry influenced by the vicinity to Thermal equator. The town has been an annual recipient of unusually high rainfall from both the North-East and South-west monsoons. The South-western monsoon spans the months of June till September, and the North-Eastern monsoon period commences by the October and winds up in the mid or late December. On an average, the Town receives 2100mm of rainfall with 104 rainy days. The summer here, spanning from the month of May to late June, is tropical dry and may reach a peak of 34 °C. The average Humidity in summer is around 74% percentage, while in June the humidity surfaces the 90% mark. The temperature during winter, on the other hand, reaches a low of 20 °C as the night falls. The winter season is marked by high precipitation and moderate rainfall.

Climate data for Thengapattanam (Kanyakumari District) (1971–2010)
Month	Jan	Feb	Mar	Apr	May	Jun	Jul	Aug	Sep	Oct	Nov	Dec	Year
Record high °C (°F)	34.4 (93.9)	34.7 (94.5)	36.0 (96.8)	36.8 (98.2)	38.2 (100.8)	36.2 (97.2)	35.2 (95.4)	35.9 (96.6)	35.5 (95.9)	35.2 (95.4)	34.3 (93.7)	33.6 (92.5)	38.2 (100.8)
Mean daily maximum °C (°F)	31.0 (87.8)	31.4 (88.5)	32.2 (90.0)	34.1 (93.4)	33.7 (92.7)	33.3 (91.9)	27.8 (82.0)	28.0 (82.4)	29.6 (85.3)	29.1 (84.4)	29.1 (84.4)	28.9 (84.0)	32.3 (90.1)
Mean daily minimum °C (°F)	20.3 (68.5)	23.5 (74.3)	25.0 (77.0)	25.1 (77.2)	24.8 (76.6)	25.9 (78.6)	26.2 (79.2)	22.2 (72.0)	24.2 (75.6)	21.3 (70.3)	24.0 (75.2)	19.1 (66.4)	21.8 (71.2)
Record low °C (°F)	20.1 (68.2)	18.8 (65.8)	21.4 (70.5)	20.9 (69.6)	21.3 (70.3)	19.3 (66.7)	19.0 (66.2)	21.3 (70.3)	21.0 (69.8)	20.8 (69.4)	20.1 (68.2)	19.0 (66.2)	19.0 (66.2)
Average precipitation mm (inches)	61.6 (2.43)	60.8 (2.39)	81.1 (3.19)	119.2 (4.69)	148.0 (5.83)	250.4 (9.86)	288.1 (11.34)	295.3 (11.63)	174.1 (6.85)	141.8 (5.58)	130.9 (5.15)	92.0 (3.62)	2,058.2 (81.03)
Average precipitation days	2.0	4.1	4.3	6.5	9.7	18.6	19.0	20.5	12.9	21.9	19.5	11.4	104.4
Average relative humidity (%)	69	61	73	81	86	88	80	76	77	74	76	74	71
Mean monthly sunshine hours	250.7	253.6	245.8	291.4	303.4	292.3	175.6	156.0	181.2	163.0	182.5	229.8	2,365
Source: India Meteorological Department (record high and low up to 2010)

== Tourist attraction ==
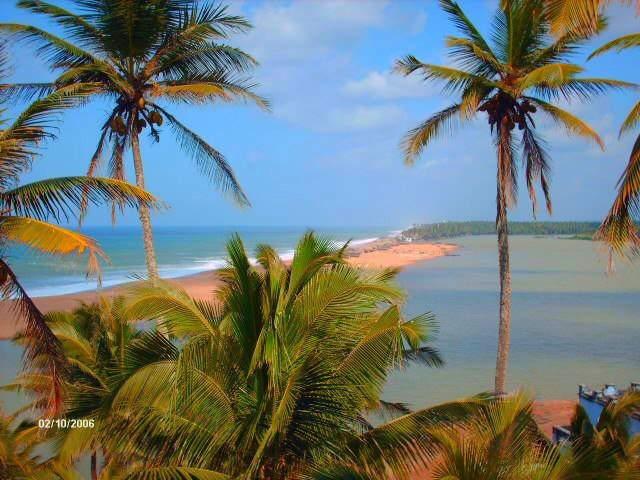
Thengapattanam beach

Thengapattanam has a long seashore with ferry services available. Thengapattanam is a major tourist attraction in the Kanyakumari districtknown for its sea, river, canal, paddy fields, rocky mountains and lush green groves. The water way mooted by the then travancore government popularly known as avm canal originates from Mangalore in Karnataka and reaches Thengapattinam without any hurdles. Even now passengers and goods are ferried through this canal to places like Poothurai, Thoothoor, Vallavilai, Neerodi, Kollencode and Poovar. The merger of the Tamiraparani River here with the Arabian Sea is considered to be especially beautiful. This has also been used to describe the merger of the river with sea (estuary / firth) known as "Pozhi" in local vernacular.

As one of the few picnic spots in the district, the town contains tiny hill-tops where cool wind blows throughout the year.

== Mosques ==
Thengapattanam is home to six mosques that reflect the town’s deep-rooted Islamic heritage. The most prominent among them is the Valiya Palli 8.23973°N 77.17182°E, also known as the Malik Deenar Juma Masjid, believed to be over 1,200 years old. It was built by Malik ibn Deenar (Rahmathulla Alaih), a companion of the Prophet Muhammad, and stands as one of the earliest mosques established in India. Constructed atop natural rock, the mosque features a blend of early brickwork and later additions that show Neo-Arabian and Dravidian influences. Another significant mosque is Attupalli, known for its integration with rocky terrain and its traditional architecture. The other mosques in the town — Rifai Masjid, Kuzhathu Palli, Muhiyuddin Masjid (also called Kadappura Palli), Chenta Palli (now in ruins but still venerated), and the Mohideen (TNTJ) Masjid (affiliated with the TNTJ) — together form an important part of the town’s religious and cultural identity.

== Language ==
Linguistic demography (2011)
1. Tamil (73.0%)
2. Farsi (14.0%)
3. Malayalam (13.0%)

== See also ==
- Munchirai
- Kanyakumari
- Marthandam
