= Karungal =

- Town
- Location in Tamil Nadu, India
- Coordinates: 8°14′16″N 77°11′13″E
- Country: India
- State: Tamil Nadu
- District: Kanniyakumari

Government
  - Type: Democracy
  - Body: Panchayath

Population (2001)
  - Total: 15,832

Languages
  - Official: Tamil
- Time zone: UTC+5:30 (IST)
- Postal code: 629157
- Telephone code: 04651
- Vehicle registration: TN 75

Karungal is a panchayat town in Kanniyakumari district in the Indian state of Tamil Nadu.

== Demographics ==
At the 2001 India census, Karungal had a population of 15,832. Males constituted 49% of the population and females 51%. It had an average literacy rate of 79%, higher than the national average of 59.5%: male literacy is 82%, and female literacy is 76%. 10% of the population were under six years of age.

Karungal is densely populated compared to other panchayats..

== Geography ==
Karungal is the predominant town in Killiyoor, the 234th constituency of Tamil Nadu. After Marthandam, it is the next well-known town, and it spans an area of over 19 square kilometres (7.3 sq mi). Keezhkulam is situated in the southwest, Paliyadi in the northeast, Thiruvithamcode in the east and Thikkanamcode in the southeast.
