= Pallickal Naduvilemuri =

Village in India

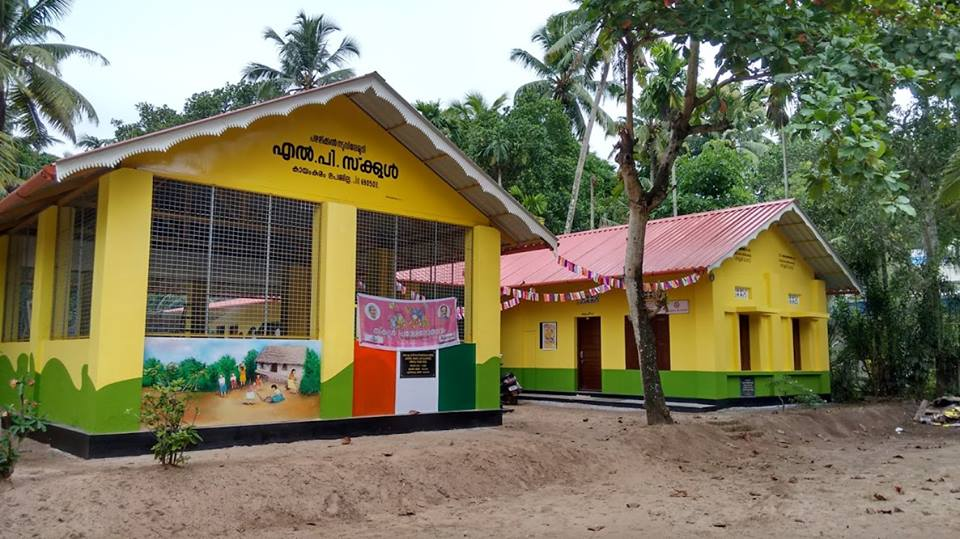
Pallickal Naduvilemuri LP school

Pallickal Naduvilemuri is a small village located in the southern part of Alappuzha district, six kilometers south of Mavelikkara and six kilometers apart from Kayamkulam. The village is known for its temples, which contributed to its name. This place belongs to Onattukara.Total 9 villages/localities come under pincode 690503. Bharanikkavu is a part of Pallickal Naduvilemuri, there are 2 other villages/localities which come under Pallickal Naduvilemuri. Nearby villages include Olakettiambalam, Kurthicad, Mullikulangra, Bharanikavu, Peringala etc.
