= History of Kollam =

Quilon or Coulão, officially Kollam, is one of the ancient civilizations in India. It is one of the oldest port cities in the Malabar Coast (present-day Kerala, Kanyakumari and Tulu region) and was the capital city of historic Venadu Kingdom and Travancore Kingdom. When it was known as Quilon, it was the most popular, advanced, and prosperous city in Malabar Coast. Its significance reduced significantly later when it officially known as Kollam. Quilon was once an important trading port in India. It was also known as Jaysimhanadu or Desinganadu. It is now known as the "Cashew Capital of the World".

== Etymology ==
The popular theory is that the name "Kollam" is derived from the word koyillam, which is a compound of kovilakam (meaning "Royal Palace") and illam (a traditional house of Nair nobles or Brahmins). Another theory posits that the name originates from the Sanskrit word kollam, which means "pepper," as the region was historically a prominent center for the trade and export of pepper.

== Early modern history ==
Since the ancient times, city of Kollam (Quilon) has played some major roles in the business, economical, cultural, religious and political history of Asia and Indian sub continent. The Malayalam calendar (Kollavarsham) is also known so with the name of the city Kollam. The city is mentioned in historical citations dating back to Biblical times and the reign of King Solomon, connecting with Red Sea ports of the Arabian Sea (supported by a find of ancient Roman coins). The teak wood used in building King Solomon's throne was taken from Quilon. Merchants from Phoenicia, China, the Straits of Malacca, the Arab world, Europe and East Africa used to visit and trade from Quilon in the ancient times.

Quilon was a Decentralized state (complex feudal and political relations) under the Influence of the land lords and the barons, known as Madampimar popular among them were the Ettuveetil Pillamar. The authority of the throne was also influenced by the Ettara Yogam (the Yogakkar, Brahmins), the managing committee of the Padmanabhaswamy Temple. There was no standing army. King Marthanda Varma inherited the small feudal state of Quilon and Kottayam, and built it into Travancore. Marthanda Varma led the Marthanda Varma went on to conquer most of the smaller principalities of the native rulers.

The history of the district of Kollam as an administrative unit can be traced back to 1835, when the Travancore state consisted of two revenue divisions with headquarters at Kollam and Kottayam. During the integration of Travancore and Cochin states in Kerala in 1949, Kollam was one among the three revenue divisions in the state. Later, those revenue divisions were converted as the first districts in the state.

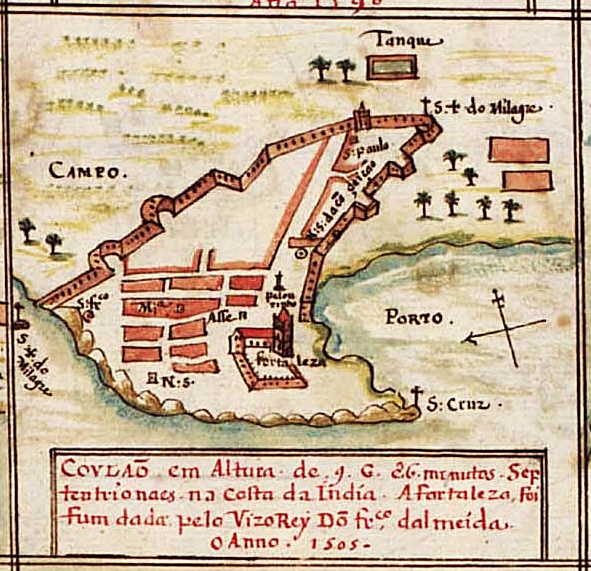
City of Quilon during AD.1500

== Pre-history ==
Kollam is the most historic and ancient settlement in Kerala, probably in South India. Ingots excavated from kollam city, Port, Umayanallur, Mayyanad, Sasthamcotta, Kulathupuzha and Kadakkal proved that the whole district and city were human settlements since Stone Age. Teams of archaeologists and anthropologist have conducted visits to Kollam city and Port many times for treasure hunts and researches.

The period between 1000 BC and 500 AD is referred to as the Megalithic Culture in South India and is similar to the culture in Africa and Europe. In January 2009, the Department of Archaeology discovered a Megalithic age cist burial ground at Thazhuthala in Kollam Metropolitan Area, which had thrown lights to the past glory and ancient human settlements in Kollam area. Similar cists had been earlier discovered from the south east of Kollam. The team discovered three burial chambers, iron weapons, earthen vessels in black and red and remains of molten iron after their first major excavation in Kollam. They found a cairn circle in 1990 during their first major excavation. In August 2009, a team of archaeologists led by Dr P.Rajendran, UGC research scientist and archaeologist at the Department of History of Kerala University, had discovered Lower Paleolithic tools along with the Chinese coins and potteries from the seabed of Tangasseri in the city. This is for the first time that prehistoric cupules and Lower Paleolithic tools were discovered from below the seabed in India. These tools prove that the Stone Age people lived in present Kollam area and surroundings had moved to the coastal areas during the glacial period in the Pleistocene, when the sea-level was almost 300 feet below the present sea-level. Those tools are made of chert and quartzite rocks.

== Ancient history ==
Names, routes and locations of the Periplus of the Erythraean Sea (1st century CE)

The ancient political and cultural history of Kollam was almost entirely independent from that of the rest of Kerala. The Chera dynasty governed the area of Malabar Coast between Kanyakumari in the south to Kasaragod in the north. This included Palakkad Gap, Coimbatore, Salem, and Kolli Hills. The region around Coimbatore was ruled by the Cheras during Sangam period between c. 1st and the 4th centuries CE and it served as the eastern entrance to the Palakkad Gap, the principal trade route between the Malabar Coast and Tamil Nadu.

== Voyages to Quilon/Kollam ==
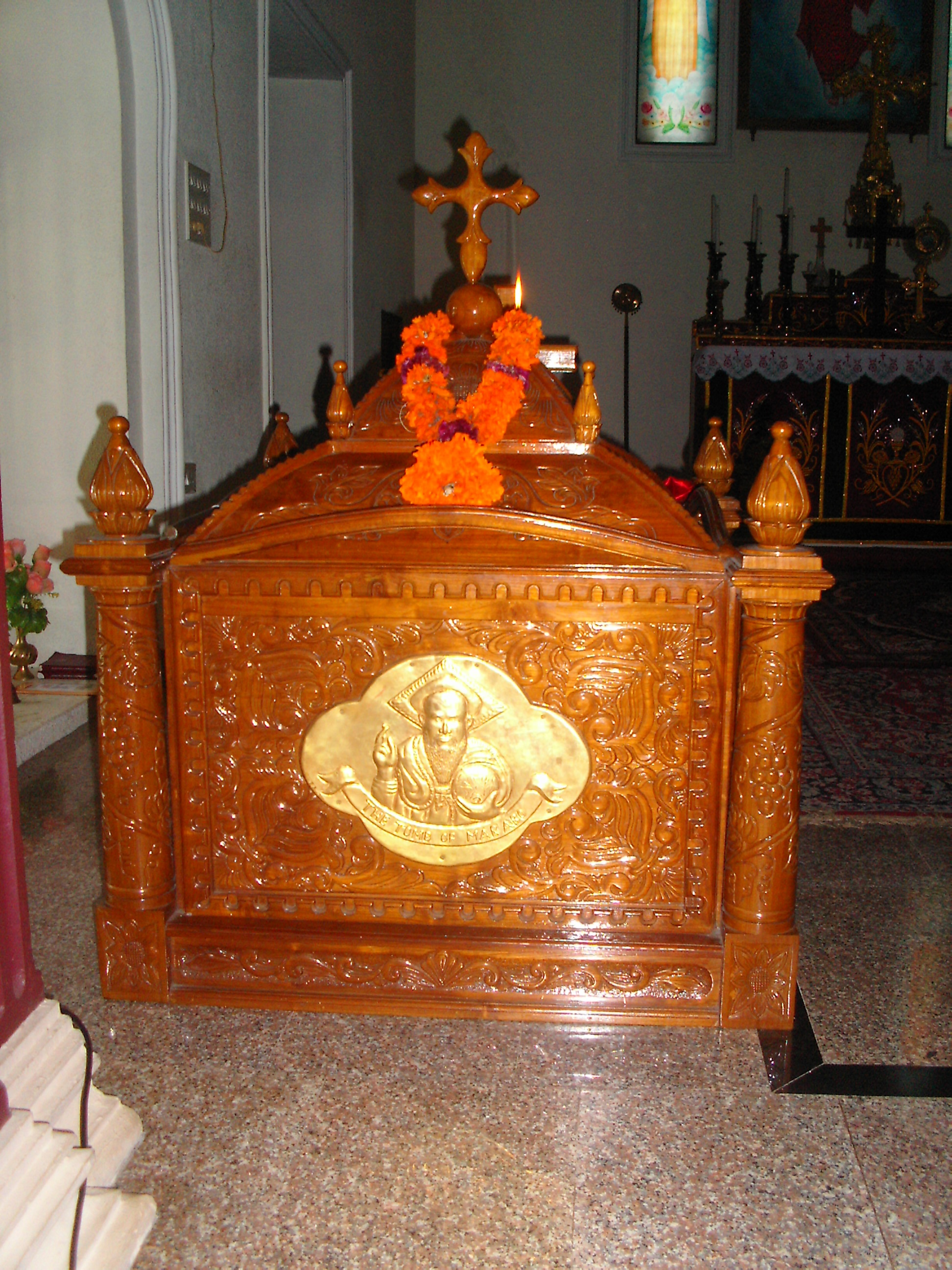
Tomb of Mar Sabor at Marth Mariam church, Thevalakkara in Quilon

Time	Traveller	Country from which he/she came to Quilon	Name they used to mention Quilon
A.D. 23–79	Pliny	Roman Empire	–
A.D. 522	Cosmas Indicopleustes	Alexandria, Greece	Male
A.D. 825	Mar Sabor and Mar Proth	Syria	Coulão
A.D. 845–855	Sulaiman al-Tajir	Siraf, Iran	Male
A.D. 1166	Benjamin of Tudela	Tudela, Kingdom of Navarre (Now in Spain)	Chulam
A.D. 1292	Marco Polo	Republic of Venice	Kiulan
A.D. 1273	Abu'l-Fida	Hamāh, Syria	Coilon / Coilun
A.D. 1311–1321	Jordanus Catalani	Sévérac-le-Château, France	Columbum
A.D. 1321	Odoric of Pordenone	Holy Roman Empire	Polumbum
A.D. 1346–1349	Ibn Battuta	Morocco	--
A.D. 1405–1407; A.D. 1409–1411	Zheng He	Ming China	--
A.D. 1503	Afonso de Albuquerque	Kingdom of Portugal	--
A.D. 1502–1503	Vasco da Gama	Kingdom of Portugal	--
A.D. 1503	Giovanni da Empoli	Kingdom of Portugal	–
A.D. 1510–1517	Duarte Barbosa	Kingdom of Portugal	Coulam
A.D. 1578	Henrique Henriques	Kingdom of Portugal	--

=== Arrival of Thomas the Apostle ===
According to the most widely circulated legend the arrival of Christianity in Kerala begins with the expedition of Saint Thomas, one of the 12 disciples of Jesus in AD 52. He founded Seven Churches in Kerala, started from Maliankara and then Kodungallur, Kollam, Niranam, Nilackal, Kokkamangalam, Kottakkavu and Palayoor.

=== Arrival of Malik Dinar ===
Kollam is also home to one of the oldest mosques in the Indian subcontinent. According to the Legend of Cheraman Perumals, the first Indian mosque was built in 624 AD at Kodungallur with the mandate of the last the ruler (the Cheraman Perumal) of Chera dynasty, who left from Dharmadom to Mecca and converted to Islam during the lifetime of Muhammad (c. 570–632). According to Qissat Shakarwati Farmad, the Masjids at Kodungallur, Kollam, Madayi, Barkur, Mangalore, Kasaragod, Kannur, Dharmadam, Panthalayini, and Chaliyam, were built during the era of Malik Dinar, and they are among the oldest Masjids in the Indian subcontinent. It is believed that Malik Dinar died at Thalangara in Kasaragod town.

== Inception of the Port of Kollam ==
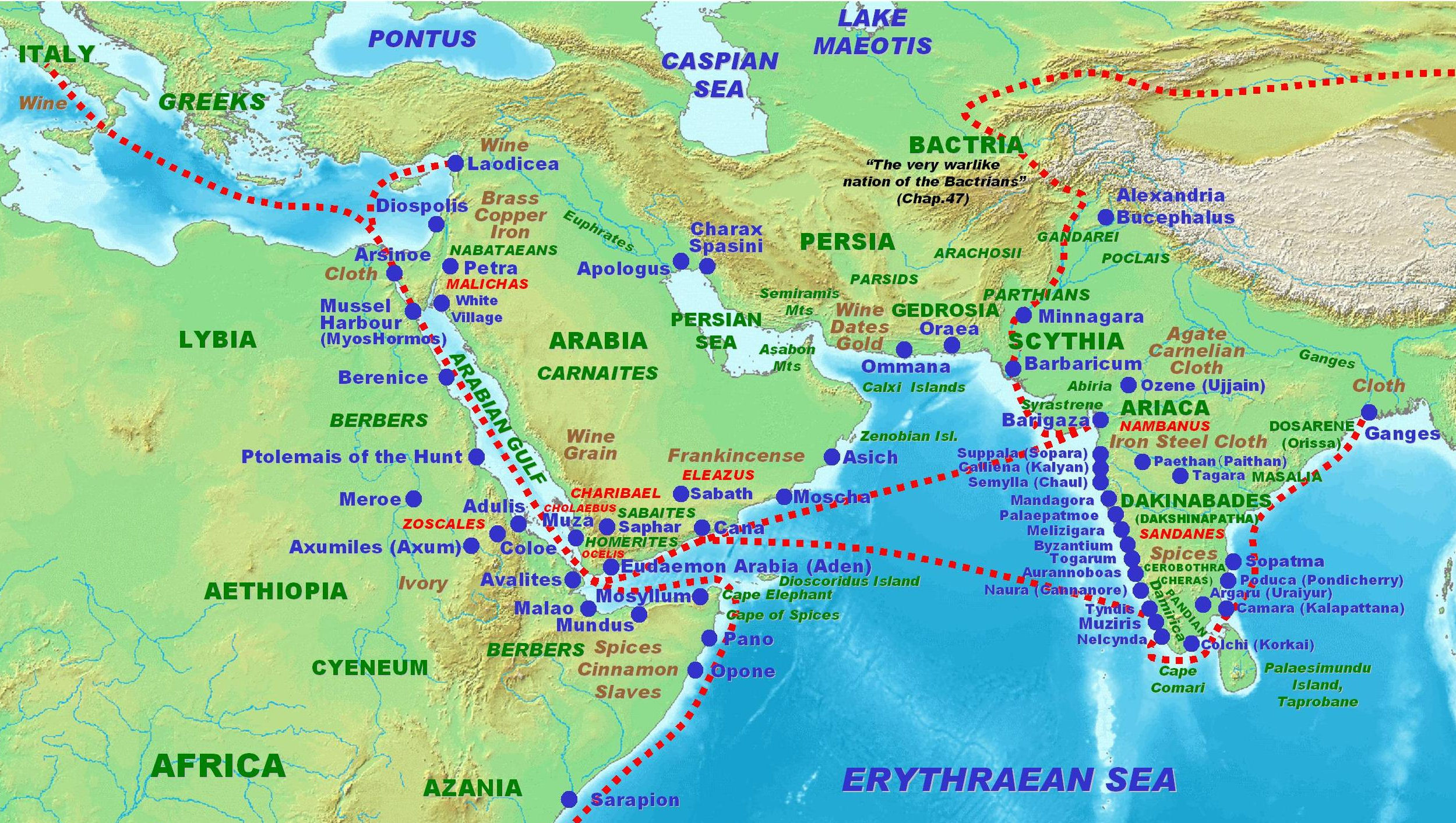
Roman trade with ancient Coastal South West India according to the Periplus Maris Erythraei 1st century AD

In 823 AD, two Persian bishops Mar Sabor and Mar Proth, settled in Quilon with their followers. After the beginning of Kollam Era (825 AD), Quilon became the premier city of the Malabar region ahead of Travancore and Cochin. Kollam Port was founded by Mar Sabore at Thevally in 825 as an alternative to reopening the inland Seaport of Kore-ke-ni Kollam near Backare (Thevalakara), which was also known as Nelcynda and Tyndis to the Romans and Greeks and as Thondi to the Tamils.

Migration of Syriac Christians or Nasranies to Kerala started in the 9th century. Their first migration is dated to the year AD 823 and that was to the city of Quilon.

== Beginning of Kollam Era ==
Kollam Era (also known as Malayalam Era or Kollavarsham or Malayalam Calendar or Malabar Era or Nasrani Era) is a solar and sidereal used in Kerala, India. The origin of the calendar has been dated as 825 CE (Pothu Varsham) at Kollam (Quilon). It replaced the traditional Hindu calendar used widely elsewhere in India and is now prominently used in Kerala. All temple events, festivals and agricultural events in the state are still decided according to the dates in the Malayalam calendar.

There are many theories regarding the origin of the Malayalam calendar – the Kolla Varsham. A major theory is;

According to Herman Gundert Kolla Varsham started as part of erecting a new church Tharissappally Church in Kollam (Thulasserry is a distorted form of Tharissappally which is used by some of the syriac Christians living in and around Kollam) and because of the strictly local and religious background, the other regions did not follow this system at first. Then once the Kollam port emerged as an important trade center the other kingdoms were also started to follow the new system of calendar. This theory backs the remarks of Ibn Battuta as well.

== Persian trade and subsequent Arab trade ==
Sulaiman al-Tajir, a Persian merchant who visited Kerala during the reign of Sthanu Ravi Varma (9th century CE), records that there was extensive trade between Kerala and China at that time, based at the port of Kollam. Quilon to be the only port in India used by the huge Chinese ships as their transshipment hub for goods on their way from China to the Persian Gulf. A number of foreign accounts have mentioned about the presence of considerable Muslim population in the coastal towns. Arab writers such as Al-Masudi of Baghdad (896–956 CE), Muhammad al-Idrisi (1100–1165 CE), Abulfeda (1273–1331 CE), and Al-Dimashqi (1256–1327 CE) mention the Muslim communities in Kerala.

== Copper Plate Inscriptions from Kollam ==
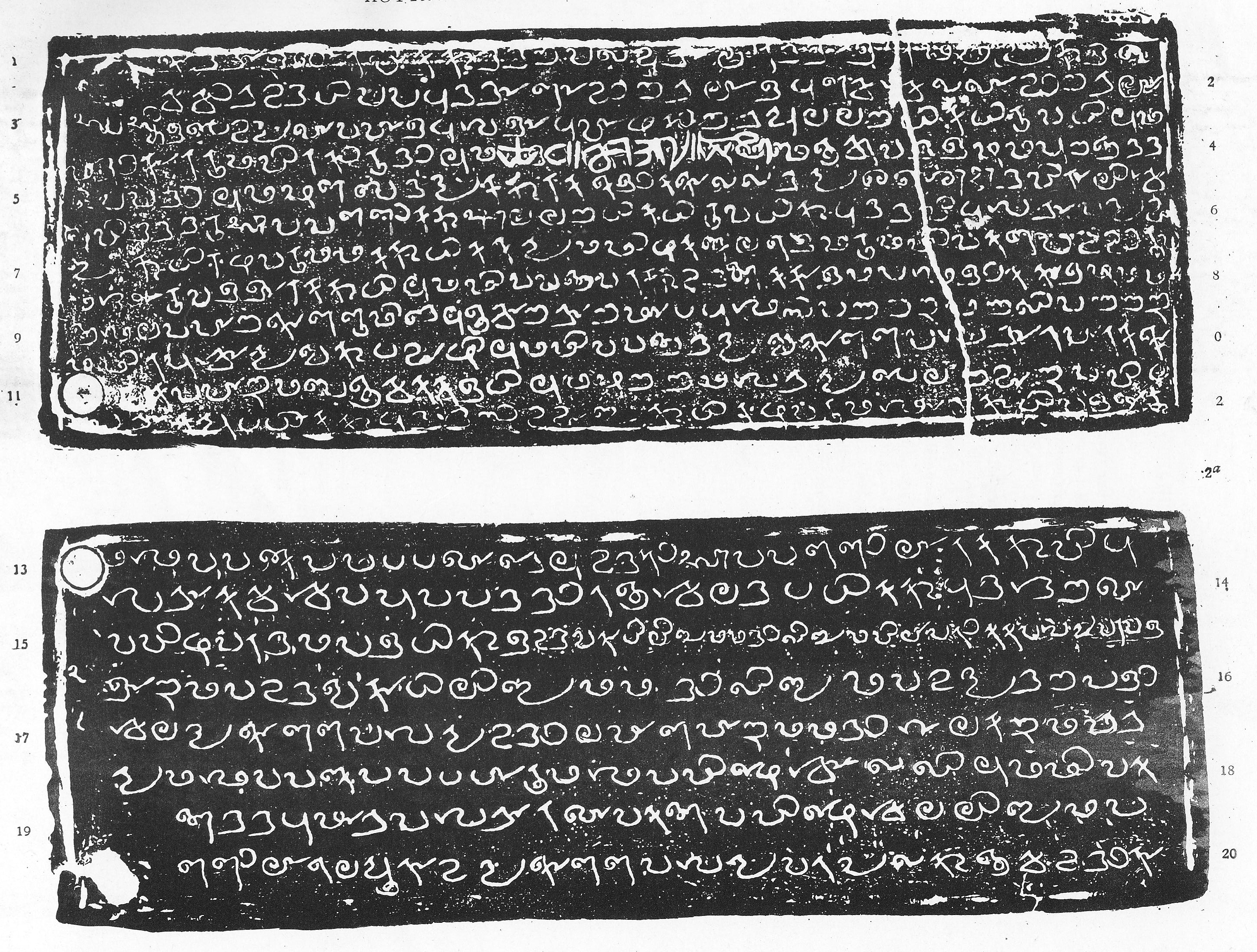
Tharisapalli plates of AD 849 written at Quilon

The Tharisappalli Copper Plates (849 AD) are a copper-plate grant issued by the King of Venadu (Quilon), Ayyanadikal Thiruvadikal, to the Syriac Christians or Nasranies on the Malabar Coast in the 5th regnal year of the Chera ruler Sthanu Ravi Varma. The inscription describes the gift of a plot of land to the Syrian Church at Thevally near Quilon (now known as Kollam), along with several rights and privileges to the Syrian Christians led by Marvan Sapir Iso.

The Tharisappalli copper plates are one of the important historical inscriptions of Kerala, the date of which has been accurately determined. The grant was made in the presence of important officers of the state and the representatives of trade corporations or merchant guilds. It also throws light on the system of taxation that prevailed in early Venadu, as several taxes such as a profession tax, sales tax and vehicle tax are mentioned. It also testifies to the enlightened policy of religious toleration followed by the rulers of ancient Kerala.

There are two sets of plates as part of this document, and both are incomplete. The first set documents the land while the second details the attached conditions. The signatories signed the document in the Hebrew, Pahlavi, and Kufic languages.

== Kollam as a part of Venad ==
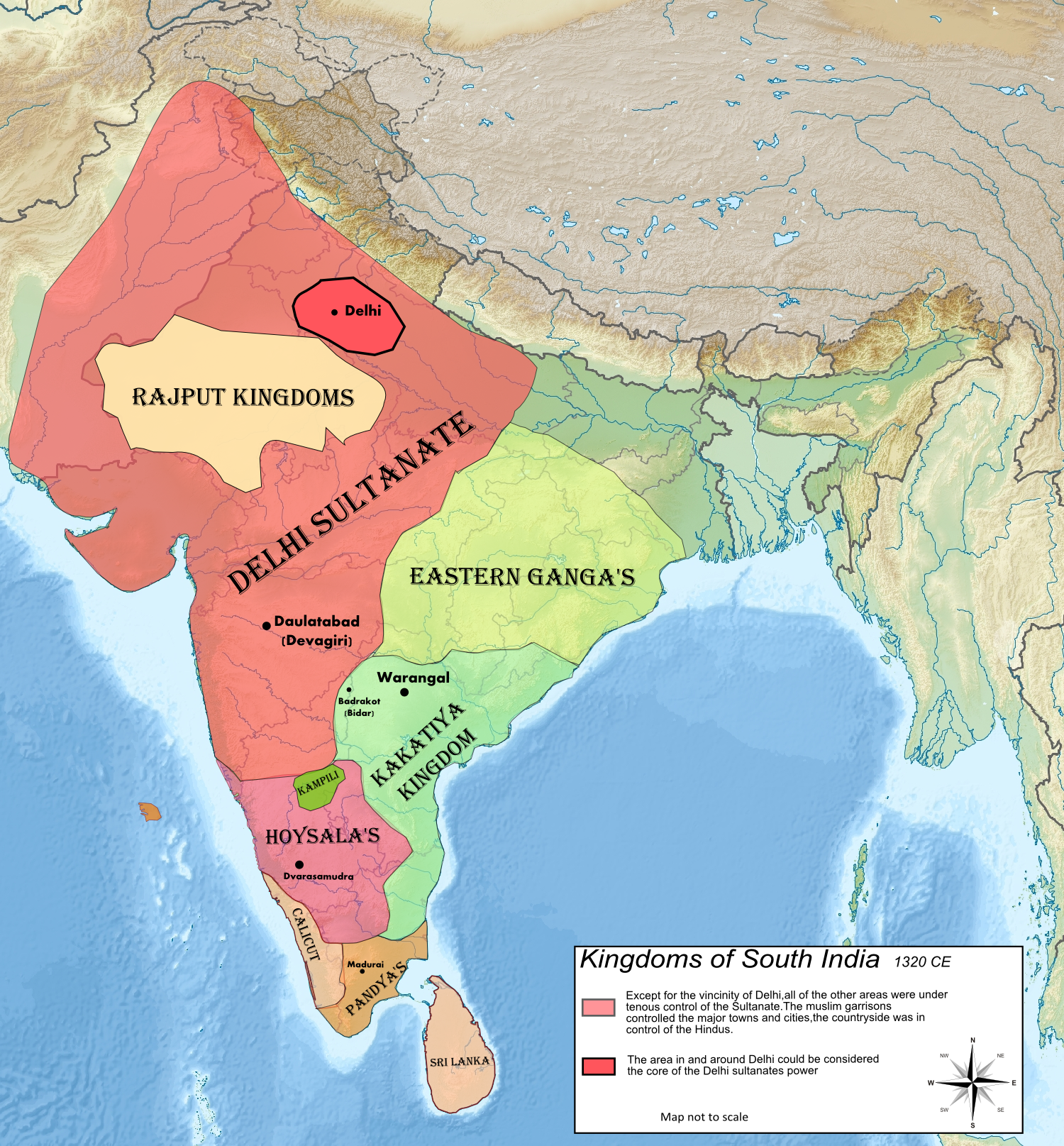
India in 1320 CE. The Kollam-Thiruvananthapuram-Kanyakumari area in the southernmost tip of Indian subcontinent, which was the main seat of Ay dynasty and later Venad dynasty, was under the influence of Chera dynasty

The Kingdom of Quilon or Venad was one of the three prominent late medieval Hindu feudal kingdoms on the Malabar Coast in South India. Venad ruled Kollam from the 9th century CE to the early 18th century, when it was transformed into the Kingdom of Travancore.

The rulers of Quilon, the Venattadikal Kulasekharas, traces their relations back to the Later Cheras. Sulaiman al-Tajir, a Persian merchant who visited Kerala during the reign of Sthanu Ravi Varma (9th century CE), records that there was extensive trade between Kerala and China at that time, based at the port of Kollam. The last Chera ruler, Rama Varma Kulashekhara, was the first ruler of an independent state of Quilon.

In the early 14th century, King Ravi Varma established a short-lived supremacy over South India. After his death, Quilon only included most of modern-day Kollam and Thiruvananthapuram districts of Kerala and Kanyakumari district of Tamil Nadu. Marco Polo claimed to have visited his capital at Quilon, a centre of commerce and trade with China and the Levant. Europeans were attracted to the region during the late fifteenth century, primarily in pursuit of the then rare commodity, black pepper. Quilon was the forerunner to Travancore.

In the Sangam age most of the present-day Kerala state was ruled by the Chera dynasty, Ezhimala rulers and the Ay rulers. Venad, ruled by the dynasty of the same name, was in the Ay kingdom. By the 9th century, Venad became a part of the Later Chera Kingdom. It became a semi-autonomous state within the Later Chera Kingdom. In the 11th century the region fell under the Chola Empire.

During the 12th century, the Venad dynasty merged the remnants of the old Ay dynasty to them forming the Chirava Mooppan (the ruling King) and the Thrippappur Mooppan (the Crown Prince). The provincial capital of the local patriarchal dynasty was at port Kollam. The port was visited by syriac Christians, Chinese and Arabs. In same century, the capital of the war-torn Later Chera Kingdom was relocated to Kollam and the Kulasekhara dynasty merged with the Venad rulers. The last King of the Kulasekhara dynasty based on Mahodayapuram, Rama Varma Kulashekhara, was the first ruler of an independent Venad. The Hindu kings of Vijayanagar Empire ruled Venad briefly in the 16th century.

=== The Portuguese Wars (1502–1661) ===
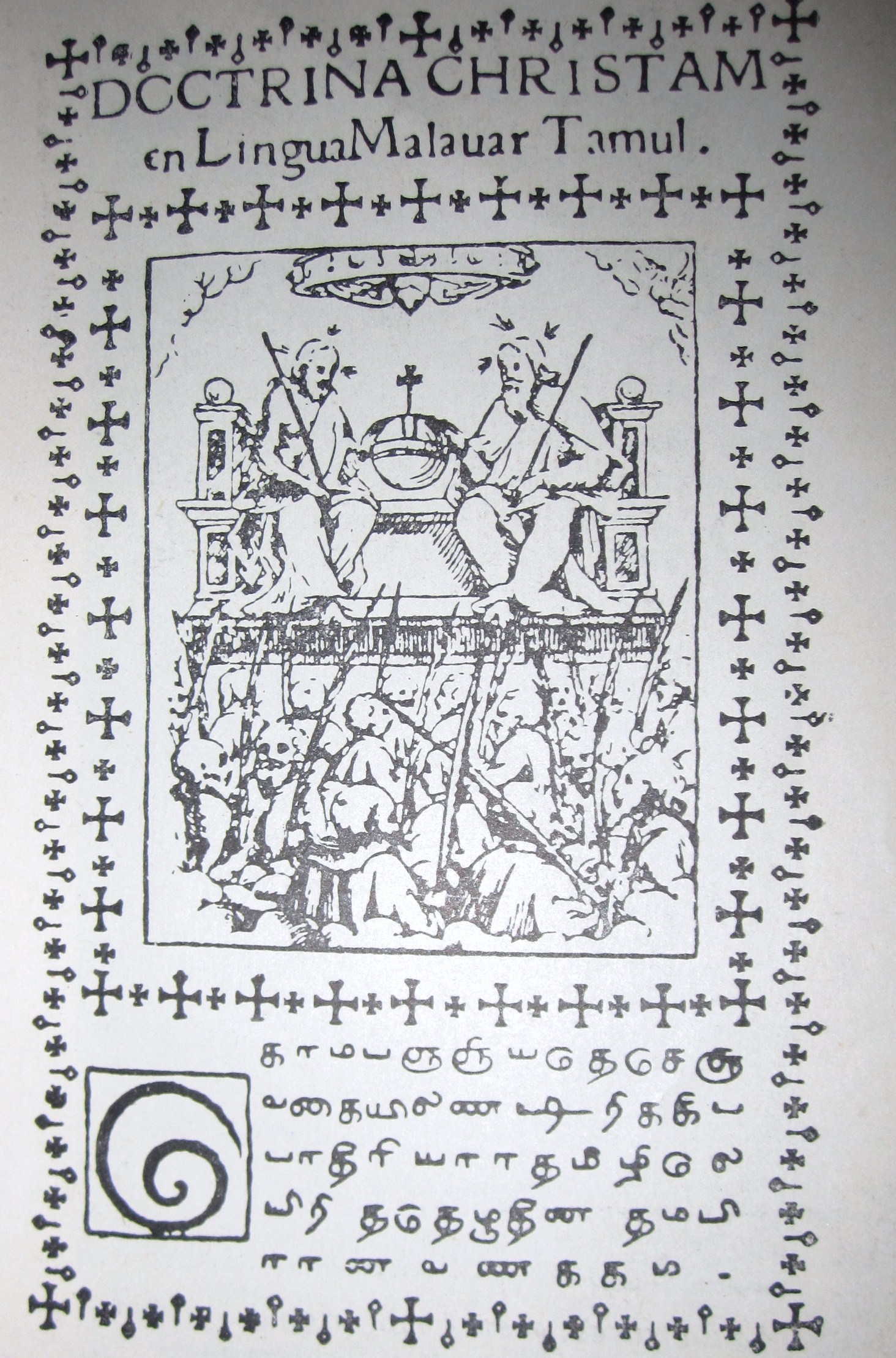
Thambiran Vanakkam was printed at Kollam, the capital of Venadu in 1578, during the Portuguese Era. It holds the record of the first book printed in any Indian language. It was written in the language Lingua Malabar Tamul, which was spoken in Southern Kerala (Kollam-Thiruvananthapuram area) during the medieval period.

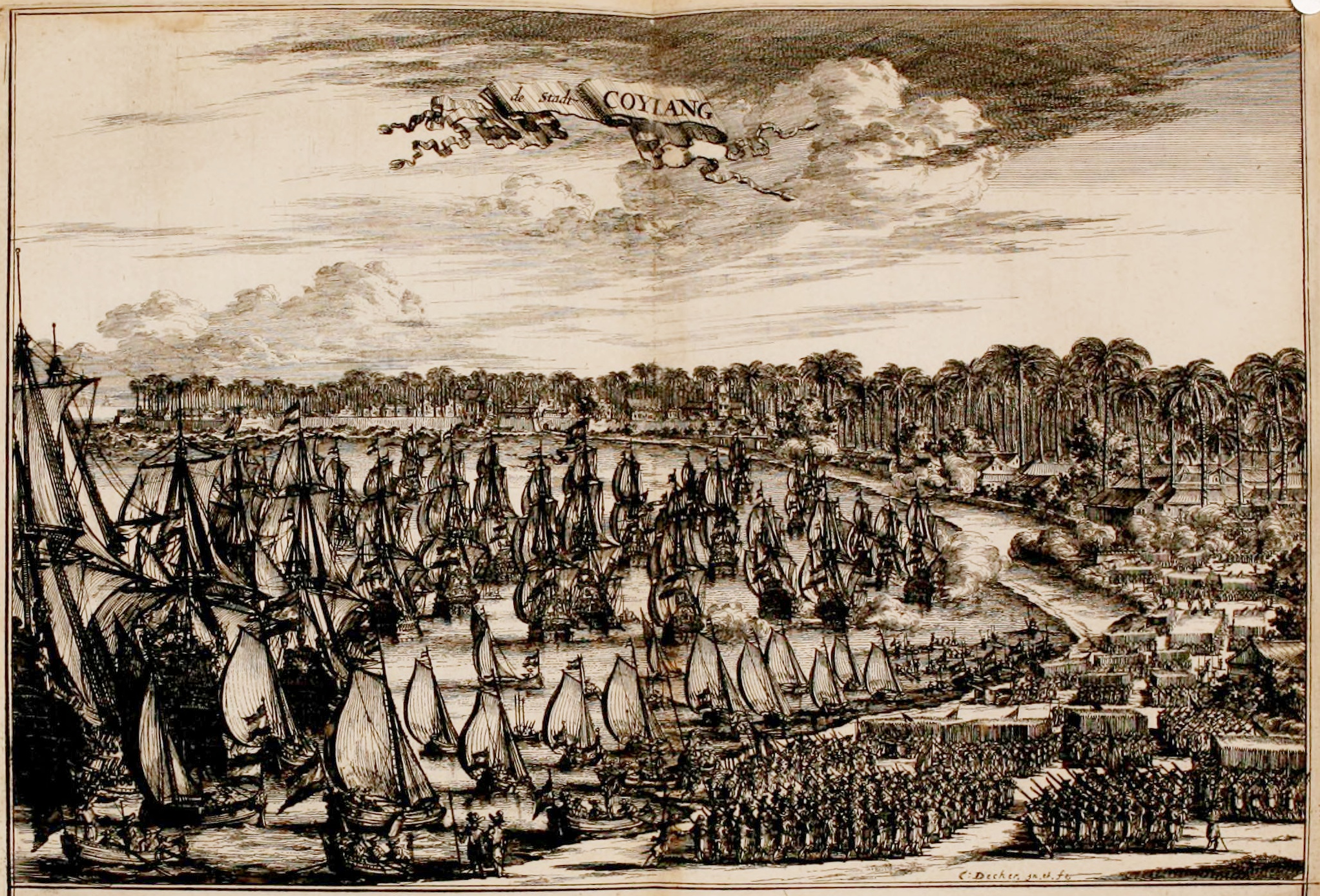
Kollam in AD. 1670

The Portuguese arrived at Kappad Kozhikode in 1498 during the Age of Discovery, thus opening a direct sea route from Europe to India. They were the first Europeans came to the city of Quilon. They came as traders and established a trading center at Tangasseri in Quilon during 1502. The then Queen of Quilon first invited the Portuguese to the city in 1501 for discussing about spices trade. But they refused that due to Vasco da Gama's close relations with the Raja of Cochin. Later the Queen negotiated with the Raja and he permitted to send two Portuguese ships to Quilon to buy fine quality pepper. In 1503, the Portuguese General Afonso de Albuquerque went to Quilon as per the Queen's request and collected required spices from there. It is believed that the colonial era in India started with the establishment of the Portuguese trading center at Quilon in 1502.

==== Portuguese Factory in Quilon ====
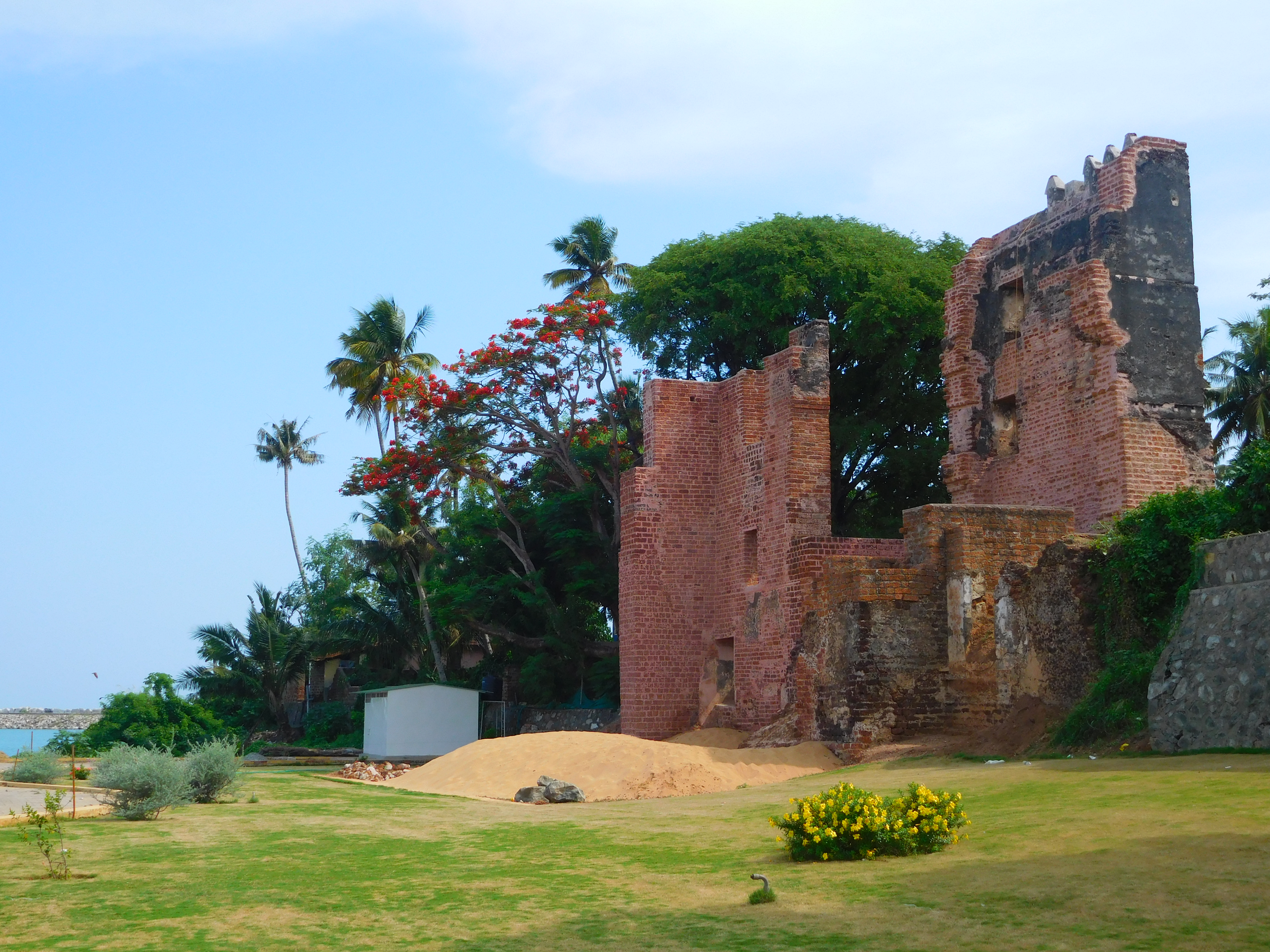
Fort St Thomas, Tangasseri

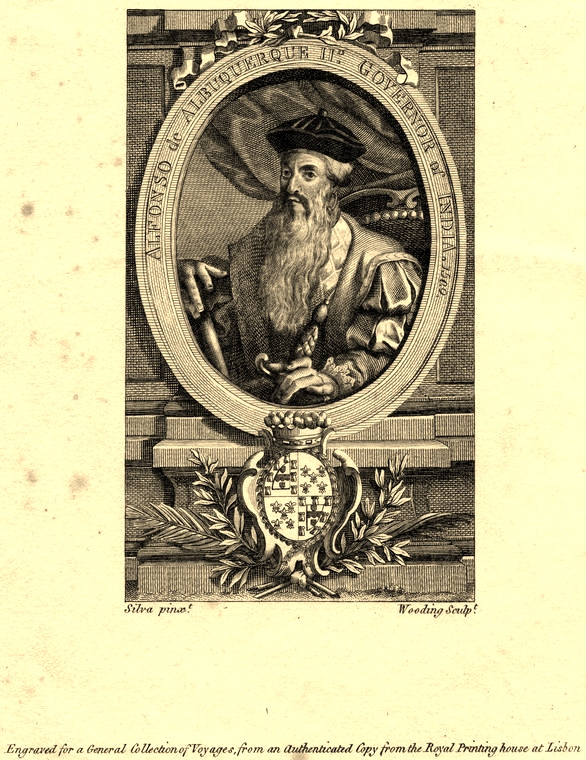
Afonso de Albuquerque as governor of India

The resumption of the pepper blockade seems to have put a crimp in Albuquerque's preparations of the return fleet, much of it having still lacked spice cargoes. Albuquerque dispatched two ships down to Quilon (Coulão, Kollam), with the factor António de Sá, to see if more could be procured there – Quilon having been better connected to Ceylon and points east, its spice supply was not as dependent on the Zamorin's sway and had often invited the Portuguese before. But soon after their departure, Albuquerque heard that the Zamorin of Calicut was preparing a Calicut fleet of some 30 ships for Quilon. Afonso de Albuquerque left Cochin and hurried down to Quilon himself.

Albuquerque arrived in Quilon, and instructed the Portuguese factor to hurry his business along, and sought out an audience with the queen of Quilon. They were still docked when the Calicut fleet arrived, carrying an embassy from the Zamorin with the mission to persuade (or intimidate) Quilon from abandoning the Portuguese. The queen of Quilon rejected the Zamorin's request, but also forbade Albuquerque from engaging in hostilities in the harbor. Albuquerque, realizing Quilon was the only spice supply he had access to, acceded to her request. Albuquerque resigned himself to negotiating a commercial treaty and establishing a permanent Portuguese factory in Quilon (the third in India), placing it under factor António de Sá, with two assistants and twenty armed men to protect the factory. That settled, Albuquerque returned to Cochin on 12 January 1504 to make final preparations for his departure. Albuquerque signed a treaty of friendship with the royal family of Quilon and established a factory there in 1503 itself. That voyage was the beginning of trade relations between Portugal and city of Quilon, which became the center of their trade in pepper.

==== End of Portuguese influence ====
The trade relation between Quilon and Portuguese got set back due to an insurrection happened at the Port of Quilon between the Arabs and the Portuguese. The captain of one of the Portuguese fleets saw an Arab ship is loading pepper from the port and that burst fighting between them. Aftermath, the battle started between them. 13 Portuguese men were killed including António de Sá and the St. Thomas church was burned down. To prevent further devastation, the Queen of Quilon signed a treaty with the Portuguese and as a result, they got customs tax exemption and monopoly over the spice and pepper tread with Quilon. The royal family of Quilon agreed to rebuild the destroyed church.

The Portuguese conquered Quilon until 1661. They fought with the Arab traders and captured a huge amount of gold after killing more than 2000 Arab traders. With the arrival of the Dutch and their peace treaty signing with Quilon, the Portuguese started losing their authority on Quilon and later, Quilon officially became a Dutch protectorate.

=== Dutch Protectorate (1661–1795) ===
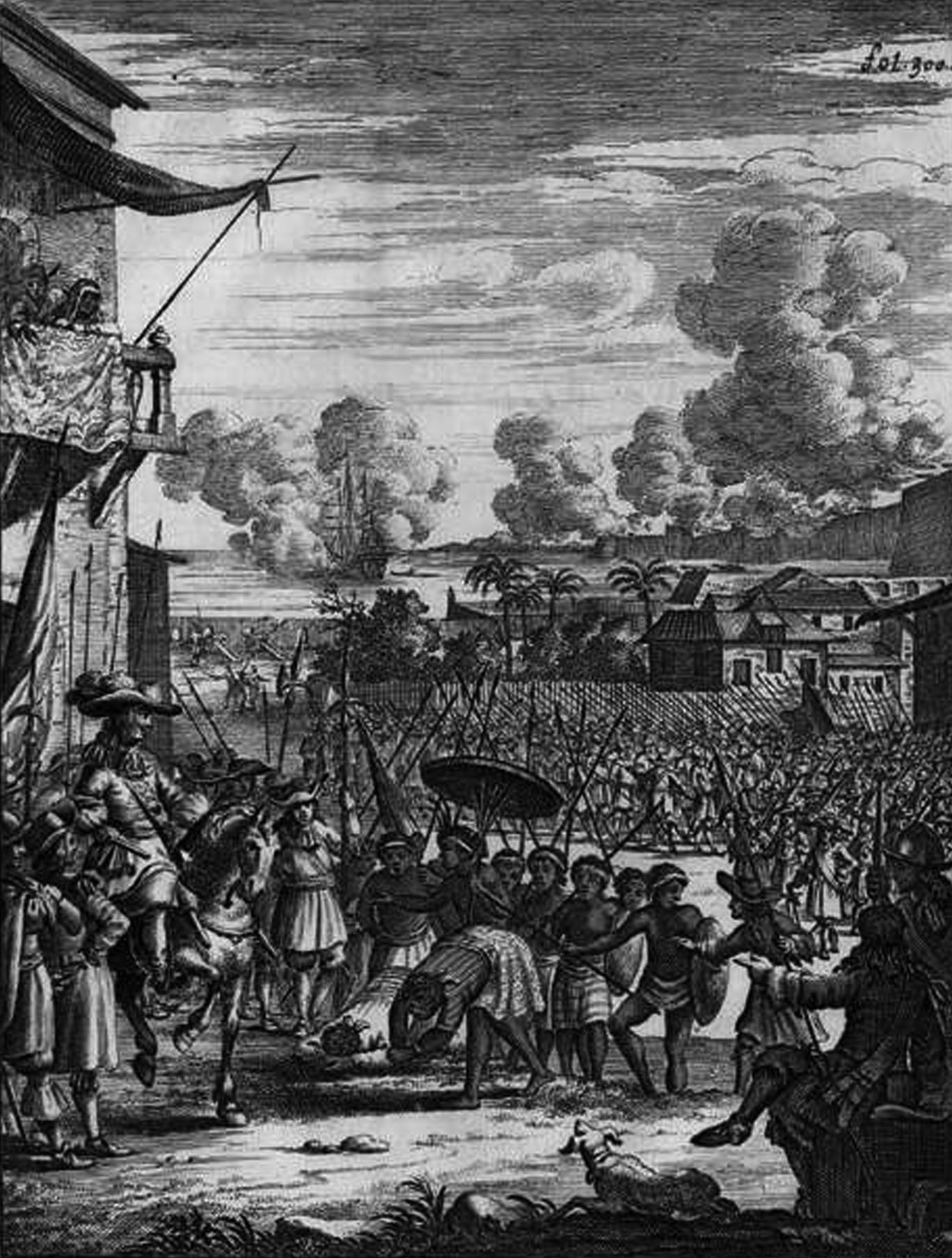
The rulers of Quilon submit to the Dutch

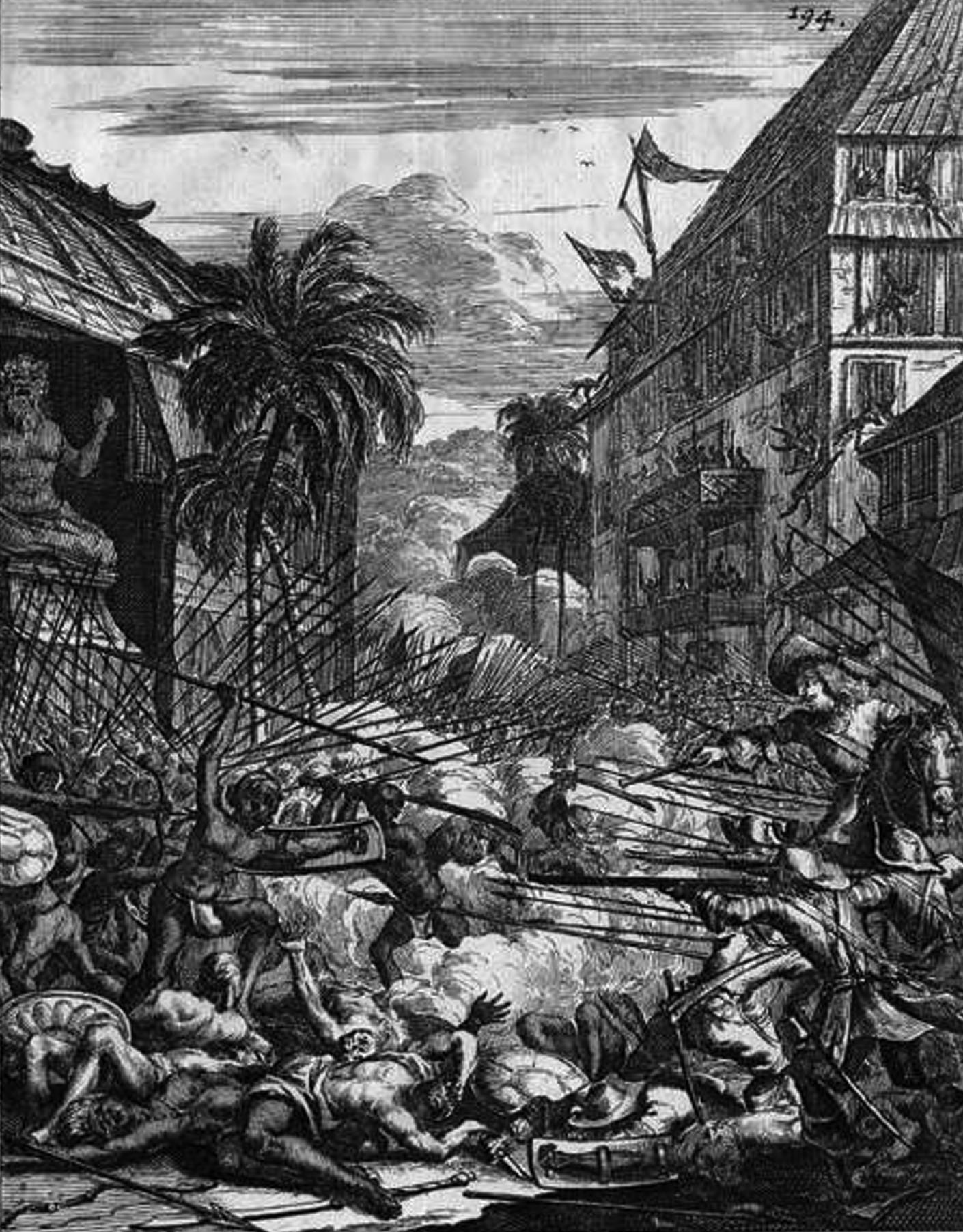
The royal palace and temple of the Quilon ruler conquered by the Dutch, Dec. 1661

The Dutch started expanding their empire to India in 1602 with the commencement of Dutch East India Company. They arrived Quilon in the year 1658 and signed a peace treaty in 1659. Thus Quilon became the official protectorate of the Dutch and their officer in-charge, Rijcklof van Goens, placed a military troop in the city to protect it from probable invasions from Portuguese and the British. The West Quilon region including Tangasseri named as 'Dutch Quilon' then. But English East India Company began to follow the Dutch Method of "Triangular Trade" in early 1600s itself. The English signed a trade treaty with Portuguese and gained right to trade across the Portuguese holdings in Asia.

Here is Johan Nieuhof's description of Kollam and Tangasseri at the time of the Dutch occupation:

The city is fortified with a stone wall of 18 to 20 feet high, and eight bastions; its suburbs, which are very large and stately, are by the Portuguese called Colang-China. For Koulang is separated into two bodies, one of which is called the upper or Malabar Koulang, the other the lower Koulang; in the first the king and queen kept their ordinary residences; the last was formerly in the possession of the Portuguese

The friars of St. Paul and the Franciscans had each a monastery, adorned with stately chapels and steeples. Besides which there were four other Portuguese churches here, dedicated to as many Romish Saints; they had no less than seven goodly churches, among which was the famous church built many years ago by the Christians of St. Thomas, which was left standing after we reduced the place into a narrow compass; in this church is the tomb of a certain great Portuguese captain, who was Governor of Koulang for 60 years. The houses of the inhabitants were stately and lofty, built of free stone.

The castle, the residence of the Portuguese Governor (Bishop's House) surmounted all the rest in magnificence; it lies very near the sea-side, at one end of the city, being covered on the top with coco leaves, as likewise two of its turrets, the third being tiled with pantiles.

Just upon the sea-shore is another four-square tower where I set up the Company's flag on top of a mast. In the midst of it, is a very loftily edifice, which the Portuguese used for a chapel, which I ordered to be...fitted for the use of the Company's officers...

This city as have been told before was drawn into a less compass by the Dutch which they fortified on the land-side with two half and one whole bastion. Most of the churches and other public edifices were pulled down, except the castle, St. Thomas Church and some monasteries, which remained standing in the said precinct.

== Travancore Rule ==
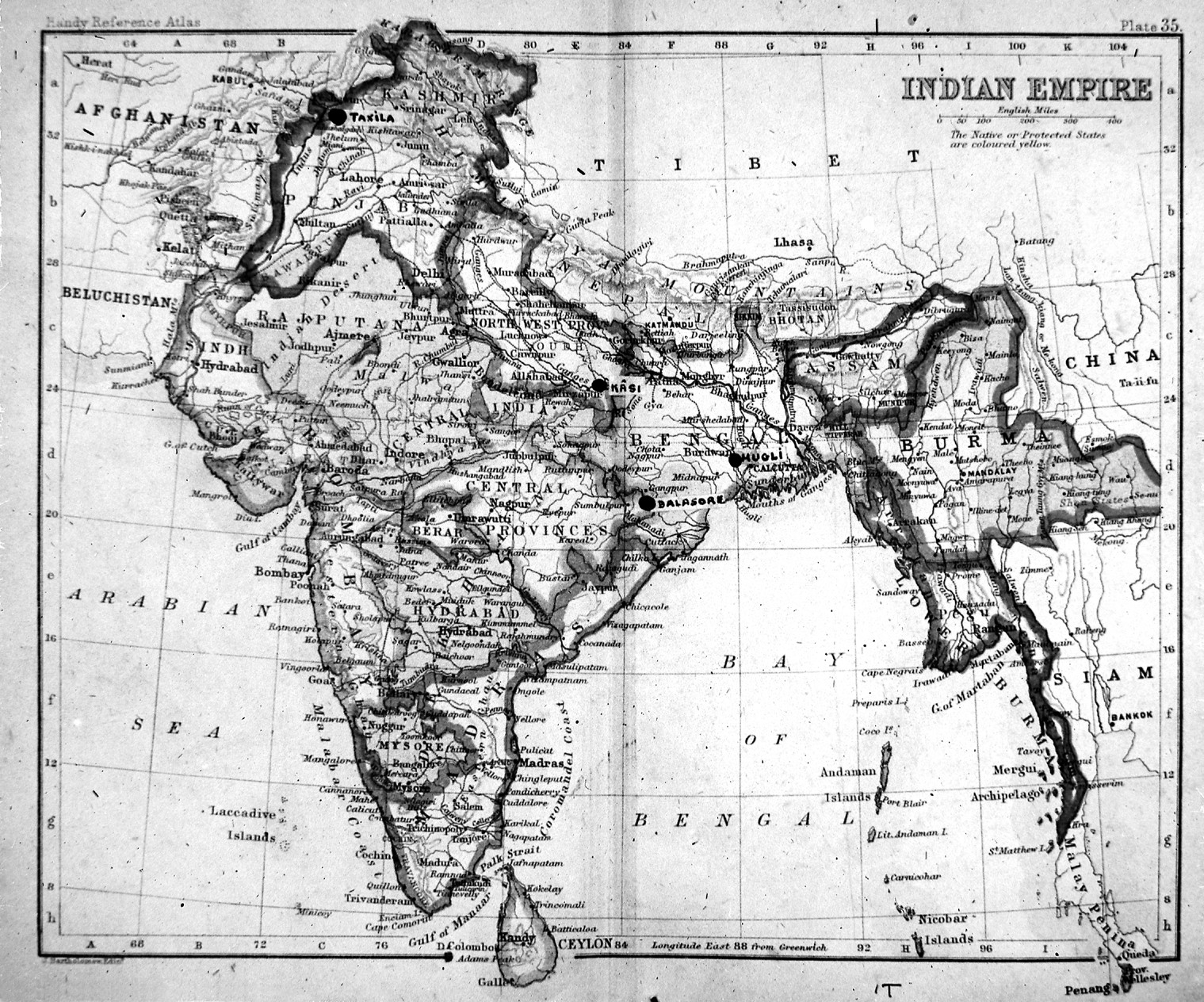
Kollam (marked as Quilon) on the Old map of India.

In the early 18th century CE, the Travancore royal family adopted some members from the royal family of Kolathunadu based at Kannur, and Parappanad based in present-day Malappuram district. Travancore became the most dominant state in Kerala by defeating the powerful Zamorin of Kozhikode in the battle of Purakkad in 1755. During the mid-eighteenth century, Travancore's Raja, Marthanda Varma, decided to consolidate various independent kingdoms including Quilon, Kayamkulam and Elayadath Swaroopam (Kottarakkara) with Kingdom of Travancore. The plan was dismissive because of the presence of the Dutch, who fortified their base city of Quilon against such invasions. The Dutch and allies have conquered Paravur and marched to Attingal and despatched another expedition to Kottarakkara as well. But ignoring the stiff resistance, the army of Marthanda Varma attacked and defeated the Dutch at Colachel in 1741 and marched to Quilon and attacked the city as part of the Travancore–Dutch War. After signing the Treaty of Mannar, several territories under royal family around Quilon were added to the Travancore Kingdom.

On October 17, 1795, Tangasseri was handed over to the British East India Company by the Dutch, following their defeat at Cochin. Major Petrie and Mr. Stevenson played key roles in the Dutch defeat. The Dutch territories were ultimately transferred to the British Government through the Paris Convention of 1841.

The takeover of Tangasseri at that time was relatively peaceful compared to its turbulent past. Its significance as a military outpost had diminished.

It remained under Travancore until 15 August 1947 when Indian Independence Act 1947 came into force in the region by virtue of Instrument of Accession signed between Governor-General of India and Maharaja in 1947.

=== British wars and Protectorate treaty ===
Later in 1795, British gained influence in Quilon through a Protectorate treaty with the Kingdom of Travancore. In 1811 John Munro established the British Residency at Kollam. In 1856, with 8 taluks under it, Central (Quilon) Division (Travancore) became one of the three administrative divisions of the princely state of Travancore. In 1904, Kollam–Sengottai Chord Line was constructed by the British as the first railway line in Travancore. The railway line connected the princely state with Madras Presidency. In 1920's British established an Air strip at Kollam named Quilon Aerodrome near the residency. It was the first aviation facility to be created in the region comprising Travancore, Kingdom of Cochin and Malabar District. In 1936 a town hall called Sri Moolam Thirunal Palace was established at Quilon.

== Post Independence and annexation by India ==
In the period between 15 August 1947 and 1 July 1949 Kollam remained in Travancore state of Dominion of India. On 1 July 1949, Quilon became one of the four districts in newly formed Travancore–Cochin state. On 1 November 1956 following the formation of State of Kerala through States Reorganisation Act, 1956 Quilon district comprising parts of present-day Pathanamthitta district became a part of Kerala. On 1 November 1982 few taluks and villages of Kollam were added to newly formed Pathanamthitta district.

== Names for Kollam ==
Kollam has been referred to by various names by travellers throughout history. Some of the historic names for Kollam include:

Number	Name	Description
1	Quilon	This is the anglicized version of the name Kollam, which originated from the word koyillam, which is a compound of kovilakam (meaning "Royal Palace") and illam. Quilon was the name used by the Portuguese, Dutch, and British during their colonial rule in the region.
2	Desinganadu	Kollam was a part of the ancient kingdom of Desinganadu. Desinganadu was known for its trade connections with foreign countries, and Kollam served as an important port city during that time. After the king Jayasimha from whom the Venadu dynasty is supposed to have originated.
3	Venadu	Kollam was also a prominent city in the kingdom of Venadu, which was one of the major feudal kingdoms in Kerala. The rulers of Venadu had their capital at Kollam for some time before it was shifted to the nearby city of Padmanabhapuram.
4	Kurakkeni Kollam	Seen in some inscriptions and plates
5	Elancon	Kollam has existed for many centuries and was called Elancon by early travellers
6	Kaulam Mali	Used by the Arabs Solyman (851) used as Kaulam Malay
7	Coilum	by the 13th-century Venetian traveler Marco Polo (Polo, Marco)
8	Male	Cosmas Indicopleustes used this terminology
9	Chulam	Jewish traveller Benjamin of Tudela (1166) referred to kollam as Chulam
10	Kiulan	Jean Pierre Guillaume Pauthier termed by this name while referring to some Chinese documents.
11	Coilon/Coilun	Mamluk-era geographer, historian Abulfeda (1273 C.E.)
12	Kulam	Italian merchant Marco Polo (1298 C.E.)
13	Polumbum	Odoric of Pordenone (1322), Italian late-medieval Franciscan friar and missionary explorer.
14	Colonbio	The Palatine MSS of Odoric (1322)
15	Columbum	Jordanus (1328), John of Marignolli (1348)
16	Colombo	Letters of Pope John XXII to the Christians of Quilon (1330)
17	Kaulam	Ibn Battuta (1343), explorer who travelled extensively in the lands of Afro-Eurasia, largely in the Muslim world.
18	Coloen	Niccolò de' Conti (1430), Italian merchant, explorer, and writer.
19	Colon	Ludovico di Varthema (1510), Italian traveller, diarist and aristocrat.
20	Coulam	Duarte Barbosa, Portuguese writer and officer from Portuguese India (between 1500 and 1516). (1516)
21	Colour	Sammario Ramusio
22	Colam	GD Empoli (1530)
23	Polomee/Polumbum	Used in the book Travels of Sir John Mandeville 1592.
24	Mahali	During the time of the Tang dynasty of China.
25	Tarsish	Seen in some plates and inscriptions.

== Bibliography ==
- Ring, Trudy (1994). International Dictionary of Historic Places: Asia and Oceania, Volume 5. United Kingdom: Taylor & Francis. ISBN 9781884964053.
- Chan, Hok-lam (1998). "The Chien-wen, Yung-lo, Hung-hsi, and Hsüan-te reigns, 1399–1435". The Cambridge History of China, Volume 7: The Ming Dynasty, 1368–1644, Part 1. Cambridge: Cambridge University Press. ISBN 9780521243322.
- Lin (2007). Zheng He's Voyages Down the Western Seas. Fujian Province: China Intercontinental Press. ISBN 9787508507071.
- Yule, Henry, ed. and trans. (1863). Mirabilia descripta: the wonders of the East. London: Hakuyt Society.
- Yule, Henry (1913). "Additional notes and corrections to the translation of the Mirabilia of Friar Jordanus". Cathay and the way thither: being a collection of medieval notices of China (Volume 3). London: Hakluyt Society. pp. 39–44.
- Henry Yule's Cathay, giving a version of the Epistles, with a commentary, &c. (Hakluyt Society, 1866) pp. 184–185, 192–196, 225–230
- Kurdian, H. (1937). "A correction to 'Mirabilia Descripta' (The Wonders of the East). By Friar Jordanus circa 1330". Journal of the Royal Asiatic Society. 69 (3): 480–481. doi:10.1017/S0035869X00086032. S2CID 163202845.
- F. Kunstmann, Die Mission in Meliapor und Tana und die Mission in Columbo in the Historisch-politische Blätter of Phillips and Görres, xxxvii. 2538, 135-152 (Munich, 1856), &c.
- Beazley, C.R. (1906). The Dawn of Modern Geography (Volume 3). Oxford: Clarendon Press. pp. 215–235.
- Ayyar, Ramanatha (1924). Travancore Archaeological Series: Vol 1 to 7. Trivandrum: Government Press. ISBN 8186365737.
- Menon, A. Sreedhara (1967). A Survey of Kerala History. Kottayam: DC Books. ISBN 8126415789.
- Pothan, S G (1963). The Syrian Christians of Kerala. Mumbai: Asia Publishing House.
- Cherian, P J. Perspectives on Kerala History.
- Thundy, Zacharias. The Kerala Story: Chera times of the Kulasekharas. Northern Michigan University.
- Nair, Sivasankaran K (2005). Venadinte Parinamam. Kottayam: D C Books.
- Gibb, H.A.R.; Beckingham, C.F., eds. (1994). The Travels of Ibn Baṭṭūṭa, A.D. 1325–1354 (Volume 4). London: Hakluyt Society. ISBN 978-0-904180-37-4.
