= Dutch War =

Dutch War may refer to:

- Dutch–Portuguese War, 1588–1661
- Any of the four Anglo-Dutch Wars:
  - First Anglo-Dutch War, 1652–54
  - Second Anglo-Dutch War, 1665–67
  - Third Anglo-Dutch War, 1672–74
  - Fourth Anglo-Dutch War, 1780–84
- Franco-Dutch War, 1672–78, of which the Third Anglo-Dutch War was a part
- Indonesian National Revolution
- Travancore–Dutch War, 1739–1741
