= Travancore–Dutch War =

1739–1753 war in India

Travancore-Dutch War
- Part of Colonization of India
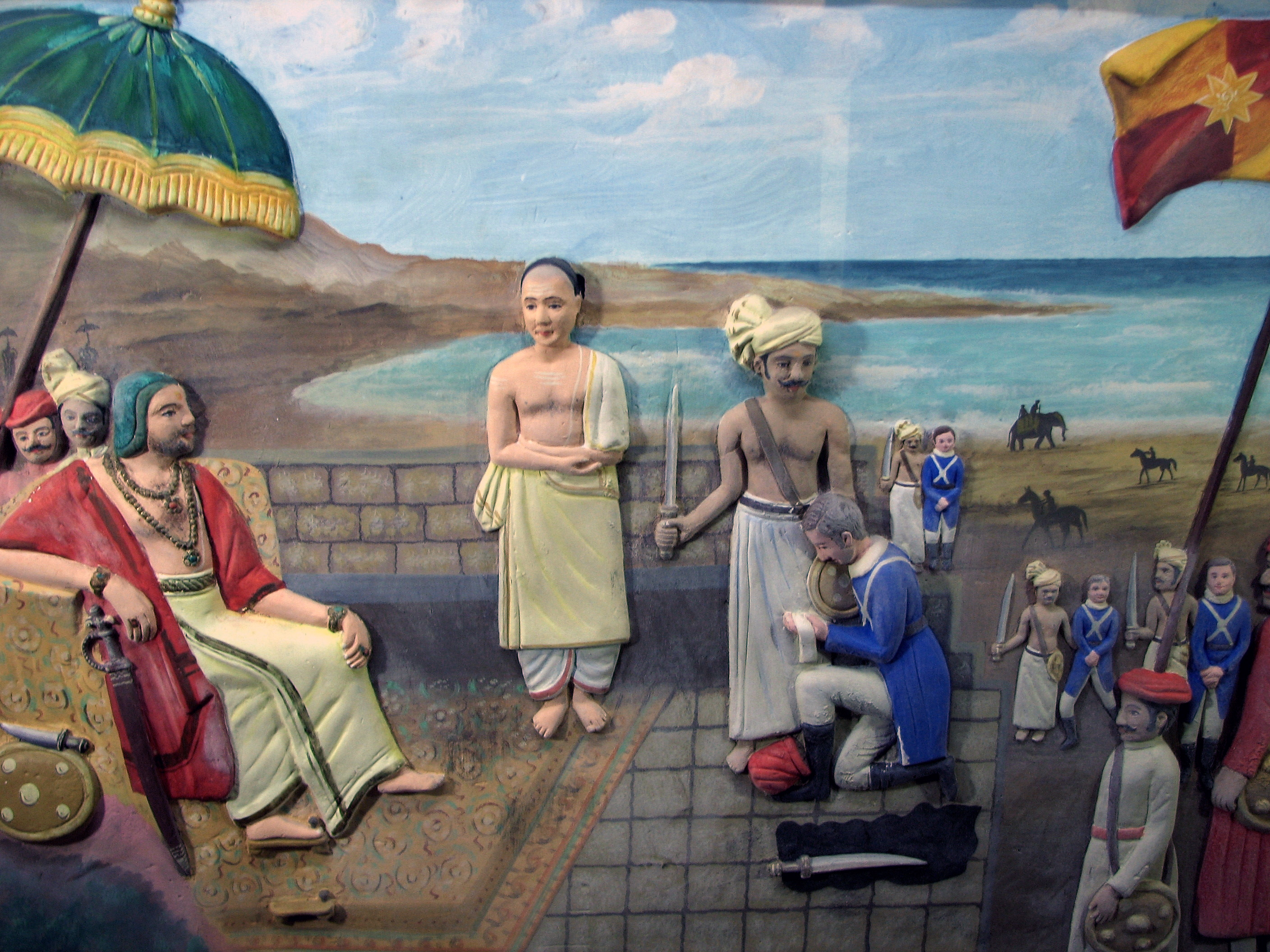
- Eustachius De Lannoy surrendering to Raja Marthanda Varma at the Battle of Colachel.
Date	12 November 1739 – 15 August 1753 (13 years, 9 months and 3 days)
Location	Kerala, in present day India
Result	Travancore victory

Belligerents
(Netherlands) Dutch Empire: Dutch East India Company; Kingdom of Cochin; Kingdom of Deshinganad (Kollam); Kingdom of Odanad (Kayamkulam); Kingdom of Thekkumkur; Kingdom of Vadakkumkur; Kingdom of Purakkad	Travancore

Commanders and leaders
Eustachius De Lannoy (POW); Donadi (POW); Duyvenschot (POW); Julius Valentyn Stein van Gollenesse; Reinicus Siersma	Marthanda Varma; Ramayyan Dalawa

The Travancore–Dutch War was a war between the Dutch East India Company (VOC) and the Indian kingdom of Travancore, culminating in the Battle of Colachel in 1741.

== Causes ==
In the early 18th century, the Malabar Coast region of present-day Kerala was divided among several small chiefdoms. In the 1730s, Marthanda Varma, the ruler of Travancore, adopted an expansionist policy, and conquered several territories from these small states. This threatened the interests of the Dutch East India Company's command at Malabar, whose spice trade depended on procurement of spices from these states. The ruler of Deshinganad (present-day Kollam) requested the Dutch support against an impending attack from Travancore, stating that he would surrender to Marthanda Varma if the Dutch refused to help him.

The Dutch had monopoly contracts with the states of Peritally (Perakattavali or present-day Nedumangad), Eledattu Svarupam (present-day Kottarakkara), and Maruthurkulangara. After Travancore captured these states during 1733-1734, their procurement from these areas stopped completely, and the Dutch trade in Malabar suffered greatly. In 1736, Julius Valentyn Stein van Gollenesse, the Dutch commander at Kochi (Cochin)) requested Marthanda Varma to honour the Dutch monopoly contract with Peritally that had been signed in 1688. He pointed out that the Dutch had declined to join the expelled ruler of Peritally against Travancore, even though the ruler had offered his whole land to the Dutch for such support. In August 1736, Marthanda Varma agreed to send his envoys to meet the Dutch representatives, but refused to do so after these representatives reached the meeting place. Travancore continued to supply the black pepper from Peritally to other foreign traders. In September 1736, van Gollenesse requested the queen of Maruthurkulangara to honour her monopoly contract with the Dutch, but the queen refused to do so now that her state was under Travancore's suzerainty.

In January 1739, Gustaaf Willem van Imhoff, the Dutch Governor of Ceylon, visited Kochi to study the affairs of the Dutch command in Malabar on behalf of the Dutch East India Company's supreme government at Batavia. In his July 1739 report, van Imhoff noted that Marthanda Varma favoured the Company's competitors, and that his increasing power threatened the Dutch trade interests in the region. In another report, van Imhoff rejected a plan to pay market price for procurement of pepper, calling it unprofitable, and instead favoured military action to force the coastal rulers to fulfill their contract obligations. In a December 1739 report, van Imhoff wrote that the Dutch business in the region was in "complete ruin", and would have to be saved through "violent redress".

In 1739, the Dutch organised an alliance of the rulers of Kochi, Thekkumkur, Vadakkumkur, Purakkad, Kollam, and Kayamkulam. Meanwhile, the princess of Eledattu Svarupam escaped from imprisonment at Travancore, and reached Thekkumkur. Van Imhoff personally met Marthanda Varma, urging him to reinstate the princess, but Marthanda Varma refused the demand. Van Imhoff threatened to invade Travancore, but Marthanda Varma dismissed the threat, and replied that he had been thinking about invading Europe some day.

== Initial Dutch successes ==
After the failure of negotiations with Marthanda Varma, the Dutch command at Malabar decided to declare war on Travancore, without obtaining permission or waiting for reinforcements from Batavia. The Dutch deployed a detachment of soldiers from Ceylon against Travancore, under the command of Captain Johannes Hackert. They asked Marthanda Varma to vacate the lands annexed by Travancore, which the king refused to do. On 12 November 1739, a joint force of the Dutch and their allies attacked the Travancore army stationed near Kollam. The Dutch allies included Deshinganad, Kayamkulam, and Cochin. In the ensuing battle, a hand grenade exploded the gun powder depot of the Travancore army, which fled from the site, pursued by the attackers until Tangasseri (Quilon de Sima). At Tangasseri, which had been deserted, the Dutch captured 16 cannons, before marching to Paravur. The British East India Company (EIC) factor at Anchuthengu congratulated the Dutch on their victory and requested them to leave the EIC factory at Edava in peace.

By early December 1739, the Dutch and their allies marched towards Attingal and Varkala. The Travancore forces set up a stockade guarded by 5,000 Nair soldiers to guard Varkala. Meanwhile, the armies of Kollam and Kayamkulam also marched against the defenders. When the Travancore army withdrew to check an invasion by Chanda Sahib of Arcot in the south, the allies occupied Eledattu Svarupam, and reinstated the princess. Next, the allies attacked Attingal, but the Travancore army forced them to retreat. The Dutch decided to wait for reinforcements from Ceylon before waging further war against Travancore. As a result, the allies withdrew to Ayiroor, plundering and burning the territory on their way back.

Subsequently, the Nair army of Kollam forced the Travancore army to retreat from Navaikulam (30 December 1739) and Attingal (25 January 1740). On 20 February 1740, the Dutch and their allies defeated the Travancore army at the Attingal ferry, but took heavy losses; Kollam suffered the loss of half of their army, which, along with the forces of Kayamkulam, fled from the battlefield. Travancore had received the temporary aid of 150 soldiers, as well as guns and ammunition from the EIC factor at Anchuthengu, until the allied forces retreated. In the crisis after the battle, the Dutch pressured the distraught ruler of Kollam into assembling a new army of 10,000 Nair soldiers so that Travancore could not take advantage of the situation. Meanwhile, Marthanda Varma suffered reverses against Chanda Sahib at Thovalai. The Dutch hoped to press their advantage by attacking Attingal, but they were unable to receive reinforcements from Batavia because of the riots there.

== Travancore's victory at Colachel ==
In November 1740, the Dutch command in Malabar received two small reinforcements of 105 and 70 soldiers from Ceylon, and launched a second campaign against Travancore, resulting in the battle of Colachel.

Marthanda Varma then captured the Dutch forts in the vicinity. A Dutch force under the command of De Lennoy landed at Colachel from Cochin and captured the country up to Kottar. Marthanda Varma marched south and prevented the capture of Kalkulam by the Dutch. When the Dutch retreated to their base in Colachel, Marthanda Varma pursued them and caught up with them on 10 August 1741. In the battle of Colachel Marthanda Varma won a decisive victory over the Dutch and captured 24 officers including the commander De Lennoy. A pillar that celebrates the victory and gives details about the war still stands near the coast of Colachel. There are folk tales among the local Mukkuvar people about this war. The tale says among other things that the local Mukkuvar fishermen were asked to keep their catamaran oars in vertical position on the beach sand, with an inverted pot on top of it along the beach side, so that it looked like a long line of infantry with helmets stood along the beach in multiple rows. The fishermen also kept their oars on their shoulders so that they would appear like soldiers standing with their rifles. They were also instructed to make mock cannons using coconut trees as a diversion. The local fishermen co-operated extensively with the Travancori royal guards and captured the ship during this war.

== Post-Colachel conflicts ==
Subsequently, the Dutch and Travancore agreed to a ceasefire, but the hostilities resumed after the two sides failed to reach an agreement. After being reinforced with a cavalry contingent from Tirunelveli, Marthanda Varma besieged the Kilimanoor fort held by the Dutch. While the siege was going on, the rulers of Kollam and Kayamkulam left the Dutch alliance, and concluded a secret agreement with Travancore. On 10 April 1742, the dejected Dutch then left the fort in haste, leaving behind their ammunition and provisions. The Dutch force, led by Captain Daniel Bergen and Jacob Hinderman retreated to Ayiroor, but was surrounded and attacked by the Travancore forces. The Dutch contingent was rescued by the ships sent by the Malabar command.

Meanwhile, the queen of the Eledattu Svarupam kingdom, who had been restored to the throne by the Dutch after being dethroned by Marthanda Varma, had become unpopular as a ruler. Her indifference to the administrative affairs had led to decay of the kingdom, and the Madampis and the Pillais were dissatisfied with her rule. The Dutch commissioners had proposed appointing a Kariyakkar (administrator) to govern the kingdom alongside the queen, but did not have resources to spare for the kingdom's defence. Taking advantage of this situation, Marthanda Varma invaded the kingdom's capital Kottarakkara, and conquered it, facing little resistance. The queen fled to the Kingdom of Cochin, and started living with her relatives at Karapuram, receiving a daily allowance of 45 fanams from the Dutch.

In a 17 April 1742 letter to Batavia, the Dutch commander van Gollenesse requested 2,000 soldiers from the Company's Supreme Government, stating that the Dutch were in a dire situation in Malabar. Van Gollenesse mentioned that the Europeans were deserting the Dutch forces, and the local allies were breaking away from the Dutch command in Malabar: the ruler of Purakkad had announced intentions to break his alliance with the Dutch, and the king of Tekkumkur as well as two princes of Cochin had disobeyed their orders.

Meanwhile, Marthanda Varma planned an attack on Kochi (Cochin). However, Duyvenshot, the former Dutch officer who had accepted his employment, advised him to conquer Kollam before besieging Kochi. While Duyvenshot had told Marthanda Varma that the Travancore forces would be able to capture Kollam, van Gollenesse believed that the fortifications at Kollam would be able to withstand a siege. The ruler of Kollam and Kayamkulam sought the Dutch support against Travancore: van Gollenesse refused to oblige, citing scarcity of soldiers and weapons. In June 1742, the Travancore army attacked Kollam, which was defended by Nair soldiers led by Achyuta Wariar. During the siege, the Dutch provided counsel, rice and ammunition to the ruler of Kollam. Marthanda Varma made several unsuccessful attempts to capture Kollam, Marthanda and ultimately withdrew after losing 6,000 soldiers in the conflict.

== Attempts at peace ==
After Travancore's failure to capture Kollam, van Gollenesse again sought 2,000 soldiers from Batavia, mentioning that the number of soldiers required would rise to 5,000 if the ruler Kozhikode (the Zamorin of Calicut) joined the war.

By 1742, the Dutch command in Malabar had spent enormous amount of money for defending their allies against Travancore's aggression, but had not gained much from this investment. The lack of funds and support from Ceylon and Batavia prompted the Dutch to resume negotiations with Travancore. Marthanda Varma, who had not responded positively to the Dutch attempts at negotiations in the past, agreed to a peace treaty this time.

On 17 February 1742, Marthanda Varma offered peace to the Dutch on the following terms:

- Travancore would return all prisoners of war from Colachel, except those who had taken service with Marthanda Varma
- Travancore would return all the Dutch arms and ammunition that escaped the destructive fire at Colachel
- The Dutch would return all of Travancore's arms and ammunition captured at Kollam, Karthikapally, Colachel, and Thengapatanam
- Both parties would give up claims on any other losses suffered during the war
- Travancore would retain the parts of Kollam conquered in July 1739, Kottarakkara, Kunnattur, Majnore, Maruthurkulangara, and Karthikapally.
- The Dutch would be allowed to continue their pepper trade in these areas as usual.
- Travancore would recognize the Dutch claim on Attingal when the Dutch would present their agreement with its ruler
- Travancore would sell 1000 candies of pepper to the Dutch, and would be free to sell 200 candies to anyone
- The Dutch would be allowed to build a fort at Colachel, and in return, would help Travancore against the French if needed
- Travancore would comply with the contracts signed by the Dutch with the vassal states of Travancore, if the Dutch could produce the signed documents
- The disputes between the rulers of Travancore and Kollam would be settled by two impartial princes

The Dutch rejected these terms, and presented their own terms, which were rejected by Marthanda Varma. The Dutch commander van Gollenesse believed that Marthanda Varma would soften his bargaining position if defeated in a battle.

In July 1742, the Dutch factors in India received the news that van Imhoff would be arriving in India with a large force. However, van Imhoff's forces did not actually arrive in India. In August 1742, he sought arms and soldiers from the Dutch East India Company's Supreme Government at Batavia, stating that if this support was not provided, he would have to sign a peace treaty with Travancore on terms unfavourable to the Company.

Meanwhile, Marthanda Varma had received news about the alleged impending arrival of van Imhoff's forces, and therefore, he retreated to his core territory, and started peace negotiations with the Dutch. He contacted the rulers of Cochin and Tekkumkur, asking them to mediate the Dutch and Travancore. Meanwhile, the Company's Supreme Government ordered the Dutch Command at Malabar to negotiate peace with the Travancore instead of military action. Therefore, the Dutch also requested the kings of Cochin and Tekkumkur to initiate negotiations with Travancore. However, these rulers believed that the peace between the Dutch and Travancore would be detrimental to their interests, and were unwilling to work towards such a peace negotiation. Therefore, the Dutch opened direct negotiations with Travancore, and Mavelikkara was chosen as the venue for the meeting.

Marthanda Varma sent his envoy Krishna Annavy to Mavelikkara, while the Dutch were represented by Ezckiel Rahabi and Silvester Mendes, the captain of the Topasses.

Meanwhile, because van Imhoff's forces did not arrive, the Dutch were unable to provide Kollam with reinforcements. Therefore, the ruler of Kollam and Kayamkulam agreed to become a tributary of Marthanda Varma, and signed a treaty to this effect in September 1742, at Mannar. The ruler ceded much of his territory to Marthanda Varma, and agreed to pay him an annual tribute of an elephant and 1,000 rupees.

The negotiations at Mavelikkara progressed well, and on 6 January 1743, the EIC factor at Anchuthengu expressed hope that peace would be established between the Dutch and Travancore. However, by this time, Marthanda Varma learned that van Imhoff had not yet departed from Europe. He dragged on negotiations until he became certain that van Imhoff's arrival in Kerala had been postponed. He then assumed a tough bargaining position, and refused to approve that his representatives had agreed to at Mavelikkara. When the Dutch protested, he expressed regret, and requested renewal of negotiations at Paravur, Kollam.At Paravur, both the parties assumed tough bargaining positions, and on 18 February 1743, Silvester Mendes informed van Gollenesse that Marthanda Varma's representatives kept backing away from terms previously agreed to.

On 27 February 1743, the ruler of Kollam and Kayamkulam, who was unhappy with the terms of his treaty with Travancore, met van Gollenesse on board the ship Popkensburg, seeking Dutch support against Travancore. However, van Gollenesse wanted to continue the negotiations with Travancore, and refused to provide such support, advising the ruler against going to war with Travancore.

On 3 March 1743, Mendes informed van Gollenesse that Marthanda Varma had presented the following terms for a peace treaty:

- Travancore would not hand over any deserters from Colachel, nor return any materials (including ammunition and cash) captured from the Company, since Travancore had suffered damage worth 400,000 rixdollars in the war.
- Any previous contracts signed by the Dutch for pepper trade would be canceled, and the Dutch would be now required to pay Travancore 54 rupees for each candy of pepper
- The Dutch would pay duties on their merchandise in the kingdom of Travancore
- The Dutch would aid Travancore with arms and ammunitions in times of war
- If the French attacked Travancore, the Dutch would fight them
- The Dutch would support Travancore in driving the Nawab of Carnatic from Travancore
- The Dutch would maintain neutrality in Travancore's wars with other states

These terms were unacceptable to van Gollenesse, who broke off the negotiations. The Travancore representatives then asked him to specify his objections, and in response, van Gollenesse presented his proposed draft of the treaty. Marthanda Varma replied that he was ready to settle the differences, and requested renewal of negotiations at Pulikkara. Accordingly, van Gollenesse sent his envoys Silvester Mendes and Isaac Isackzs (the captain of the Lascorins) for the discussions, but these envoys found Marthanda Varma's proposals vague and ambiguous. On 6 April 1743, van Gollenesse received a message from Marthanda Varma confirming the failure of negotiations at Pulikkara.

In May 1743, van Gollenesse stepped down from the Dutch command in Malabar, in order to take up charge as the Governor of Dutch Ceylon. His replacement Reinicus Siersma realized that the local chiefs of Kerala no longer feared the Dutch, and a failure to reach an agreement with Travancore would severely affect the Company's pepper trade in Malabar. On 22 May 1743, Siersma concluded a peace treaty with Travancore, accepting most of the terms proposed by Marthanda Varma.

== Later developments ==
In 1742, the Raja of Odanad sued for peace with Travancore and signed the Treaty of Mannar. However, to extricate himself from the situation, the king of Odanad allied himself with Vadakkumkur, Thekkumkkur and Purakkad and violated the treaty obligations. The Travancore army occupied Kayamkulam in 1746 and the alliance of the Kayamkulam Raja gave Marthanda Varma a casus belli against the allies. The Ambalapuzha army led by Mathur Panikkar and Tekkedathu Bhattatiri defected to the Travancore army, and Marthanda Varma captured the state. In 1749 and 1750, Thekkumkur and Vadakkumkur were annexed.

Following these developments, the Dutch signed the Treaty of Mavelikkara in 1753 with Marthanda Varma, whereby they undertook a strict policy of non-intervention and repudiated their alliances with other Kerala powers.

In 1753, the northern parts of the newly created state of Travancore rebelled under the influences of the exiled rajas of Ambalapuzha, Thekkumkur and Vadakkumkur. The rebels were aided by the Maharaja of Cochin and the Dutch, and their army was commanded by Palliyil Idikkela Menon, a courtier of the Maharaja of Cochin. Towards the end of 1753, the Cochin army occupied Purakkad. On 3 January 1754, the rebels, backed by the armies of Cochin and the Dutch, met the Travancore forces led by prince Rama Varma, Ramayyan Dalawa and De Lennoy in the battle of Anadeswaram. Even though the battle was tactically a stalemate, it was a strategic victory for Travancore, since the allies were forced to withdraw to Ambalapuzha. In the battle of Ambalapuzha, the allies were decisively defeated and a large number of Cochin nobility were killed or captured. The allied commander Idikkela Menon was captured and executed. The Travancore forces captured all of the Cochin territories up to Arukutti, Udayamperur in the south and Mamala in the east. The Cochin Raja sued for peace and in 1757, under the auspices of the Dutch and the Prime Minister of Cochin, Paliath Komi Achan a peace treaty was signed.

The Travancore-Dutch relations improved after the Dutch sold the Cranganore and Pallipuram forts to Travancore, which were incorporated into the Travancore lines (Nedumkotta).

== See also ==
- Mysorean invasion of Kerala
- Travancore War, between Travancore and the British East India Company
