= Battle of Purakkad =

1746 battle between Travancore and Odanad

Date	1746; 280 years ago
Location	Purakkad, Kerala, India

The first Battle of Purakkad was fought in 1746 between the Indian Kingdom of Travancore and combined forces of the feudal state Odanad.

== Background ==
With the defeat of the Kulachal battle in 1741, the Dutch captured Vamanapuram with the help of the King of Kollam. Following this, the Travancore army led by Ramayan Dalava besieged the Kollam fort of the Dutch. But the Odanad (Kayamkulam) army helped the Dutch army for the defense of this fort. The Kayamkulam army was led by Achyutawaryar who was the minister of the King of Kayamkulam. Following this, the Travancore army retreated. In 1742, the combined forces of the Dutch and Kayamkulam captured Kilimanoor. For this reason Marthandavarma brought cavalry from Tirunelveli and led the army towards Kilimanoor and captured Kilimanoor. Then Marthandavarma's army moved towards Kayamkulam. The King of Kayamkulam resisted at first but finally begged for peace. Following this, Marthanda Varma and King of Kayamkulam signed the Treaty of Mannar. But the King of Kayamkulam later violated the terms of this truce. This led to the Travancore army conquering the Kayamkulam in 1746. This battle came to be known as the Battle of Purakkad. Marthandavarma captured the small feudal state Odanad and annexed it to Travancore for helping Kayamkulam in the war with Travancore. Present Ambalapuzha and Kuttanad taluks were included in this.

== See also ==
- Battle of Colachel
- Odanad
