= Olakettiambalam =

- Interactive map of Olakettiambalam
- Coordinates: 9.200520°N 76.52537°E
- Country: India
- State: Kerala
- District: Alappuzha
- Time zone: UTC+5:25 (IST)

Olakettiambalam is a small village situated in the southern part of Alappuzha district, six kilometers south of Mavelikkara and six kilometers from Kayamkulam at latitude 9.27426 north and longitude 76.5061 east. It is famous for temples and it was named after that. This place belongs to Onattukara.

== Demography ==
In the 2006 census, Olakettiambalam had a population of 1770, of which male constitutes 48% and female constitutes 52%. Olakettiambalam has a literacy of 94%.

== Politics ==
Olakettiambalam is a part of Mavelikara (Lok sabha constituency).

=== Temples ===
- Koipallikarazhma Devi temple
- Vathikulangara Devi temple
- Eduvadikavu Devi temple
- Cheruvalli Bagavathi temple
- Chettikulangara Devi Temple
- Kulathazhathu Murthi temple

=== Churches ===
- St. Paul's Marthoma Church, Vathikulam, Olakettiambalam
- St. Mary's Orthodox Church, Olaketty
- St. Thomas' Marthoma Church, Pallickal
- St. Gregorius Orthodox Church, Mullikulangara
- Assemblies of God Churches in Olaketti, Vathikulam, and Olakettiambalam

== Schools ==
- St John's L.P.S., Vathikulam
- Thekkekara govt. UP School, Koipallikarazhma
- Holy Trinity Central Senior Secondary School
- Koypallikarazhma High School
- Vignjaana Santhaayani Sanskrit High School
- C.M.S. L.P.S. Pallickal
- Pallickal Naduvilemuri LPS
- Pope Pius XI Higher Secondary School, Kattanam

== Post office ==
Olakettiampalam Post Office Pin code 690510

== Public library ==
Olakettiambalam has a public library which has been running for the last 49 years. The new building was inaugurated by the minister V. M. Sudheeran.

== Nearby villages ==
Olakettiambalam, Koipallikarazhma, Vathikulangara, Kurthicad, Mullikulangra, Bharanikavu, Peringala, etc.

== Sources ==
- Mavelikara website.
- Mavelikara diocese
