= Onattukara =

Historic state in Kerala, India

Odanad
- 11th – 18th century
- Capital: Kayamkulam (after 15th century)Mavelikkara (before 15th century)
- Common languages: Malayalam
- Religion: Hinduism
- Government: Feudal Monarchy
- Kayamkulam Raja
- History
  - Established: 11th century
  - Disestablished: 1746
Preceded by	Succeeded by
Chera Perumals	Kingdom of Travancore
- Today part of: India Kerala

Odanad (Malayalam: ōṭānāṭŭ, also known as Onattukara, Kayamkulam, Onad, Kallikoilon, and Chirava Svaroopam) was a feudal state in late medieval Kerala.

It was established in the 11th century, and disestablished in 1746 when it became part of Travancore Kingdom after the King Marthanda Varma's northern expedition. The last king of Odanad was King Kotha Varma. At the time of its dissolution, it was composed of the present-day taluks of Mavelikkara, Karthikapally, Chenganur in the Alappuzha district and Karunagapally in the Kollam district. Another name of onattukara is kayamkulam. In the 15th century, the capital of Odanad was moved from Kandiyoor-Muttom to Eruva and Krishnapuram in Kayamkulam, which led to the state being called Kayamkulam. After this shift, Kayamkulam became the commercial centre of Odanad, while Mavelikkara remained its cultural centre. Odanad was controlled by Nair lords, among whom the ruler of Kayamkulam was the most prominent.

== Etymology ==
The word Odanad is a transliteration of the Malayalam word ഓടനാട്, ōṭānāṭŭ, which is a portmanteau of ഓടം, ōṭām, meaning boat, and നാട്, nāṭŭ, meaning land, so Odanad means the land of boats. An alternative hypothesis is that the first part of the word derives from ഓടമുള, ōṭāmuḷa, meaning bamboo, and that Odanad means the land of bamboo. Kerala Varma Valiya Koil Thampuran's Sanskrit work Mayura Sandesam describes Odanad as the land of vines.

Kayamkulam is the capital of Odanad, the central figure in the festival of Onam. The state was hence known as Onattukara (ഓണാട്ടുകര, ōṇāṭṭukara), which translates to the land of Onam.

The state was metonymically referred to as Kayamkulam after the capital was moved to the city of Kayamkulam.

== History ==
=== 11th – 14th century ===
The history of Onattukara (Odanad) during the medieval period is documented through epigraphical records and literary works. The Thiruvalla copper plates (dated to the 11th century CE) contain references to Odanad and its early capital, Mattom. Literary works such as the Unnuneeli Sandesam (14th century) provide context on the region, noting the significance of Chennithala. Much of the genealogical information regarding the rulers of Odanad is derived from inscriptions found at the Kandiyoor Sree Mahadeva Temple, notably the record of King Rama Kotha Varma (dated 1218 CE).

=== 15th – 18th century ===
In 1743, Odanad was bordered by the feudal states of Pandalam, Thekkumkur, Elayadath, Vadakkumkur, Purakkad, and Thrikkunnapuzha, according to records left by Julius Valentin van Gollenesse, Commander of Dutch Malabar at the time.

By 1746, Odanad had been persuaded by the Dutch to take up the leadership of a new confederation which included Chembakassery, Thekkumkur and Purakkad. In this fourth war known as Battle of Purakkad between the states, Odanad was again defeated and its territories finally annexed to Travancore.

== Politics ==
=== Government ===
Odanad was controlled by Nair lords, among whom the ruler of Kayamkulam was the most prominent.

=== Foreign relations ===
Odanad maintained friendly relations with the Portuguese and the Dutch empires starting from the 16th century, primarily due to its strategic position on the Malabar Coast for the lucrative pepper trade. Odanad was an early ally of the Dutch East India Company (VOC) in Malabar and hosted a Portuguese factory in the 16th century.

==== Dutch Relations and Travancore Conflict ====
The relationship with the Dutch became increasingly significant in the 18th century, especially as the rising power of Travancore under Marthanda Varma threatened the independence of the northern states. The Dutch, aiming to maintain the balance of power and secure their commercial interests in the region, began actively supporting an anti-Travancore alliance which included Odanad (Kayamkulam), Desinganadu (Kollam), Cochin, and Thekkumkur.

- Battle of Colachel and Aftermath (1741): The Dutch policy of political interference ultimately failed following the decisive defeat of the VOC by Travancore at the Battle of Colachel in 1741. This event significantly weakened Dutch influence in Kerala.
- Treaty of Mannar (1742): Following a period of conflict, the Raja of Odanad sued for peace with Travancore and signed the Treaty of Mannar in 1742.
- Annexation (1746): Despite the earlier treaty, Odanad was later persuaded by the Dutch to take the leadership of a new confederation against Travancore in 1746, which culminated in the Battle of Purakkad. Odanad was defeated, and its territories were finally annexed into the Kingdom of Travancore, effectively ending its status as an independent state.

=== Military ===
The Odanad Dynasty, also known as the "Kayamkulam Dynasty" in its later period, possessed one of the strongest and most respected military forces in ancient Kerala. The army was a major source of strength, often providing crucial military support to surrounding local states in their conflicts.

==== Organization and Strength ====
The Odanad military power was primarily controlled by Nair lords, among whom the ruler of Kayamkulam was the most prominent. The Nairs were the traditional aristocratic martial class of the region, and the military structure relied heavily on their feudal contingents.

- Size: The king of Odanad was recorded to have commanded a substantial force of approximately 15,000 efficient and well-trained soldiers during the 18th century conflicts against Travancore.
- Military Station: The town of Krishnapuram served as the primary military station of Odanad before it was annexed by Travancore.

==== The Kayamkulam Vaal (Sword) ====
The identity weapon of the Odanad military and aristocracy was the Kayamkulam Vaal (Kayamkulam sword). This weapon was not merely a tool of war but a significant cultural and aristocratic symbol.

- Design: The *Vaal* was a slightly curved, double-edged sword, distinguishing it from the single-edged talwar common in northern India. Its design was specially adapted for the demands of dueling and close-quarters combat on the terrain of Kerala.
- Craftsmanship: The double-edged blade was notable for its dangerous and peculiar profile in local warfare. Its efficient construction is often attributed to the Kattuvalli metal smiths of Kandiyoor.
- Symbolism: As a double-edged sword, it symbolized royalty and elite status among the Nair aristocracy. The hilt often featured silver inlays, sometimes incorporating motifs like the caduceus (serpent), reflecting the cultural reverence for snakes in regional Hindu rituals.
- Legacy: The sword remains a key cultural relic. Preserved examples of the *Kayamkulam Vaal* are prominently displayed at the Krishnapuram Palace Museum in Kayamkulam.

== Economy ==
The King of Kayamkulam had trade relations with foreigners in the backwaters west of Pullukulangara. As proof of this, major trade can still be seen in the Pandikashala. From this, the king had unprecedented financial reserves. When Marthanda Varma attacked Kayamkulam, the king escaped to Iringlakudak through this port.

== Demographics ==
=== Religion ===
==== Chettikulangara Temple ====
The Chettikulangara Devi Temple in Chettikulangara, Mavelikkara Thaluk near Kayamkulam is dedicated to the Hindu goddess Chettikulangara Amma. It is believed to have been consecrated by Padmapadacharyar, a disciple of Adi Shankara, on the Uthrattathi day of Makara month in 823 AD. The goddess worshipped here is believed to have been a family deity, and later emerged as the village and then the regional deity. Local historians oppose the argument that the temple is not as ancient as the nearby Kandiyoor Sree Mahadeva Temple or Mavelikkara Krishna Swamy Temple and Kannamangalam Mahadeva Temple, as it had not been mentioned in the Unnuneeli Sandesam written in the 14th century. Also, there is no mention of the temple in the British survey records. According to the late Kandiyoor Mahadeva Shasthri, Samudra Bandhan, a leading courtier of Ravi Varman, an ancient King of Venad had visited this temple and written poems on Bhagavathi. They also hold that Aadithya Kulasekharan, the King of Venad (1374 to 1389), had also visited the Chettikulangara temple.

The mythology surrounding the temple says that after Parasurama created Kerala, he had established 108 Durga temples, 108 Shiva temples, numerous Sastha temples, and also 108 Kalaris (place to learn traditional martial arts in front of the deity), Shakthi Kendras and five Ambalayams, one of which was Jagadambika of Chettikulangara, the Goddess of Odanad. The myth behind the temple's origin is related to a clash between local landlords, and is clearly mentioned in the Kuthiyotta Pattu. The actual Paradevatha Dtas built by Kayamkulam Rajas (king). Lord Krishna is the Aradhana Moorthy (worship) of Kayamkulam Rajas. Makaram Festival is one of the largest festivals in Central Travancore. This festival is celebrated in 10 days (ulsavam). The seventh and eighth days' festivals are very important. 7-ulsavam is celebrated in temple's west region (padinjare kara) and 8-ulsavam is celebrated in temple's east region (kizhakke kara). Eruva Sreekrishna's Arattukulam is one of biggest ponds in middle Kerala. The Valiya Kakkanadu Madom near to Eruva Sree Krishna swamy temple is famous for the Gandharva temple, warriors who trained the military arts for Odanadu army and army heads of King belonged to this family.

The ancient temple at the place Evoor is in the Onattukara region. This temple had originated in the presence of Bhagavan Sri Krishna himself.

This temple is one of the most important 26 Maha-Vishnu shrines in the world. The myth is linked to 'Khandava-dahanam' (burning of Khandava forest), described in 'Mahabharata'. The remains of burnt trees being widely found here confirm this. Further evidence are, nearby Mannarassala and 'Pandavarkavu' temples. (The research conducted by the archaeology department of Kerala reveals that the fossil remains found in the fields near the temple are not burned one. The forest cover fell down centuries back due to excessive sea level increase, which flooded the area. Carbon dating is also done to determine the time period.)

The great Kanva Maharshi (one of the top 7 Rishis), had been living in this part of Onattukara. 'Kannamangalam' (Kanva-mangalam) is nearby. His 'Ashramam' (hermitage) later became a temple. Evoor Krishnaswamy's yearly 'Arattu' (ceremonial bath) is held in this temple's tank.

===== Origin =====
According to local mythology, Agni deva, the Hindu god of fire, had been suffering from a severe stomach ailment. As a remedy, Lord Brahma advised him to consume the herb-rich Khandava Forest. The forest was home to serpent-king Takshaka, a close friend of Lord Indra. Whenever Agni tried to consume the forest, Lord Indra's thundershowers dutifully extinguished the fire.

Agni appeared in the form of a brahmin to seek the help of Krishna and Arjuna, who were visiting the area. They set up a fire to consume the forest. Maharshi Kanva arrived to save his 'Archa Murti'. a four armed image of Vishnu. Krishna granted a boon that the murti would not be harmed by fire. Soon, Agni started consuming Khandava Forest. Lord Indra used thundershowers promptly but on Krishna's advice, Arjuna constructed a canopy of arrows to prevent the rain from disrupting Agni's consumption of the forest. Thus Agni's ailment was cured.

As a sign of thankfulness, Agni sought permission to install that murti in a new temple there to facilitate worship. As instructed by Krishna, Arjuna fired an arrow to determine the location. A new temple was soon consecrated where the arrow had landed. Evoor is the shortened form of 'Eytha ooru', meaning the place from where the arrows were showered to make the canopy of arrows. Krishna infused his divine power into the murti and Arjuna performed its first puja. A murti of Bhootha Natha Swamy (Kiratha Murti form of Lord Siva), together with Yakshi Amma (Devi Parvati) were consecrated as the sub-deities. The ancient trees roofing them are the survivors of Khandava Forest.

===== Fire and re-construction =====
In the 1880s, the temple was destroyed in a fire. When the 'Sree Kovil' (sanctum sanctorum) caught fire, many people tried to remove the Deity, but failed. At last, an old Brahmana-devotee of the adjacent house, after taking a dip in the temple tank, entered the raging flames and brought out the Deity safely.

Sri Moolam Thirunal, then king of Travancore, was in Kasi at that time. Appearing as a Brahmana-boy in his dream, Sri Krishna asked the king to re-construct the Evoor temple. Immediately, the king returned home and constructed a huge temple complex. It contained royal facilities such as security trenches atop the roof all around and underground drainage network to discharge the 'abhishka water' from 'Srikovil' to the adjacent temple tank.

The renowned 'Tharananalloor Tantri' (whose ancestor had been brought to Kerala by Sri Parashurama) was appointed as the traditional 'Tantri'. Immense wealth (including lands and other assets) was arranged to ensure self-reliance. Also, extensive neighbourhood facilities and all necessary infrastructure were put in place for the temple.

===== Prayoga Chakra Prathishta =====
Evoor Bhagavan's Deity is the unique Prayoga Chakra Prathishta. It is presented in the four-armed Vishnu form with Panchajanya Shankha, Sudarshana Chakra, and butter in three hands, and the fourth arm held on the hip as a mani-bandham.

Bhagavan is ready to release 'Sudarshana Chakra'. He is the 72-year-old Sri Krishna.

Vedic experts have confirmed the extremely rare divine presence of "Sri Chakra" on this deity. Consequently, "Raktha-pushpanjali" is a special offering here which is unavailable in Vishnu temples elsewhere.

Evoor temple is popularly known as the "Guruvayoor of Onattukara".

Evoor temple is situated near the Cheppad Railway station between Kayamkulam and Harippad. The railway line is called the "Theera Desa" (coastal route which is not the main railway route). It is easier to reach there by bus. Cheppad is about 7 km north of Kayamkulam bus stand. From Harippad Bus stand Evoor is about 5 km south. You can get down at Cheppad Junction and go by an auto-rickshaw to Evoor temple. Alternatively, one can get down at the bus stop (south of Cheppad and north of Ramapuram Devi temple) on NH-47 and walk up to the temple which is about 1 km east of NH-47.

==== Buddhist legacy ====
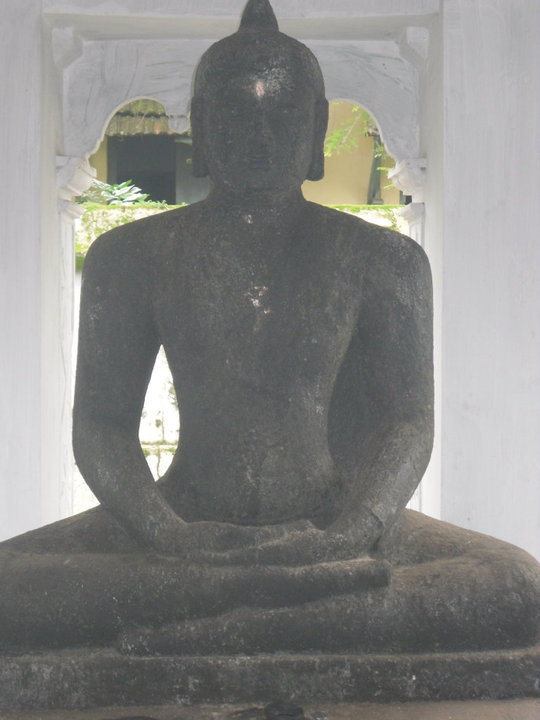
Buddha statue at Mavelikkara

Mavelikkara was once a flourishing centre of Buddhist culture, and an ancient Buddha statue currently raised in Mavelikkara town, at Buddha Junction in front of the Krishnaswamy temple, was excavated by accident in the early 1900s from a paddy field near the Kandiyoor temple. It is possible that a lot more of the vanished Buddhist civilisation of Onnattukara still lies buried in history, yet to be unearthed. Names of towns and villages in the Onattukara region carry the palli suffix, which was common usage in Pāli, the language of Hinayana Buddhism. Karunagapalli, Karthikapalli, Pallickal, Pallippuram, and Puthupalli are examples of such historical and present names of places in the Onattukara region.

==== Ramapuram Bhagavthi Temple-Odanadu Dynasty Temple ====
Ramapuram Bhagavathy Temple[Ramapurathamma ] is considered as the Kingdom deity temple of Odanadu(Kayamkulam Kingdom) [Odanadu Rulers]. After stealing the Sreechakram, sanctified at sanctum of Ramapurathamma, the then Trippappur king Marthandavarma and his Chief [Dalava] Ramayyan had conquered Kayamkulam .The absence of the most sacred Sreechakram rendered them powerless and it paved the way for Marthanda Varma to establish his supremacy over Kayamkulam dynasty .

== Syrian Christians of Odanad ==
The Syrian Christians of Odanad existed even before the establishment of the Kingdom. Chengannur was the earliest centre where the Chengannur Old Syrian Church was established in the 4th century by the Syrian Christian migrants from Niranam and Nilakkal. Later in the 7th century, a church was built in Haripad, but was demolished in the 11th century. Half of the Syrian Christians of Haripad joined the Karthikapally Syrian Church, which was built in AD 829 by the Syrian Christian migrants from Chengannur, and the other half established the Cheppad Syrian Church in AD 1175. Kayamkulam became a commercial capital owing to its port merchantry, and many Syrian Christians migrated to Kayamkulam. These Syrians relied on the Kadampanad Syrian Church (built in AD 325) till the establishment of the Kayamkulam Kadeesha Syrian Church in AD 824 by Mar Sabor and Mar Aphroth. In AD 943 the Syrian Christians of Mavelikkara built the Mavelikkara Puthiyakavu Syrian Church when they split from the Kayamkulam Kadeesha Syrian Church. Venmoney Syrian Church which was established in AD 1017, one of the famous churches destroyed during the war of the Kayamkulam king and later reconstructed.

== Culture ==
Festivals in Odanad include the Jeevatha Nritham, a traditional form of dance, and the Kettukazhcha, which has its origins in Buddhism.

== See also ==
- History of Kerala
- Battle of Purakkad
