= Treaty of Mavelikkara =

Treaty signed between Kingdom of Travancore and Dutch colonial empire

The Treaty of Mavelikkara was a treaty of peace and friendship concluded between Maharajah Anizham Thirunal Marthanda Varma of Travancore and the Dutch. According to this treaty both the parties agreed to live in friendship and peace. The treaty was signed on 15 August 1753 at Mavelikkara.

The treaty between the Dutch and Travancore included the following provisions:

- Non-aggression and neutrality: The Dutch agreed to adopt a strict policy of peace and refrain from any future conflicts or interference in disputes involving Travancore.
- Restrictions on aiding adversaries: The Dutch would not provide assistance, refuge, or support to Travancore’s enemies.
- Trade agreements:
  - Travancore agreed to sell all its cotton cloth to the Dutch.
  - An annual quota of 3,000 candis of pepper was to be supplied, with an additional 2,000 candis from any future conquests.
- Military supplies from the Dutch:
  - The Dutch committed to supplying war materials, including muskets, gunpowder, and artillery.
  - The value of these supplies was set at 12,000 rupees (or 18,000 gilders) annually.
- Exclusive European presence: Travancore assured that no European power other than the Dutch would be permitted to establish a presence in its territories, except for existing English factories at Anjengo, Edawa, and Vizhinjam, whose privileges would remain unchanged.
- Mutual agreements:
  - Extradition of deserters.
  - Restoration of Dutch goods and personnel shipwrecked along the Travancore coast.
- Dutch tribute to Travancore: The Dutch agreed to pay an annual present of 5,000 gilders, with the final decision on payment left to the discretion of Dutch authorities in Batavia.

The treaty effectively ended the political and commercial dominance of the Dutch on the Kerala coast.
