= Treaty of Mannar =

1742 Treaty signed in Mannar

The Treaty of Mannar which was signed in 1742 resulted in Travancore annexing parts of Kayamkulam and being paid 1000 rupees per month by them. This treaty established peace after a long period of war in the region.

== History ==
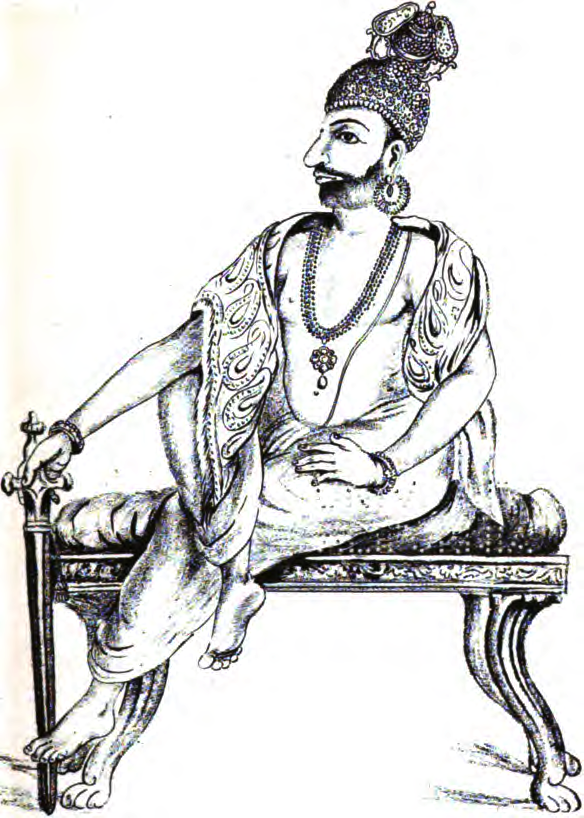
Marthanda Varma, Maharaja of Travancore

The king of Kollam (Desiganad Dynasty) adopted a prince from Kayamkulam Royal Family. Marthanda Varma, the Maharaja of Travancore, disliked this because he wanted to merge Kollam with Travancore after the Raja as he had no male descendants. Maharaja sent his army to Kollam and defeated the Raja. After the war his kingdom annexed Kollam to Travancore. Maharaja brought Kollam Raja to Travancore and built Valiya Koyikkal Kottaram for him, and treated him with royal dignity.

In 1734 Raja escaped from Travancore with the help of Kayamkulam King. Kayamkulam Raja helped to return him to the throne and strengthened his army with the help of Cochin. Kollam became more powerful.

Maharaja sent his Army to Kayamkulam and Kollam under Ramayyan Dalawa. The King of Kayamkulam was shot which forced them to surrender and appeal for peace. After the death of Kollam Raja disputes resumed. Kayamkulam encroached Kollam because of the adoption rule. But Travancore denied this saying the adoption was cancelled in 1731 and war broke out again

Kayamkulam sought the help of the Dutch. In 1741 Maharaja defeated Rani of Kollam and she fled to Cochi. In 1742 the Armies of the Dutch and Kayamkulam attacked Travancore and seized Kilimanoor Fort. To recapture the fort, Maharaja fought for 68 days and defeated his enemies.

== Treaty ==
Maharaja forced the Kayamkulam King to sign a treaty at Mannar in 1742. Raja agreed to merge a major portion of Kayamkulam with Travancore and also pay 1000 rupees every year.

== Results ==
Kayamkulam Raja never agreed the treaty and considered it an insult. Maharaja forced him to pay the tribute. Raja dumped all his wealth in Ashtamudi Lake and fled to the northern Region. The messengers of Maharaja found nothing but an empty palace.
