= Parameswaran (name) =

Parameswaran is a given name and surname. People with the name include:

== Surname ==
- Anupama Parameswaran
- Cuckoo Parameswaran
- Prem Parameswaran
- P. Parameswaran
- Prasanth Parameswaran
- Prabakaran Parameswaran
- Ramaswamy Parameswaran
- Rajasekharan Parameswaran
- C. R. Parameswaran
- Uma Parameswaran
- M. P. Parameswaran
- K. P. Parameswaran
- Chowara Parameswaran

== Given name ==
- Parameswaran Iyer
- Parameswaran II

== See also ==
- Parameswaran Pillai
- Parameswaran Nair
