= Nair Brigade =

Army of the Kingdom of Travancore

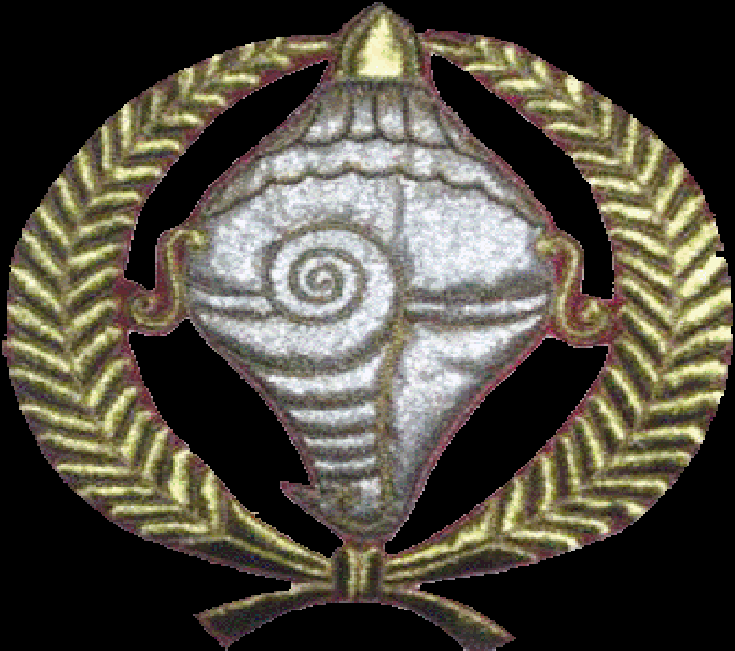
- Flag of Nair Brigade
- Country: Travancore
- Allegiance: Medieval Kerala (until 1729); Travancore (1729-1947); India (1947-present)
- Type: Army
- Role: Land warfare
- Part of: Madras Regiment Indian Army (9th Battalion); Madras Regiment Indian Army (16th Battalion); Indian Armed Forces (1947-present)

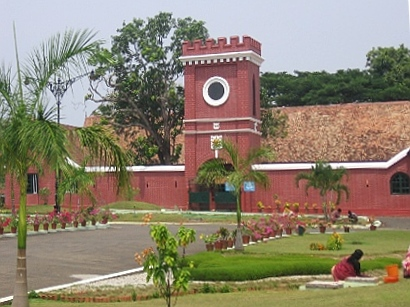
Headquarters of the Nair Brigade of Travancore. The building is now the Legislative Museum of Kerala

The Nair Brigade was the army of the erstwhile kingdom of Travancore in India. Nairs are a warrior community of the region. The personal bodyguard of the king Marthanda Varma (1706–1758) was also called Thiruvithamkoor Nair Pattalam (Travancore Nair Army). The Travancore army was officially referred as the Travancore Nair Brigade in 1818.

== Origin and history ==
The Nairs are the major aristocratic martial caste of Kerala. Each region is governed or ruled by Nair landlords with titles such as Pillai, Kurup, Thachudaya Kaimal, etc. The military setup of Nairs includes Nair soldiers who are encompassed under Nair landlords. There were hundreds of Nair lords in each region of the Kingdom Quilon, who served as Madampi, Naduvazhi, and Deshavazhi, and these Nair landlords and their military united in times of emergency or at the request of Rajas or kings. Sometimes, they have more power or influence over the kings.

During the Travancore period, feudal power declined, and many Nair soldiers were reorganized as Nair Brigade or Travancore Army under the newly formed Travancore kingdom, Its headquarters were in Thiruvanthapuram City.

Nair Brigade defeated the Dutch army with the Travancore army in 1741 at the Battle of Colachel and captured the Dutch commander Captain Eustachius De Lannoy. Marthanda Varma agreed to spare the Dutch captain's life on the condition that he joined his army and trained his soldiers on modern lines.

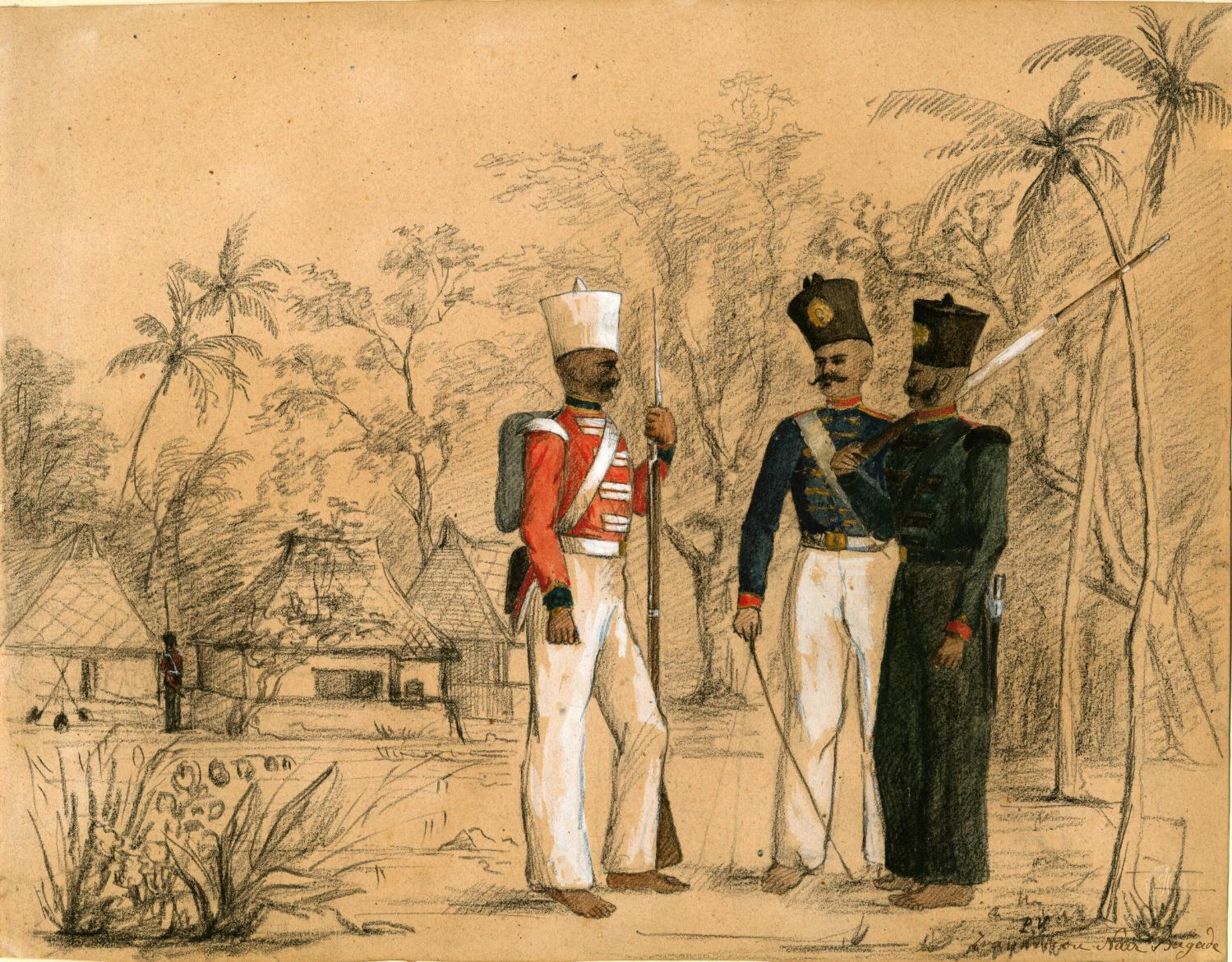
Members of a Nair brigade

The Travancore army was reorganised as the Travancore Nair Brigade in 1818. The Travancore Army was considered a part of the Indian State Forces from 1935. The units were known as the First, Second and Third Travancore infantry. The State Forces consisted of infantry units, the State Forces Artillery, the Travancore Training Centre, the Sudarsan Guards and the State Forces Band. With the integration of the State into the Indian Union, the Nair Brigade was integrated into the Indian Army as the 9th Battalion Madras Regiment (1st Travancore) and the 16th Battalion of the Madras Regiment (2nd Travancore) in 1954.

In the early years, only Nairs were admitted into this brigade. Later, the unit was expanded and several sub-units were formed. These Non-Nairs act as secondary Travancore soldiers under the control of Rajas or Nairs. The name Nair Brigade remained unchanged, even following the admittance of non-Nairs.

== Military operations ==
=== Travancore-Dutch war ===
The Battle of Colachel was fought on 10 August 1741 between the Indian kingdom of Travancore and the Dutch East India Company. During the Travancore-Dutch War, King Travancore (1729–1758) forces defeated the Dutch East India Company's forces led by Admiral Eustachius De Lannoy on 10 August 1741. The Dutch never recovered from the defeat and no longer posed a large colonial threat to India. Travancore won the war with the notable military service of the Travancore Nair Brigade at the sea and seashore, while Anantha Padmanabhan Pillai served as the commander-in-chief of the army on land.

=== Travancore-Calicut war (The Battle of Thrissur) ===
The Battle for Thrissur took place in Thrissur in 1763 between the forces of the Kingdom of Travancore and the Zamorin of Calicut. The Travancore army marched forward under the command of Martanda Pillai. Upon arriving at Paravur, the Travancore commander, on the advice of General de Lannoy, decided upon a direct attack on Thrissur from two sides. For this purpose, the army was divided into two divisions, one under Ayyappan Marthanda Pillai and the other under General de Lannoy. The plan was to launch a converging attack on Thrissur, with the Dalawa marching directly on it while the General was to capture Chetuva and attack it from the north. Thrissur was successfully occupied by Marthanda Pillai's force.

=== The First Battle between Travancore and Tipu Sultan's Mysore ===
The Battle of Nedumkotta took place between December 1789 and May 1790, and it was one of the reasons for the opening of hostilities in the Third Anglo-Mysore War. This battle was fought between Tipu Sultan of the Kingdom of Mysore and Dharma Raja, Maharaja of Travancore. The Mysore army attacked the fortified line in Thrissur district at the Travancore border known as the Nedumkotta. The Mysore army was successfully repulsed by the Travancore army under the leadership of Raja Kesavadas Pillai, Dewan of Travancore.

=== The Second Battle between Travancore and Tipu Sultan's Mysore ===
The Mysorean forces launched a second attack near Nedumkotta. During the second battle in April 1790, Vaikom Padmanabha Pillai played an active role in the defeat of Tipu Sultan at the hands of the Travancore Army. He is also credited with heavily injuring one of Tipu's legs, leaving him lame on one side. After this, Padmanabha Pillai served as a general in the Travancore Maharaja's militia. Following this incident, Tipu Sultan never attempted to cross the borders of Travancore again.

=== Other Notable Operations ===
Other notable engagements include World War II, Operation Polo, the Sino-Indian War, the Indo-Pakistan War of 1965, the Indo-Pakistan War of 1971, Operation Rakshak, Operation Parakram, and Operation Pawan in 1987–89, all part of the Indian Army, the British-Indian Army, the 9th and 16th Madras Indian Regiment, and the IPFK.

== Martial race ==
When considering the historical and cultural significance of the Nairs, their social status, martial experience, leadership qualities, and active involvement in the Travancore Nair Brigade within the British Indian Army and other Indian regiments, the British Raj census classified Nairs as a "Military caste" or "Martial race" of India. Other groups included in this categorization were Rajputs, Bhumikar Brahmins, Brahmins, Marathas, Pathans, Baloch, etc.

== Strength ==
The Army of Travancore was very strong during the 1700s. Later, after 1809 with the strengthening of English East India Company, and with Travancore signing a treaty handing over defense to the Company's army, the Nair Brigade headcount was reduced to 700 soldiers without arms and discipline, which was later increased to 1200 in number by request of then resident queen of Travencore, Gowri Parvati Bayi in 1819.

The total strength of Travancore Nair Army in 1945 was 4,082 men, of which 84 were officers and 132 were JCOs. A part of this force (those within medical categorization 'A') were absorbed into the Indian Army (Travancore - Cochin unified forces), while the remaining forces were disbanded. After the unification of Travancore and Cochin forces, Trivandrum was declared as the headquarters of the unified command. Major General V.N. Parameswaran Pillai, the GOC of the Travancore Nair army, became the commandant of the unified forces. The unified force was divided into five infantry battalions (Travancore - I, II, III and IV, Cochin I). The unification took place under Major General V.N. Parameswaran Pillai of Travancore and Lt Col G.S. Subbiah of Cochin on 20 May 1949. Finally the forces unified Travancore-Cochin forces were either disbanded or absorbed into the Indian Army and Major General V.N. Parameswaran Pillai was allowed to retire.

The first group of State Forces of Cochin Kingdom was also called as the Nair Brigade in 1940. The Brigade's name was changed in 1945 to Cochin State Forces by Kerala Varma and allowed non-Nairs also to be admitted into his army. Following the integration of Travancore Army with the Indian Forces, the Pazhavangadi Ganapathi Temple in Thiruvananthapuram which the Brigade maintained and owned was likewise transferred to the Indian Army.

== Ranks of the Nair Brigade ==
Nair Brigade Rank	Salary In Travancore Rupees (1897)
Commanding Officer	559 - 1017
Sergeant Major	173
Subadar-Major	40
Subadar	24 - 30
Jamadar	12 - 15
Havildar-Major	11
Havildar	9
Naigue	8
Sepoy	6 - 7

== See also ==
- History of Thiruvananthapuram
- Battle of Colachel
- Battle of Nedumkottta
- 9th Battalion Madras Regiment
- Pazhavangadi Ganapathy Temple
