= 9th Battalion, Madras Regiment =

Regiment of the Indian Army

9th Battalion The Madras Regiment
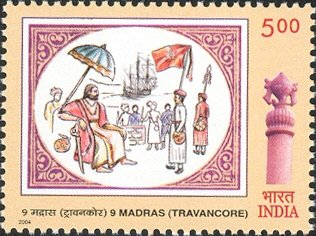
- Tricentenary postal stamp, 2004
- Active: 1704
- Country: India
- Allegiance: Travancore; Indian Army
- Branch: Madras Regiment
- Type: Infantry
- Role: Light Infantry
- Regimental Centre: Wellington, Ooty, Nilgiris District, Tamil Nadu
- Engagements: Travancore–Dutch War; Battle of Colachel; World War II; Operation Polo; Sino-Indian War; Indo-Pakistani War of 1965; Indo-Pakistani War of 1971; Operation Rakshak; Operation Parakram

The 9th battalion of the Madras Regiment (Travancore) is the oldest extant unit in the Indian Army. It has been in service for over 300 years.

== History ==
The battalion was raised in 1704 at Padmanabhapuram, the capital of the erstwhile kingdom of Travancore. Raised as personal bodyguards to the Maharaja of Travancore, the unit, though redesigned through the ages, continues to retain its individual identity with no history of disbandment or re-raising.

The Travancore Army, known as the Nair Brigade, completely exterminated the superior and better equipped Dutch Forces which landed at Colachel in July 1741 during the reign of Anizham Thirunal Veer Bala Marthand Varma. In the Battle of Colachel, during the Travancore–Dutch War, Capt Eustachius De Lannoy, a Commander of the Dutch fleet, was captured and was asked later to train the Travancore Army. From 1741 to 1758, Capt De Lannoy remained in command of the Travancore Forces and was involved in annexation of small principalities.

In 1935, the Travancore State joined the Indian State Forces Scheme and the battalion was named 1st Travancore Nair Infantry, Travancore State Forces. The unit was reorganised as an Indian State Infantry Battalion by Lieutenant Colonel H S Steward who was appointed Commandant of the Travancore State Forces.

== World War II ==
In 1940, the battalion left for Padmanabhapuram and arrived at Military Station, Cannanore. The battalion served overseas in the 1940s. In 1945, Major General V.N. Parameswaran Pillai was appointed GOC Travancore State Forces. In the same year, the unit was asked to move to South East Asia Command. Embarked on at Taima, the unit sailed to Hong Kong. Disembarked at Kowloon Harbour, it was placed under the command of the 150th Indian Infantry Brigade. While at Kowloon, the unit was assigned the task of guarding Japanese prisoners of war, airfields and docks. It also looked after the repatriation of POWs to Japan. The unit left Hong Kong, disembarked at Madras and arrived at Trivandrum on 31 January 1947.

== Indian Army ==
In April 1951, the battalion was integrated with Indian Army and on 1 May 1954, it was merged with the Madras Regiment and was re-designated 9th Battalion of the Madras Regiment (Travancore). After the integration of Travancore State Force with the Indian Army, the State Forces Colours were ceremonially laid up at Chetwode Hall, Indian Military Academy, Dehradun in 1956. The then-incumbent President of India, V. V. Giri, presented Colours to the battalion on 23 May 1970 at Barrack Square, Wellington at a solemn ceremony.

In fond recognition of their bravery, people started calling them terrors. Post Independence, the battalion served from Siachen to Andaman and Nicobar Islands and from Nagaland to Rajasthan.

=== Operational Achievement ===
- The battalion actively participated in the Hyderabad Police Action (Operation Polo) during 1948 and was instrumental in restoring peace and tranquility in the riot-torn region.
- For the first time, the unit was deployed in high altitude areas in the Sugar Sector in Punjab and Himachal Pradesh and occupied forward posts in inhospitable terrain during the 1962 Indo-China War.
- During the Indo-Pakistani War of 1965, the battalion located at Firozpur under the 65th Infantry Brigade fought the famous Battle of Burki and played a leading role in the capture of Barka-Kalan and Ichogil Bund. The battalion was honoured with one Vir Chakra, two Sena Medals, twelve Mentioned in dispatches and the theatre honour Punjab.
- In Nagaland, the battalion conducted operations against Naga hostiles. The unit performed extremely well and was awarded one Sena Medal and two COAS commendation cards.
- The 9th battalion took part in Operation Cactus-Lilly during the Indo-Pakistani War of 1971. The battalion, deployed under the 330rd Infantry Brigade at Barmer, captured Mahendro Ro Par and Fateh Ro Par on Gadra City-Umraokot axis. It remained deployed at Naya Chor till the announcement of ceasefire on 17 December 1971. During this operation, it suffered ten casualties. In another operation, during the 1971 War, Captain Gopal Kumar Raman Pillai was awarded the Vir Chakra.
- The battalion served in the Andaman and Nicobar Islands from 1990 to 1994 where it had the opportunity to undertake anti-poaching operations in conjunction with Indian Navy and the Indian Air Force. The unit was awarded one Vishisht Seva Medal and four GOC-in-C Southern Command commendation cards during these operations.
- During the (Operation Rakshak), the battalion conducted counter-insurgency operations in the Bhadarwah and Rajouri Sectors. It neutralised more than 35 militants and captured a large quantity of weapons, ammunition and explosives including SAM missiles, UMGs and a sniper rifle. Major Sajjan Singh Gahalawat and three ORs (Other Ranks) made supreme sacrifice during these operations. The unit was awarded two Shaurya Chakra, three Sena Medals, two COAS commendation cards and two GOC-in-C commendation cards.
- While participating in Operation Meghdoot, the unit served at the world's highest battlefield from 2000 to 2001. It occupied the Actual Ground Position Line (AGPL) in Siachen. During this operation, the battalion suffered two casualties due to adverse weather conditions.
- During Operation Parakram, the unit was operationally deployed at Turtuk, Baramulla, Handanbrog, Dras and Kargil.

== See also ==
- Nair Brigade
