= Vaikom Padmanabha Pillai =

Military officer of the Kingdom of Travancore

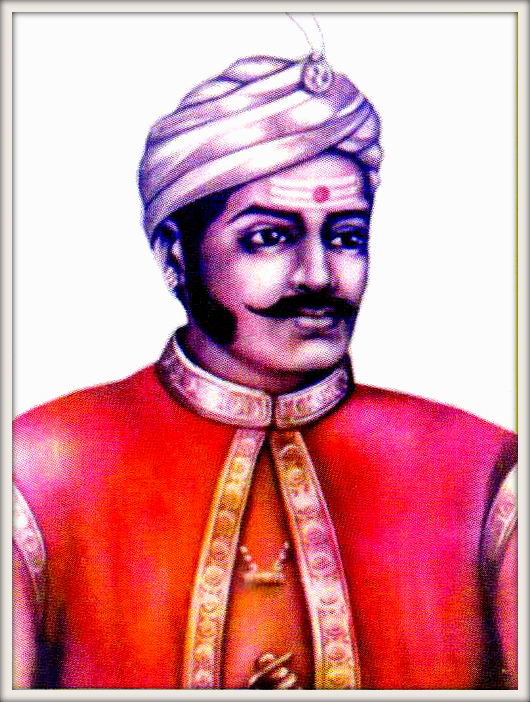
Vaikom Padmanabha Pillai

Vaikom Padmanabha Pillai (1767–1809) was a Nair Militia leader and military officer of the Kingdom of Travancore (now roughly the Indian state of Kerala). In 1808 he led an uprising against British control in Travancore. He was captured in 1809 and hanged for his role in the rebellion.

== Life ==
He was born in the principality of Travancore and was called up in to the Travancore Nair Army in 1789, when Tipu Sultan invaded Travancore. He was one of the 20 reserve soldiers from the Nandyat Kalari who ambushed the huge Mysore Army in the Nedumkotta fortifications in December 1789. He also played an active role in the defeat of Tipu Sultan at the hands of the Travancore Army during the second battle in April 1790. He is also credited to have heavily injured a leg of Tipu, leaving him lame on one leg. After this he served as a general in Travancore Maharaja's militia.

When Velu Thampi Dalawa rebelled against the British East India Company, Padmanabha Pillai was his army chief. Freedom fighters jointly under Padmanabha Pillai and Chempil Valiya Arayan attacked British Resident Col. Macaulay in Poonjikkara Residency (now, Bolghaty Palace) in December 1808, but could not capture him. Later he ambushed a party of British soldiers at Pallathuruthy near Alappuzha which resulted in the deaths of 13 British soldiers. Padmanabha Pillai was captured by the British and hanged in public a few days later at Thiruveli kunnu in Vaikom.
