= Parameswaran Pillai =

Parameswaran Pillai is a surname. Notable people with the surname include:

- Changanassery Parameswaran Pillai, Social reformer, lawyer and judge
- C. I. Parameswaran Pillai (1898–1979), Indian actor
- V. N. Parameswaran Pillai
- Nadakkal Parameswaran Pillai, Restaurant chain in India, run by co-operative societies
- Jayakumar Parameswaran Pillai, Indian actor
- G. P. Pillai (Govindan Parameswaran Pillai)
