= Battle of Ichogil Bund =

Skirmish of the Indo-Pakistani war of 1965

Coordinates: 31.660°N 74.485°E

- Part of the Indo-Pakistani war of 1965
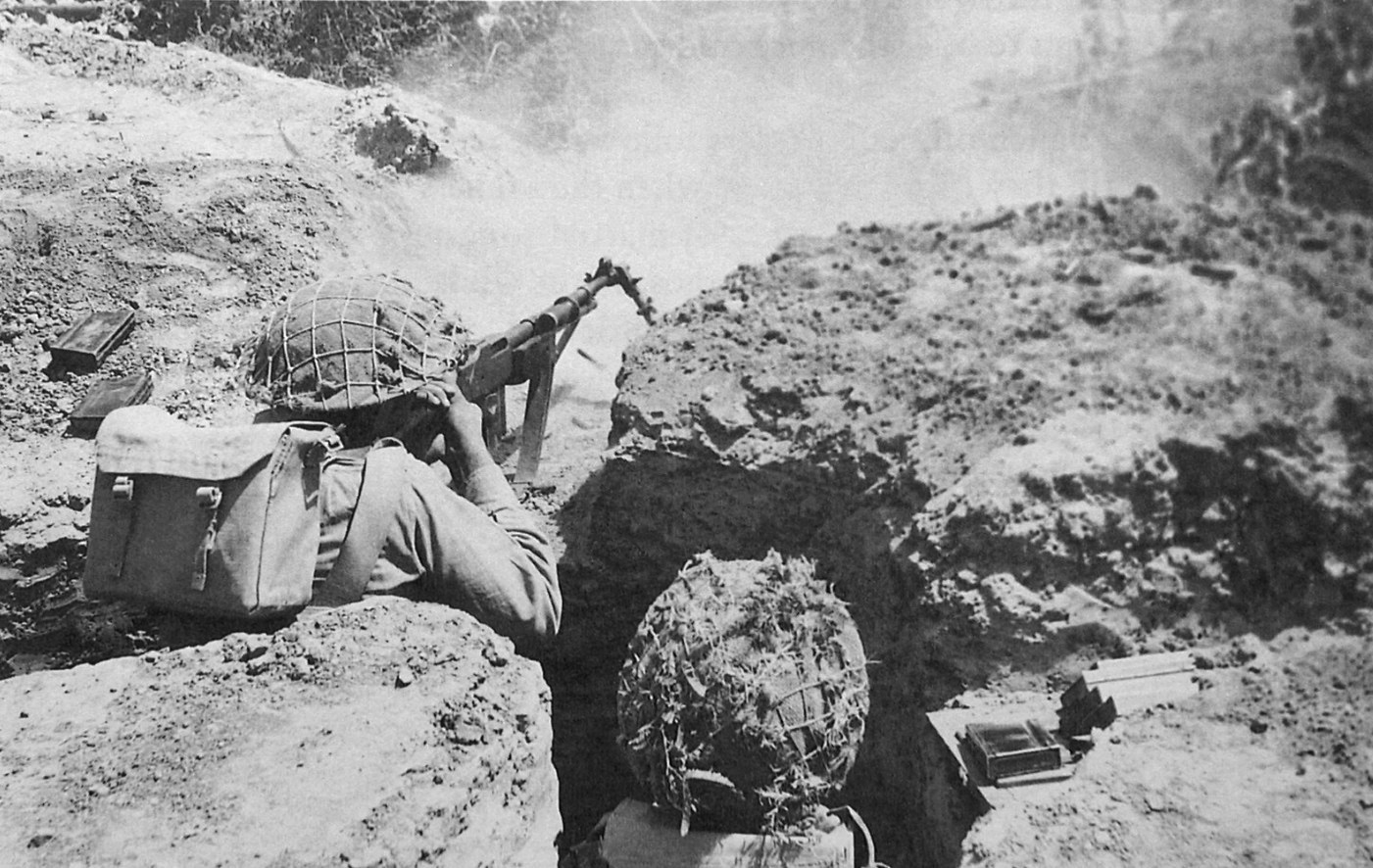
- Pakistani soldiers engaging with Indian forces at the BRB Canal
Date	22–23 September 1965 (1 day)
Location	Ichogil Canal, Punjab, Pakistan
Result	Indian victory

Belligerents
India	Pakistan

Units involved
9th Battalion, Madras Regiment	3rd Battalion, Baluch Regiment

Strength
3 companies	150–250 (2 companies)

Casualties and losses
49 dead 65 wounded	48 dead and 80 jumped into the canal and washed away. 11 captured 2 RCL guns captured

The Battle of Ichogil Bund also known as the Battle of BRB Canal was a skirmish fought from 22 to 23 September 1965 as part of the Indo-Pakistani War of 1965 by the 9th Battalion Madras Regiment, under the command of Lieutenant Colonel B.K. Satyan.

== Background ==
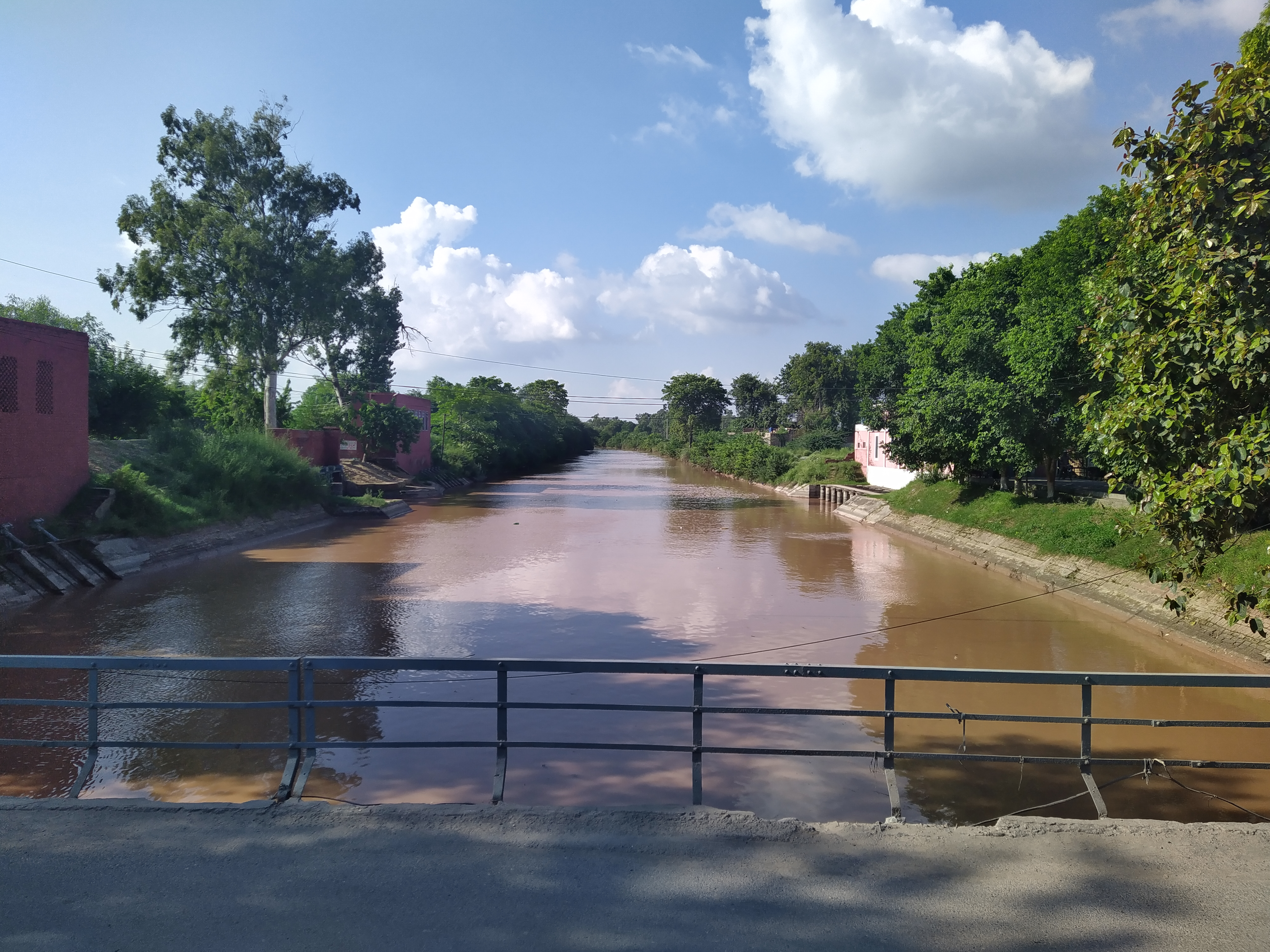
The Ichogil Canal in present-day

The Ichogil Canal was constructed by the Pakistani government in the 1950s partly as a defensive obstacle to prevent an hypothetical invasion of Lahore. At 45 m (148 ft) wide and 5 m (16 ft) deep, it presents a serious obstacle for any invading military force. Much of the battle was fought from across the canal, with tanks providing fire support to a ground team which had crossed the canal.

== The battle ==
The battle was notable for being fought after the cease-fire had been signed on 22 September. The Pakistani defences of the Ichogil Bund were built around the village of Burki, which was penetrated by the advancing Indian armour around 10 September 1965. Confronted with this Indian offensive, the Pakistanis withdrew in disarray from Burki to mount a defence at the bund. They had blown off the bridge in the process, only to reoccupy a part of it in large numbers, before the Indians could consolidate their gains. Fighting began around midnight and lasted for about two and a half hours. At the end of the fighting, described as do-or-die by the Indians, Indian soldiers had crossed the canal and were just six miles from the city of Lahore.

== Casualties and losses ==
Indian casualties in the battle included 49 killed and 65 wounded. Pakistani casualties included 48 dead and an estimated 80 jumped into the canal and were washed away, presumably dead, and 11 captured, including one officer. The Indians captured considerable amount of Pakistani arms and ammunition, including 2 RCL guns.

== See also ==
- Indo-Pakistan Wars
- Operation Grand Slam
