= Battle of Thrissur =

Conflict in 1763

- Part of Wars involving Travancore
Date	1763; 263 years ago
Location	Thrissur, India
Result	Travancore Victory

Belligerents
Kingdom of Travancore	Kingdom of Calicut

Commanders and leaders
Marthanda Varma Eustachius De Lannoy	Zamorin Raja

The Battle of Thrissur took place at Thrissur in 1763 between the forces of the Kingdom of Travancore and the Zamorin of Calicut.

== Prelude ==
Paliath Achan of the Kingdom of Cochin and Maharaja Rama Varma of the Kingdom of Travancore made an alliance to drive out the Zamorin of Calicut from the territories belonging to the Raja of Kochi. Kingdom of Cochin accepted to cede parts of these territories to Travancore after the conquest.

== Battle ==
The Travancore army marched forward under the command of the Dalawa Martanda Pillai. On arriving at Paravur, the Travancore commander on the advice of General de Lannoy decided upon a direct attack on Thrissur from two sides. For this purpose the army was grouped, in two divisions, one under Ayyappan Marthanda Pillai and the other under General de Lannoy. The plan was to make a converging attack on Thrissur, the Dalawa marching directly on it while the General was to capture Chetuva and attack it from the north. Thrissur was successfully occupied by Marthanda Pillai's force. The Zamorin's forces at Thrissur were caught within the blades of this scissors; but from this difficult position the ruler of Calicut extricated himself by ordering his garrison at Chetuva to fight desperate rearguard actions in which every inch of territory was resisted. Though the Zamorin's force resisted obstinately for a time, still it was no match to General de Lannoy' s disciplined army and it was therefore compelled to retreating.

== Aftermath ==
The Calicut forces evacuated the Cochin Territory. Zamorin sued for peace and agreed to indemnify Travancore for the expenses of the war by paying the moderate sum of one hundred and fifty thousand rupees, promising perpetual friendship.

== See also ==
- Battle of Nedumkotta
- Siege of Chaliyam
- Battle of Colachel
