= History of Thiruvananthapuram =

The history of Thiruvananthapuram dates back to the 18th century AD. In 1795, the city became the capital of the princely state of Travancore. Several historic landmarks of the city, including the Kowdiar Palace, University of Kerala, and Napier Museum were built during that period. After independence, Thiruvananthapuram was made the capital of the state of Kerala.

== Ancient and Medieval history ==
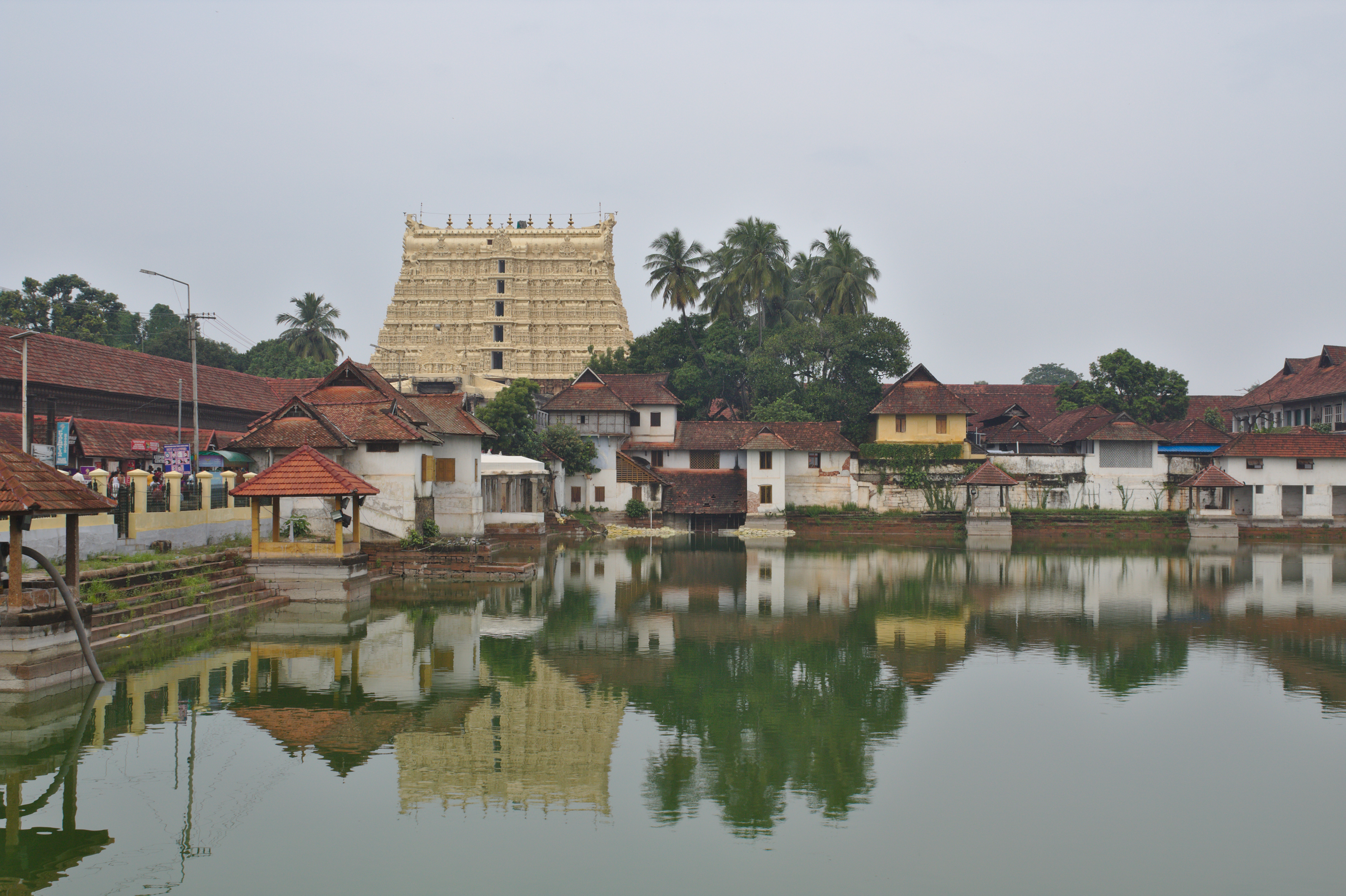
Padmanabhaswamy Temple

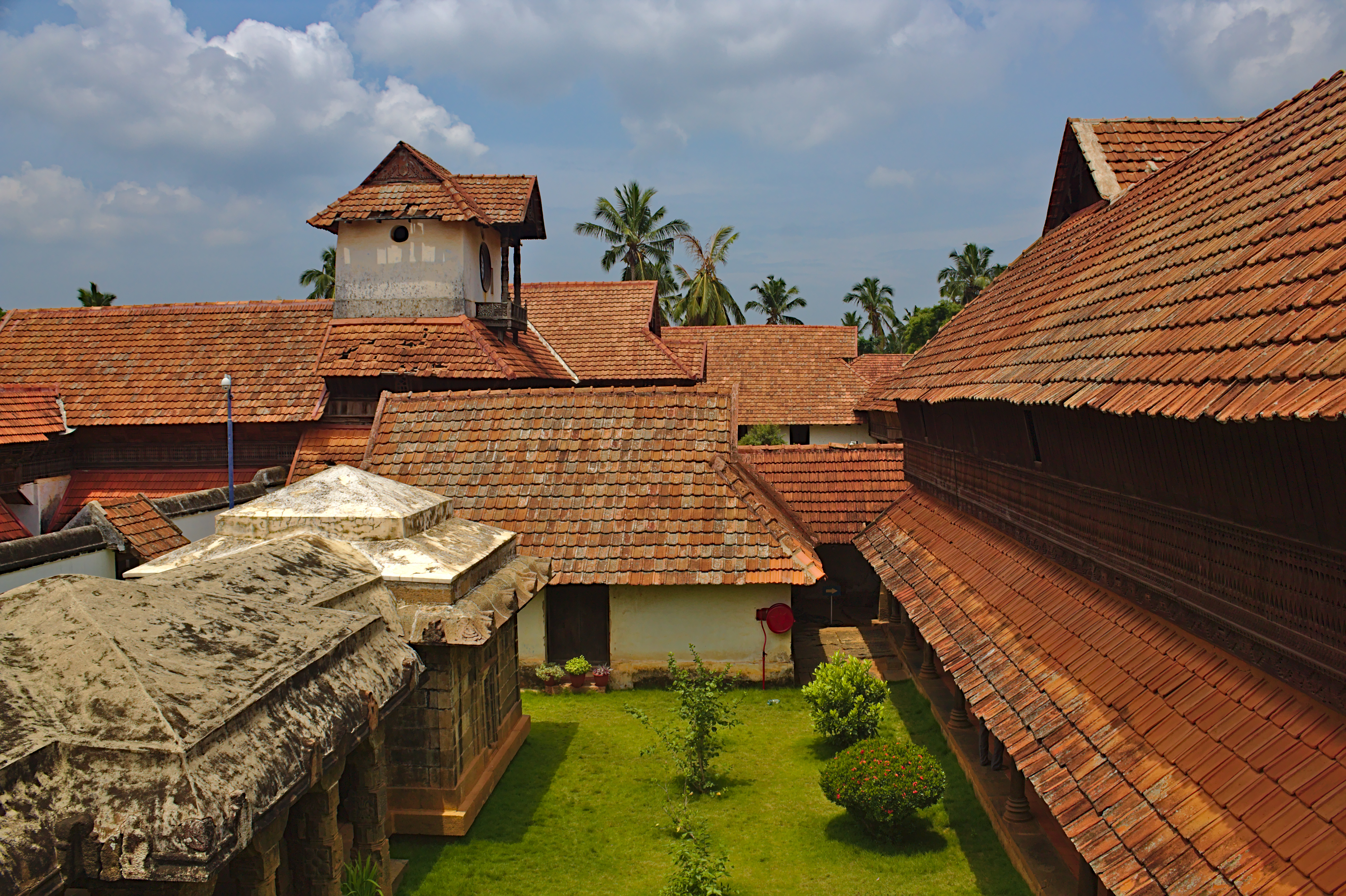
Padmanabhapuram Palace

According to legend, the site of Thiruvananthapuram was once a jungle known as Anantan Kādu, which was home to a Pulayar couple who cultivated rice. One day, the wife heard a baby crying as she was weeding. After a search, she found a child so beautiful that she assumed it was divine and was afraid to touch it. She fed the baby some milk and left it in the shade of a tree, whereupon a five-headed cobra appeared, moved the baby to a hole in the tree, and used its hood to shelter the child from the sun. Realizing it was an incarnation of the Hindu deity Vishnu, the Pulayar and his wife made offerings of milk and congee in a coconut shell. Once the king of Travancore heard of the baby, he issued orders for the construction of a temple at the location of Padmanabha swami temple.

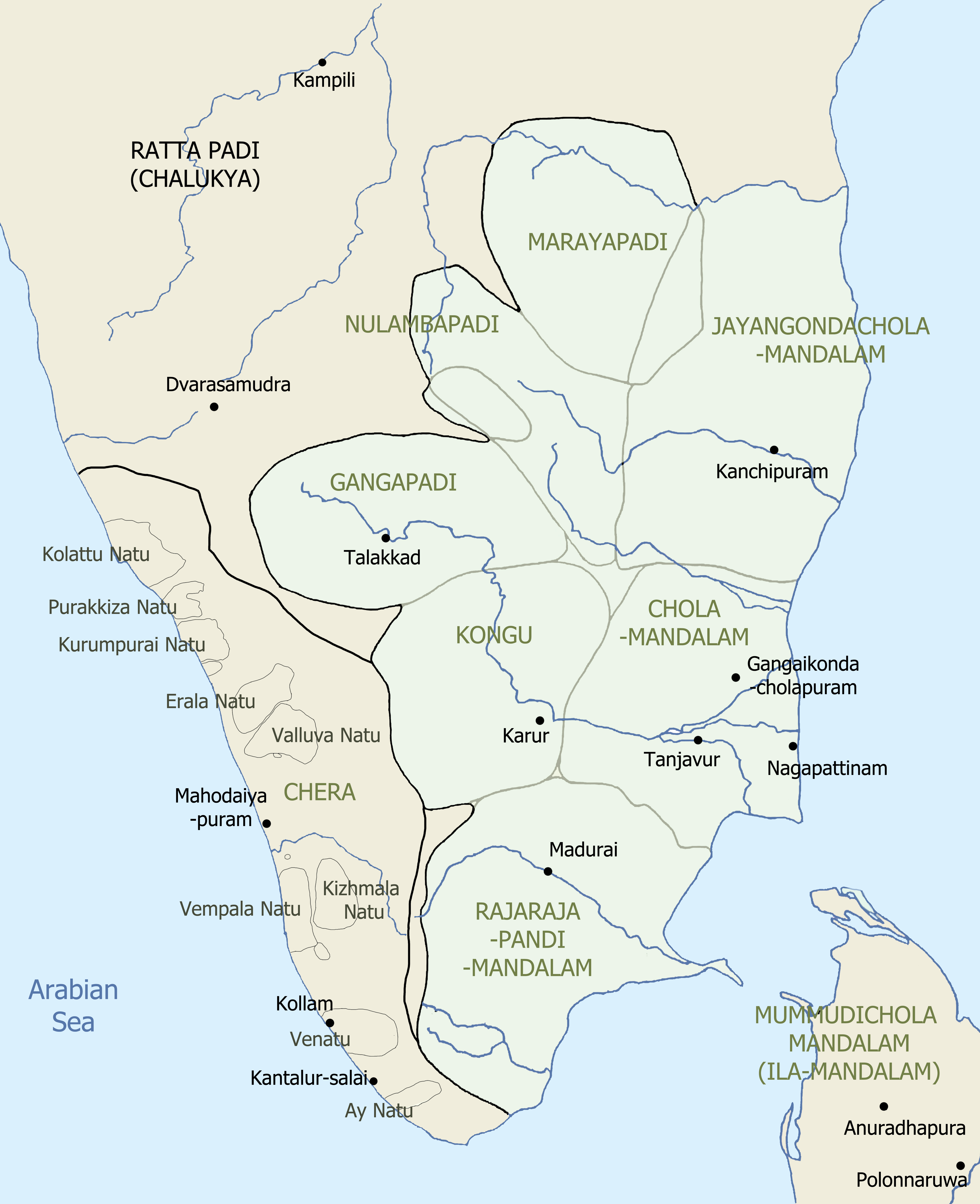
South India in early 11th century CE (around 1000 CE)

The ancient political and cultural history of the city was almost entirely independent from that of the rest of Kerala. The Chera dynasty governed the area of Malabar Coast between Alappuzha in the south to Kasaragod in the north. This includes, Palakkad Gap, Coimbatore, Erode, Salem, and Kolli Hills. The region around Coimbatore was ruled by the Cheras during Sangam period between c. 1st and the 4th centuries CE and it served as the eastern entrance to the Palakkad Gap, the principal trade route between the Malabar Coast and Tamil Nadu. However the southern region of the present-day Kerala state (The coastal belt between Thiruvananthapuram and Alappuzha) was under Ay dynasty, who was more related to the Pandya dynasty of Madurai.

Present-day Thiruvananthapuram city, district, and Kanyakumari district, were parts of Ay dynasty during ancient and medieval ages, which was a Tamil kingdom based in the southernmost part of Indian Subcontinent. Ay kingdom had experienced attacks and conquests by Cholas and Pandyas in various periods. Later, it became a part of Venad in the late Middle Ages, which was eventually expanded as the powerful kingdom of Travancore in the 18th-century CE. The Tamil-Dravidian kind of architecture is also found in the Padmanabhaswamy temple, which makes it distinct and unique from the architectural style of temples in northern parts of Kerala.

Modern-day Southern Kerala (The districts like Thiruvananthapuram, Kollam, Pathanamthitta, etc.) had been ruled by Tamil dynasties such as Ay kingdom, Pandya dynasty, and Chola dynasty, for a long time until 16th-17th century CE. The official language of Venad, based at Kollam, was also identified as Tamil, by the natives of Venad in those times. The place names, the dialects of Malayalam spoken, and the customs, those exist in Southern parts of Kerala, still reveal a close relationship with Tamil heritage. Malayalam became more prevalent with the expansion of Venad into Travancore by annexing the regions as far as present-day Ernakulam district.

The Ays was the leading political power till the beginning of the 10th century AD. During the Chera-Chola Wars from 999 to 1110 AD, the city of significance was Vizhinjam, which housed a university (Kanthalur Salai). Trivandrum housed the famous temple. All of the regions were attacked and sacked by the Chola army, till they were forced to retreat to Kottar in 1110 AD. The disappearance of the Ays synchronised with the emergence of the rulers of Venad. During the Venad rule, the trustees of the temple (Ettara Yogam) became powerful enough to challenge the authority of the rulers. Raja Aditya Varma was poisoned by them, and five out of six children of Umayamma Rani were murdered by them. In 1684, during her regency, the English East India Company obtained a sandy piece of land at Anchuthengu (Anjengo) on the sea coast, about 32 km north of Thiruvananthapuram city, for erecting a factory and fortifying it. The place had earlier been frequented by the Dutch, and later by the British East India Company. It was from here that the English gradually extended their domain to other parts of Thiruvithamcore, anglicised as Travancore.

During the regency of Umayamma Rani, Travancore was invaded by a Mughal adventurer, known as the Mughal Sirdar, forcing the Rani to take refuge in Nedumangad. The Sardar camped in the suburbs of the present-day Trivandrum, till he was defeated by Kerala Varma, a prince from the Kottayam royal family, adopted into the Venad royal family. The Rani was brought back in triumph to Trivandrum, but in 1696 AD, Kottayam Kerala Varma was assassinated by the trustees within the precincts of his palace.

During the reign of another Aditya Varma (1718–1721), the clashes between the royal officials and the temple trustees became more common. Failing to get redress at the hands of the king, the tenants of the temple lands marched to Trivandrum to present their grievances to the Yogakkar (trustees), indicating the low ebb of the power of the king.

== Modern history ==
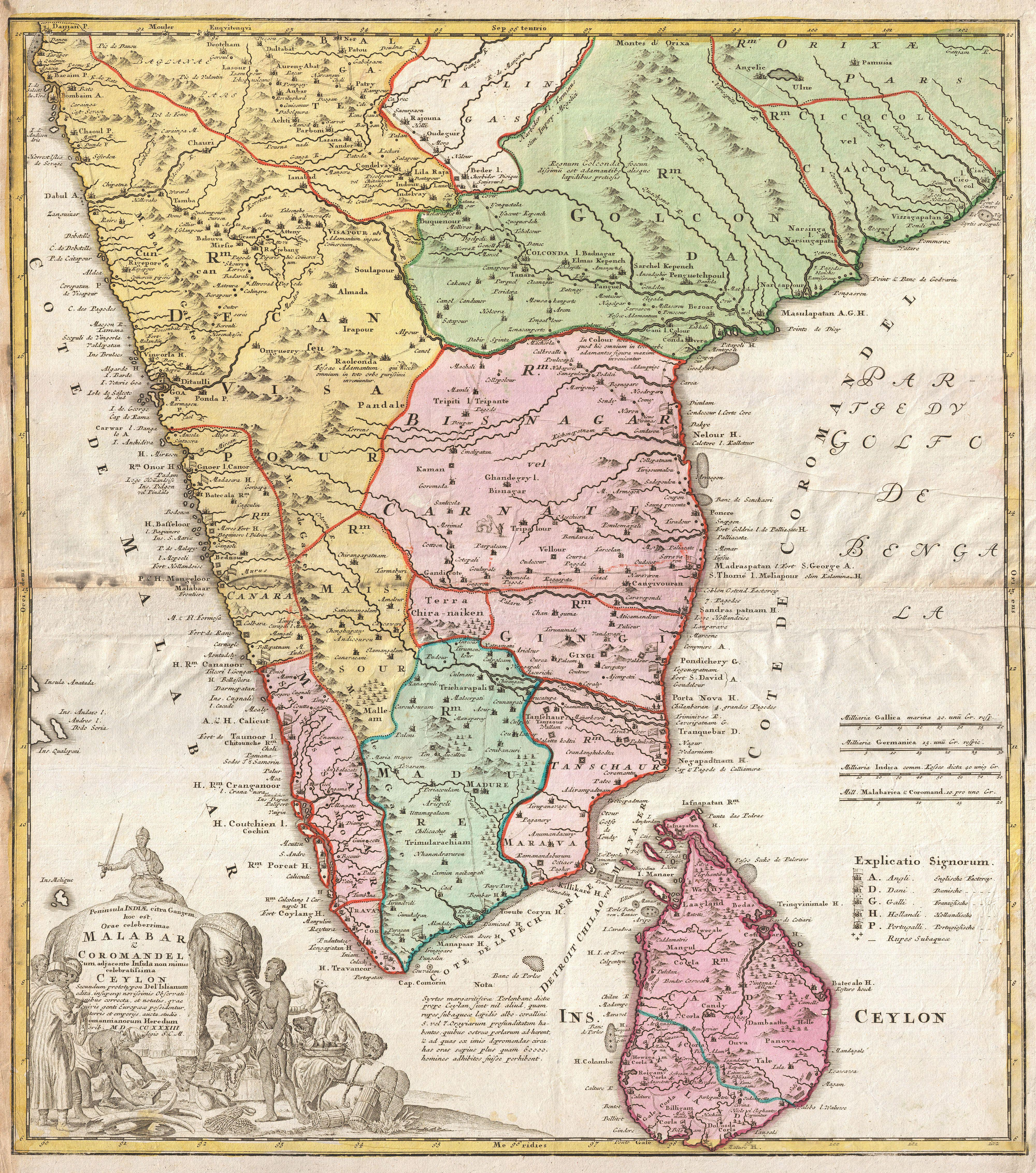
A map of Malabar Coast drawn by Homann Heirs in 1733. At that time, Travancore was only a small territory wedged between Kollam and Kanyakumari, as shown in the map (present-day districts of Trivandrum and Kanyakumari only). The vast region of Malabar Coast between Kannur and Kollam was under the control of Zamorin of Calicut then. It was in the latter half of the 18th century, that Travancore inherited the kingdoms as far as Cochin and became a powerful kingdom, and Thiruvananthapuram became a major city of Kerala.

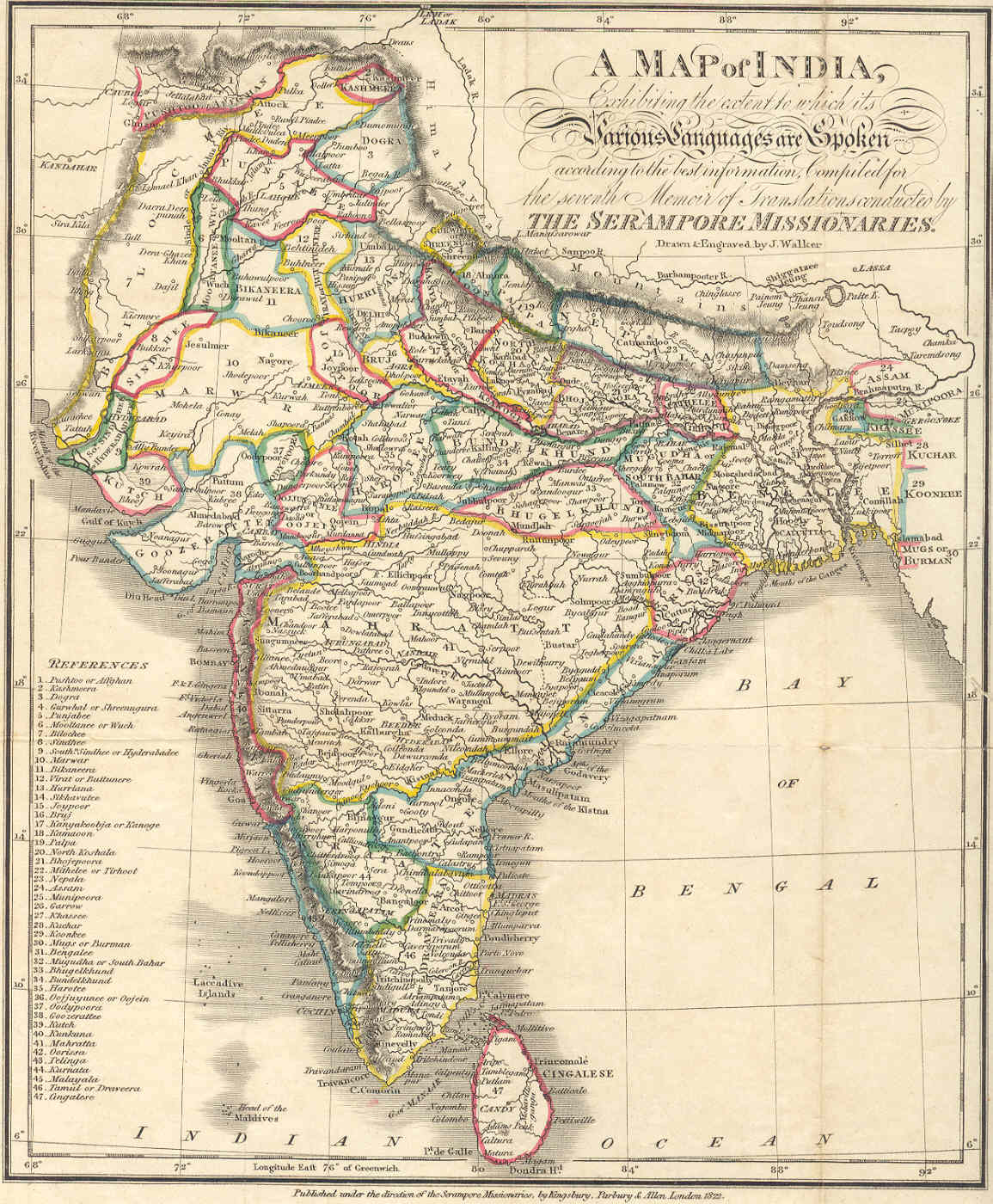
A language map of India prepared in 1822.

In the early 18th century CE, the Travancore royal family adopted some members from the royal family of Kolathunadu based at Kannur and Parappanad, based in present-day Malappuram district. Maharaja Marthanda Varma who reigned from 1729 to 1758, and who is regarded as the father of modern Travancore, modernised Thiruvananthapuram. Travancore became the most dominant state in Kerala by defeating the powerful Zamorin of Kozhikode in the battle of Purakkad in 1755. The locals of Thiruvananthapuram supported him against the Ettuveetil Pillamar and Ettara Yogam when he was the heir-apparent, and when he was attacked by the agents of the trustees, he fled to the safety of Trivandrum, from where he counterattacked. During his reign, he renovated the Padmanabhaswamy Temple and the walls of the fortress. He also shifted the capital legally from Padmanabhapuram to Thiruvananthapuram, which he made a great centre of intellectual and artistic activity. Thiruvananthapuram became a prominent city in Kerala under Marthanda Varma.

As a result of the annexation of neighboring chiefdoms, the artists and scholars from these places migrated to Trivandrum, turning it into a cultural center. Marthanda Varma gave patronage to different temple art forms including Koothu, Padhakam, Kathakali, Thullal, and Koodiyattam. Noted artists such as Ramapurathu Warrier and Kunchan Nambiar amongst others served as his court poets. In 1791, the English East India Company signed a treaty to protect Travancore from the Kingdom of Mysore and under its terms was allowed to install a Resident and troops in Thiruvananthapuram. In 1795, Thiruvananthapuram became the capital city of Travancore. In 1799, Velu Thampi Dalawa, then a Karyakar of Talakkulam, led a march of the local people to Thiruvananthapuram to protest against the corruption of the King's ministers. The accession of Maharaja Swathi Thirunal who reigned from 1829 to 1847, ushered in an epoch of cultural progress and economic prosperity. The beginning of English education was marked in 1834 by the opening of an English school at Thiruvananthapuram. An observatory and a charity hospital were also established in 1836. During the reign of Maharaja Uthram Thirunal, Rev. Mead, an Anglican priest of the London Missionary Society (L.M.S.), was employed by the Maharajah to improve the quality of education. Schools, including one for girls, were started in Thiruvananthapuram.

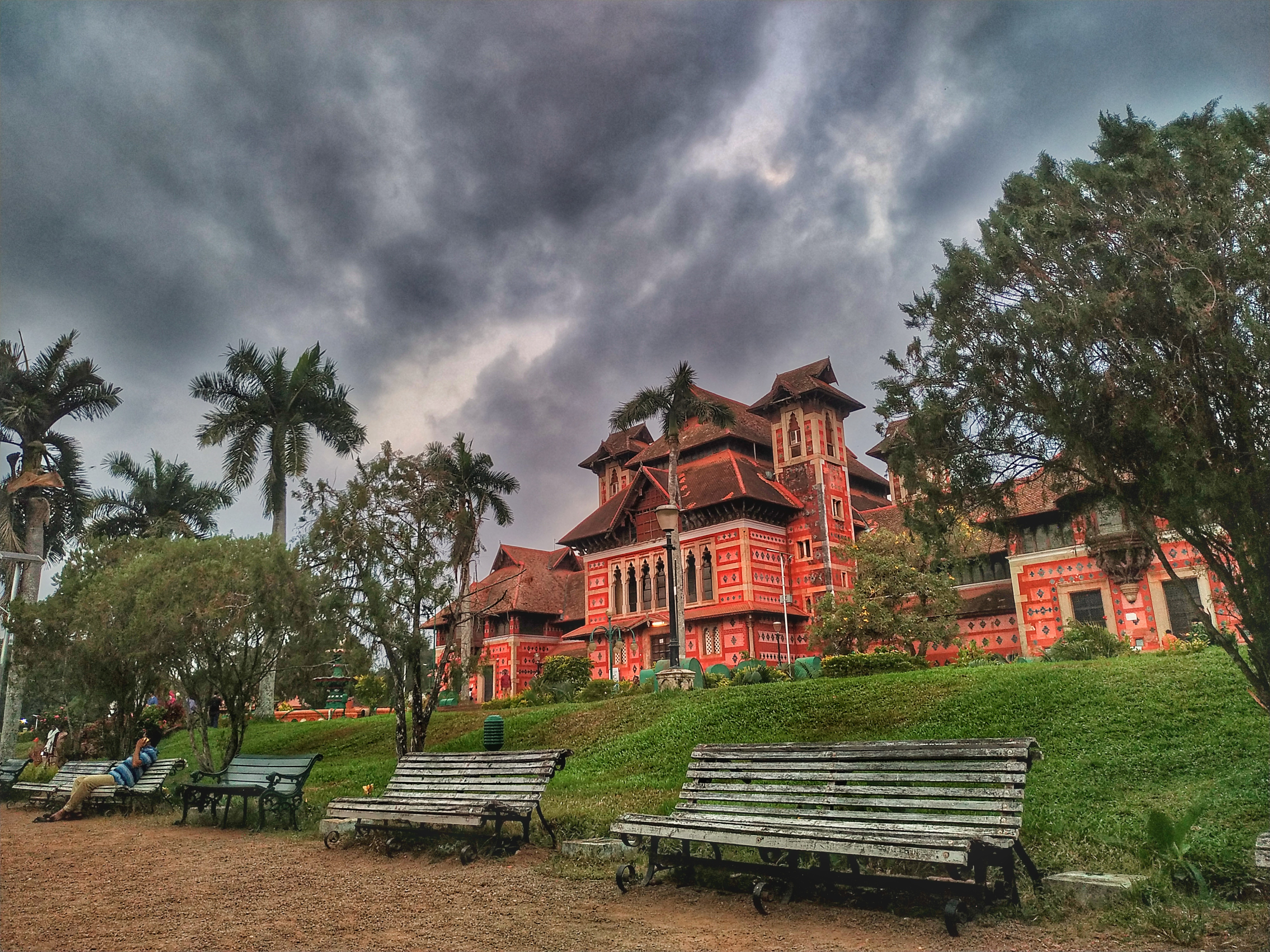
The Napier Museum was established in 1855.

During the reign of Maharaja Moolam Thirunal (1885–1924), a College of Fine Arts was opened here besides the several English, Malayalam and Tamil schools, all over the State. A large hospital with lying-in-facility and a lunatic asylum were also established in Thiruvananthapuram. The Trivandrum University College was started in 1873, with Dr. Read as its principal. A Law class was opened in Thiruvananthapuram in 1874, and the main building of the old Kerala Government Secretariat was designed and constructed by the Maharajah's chief engineer, Mr. Barton. Mr. Barton also improved the sanitation of the city. During the reign of Sri Moolam Thirunal (1885–1924), the Sanskrit College, Ayurveda College, Law College, and a second-grade College for Women were started here. A department for the preservation and publication of oriental manuscripts was also established.

One of the significant aspects associated with Maharaja Sree Moolam Thirunal's reign was the inauguration of the Legislative Council in 1888. This was the first legislative chamber, instituted in an Indian State. The Sri Moolam Assembly came into being in 1904. The activities of the Indian National Congress echoed in Thiruvananthapuram and other parts of Kerala during the reign of Maharaja Sree Moolam Thirunal. The Thiruvananthapuram Municipality came into existence in 1920 as the first municipality in Travancore region. After two decades, during the reign of Sree Chithira Thirunal, Thiruvananthapuram Municipality was converted into a Corporation on 30 October 1940.

During the regency of Maharani Setu Lakshmi Bai, the college for Women at Trivandrum was raised to the first grade.

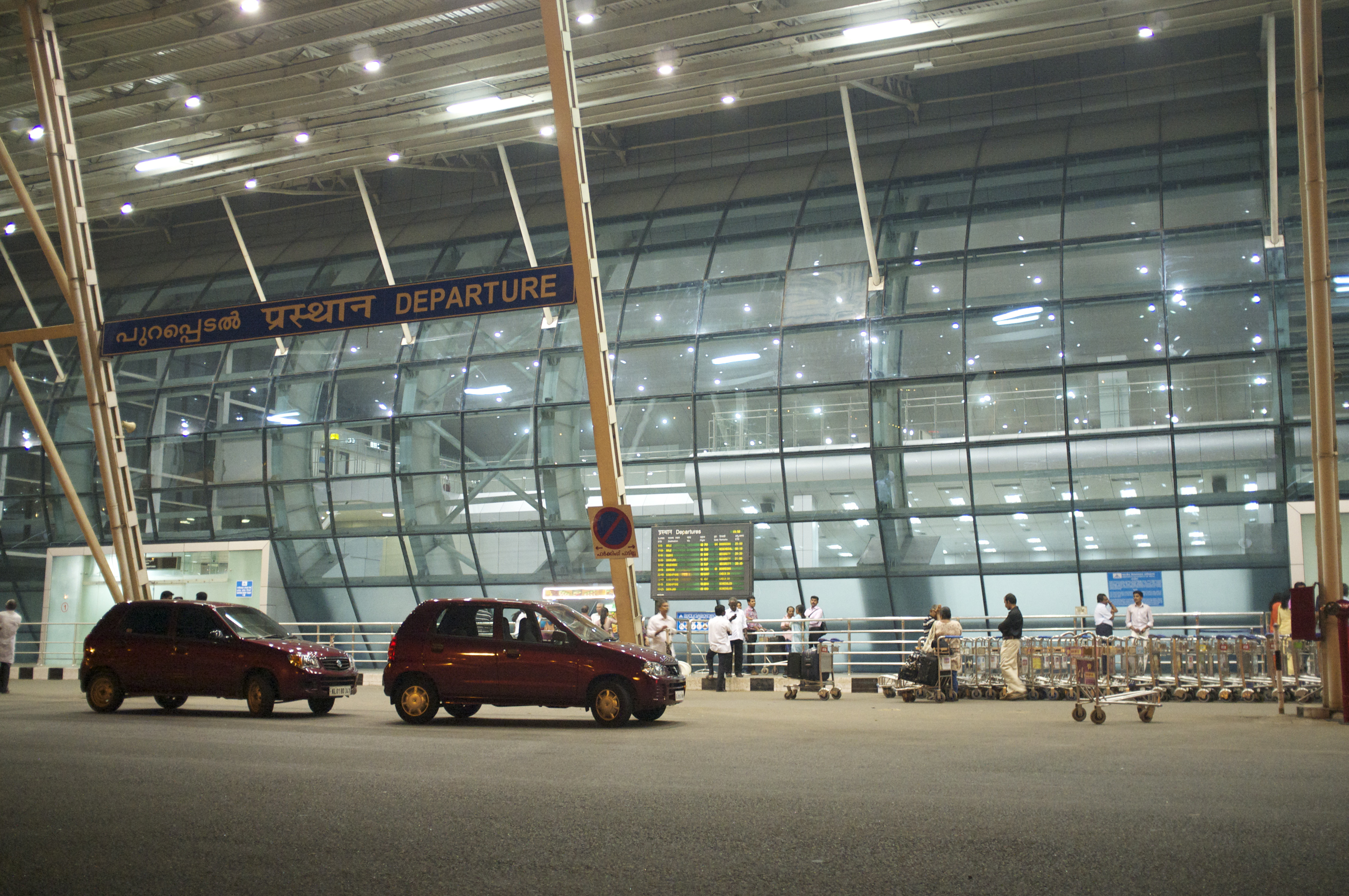
The Trivandrum International Airport was established in 1932

A political conference of the Congress was held in the city under the presidency of Dr. Pattabhi Sitaramaiah, in 1938. The period of Maharaja Sri Chitra Thirunal Bala Rama Varma who took the reins of administration in 1931, witnessed many-sided progress. The promulgation of the Temple Entry Proclamation (1936) was an act that underlined social emancipation. In 1937, a separate University for Travancore was started. That was later redesignated as the University of Kerala, following the formation of the State of Kerala in 1956.

== Post-Independence (1947 CE - present) ==
With the end of the British rule in 1947, Travancore chose to join the Indian Union. The first people-elected ministry headed by Pattom Thanu Pillai was installed in office on 24 March 1948. In 1949, Thiruvananthapuram became the capital of Thiru-Kochi, the state formed by the integration of Travancore with its northern neighbor Kochi. The king of Travancore, Chitra Thirunal Bala Rama Varma, became the Rajpramukh of the Travancore-Cochin Union from 1 July 1949 until 31 October 1956. When the state of Kerala was formed on 1 November 1956, Thiruvananthapuram became its capital.

With the establishment of Thumba Equatorial Rocket Launching Station (TERLS) in 1962, Thiruvananthapuram became the cradle of India's ambitious space program. The first Indian space rocket was developed and launched from the Vikram Sarabhai Space Centre (VSSC) in the outskirts of the city in 1963. Several establishments of the Indian Space Research Organisation (ISRO) were later established in Thiruvananthapuram.

A significant milestone in the city's recent history was the establishment of Technopark—India's first IT park—in 1995. Technopark has developed into the largest IT park in the geographical area, employing around 40,000 people in 300 companies.
