= K. P. Parameswaran =

Kodunthirapully Parameswaran
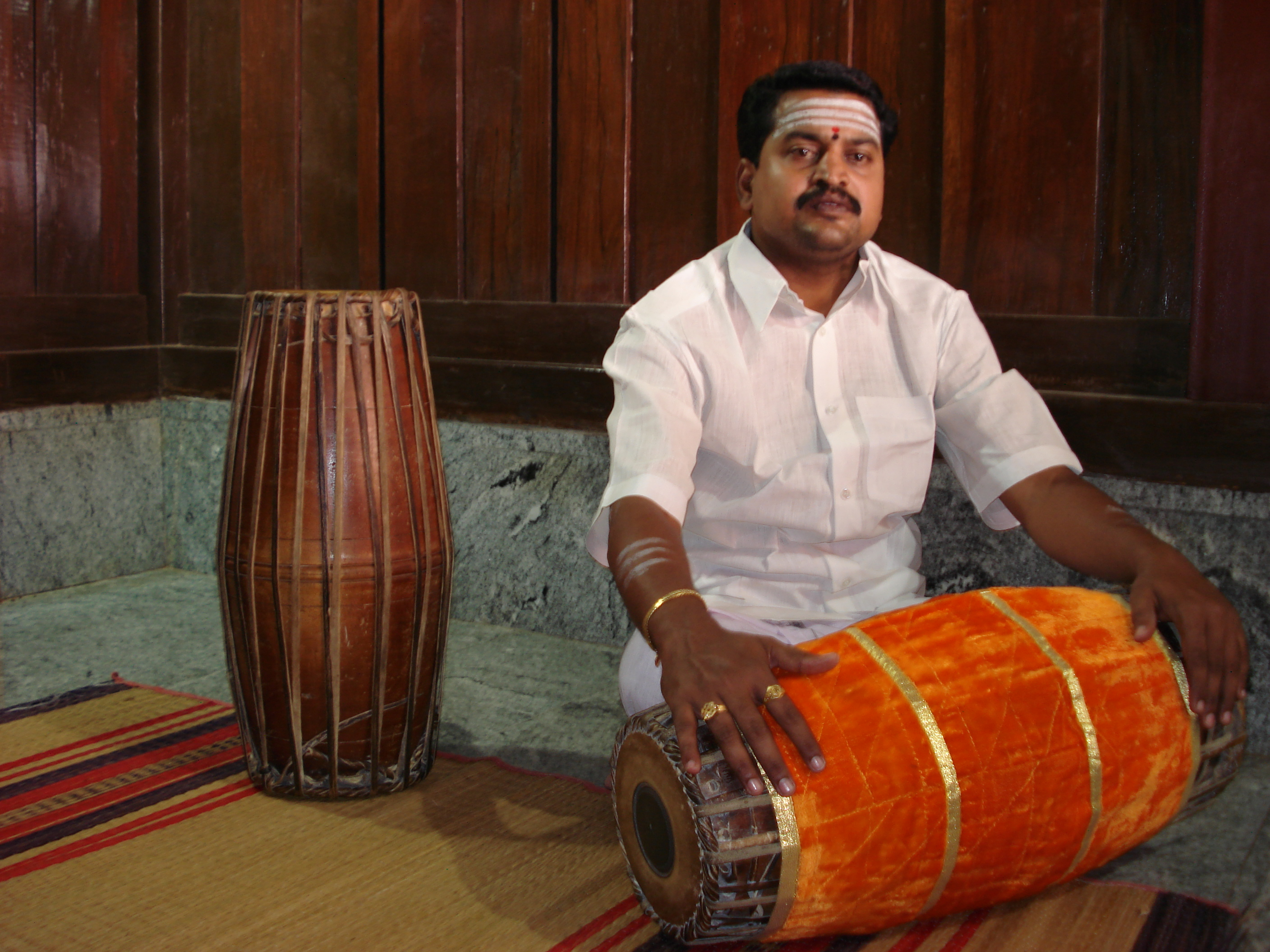

Background information
- Born: 17 July 1969 (age 57); Palakkad, Kerala, India
- Genres: Carnatic Music, Carnatic Instrumentalists
- Instruments: Mridangam, Konakkol
- Years active: 1980–present
- Website: kpparameswaran.wix.com/home

K. P. Parameswaran (Kodunthirapully Parameswaran) (Malayalam: കെ.പി.പരമേശ്വരന്‍ (കൊടുന്തിരപ്പുള്ളി പരമേശ്വരന്‍))(Tamil: கே.பி.பரமேஸ்வரன் (கொடுந்திறப்புள்ளி பரமேஸ்வரன்)) is a professional mridangam artiste (AIR 'A' Grade Artiste).He is a prime disciple of Sangeetha Kalanidhi Dr.T.K.Murthy. He has performed all over India and abroad with various stalwarts of Carnatic Music. He is a torch bearer of the Thanjavur style of mridangam playing.

== Early life ==
K. P. Parameswaran was born on 17 July 1969 to Late K.S.Padmanabha Iyer and K.P.Lokanayaki in Kodunthirapully Village, Palakkad, Kerala. He was initiated to the mridangam by his grandfather Late Sri Kodunthirapully Swaminatha Iyer, who himself was a great mridangam artist who was a disciple of K.Ponnaiah Pillai, Thanjavur Vaidyanatha Iyer and Palghat Mani Iyer. Parameswaran had rigorous training under his grandfather in mridangam. He then went to Mridangam Legend Sangeetha Kalanidhi Dr T.K.Murthy for the higher studies in mridangam in 1987. He had Gurukulavasam Training under Dr T.K.Murthy for 15 years (1987-2002).

== Career ==
He completed Ganabhushanam Course under Sri Parassala Ravi in Palakkad Music College. While under the guidance of Dr T.K.Murthy, he played many double mridangam concerts and mridangam demonstrations with his teacher and adopted the same style as his guru in both accompanying for the songs and in the solo performances. During that time, he was awarded the central government scholarship for his talent in mridangam and for training under Dr. T.K. Murthy. He has also played in the commercially released CD named 35 Thalas, 72 Mela Kartha Thalas & 108 Thalas, produced by his Guru, Dr. T.K. Murthy. He has accompanied many stalwarts during his career. Some of the musicians he has accompanied are listed below.

- Sri. K.V. Narayanaswamy
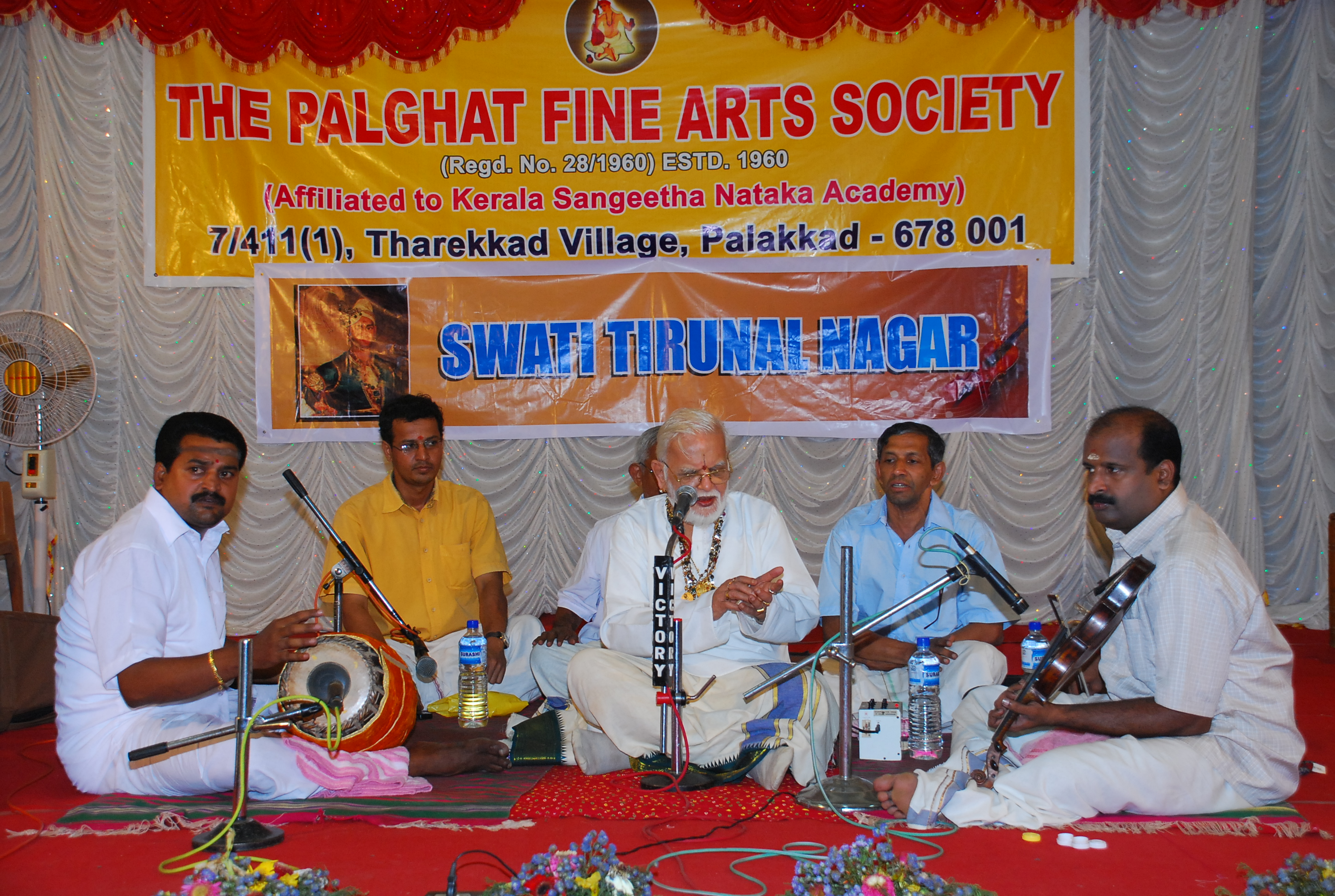
  Accompanying Sri T.K.Govinda Rao
- Sri. B. Rajam Iyer
- Sri. T.K Govinda Rao
- Sri. M.S. Gopalakrishnan
- Sri. Madurai T.N. Seshagopalan
- Sri. T.V. Sankara Narayanan
- Sri. Thrissur V. Ramachandran
- Smt. Radha Viswanathan
- Smt. Suguna Purushothaman
- Smt. Suguna Varadachari
- Smt. M.S.Sheela
- Smt. Panthula Rama
- Sri. Neyveli Santhanagopalan
- Sri. Karaikudi Subramaniam
- Sri. Vijay Shiva
- Sri. Lalgudi G.J.R. Krishnan
- Sri. Trichy Ganeshan
- Sri. Sanjay Subramanyam
- Sri. T.M. Krishna
- Sri. T.N.S. Krishna
- Sri. Ashok Ramani
- Sri. Kadri Gopalnath
- Sri. Mandolin Srinivas
- Pandit Ronu Majumdar

He is an 'A' Graded artist of All India Radio (AIR). He is a torch bearer of the Thanjavur style of Mridangam playing. Apart from playing he is also a mridangam teacher. He has many number of disciples who are already prominent in the field.

== Awards and titles ==
Kodunthirapully Parameswaran is awarded with many titles.

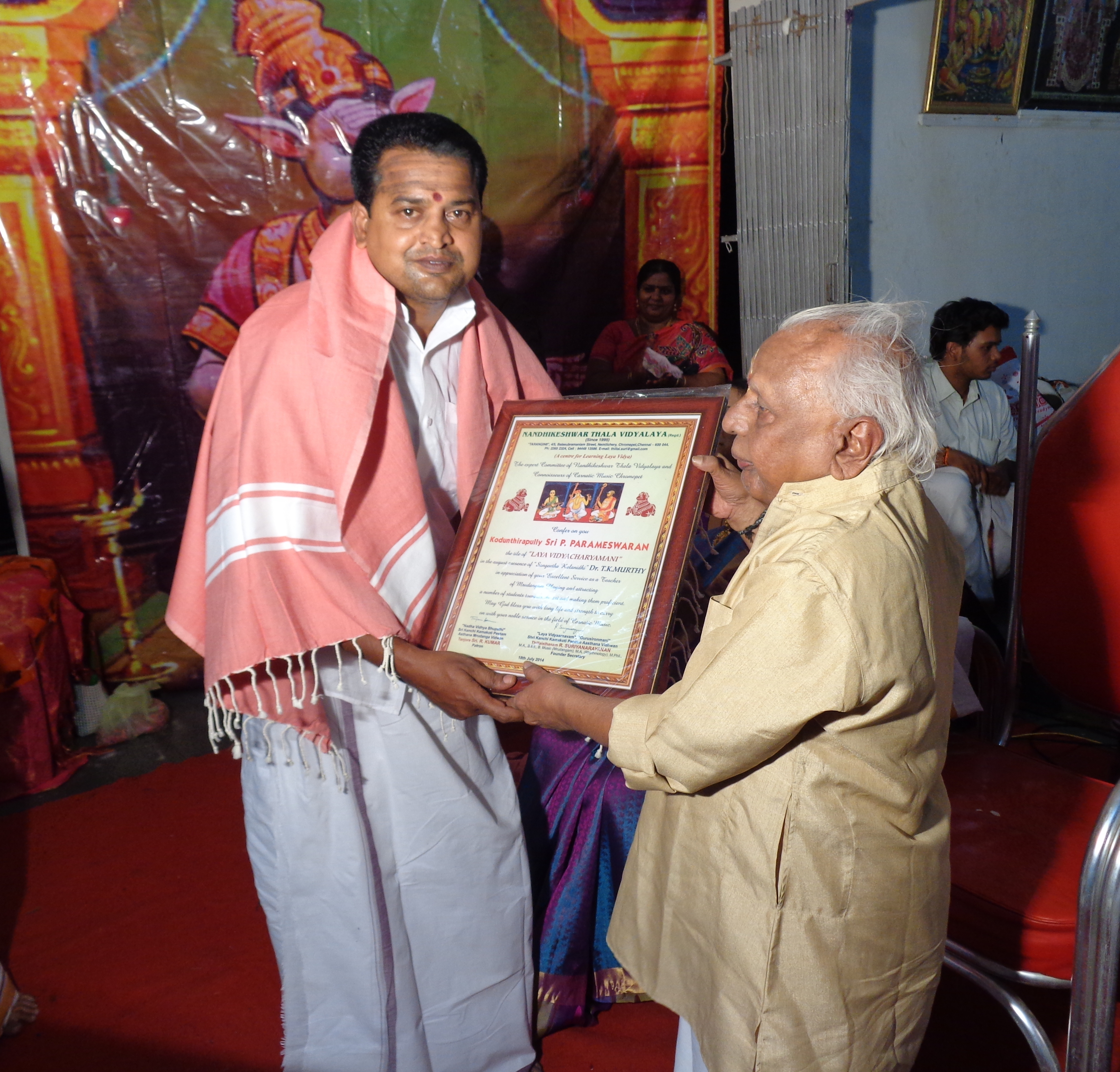
Receiving the Title "Laya Vidhyacharya Mani" From Dr.T.K.Murthy

- Asthana Vidwan By Kanchi Kamakoti Peetham
- Sangeetha Thilakam By Thirvambadi Devaswom, Thrissur
- Laya Vadya Nipuna By Kerala Brahmana Sabha
- Laya Vidhyacharya Mani By Nandhikeshwar Thala Vidyalaya, Chrompet, Chennai
