= Parameswaran Nair =

Parameswaran Nair is a surname. Notable people with the surname include:

- P. K. Parameswaran Nair (1903-1988), indian biographer, critic, essayist and literary historian
- Edappal Ponnamkuzhi Veettil Parameswaran Sukumaran Nair (1948-1997), indian actor and producer
- V. Parameswaran Nair (fl. 1976–1983), indian physicist
