= V. N. Parameswaran Pillai =

Maj Gen V.N. Parameswaran Pillai OBE (Velayudhan Pillai Narayana Pillai Parameswaran Pillai) was the last GOC of the Travancore Nair Army. He took command in 1945 and oversaw the partial absorption of the Travancore Army in to the Indian Army. He was allowed to retire in 1949, when the unified Travancore-Cochin forces were disbanded. He is best remembered as a resourceful soldier who was meticulous in maintaining the decorum and formalities.

Sri. Pillai was born in Arayoor, Neyyattinkara Taluk. He didn't receive much of formal English education, and therefore first joined the Travancore Nair Army as a Sepoy. But through his hard-work, he achieved an enviable educational background and at the same time, rose through the ranks of the army, finally becoming the GOC. His subordinates affectionately called him GOC Kuttan Pillai. He remains as the only officer from the TNA to receive the Order of the British Empire honour from the Queen.
