= Mathumoola =

- city
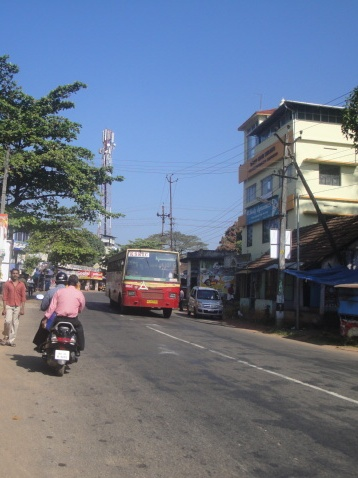
- M.C.Road at Mathumoola
- Interactive map of Mathumoola
- Coordinates: 9.466667°N 76.55°E
- Country: India
- State: Kerala
- District: Kottayam

Population (2001)
  - Total: 51,960

Languages
  - Official: Malayalam, English
- Time zone: UTC+5:30 (IST)
- PIN: 686103
- Telephone code: +91 481
- Vehicle registration: KL-33
- Sex ratio: 48:52 ♂/♀
- Wonderful tourist spot

Mathumoola is a part of Changanacherry Taluk in Kottayam District. It is a junction on National Highway 183 (MC Road). The Vazhappally Temple Road and the Morkulangara Bypass Junction Road intersect here. Mathumoola is a part of Vazhappally in Changanacherry town. Changanassery town about 1.5 km from Mathumala junction. The nearest railway station is Changanassery which is 2 km away and about 17 km from Kottayam.

== Origin of Name ==
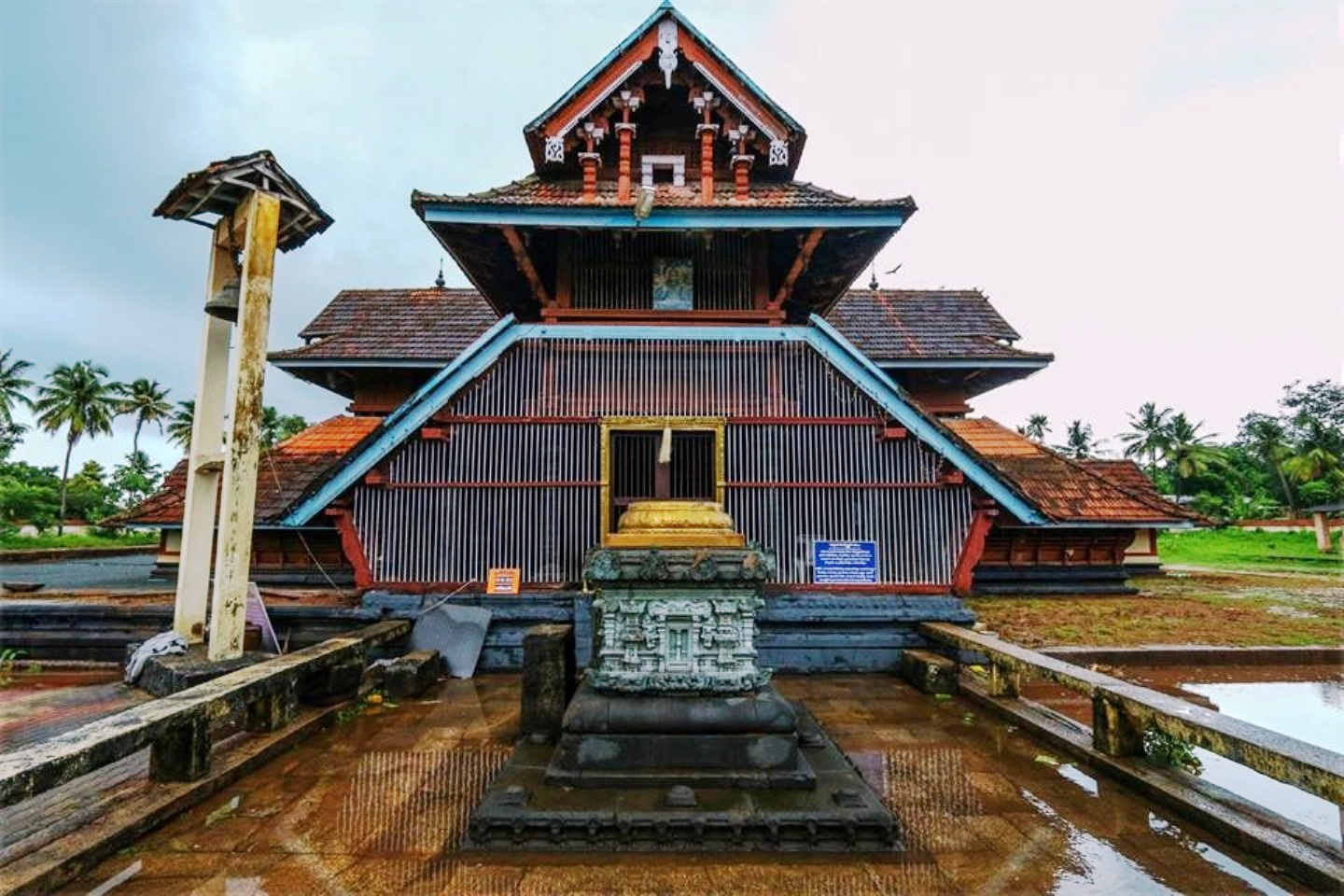
Vazhappally_Temple

During the Thekkumkoor Dynasty, the huge wall that was built for the protection of the Vazhappally Maha Siva Temple extended to Mathumoola. The Changanassery War, which took place in September 1750, after the extinction of the Vazhappally Pathillathil Pottimar (Brahmins from ten Houses), Thekkumkoor lost its dominance and caused considerable damage to the Vazhappally Temple wall. The place was later known as "Mathil Moola" (Wall Corner) and later, the Mathumoola.

== Demographics ==
Population is evenly divided between Hindus and Christians and a little Muslims.

== Economy ==
People in Mathumoola is purely depends on Changanacherry market and town for their lively goods to buy.

== Schools ==
Schools
Vazhappally Government Higher Secondary School
St.Teresa's Higher Secondary School, Vazhappally

== See also ==
- Changanacherry
- Vazhappally
