= Thekkumkur =

Kingdom in Kerala from 1103 to 1750

Kingdom of Thekkumkur തെക്കുംകൂർ
- 1103–1750
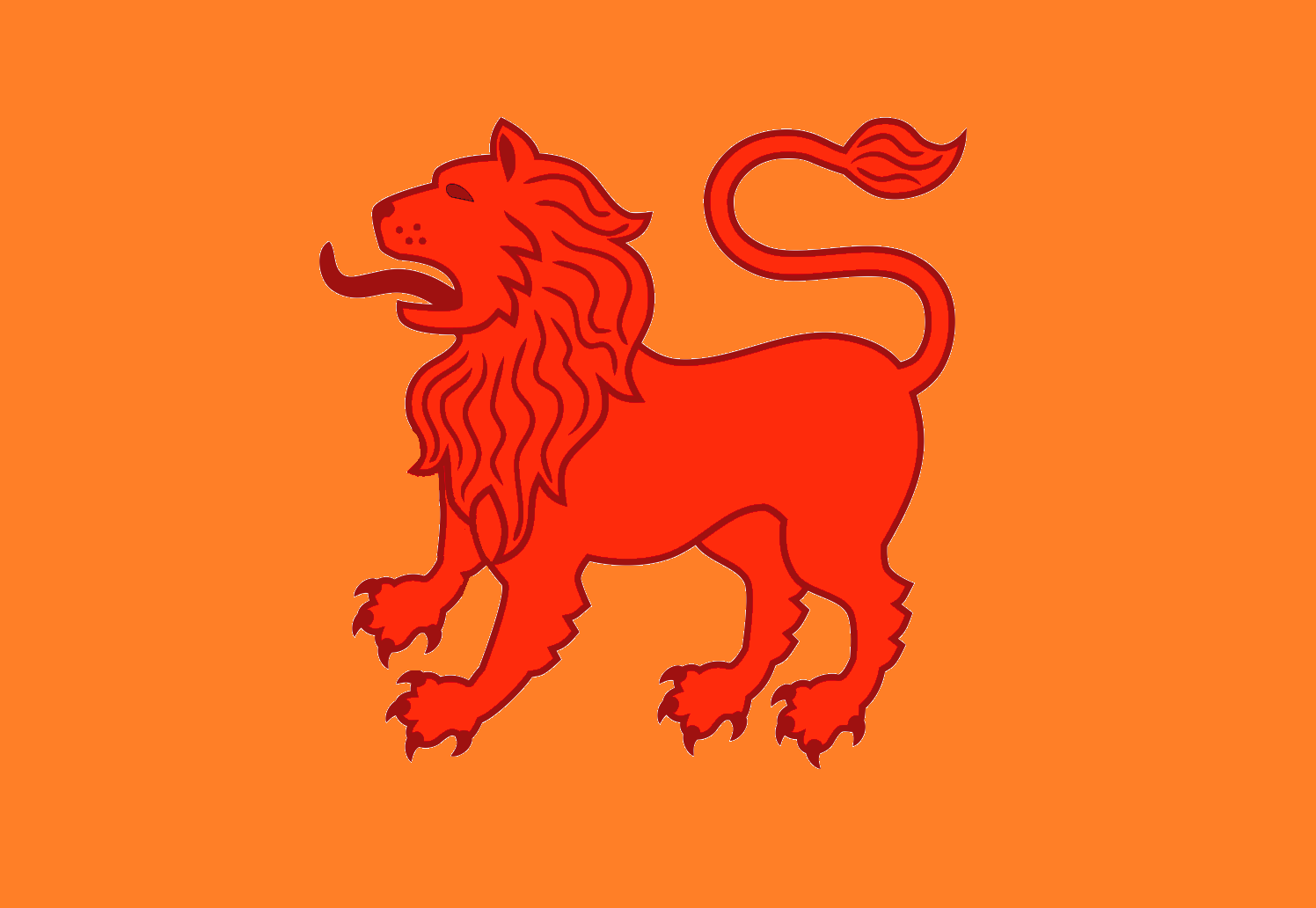
- Flag
- Status: Princely State of Kerala
- Capital: Vennimala & Manikandapuram (1100~1445); Changanassery & Thaliyanthanapuram (1445-1750)
- Common languages: Malayalam & Tamil
- Religion: Hinduism
- Government: Monarchy
- Manikandanmar
  - 1710–1750: Aditya Varma
- Historical era: Age of Imperialism
  - Established: 1103
  - The Battle of Changanassery: 1749
  - Disestablished: 1750
Preceded by	Succeeded by
Vempolinad	Travancore
- Today part of: India

The Kingdom of Thekkumkur (Malayalam: തെക്കുംകൂർ രാജ്യം) (also transliterated as Thekkumkoor or Thekkumcore) was an independent kingdom in the southern part of Kerala in India from 1103 CE until 1750 CE. It was ruled by the Thekkumkur Royal Family (Edathil Family). Thekkumkur lies between the Meenachil River and the Pamba River, from the Western Ghats to the Vembanad Kayal. Thekkumkur emerged as a result of administrative changes in the princely states at the end of the Chera Kulasekhara dynasty of Mahodayapuram. The literal meaning of the title is the southern regent and the attribute southern distinguished them from another kingdom known as Vadakkumkur (northern regent) which bordered it in the northern side. The royal household, Thekkumkur Kovilakam, were at Vennimala and Manikandapuram near Puthuppally, later it shifted to Neerazhi Palace at Puzhavathu of Changanassery and Thalilkotta at Thaliyanthanapuram (Kottayam).

== History ==
=== End of Kulasekhara Empire ===
Thekkumkur emerges as a result of administrative changes in the princely states at the end of the Kulasekhara Empire at the end of the 11th century. The feudal forms emerged as a result of the Brahmin's authority to acquire the physical rights of the land through the expansion of tiles and the influence of the slums which were the agricultural land. Smaller feudal lords subordinated themselves to the dynasties like Vempolinad. Due to the increase in the geographical area, Vempolinad was partitioned into two princely states called Thekkumkur and Vadakkumkur. The northern parts of Vembalanad were transformed into Vadakkumkur, and the southern parts of Vembalanad were merged with Munjunad and Nantuzhainad and formed Thekkumkur. There is no disagreement among historians as to what might have happened in the first decade of the twelfth century. However, there are some indications that the ritual had begun before that and the century before. Only that it was not transformed into an absolute monarchy of Thekkumkur kingdom.

=== Origin ===
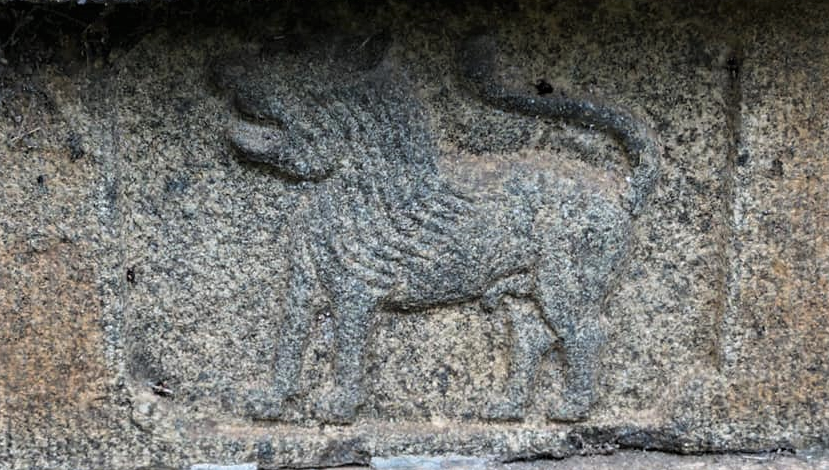
Royal seal of Thekkumkur Dynasty engraved in stone (Punchaman Illom, Vennimala)

Ilaya Raja (Prince) of Vempolinad who lived in Vemballi palace (Malayalam: വെമ്പള്ളി കൊട്ടാരം) founded Thekkumkur kingdom at the beginning of the 12th century. After their separation, Thekkumkur became an independent kingdom, while Vadakkumkur became a vassal of Cochin. The northern parts of Vempolinad were transformed into Vadakkumkur, and the southern parts of Vempolinad were merged with Nantuzhunad and Munjunad and formed Thekkumkur in AD 1103. Vennimala was chosen as the headquarters of the Thekkumkur monarchy because the Thekkumkur king was the koyil authority of the Venimala Sree Rama Lakshmana Perumal Temple which was supposed to have been founded by Bhaskara Ravi Varma-II (1019–1021).

=== Initial Capital - Vennimala and Manikandapuram ===
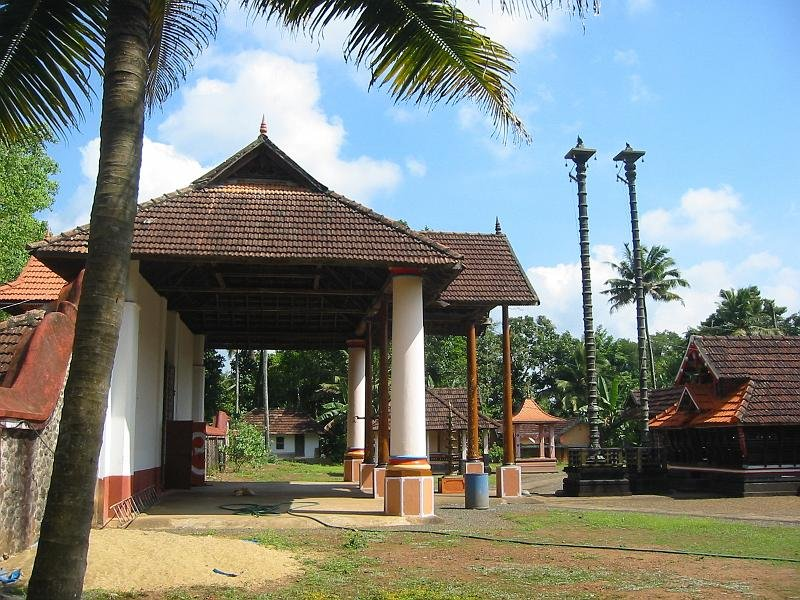
Sree Rama Lakshmana Perumal Temple, Vennimala

Vennimala was established as the headquarters of Thekkumkur kingdom. Vennimala was the most secure place for the enemy. The forests were cut down and developed into habitable areas and the administration is strengthened by the capital city of Manikandapuram. The Manikandapuram Krishna temple is believed to have been built by King Iravi Manikandan in 1152 AD. Manikandapuram and adjoining areas flourished with the administrative and populace necessary for capital. During the rule of the Thekkumkur kings, Manikandapuram was a very flourishing town. There is evidence that the fort and the tunnels were at Manikandapuram, as were the later headquarters of the Thekkumkur monarchy at Changanassery and Thaliyanthanapuram (Kottayam).

=== Changanassery and Thaliyanthanapuram ===
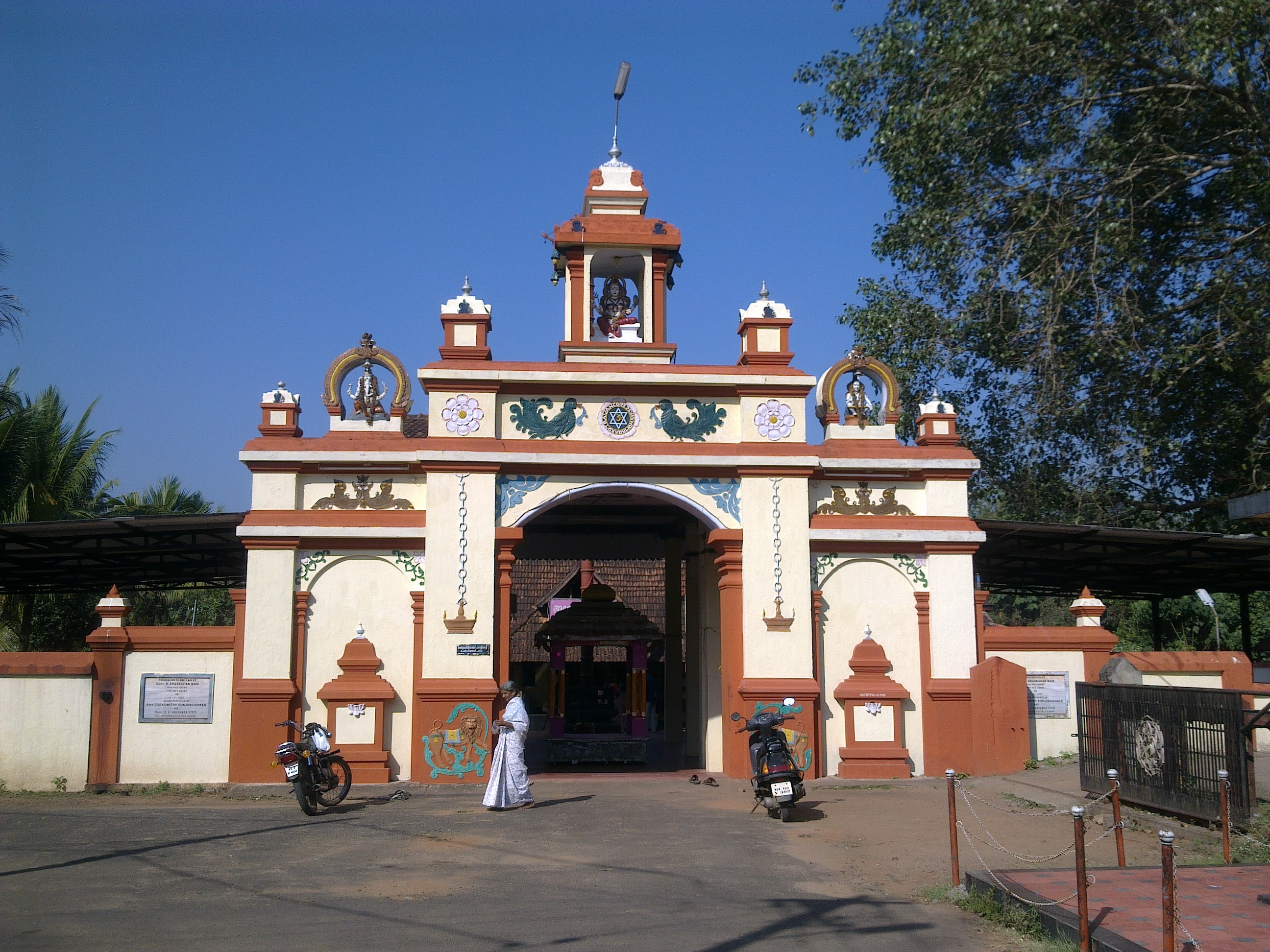
Thekkumkur Paradevatha (Edathil Bhagavathy) Temple at Puzhavathu

As part of the growth of the market hubs in idanadu (medieval places), it was an intellectual move to have good interventions in the kingdom, the capital shifted to Puzhavathu in Changanassery at the beginning of 15th century. Apart from trade, Thekkumkur has promoted Changanassery as the best town for transportation in the southern neighboring princely states of Kerala. The administrative center remained in the Neerazhi Palace of Changanassery for the next three and a half centuries. The relocation of the headquarters to Neerazhikettu Kottaram at Changanassery made it easier for them to ease the commodities that frequent the Vembanadu lagoon and to combat the encroachments of the backwaters of Chempakassery.

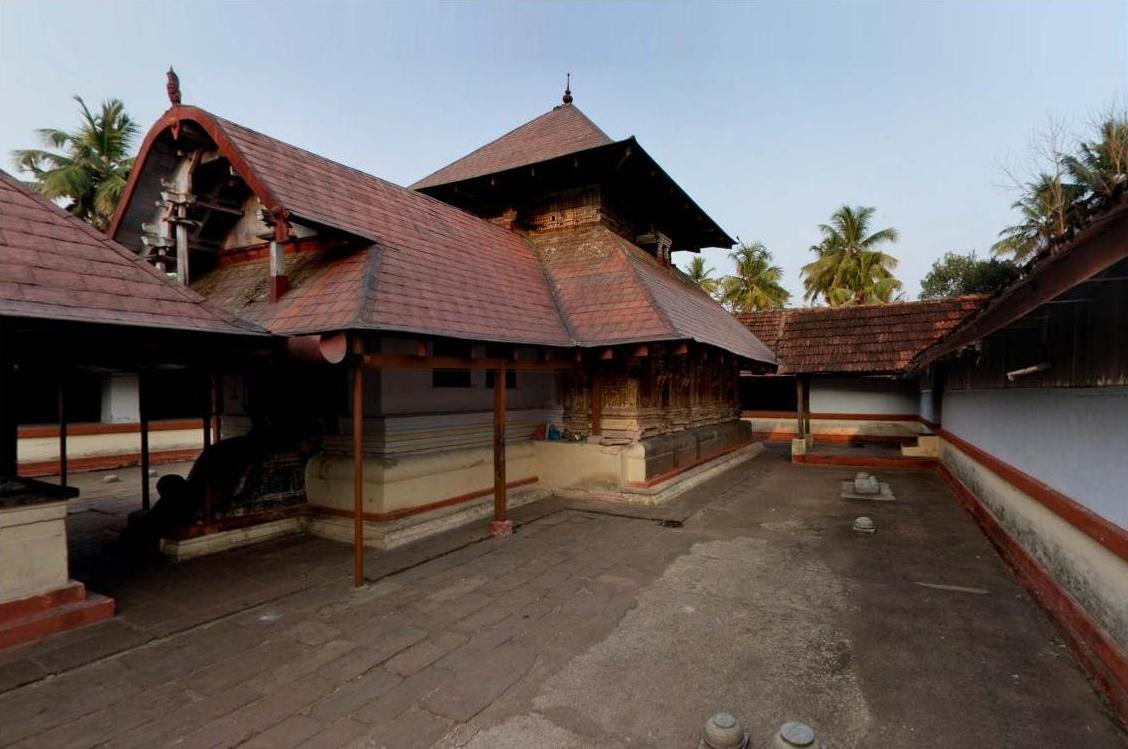
Thali Temple, Thalikotta (Thaliyanthanapuram)

By the end of the 15th century, the Thekkumur kings had built a palace and fort near the Thaliyil temple and established another capital on the banks of the river Meenachil at Thalianthanapuram (Kottayam). Thali Temple was one of the eighteen and a half Thali shrines (Malayalam: പതിനെട്ടര തളികൾ) of Kerala. An additional capital city establishment was by the trade developments in the Thazhathangadi river (Meenachil River) and the collapse of the ancient thali (Malayalam: തളി) as a center of Brahmanism. The fort, which was about a kilometer in circumference and was about 12 feet high, was made of heavy red sandstone and had six bastions (the tower of view) and five-meters (seven Kol) wide trenches.

== Geography ==
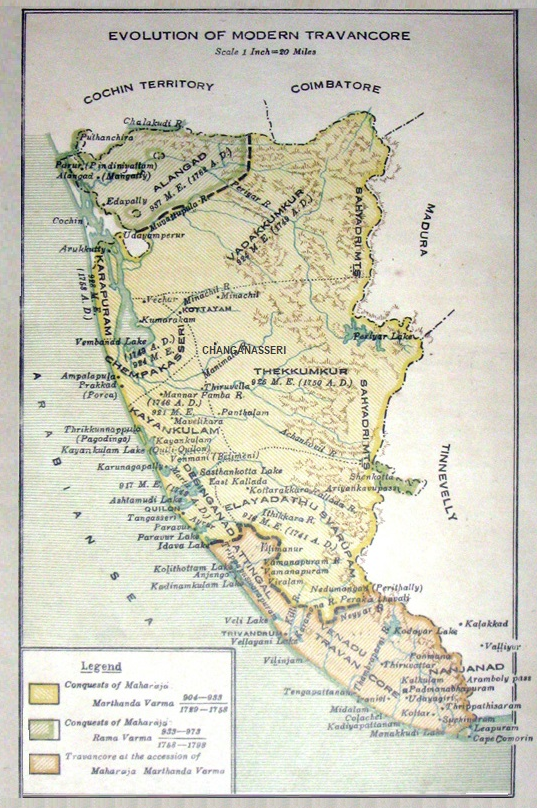
Map of Thekkumkur (1498) By Dutch Rev.Samuel Mateer

An earthen fort along the border of Vadakkumkoor and Thekkumkoor, it beginning from Athirampuzha, it extended to Kondur (east of Pala, Kerala). Initially, the Thekkumkur boundary was the Western Ghats (Sahyadri Mountains) to the Vembanadu Lake (Vembanadu Kayal) and the Kanakkary to Kaipattoor (Kadavu) in Achankovil River. In the late 18th century, however, the area of the kingdom declined. As a Dutch map of AD1743 indicates, the boundaries are;

- West: Vembanadu Lake; Place includes: Kumarakom, Eara, Neelamperoor, Kidangara, Muttar, Neerettupuram, Niranam
- South: Place includes: Budhanur, Puliyur, Parumala, Chengannur, Aranmula, Kozhencherry, Ayirur, Ranni, Kerala
- East: Place includes: Mukkoottuthara, Erumeli, Kannimala, Chotty, Thidanad, Meenachil
- North: Place includes: Pala, Kerala, Lalam, Koodallur, Kanakkary, Athiranpuzha

Historian K.N Gopala Pillai, Kuruppum Veettil is written of the country's borders in his historical novel "Thekkumkur Rani". He said that Purakkad belonged to Thekkumur and was an important trading center of the country.

== Separation of Poonjar Provinance ==
It is believed that a branch of the Pandyan dynasty who had to flee in the 12th century after a dispute over Madurai; later sold their possessions and established a kingdom. Pandya king, Manavikrama Kulasekhara Perumal who came from Madurai and later settled in Ettumanur. Udaya Kulasekara of the Pandya dynasty was revealed the locals the intent of the robbers who came to loot Ettumanur Siva temple in the early 15th century. In the congregation that followed Udaya Kulasekara Perumal of Pandya king made the covenant with Kotha Varman Manikandan of Thekkumkur in AD 1419 at Thaliyanthanapuram. Thekkumkur king summoned the local governing councils and locals at Thaliyil Temple to understand their minds about the covenant. According to the covenant with Kotha Varman and Manavikraman of Pandya dynasty; the Poonjar kingdom was acquired by giving a certain amount of gold and undefined emeralds to the Thekkumkur This is a treaty document on the rise of the Poonjar kingdom. KP Padmanabha Menon writes in the Malabar histories about the authentic account of the country exchange treaties held at the Mukha mandapam of Thaliyil Siva temple.

The Poonjar Covenant	പൂഞ്ഞാർ ഉടമ്പടി
Tekkuṅkūr svarūpattiṅkaninnuṁ pūññāṟṟil perumāḷkk maññamala periyār uḷppeṭa malampiṟaṁ eḻuti keāṭuttatāvit. keāllaṁ 594 (AD1419) makaraṁ ñāyaṟil pūññār udayakulaśēkharapperumāḷ paṇṭārattilēykk veṇpala nāṭṭuṭaya kēātavarm'man kēāviladhikārikaḷ maññamala periyār malampiṟattinatir. kiḻakk kaṇṇam'mēṭṭinuṁ talakkuḷatt mēṭṭinuṁ nētākara mēṭṭinuṁ vaḻukkappāṟa mēṭṭinuṁ talamala kiḻakkēāṭṭ cāññatinuṁ mēkkuttekk vaḻukkappāṟaykkuṁ mullaykkuṁ pēraṭa pāṟattēāṭṭinuṁ tēvarakkuḷatt mēṭṭinuṁ cēāṟṟippāṟaykkuṁ kūṭṭikkalkkuṁ mēkkuvaṭakk mannammuṭṭikkuṁ kunnēāmmuṟikkuṁ kuṭamuruṭṭimalaykkuṁ mār malaykkuṁ periyal malaykkuṁ pēāḻākkallinuṁ oru tarattilāṇ cāññanēāṭaykkuṁ murikkal taṟamēṭṭinuṁ tekkuḷḷa nālatirttikkakatt maññamala cāttāvineyuṁ malayaṭimāreyuṁ kūṭe aṭṭippēr eḻuti tannirikkunnu. kuṟimānaṁ keāllavarṣaṁ 614 (AD 1439)	തെക്കുംകൂർ സ്വരൂപത്തിങ്കനിന്നും പൂഞ്ഞാറ്റിൽ പെരുമാൾക്ക് മഞ്ഞമല പെരിയാർ ഉൾപ്പെട മലമ്പിറം എഴുതി കൊടുത്തതാവിത്. കൊല്ലം 594 (എ.ഡി.1419) മകരം ഞായറിൽ പൂഞ്ഞാർ ഉദയകുലശേഖരപ്പെരുമാൾ പണ്ടാരത്തിലേയ്ക്ക് വെൺപല നാട്ടുടയ കോതവർമ്മൻ കോവിലധികാരികൾ മഞ്ഞമല പെരിയാർ മലമ്പിറത്തിനതിര്. കിഴക്ക് കണ്ണമ്മേട്ടിനും തലക്കുളത്ത് മേട്ടിനും നേതാകര മേട്ടിനും വഴുക്കപ്പാറ മേട്ടിനും തലമല കിഴക്കോട്ട് ചാഞ്ഞതിനും മേക്കുത്തെക്ക് വഴുക്കപ്പാറയ്ക്കും മുല്ലയ്ക്കും പേരട പാറത്തോട്ടിനും തേവരക്കുളത്ത് മേട്ടിനും ചോറ്റിപ്പാറയ്ക്കും കൂട്ടിക്കൽക്കും മേക്കുവടക്ക് മന്നംമുട്ടിക്കും കുന്നോംമുറിക്കും കുടമുരുട്ടിമലയ്ക്കും മാർ മലയ്ക്കും പെരിയൽ മലയ്ക്കും പോഴാക്കല്ലിനും കിടങ്ങൽമുറിക്കും കിഴക്കുവടക്ക് നല്ല തണ്ണീരാറ്റിനും ചെങ്കരത്തോടിനും ചാഞ്ഞനോടയ്ക്കും മുരിക്കൽ തറമേട്ടിനും തെക്കുള്ള നാലതിർത്തിക്കകത്ത് മഞ്ഞമല ചാത്താവിനെയും മലയടിമാരെയും കൂടെ അട്ടിപ്പേർ എഴുതി തന്നിരിക്കുന്നു. കുറിമാനം കൊല്ലവർഷം 614 (എ.ഡി.1439)

== Rulers of Thekkumkur ==
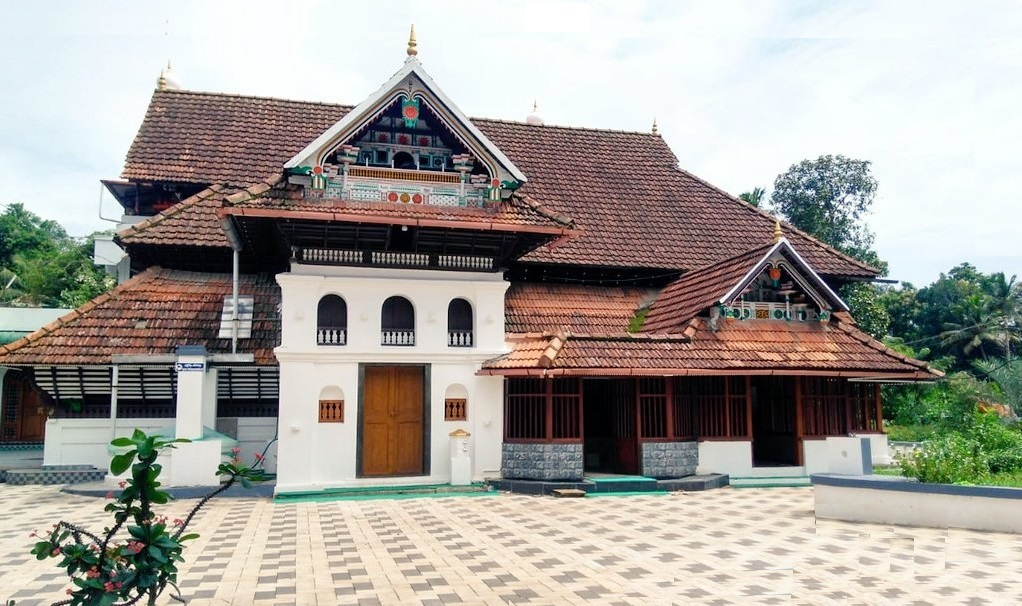
Thazhathangadi Juma Masjid built by Thekkumkur king

- Ilayaraja Vimbileeswaran of Vempally Palace: 1103 - 1150 C.E.; Founder of Thekkumkur Dynasty.
- Eravi Manikandan Varman: 1150 - 1180 C.E.; Mentioned in Aithihyamala of Kottarathil Sankunni; Rajarshi; Built Manikandapuram temple at Vakathanam.
- Kumaran Iyakan Manikandan: 1300 C.E.; Mentioned in Tiruvalla copper plates (Thiruvalla Grandhavari).
- Rama Varman Manikandan: 1350 - 1378 C.E.; Mentioned in the oldest literary in Malayalam language Unnuneeli Sandesam (sandesa kavyam).
- Kotha Varman Manikandan: 1408 - 1440 C.E.; Made a covenant to sold the possessions to Udaya Kulasekara Perumal of Pandya king to establish the Poonjar dynasty.
- Adithya Varman Manikandan: 1520 - 1555 C.E.; Built Thazhathangady Pally on the bank of Meenachil River.
- Eravi Varman Manikandan: 1555 - 1579 C.E.; Younger brother of Adithya Varman.
- Goda Varman Manikandan: 1579 - 1606 C.E.; Built Kottayam Cheriya Pally.
- Kerala Aditya Varman Manikandan: 1626 - 1629 C.E.; Mentioned in Vanchipuzha Madam Script.
- Kerararu Goda Varman Manikandan: 1650 - 1674 C.E.; Started a Deutsche school; A Mizhavu dedicated to Thaliyil temple in 1661.
- Unni Kerala Varman Manikandan: 1674 - 1691 C.E.; Built Keralapuram Palace in Kottayam.
- Udaya Marthanda Varman Manikandan: 1691 - 1717 C.E.; Built Chitrakulam Mahadevar Temple and Chitrakulam pond at Puzhavathu.
- Adithya Varman Manikandan: 1717 - 1750 C.E.; Last King of Thekkumkur Dynasty; Fought in Battle of Changanassery with Marthanda Varma of Travancore.

== Royal Palaces ==
The Neerazhi Palace (Changanassery) at Puzhavathu and Talikota Kovilakam (Thaliyanthanapuram) in Kottayam are the main residences of the Thekkumkur kings. Initially, the Maharaja lived in Venimala and Manikandapuram, which continued until the royal residence was moved to Neerazhi Palace. The Thekkumkur royal family had several palaces including Aranmula Palace, Keralapuram Palace, Edathil Palace Pallom etc.

== The Battle of Changanassery ==
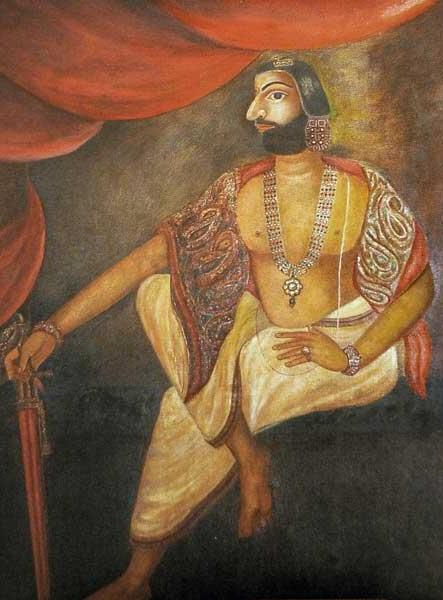
Marthanda Varma of Travancore who defeated Thekkumkur in the Battle of Changanassery

The last king of Thekkumkur was Aditya Varma Manikandan and he resided in the Neerazhi Palace at Changanassery. It was a time when an alliance between Adityavarma and his younger brother Goda Varman broke out. The king was willing to the alliance with Kochi, however, the crown prince was sympathetic to Travancore and Marthanda Varma. Goda Varman (crown prince of Thekkumkur) and Marthanda Varma of Travancore were classmates at Madurai when they were studying of Rajyadharma. After hearing of the military advance of the Travancore under the leadership of Ramayyan Dalawa and Caption De Lannoy; the crown prince of Thekkumkur (Goda Varman) then advised king Aditya Varma Manikandan to make a friendship with Travancore kingdom by understanding the downfall of princely state Ampalapuzha (Chempakassery) and the fall of princely state Kayamkulam. Meanwhile, when Marthanda Varma seized Kayamkulam and Chempakassery, Aditya Varma realized that they were the next victims and sent his brother to Thiruvananthapuram for an unconditional peace mission and met Anizham Thirunal Marthanda Varma of Travancore and requested help.

Unfortunately, Marthanda Varma asked Goda Varman, to promise that he would be in power if he helped to oust king Adithya Varman. Marthanda Varma had already heard the rift between the brothers. The younger king was well-received in the southern part of Thekkumkur kingdom. The self-righteous crown prince decided to return to Thekkumkur soon after the disagreement. The evil intelligence of Marthanda Varma and Ramayyan Dalawa aroused together. He sent a messenger to the younger king and told him the fake news, saying, "Departure to Kottayam immediately; the mother's health is bad". The crown prince Goda Varman decided to leave, boarded the boat and headed north; Marthanda Varma gave him some gifts for Thekkumkur king Aditya Varma Manikandan On the way, he descended on Anchuthengu Fort and received eleven ritual fire by the British authorities. From there he reached via Paravur Lake, Ashtamudi Lake, Kayamkulam Lake and Vembanadu Lake. The next day the boat of the crown prince reached Illyakkadavu at Thazhathangadi. Ramayyan's servants were followed by another boat and they slaughtered the crown prince Goda Varman and his servants. The next day was the declaration of war of Travancore. Crown prince's "classmate" challenges to Aditya Varman Manikandan for cheating and killing of his younger brother

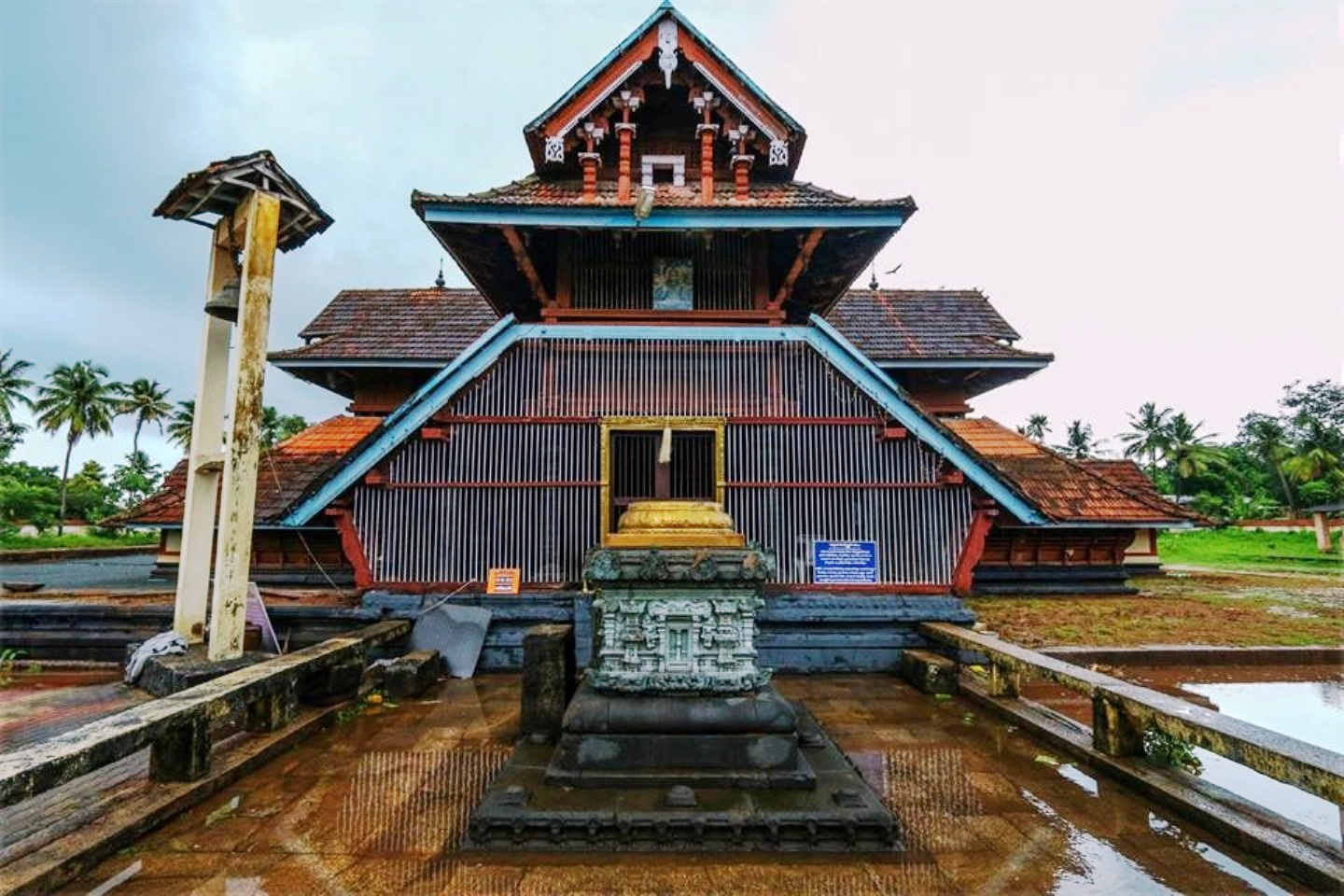
Vazhappally Maha Siva Temple

Ramayyan Dalawa spread the news that the Thekkumkur king Adithya Varman killed crown prince Goda Varman. But historian P. Shankuni Menon is justifying Travancore in his book Travancore History of Shankuni Menon. The Thekkumkur fort and the Neerazhi Palace at Changanassery were attacked in September 1749. The Vazhappally Pathillathil Potimar (administrator of Vazhappally Maha Siva Temple) assisted the king Aditya Varman in the Neerazhi Palace and transferred him to Nattassery at Kottayam. The Kannamperoor wooden bridge at Vazhappally was destroyed to prevent the Travancore troops from following them in the event of adverse weather. The Thekkumkur king Aditya Verman fled to Calicut and gave refuge to the Zamorin (Zamuthiri). Proceedings of September 11, 1749; On the 28th of the year Malayalam era 925 Chingam (September 11, 1749 AD), the capital of the Thekkumkur conquered by Ramayyan Dalawa and merged to Travancore kingdom.

== At present ==
The Thekkumkur Royal family members are now staying at Nattassery; now this Palace is visible with several ancient Nalukett & new houses constructed by current family members in close compounds of Edathil Bhagavathy Temple. Descendents of Thekkumkur Royal families stay in Nedikunnathu "Vazhuvelil" family and one branch moved to Kayamkulam and joined with their relative family which is also related to Odanadu (Kayamkulam) royal family and finally settled near Nurunadu and family are known as "Muthanttedam" or elder branch of Edathil (Thekkumkoor) Swarupam. Nediyanikkal Panayil Devi temple deity is worshipped by them as Edathil Bhagavathy. They lost their glorious past and live like any other Nair family and part of the Nalukett is renovated and some family members are living there .,.

After the subjugation of the Dutch by Travancore in 1742, military operations of Marthanda Varma progressed against the northern neighboring kingdoms including Thekkumkoor. Though Thekkumkoor allied with Chempakassery and Vadakkumkoor to protect the kingdom, all of them were finally annexed to Travancore.

The ruler of Thekkumkur had sided first with the Kingdom of Kayamkulam and then with the principality of Ambalapuzha against Travancore under Marthanda Varma. After the fall of Ambalapuzha, and as the ruler of Thekkumkoorr refused to come to terms with Travancore, his capital city was taken on 11 September 1750 by Ramayyan Dalawa, the general and prime minister of Marthanda Varma and the state was annexed to Travancore in 1753. The details of the battle are described in the 'History of Travancore From The Earliest Times' by P. Shankunni Menon, erstwhile Diwan Peshkar (a rank equivalent to Deputy Prime Minister) of the Travancore State and father of another noted historian K. P. Padmanabha Menon. Towards the end, the Thekkumkure Royal Family only controlled the small area of Kovilakam of Kolathu Kara Kozhanchery.

== Paradevatha ==
Edathil Bhagavathy is the paradevatha of the Thekkumcore Royal Family. Daily pūjās are performed by the Vadakkummal family. Vadakkummal Vikraman Namboodiri is the current main priest. The pūjās are performed by the thandri from surya Kaladi Mana. There will be a thrikala pūjā (meaning pūjās in the morning, noon & evening) on this day. It is a day for family get-togethers as well. The main pūjā is performed on Medam 18 (which usually it falls on 1 May) every year.

The last day ceremony of the Kumaranallor Temple Ulsavam, the ārāttu (the day after the Thrikkarthika) is performed at the Meenachil River which is close to the Edathil Temple (2 km away from Kumaranalloor Devi Temple). The ārāttu is performed near the Edathil Bhagavathi Temple once every year since Kumaranalloor Bhagavathi comes to see her sister the Edathil Bhagavathi. During the month of January Bhagavata Purana Sapthaham with Bhagavatham Moolam is conducted every year.
