= Aditya Varma Manikandan =

Maharaja of the Princely State of Thekkumkur

- Thekkumkur
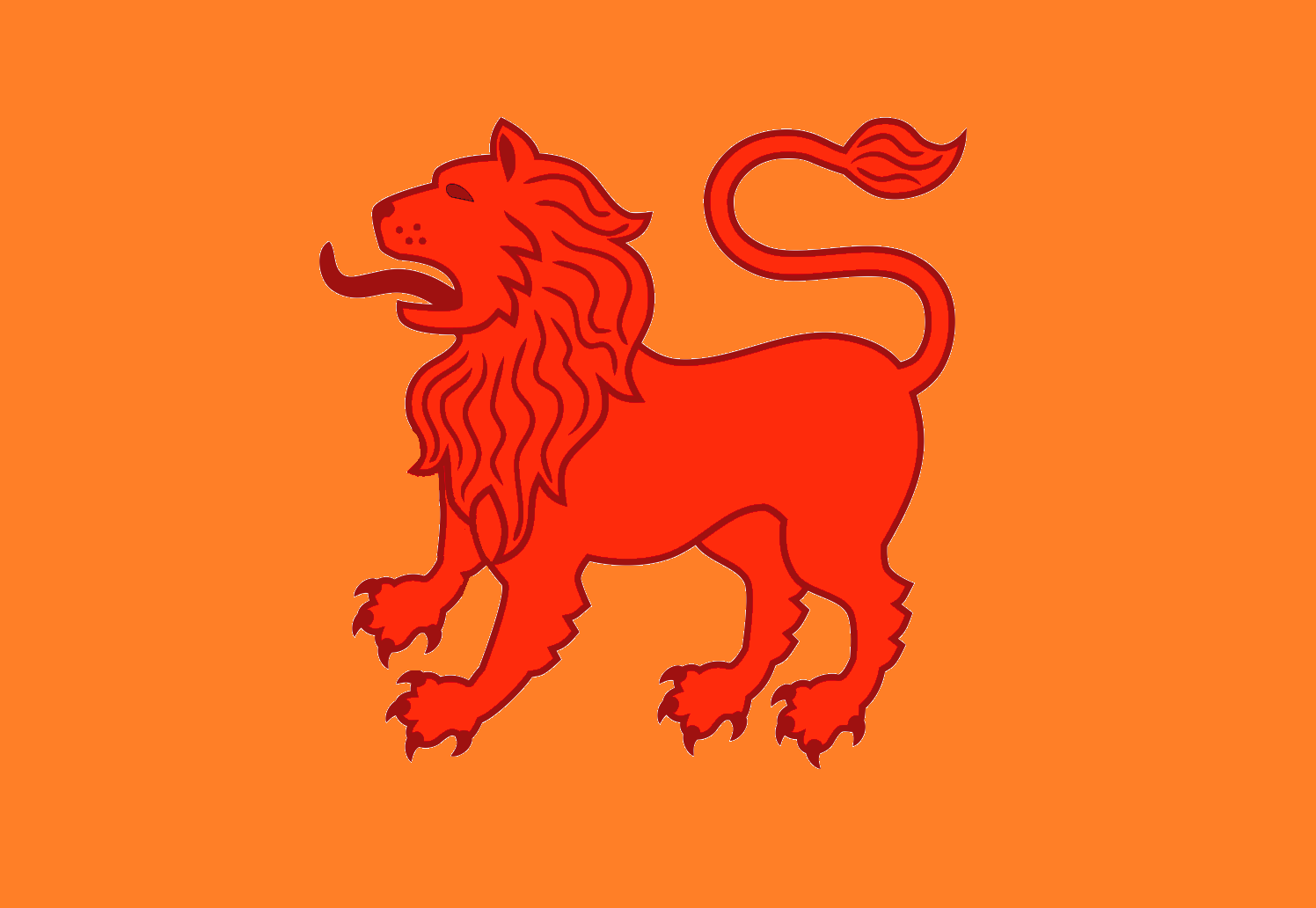
- Flag of Thekkumkur
- Reign: 1717 – September 1749
- Predecessor: Udaya Marthanda Varman Manikandan
- Born: Aditya Varman; 1701; Neerazhi Palace, Thekkumkur
- Died: September 1749 (aged 47–48); Nattassery, Kottayam
- Religion: Hinduism

Aditya Varma Manikandan (Malayalam: ആദിത്യ വർമ്മ മണികണ്ഠൻ), popularly known as Aditya Varman, was the last ruling Maharaja of the Princely State of Thekkumkur. He was the ruler until September 1749 when the king of Travancore Anizham Thirunal Marthanda Varma ousted him from Neerazi Palace at the Battle of Changanassery. Thekkumkur kings were known as Manikandan. The goddess was Cheruvally Bhagavathi in the space. The official residence of Sri Aditya Varma was Neerazi Palace.

== The Battle of Changanassery ==
It was a time when an alliance between Aditya Varma and his younger brother Goda Varma broke out. The king was willing to the alliance with Kochi, however, the crown prince was sympathetic to Travancore and Marthanda Varma. Goda Varman (crown prince of Thekkumkur) and Marthanda Varma of Travancore were classmates at Madurai when they were studying of Rajyadharma. After hearing of the military advance of the Travancore under the leadership of Ramayyan Dalawa and Caption De Lannoy; the crown prince of Thekkumkur (Goda Varman) then advised king Aditya Varma Manikandan to make a friendship with Travancore kingdom by understanding the downfall of princely state Ampalapuzha (Chempakassery) and the fall of princely state Kayamkulam. Meanwhile, when Marthanda Varma seized Kayamkulam and Chempakassery, Aditya Varma realized that they were the next victims and sent his brother to Thiruvananthapuram for an unconditional peace mission and met Anizham Thirunal Marthanda Varma of Travancore and requested help. Unfortunately, Marthanda Varma asked Goda Varman, to promise that he would be in power if he helped to oust king Adithya Varman. Marthanda Varma had already heard the rift between the brothers. The younger king was well-received in the southern part of Thekkumkur kingdom. The self-righteous crown prince decided to return to Thekkumkur soon after the disagreement. The evil intelligence of Marthanda Varma and Ramayyan Dalawa aroused together. He sent a messenger to the younger king and told him the fake news, saying, "Departure to Kottayam immediately; the mother's health is bad". The crown prince Goda Varman decided to leave, boarded the boat and headed north; Marthanda Varma gave him some gifts for Thekkumkur king Aditya Varma Manikandan On the way, he descended on Anchuthengu Fort and received eleven ritual fire by the British authorities. From there he reached via Paravur Lake, Ashtamudi Lake, Kayamkulam Lake and Vembanadu Lake. The next day the boat of the crown prince reached Illyakkadavu at Thazhathangadi. Ramayyan's servants were followed by another boat and they slaughtered the crown prince Goda Varman and his servants. The next day was the declaration of war of Travancore. Crown prince's "classmate" challenges to Aditya Varman Manikandan for cheating and killing of his younger brother

Ramayyan Dalawa spread the news that the Thekkumkur king Adithya Varman killed crown prince Goda Varman. But historian P. Shankuni Menon is justifying Travancore in his book Travancore History of Shankuni Menon. The Thekkumkur fort and the Neerazhi Palace at Changanassery were attacked in September 1749. The Vazhappally Pathillathil Pottimar(administrator of Vazhappally Maha Siva Temple) assisted the king Aditya Varman in the Neerazhi Palace and transferred him to Nattassery at Kottayam. The Kannamperoor wooden bridge at Vazhappally was destroyed to prevent the Travancore troops from following them in the event of adverse weather. The Thekkumkur king Aditya Verman fled to Calicut and gave refuge to the Zamorin (Zamuthiri). Proceedings of 11 September 1749; On the 28th of the year Malayalam era 925 Chingam (11_September_1749 AD), the capital of the Thekkumkur conquered by Ramayyan Dalawa and merged to Travancore kingdom.
