= Battle of Changanassery =

Battle in 1749 between Thekkumkur and Travancore, India

- Part of the Travancore-Thekkumkur War
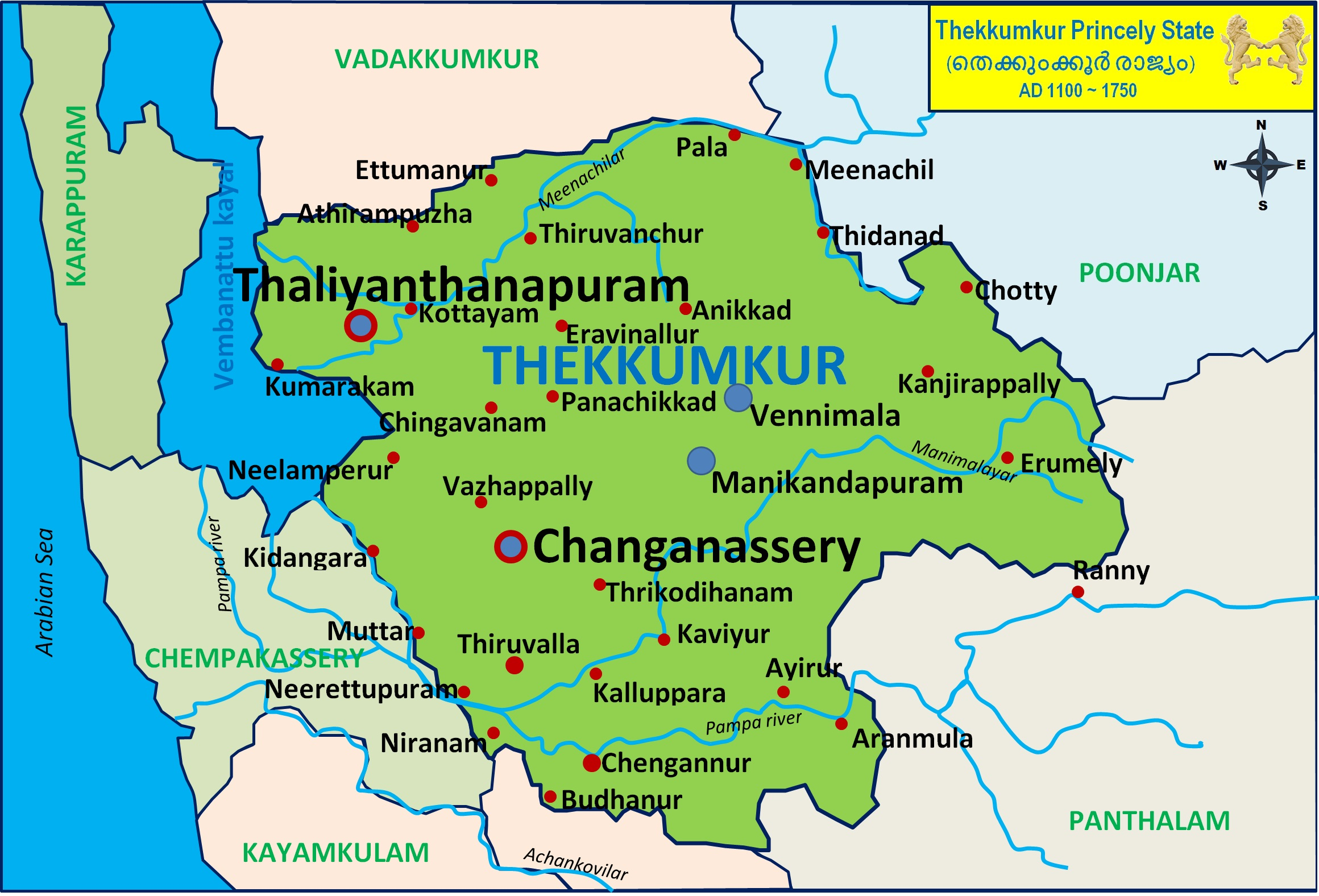
- Map of Thekkumkur Kingdom
Date	September 1749
Location	Changanassery, Kingdom of Thekkumkur, India 9.451°N 76.545°E
Result	Victory for the Kingdom of Travancore

Belligerents
Kingdom of Travancore	Kingdom of Thekkumkur

Commanders and leaders
Marthanda Varma: Ramayyan Dalawa; Eustachius De Lannoy; Kumaraswamy Pillai	Aditya Varma Manikandan: Vazhappadathu Panicker; Pathillathil Pottimar (executed)

Strength
10,000–12,000 soldiers	Unknown

The Battle of Changanacherry was a battle between the kingdoms of Thekkumkur and Travancore in September 1749. Defeat in this decisive battle led to Thekkumkur losing its dominance and expanding the Tranvancore empire to the southern border of the river Meenachilar.

The kingdom of Travancore conquered the princely states of Kayamkulam and Ambalapuzha under the leadership of Ramayyan Dalawa (the Dewan of Travancore). Thekkumkur army provided assistance to counter Travancore's invasion of princely state Ambalapuzha. Realizing this, King Marthanda Varma decided to invade Thekkumkoor following the fall of Champakassery (Ampalapuzha).

== The cause of the war ==
In the 13th century, Thekkumkur Rajdhani was shifted to Puzhavathu in Changanassery after Thrikkodithanam, Vennimala, Manikandapuram and others. The last king of Thekkumkur was Aditya Varma Manikandan and he resided in the Neerazhi Palace at Changanassery. After hearing of the military advance of the Travancore under the leadership of Ramayyan Dalawa; the crown prince of Thekkumkur then advised Aditya Varma Manikandan to make a friendship with Travancore kingdom by understanding the downfall of princely state Ampalapuzha (Chempakassery) and the fall of princely state Kayamkulam.

Then crown prince (Ilaya rajah) went to Thiruvananthapuram and met Anizham Thirunal Marthanda Varma and requested help. Aditya Varma Manikandan, angry at the crown prince's action, a messenger was sent to Thiruvananthapuram carrying a letter purportedly written by his sick mother. The crown prince had told king Marthanda Varma that this was a strategy to annihilate him, but king persuaded him to go to Changanassery to meet his sick mother and gave him some gifts for Thekkumkur king Aditya Varma Manikandan.

When the young prince reached Thekkumkur, he was assassinated by the royal guards at the behest of his elder brother. The king spread the news that the prince Kotha Varma had died of a snake bite. Recognizing the news from Thekkumkur about the wrong decision of the Thekkumkur king, Marthanda Varma of Travancore ordered Ramayyan Dalawa to march to Thekkumkur and capture the king Aditya Varma Manikandan

== The War ==
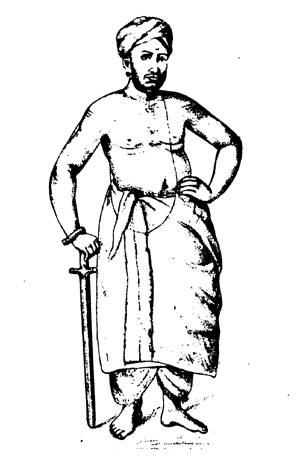
Ramayyan Dalawa

When the Travancore troops reached Aranmula in the south of Thekkumkur kingdom, the Telugu Brahmins stopped the Travancore army in the belief, that in Travancore the life of a Brahman was sacred, and consequently that they would not be in danger of being attacked. On this, Ramayya requested Captain D'Lanoy to do his duty without shrinking. D'Lanoy called a few companies of his detachment, consisting of Christians, Moplahs and fishermen, directed them to drive away the mob of Brahmans and clear the way for the march. By the confusion created by the Brahmins, sufficient time was afforded to the King Aditya Varma Manikandan, who was at a place near Aranmula, to flee from his country to the north. After defeating the Telugu Brahmins at Aranmula, Ramayan Dalawa took over Thiruvalla gramam, where the Vilakkilli Madom Pottimar gave no resistance. Ramayyan's next target was the Neerazhi Palace of Thekkumkur at Changanassery. The Thekkumkur had a larger and stronger army than the other princely states (Kayamkulam, Ampalapuzha) conquered by the Ramayyan. The Thekkumkur fort and the Neerazhi palace at Changanasseri were attacked in September 1749.

On 11 September 1750, Ramayyan Dalawah took possession of Changanasserri, the seat of the Thakankoor Rajah. The State treasury, jewels, arms and property of a considerable value, fell into Ramayyan's hands, among which were some brass guns and mortars of European manufacture.

The Vazhappally Pathillathil Potimar (administrator of Vazhappally Maha Siva Temple) assisted the Thekkumkur king in the Neerazhi Palace and transferred him to Nattassery at Kottayam. The Kannamperoor wooden bridge at Vazhappally was destroyed to prevent the Travancore troops from following them in the event of adverse weather. The Thekkumkur king Aditya Verma fled to Calicut and was given refuge by the Zamorin (Zamuthiri). By this time, Ramayyan had influenced Vazhappadathu Paniker, the commander of Thekkumkur, and had learned the movement secret of the Pathillathil Pottimar. Proceedings of 11 September 1749; On the 28th of the year Malayalam era 925 Chingam (11_September_1749 AD), the capital of the Thekkumkur conquered by Ramayyan Dalawa and merged to Travancore kingdom.

== The Vazhappally Pathillathil Pottimar ==
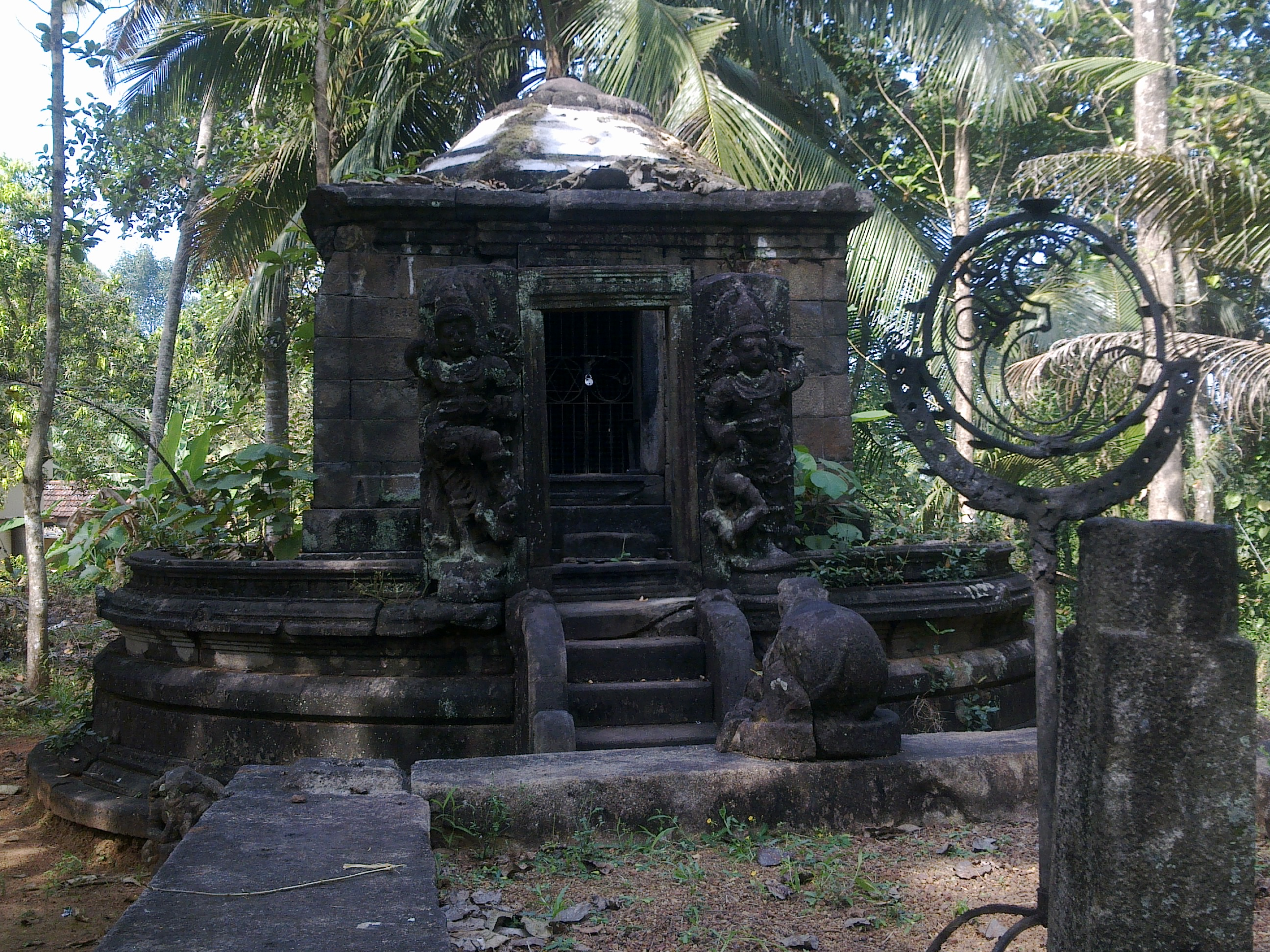
Vazhappally Shala - A temple at Vazhappally that was attacked

The Pathillathil pottimar (10 Brahmin families as the administrator of Vazhappally Maha Siva Temple) were charged with treason because they helped the Thekkumkur' Rajah Aditya Varma Manikandan to escape the Changanassery and resist the march of Marthanda Varma's army by demolishing the Kannanperoor bridge at Vazhappally. The Vazhappally Pottimar initially deterred the Travancore army by the fate of the Thekkumkur Rajah and they did not expect Marthanda Varma to kill Brahmins who is the administrator of Vazhappally Maha Siva Temple.

Most of the male members of the Brahmins family were either killed or exiled after sufficient evidence of conspiracy and murder was procured. Their houses were dug up (Kulamthondal - Malayalam: കുളംതോണ്ടൽ - a common punishment of the time) and all their assets and armies seized by the victorious Marthanda Varma. At the beginning of the 20th century, only one family was left in the Vazhappally Gramam from Pathillathil Pottimar.

== Aftermath ==
After the battle, Marthanda Varma arrived at Changanassery. Many of the Nair nobles and chiefs called Karthavu, Kaimal, Elayadam and Panicker of the Thekkumkoor, as well as those of Ambalapuzha and Vadakkumkur presented themselves before the victorious Marthanda Varma at Changanasserry and acknowledging his sovereignty, paid homage with large nuzzers. Ramayya marched to the north, and after fortifying the positions between Thekkumkoor and Vadakkumkoor from Kumarakam to the east up to the hills at Koondoor, marched towards the north to settle the northern boundary, which was extended to the southern bank of the Periyar which runs to the west by Aluva. All the country south of the Dutch possessions at Kodungalloor thus became the Travancore Maha Raja's dominions. Marthanda Varma thus extended his country from Kanyakumari to Periyar, and brought all the Rajas, petty chiefs, and nobles into subjection.

== Sources ==
- Travancore State Manual by V.Nagam Aiya (1906)
- Thekkumkoor Charithravum Puravrithavum by N.E Kesavan Namboothiri (2014)
- History of Travancore by Shungunny Menon
- Aiya, V. Nagam (1906). Travancore State Manual. Travancore Government Press.
