= Talikotta Mahadeva Temple =

- Temple Gopuram

- Thaliyil Mahadeva Temple, Thazhathangadi, Kottayam, Kerala

Religion
- Affiliation: Hinduism
- District: Kottayam
- Deity: Shiva
- Festival: Maha Shivaratri

Location
- Location: Thazhathangadi
- State: Kerala
- Country: India
- Coordinates: 9.596331°N 76.506601°E

Architecture
- Type: Kerala style
- Completed: Not known

Specifications
- Temple: One
- Monument: 1

Talikotta Mahadeva Temple or Thaliyil Mahadeva Temple, an ancient Hindu temple dedicated to Shiva is located on the banks of Meenachil River on Kottayam - Kumarakom Road in Kottayam District in Kerala state in India. The Keezhtali Mahadeva Temple is one of the important temples in Thekkumkur Kingdom. According to folklore, sage Parashurama has installed the idol of Shiva. The temple is a part of the 108 Shiva Temples in Kerala. The temple is one of the four thali temples mentioned in the 108 Shiva temple sothram (1. Tali Temple, Kozhikkode, 2. Kaduthruthy Mahadeva Temple, Kottayam, 3. Keezhtali Mahadeva Temple, Kodungallur, 4. Talikotta Mahadeva Temple, Kottayam.) The temple houses Lord Shiva in his most angry form. There are sub-shrines for Ganapathi, Ayyappan and Bhadrakali in the temple.

== History ==
Main Sreekovil

The Thalikotta Mahadeva Temple is near Uppoottikkavala at Thazhathangadi in Kottayam Taluk. It was an important place of worship for the erstwhile Thekkumkur Kingdom. Thekkumkoor kingdom of the 11th century comprised Kottayam, Changanassery and Thiruvalla and High range areas like Mundakkayam and Kanjirapally. After Venimala, Manikandapuram and Changanassery, the capital of thekumkoor become Talikota in the bank of Meenchil River. The temple and the royal house was protected by a fort known as Thaliyilkotta and as a result the locality came to be known in the same name as the fort. On a later stage, Tekkumkoor kings shifted their royal house to Nattassery (Near Kumaranalloor) on the outskirts of Kottayam town. After the Changanassery War in 1750, military operations of Marthanda Varma progressed against the Thalikotta fort and palace at Thaliyanthanapuram (Kottayam). Though Thekkumkoor allied with Chempakassery and Vadakkumkoor to protect the kingdom, all of them were finally annexed to Travancore.

== Gallery ==
West side (front)

Faded murals of sreekovil

Entrance
