= Vennimala =

- Village
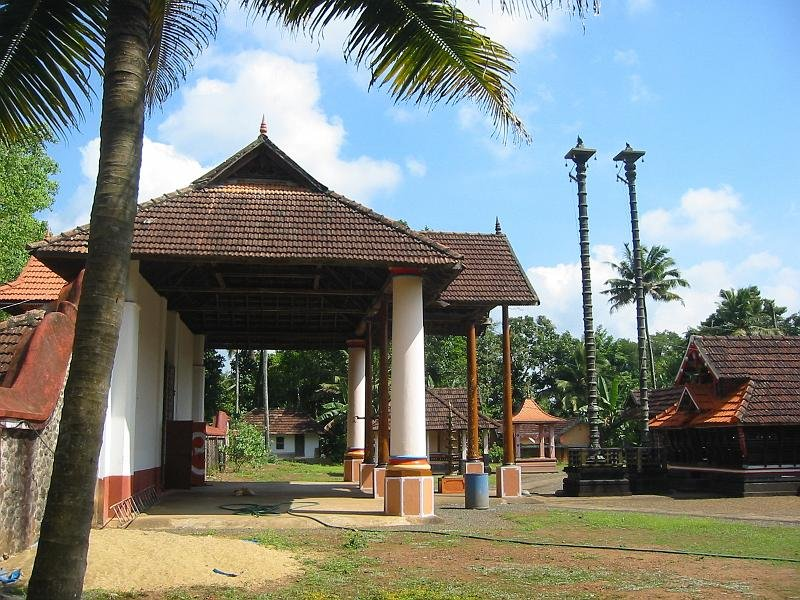
- Vennimala Sree Rama Lakshmana Temple
- Nickname: Vijayadri
- Interactive map of Vennimala
- Coordinates: 9.5686094°N 76.6027126°E
- Country: India
- State: Kerala
- District: Kottayam

Languages
  - Official: Malayalam, English
- Time zone: UTC+5:30 (IST)
- PIN: 686516
- Telephone code: 0481
- Climate: Tropical monsoon (Köppen)
- Avg. summer temperature: 28 °C (82 °F)
- Avg. winter temperature: 16 °C (61 °F)

Vennimala is a small village located in Puthuppally Grama Panchayath of the Kottayam district in Kerala. Vennimala is 16 kilometres (9.9 mi) east of Kottayam. It lies between the towns of Western Kerala and the mountains of the Western Ghats. Vennimala was once a dense forest.

In Hindu mythology, Rama and Lakshman visited this place in Treta Yuga and, Lakshman killed many demons (asuras) who threatened and harassed the local sages. Laxman's victory was celebrated in the village's name Vijayadri (successful place in Sanskrit) (Vennimala in Malayalam).

There is a temple on the hill built by Bhaskaravarman. The present building may be of a later date, but the temple is believed to be about 1,000 years old. The main idol is Lakshmana Perumal. The state of Kerala has declared Vennimala in the Sri Rama-Lakshmana Swamy temple as a protected monument. Vennimala is the initial headquarters of the Thekkumkur dynasty
