= Ramayyan Dalawa =

Administrator and politician

Ramayyan
- Dalawa
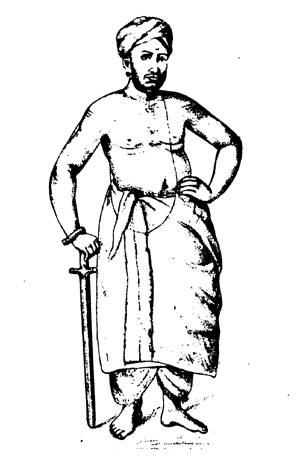
- Ramayyan portrait with sword

Diwan of Travancore
- Reign: 1737–1756
- Born: 1713; Yerwadi, Tirunelveli district, Tamil Nadu
- Died: 1756 (aged 42–43); Mavelikkara, Travancore

Ramayyan Dalawa (1713–1756) was the Dalawa of Travancore state, India, during 1737 and 1756 and was responsible for the consolidation and expansion of that kingdom after the defeat of the Dutch at the 1741 Battle of Colachel during the reign of Maharajah Marthanda Varma, the creator of modern Travancore.

== Early life ==
Ramayyan, was born in a Tamil Brahmin family in Yerwadi, a village in Tirunelveli district, Tamil Nadu to which his family originally belonged. When he was six years of age his poor father gave up his native village and came to Thiruvattar and settled at a hamlet known as Aruvikara in the Kalkulam Taluka in the modern-day Kanyakumari District of Tamil Nadu state. When he was twenty years old he lost his parents, who he survived along with their other three sons and one daughter.

After the death of his parents, Ramayyan frequently visited Trivandrum, attracted to it by the never ending festivities and celebrations, which always drew great crowds of Tamil Brahmins from all over Travancore and neighbouring regions of modern-day Tamil Nadu. On one occasion he decided to stay back and seek some employment in Trivandrum in which, owing to his superior intelligence and ability, he was successful. He was employed as an assistant to the Attiyara Pohtty Brahmin of Vanchiyoor, a member of the Ettara Yogam or the Council of Eight and a Half who controlled the Temple of Padmanabhapuram and a man of great power and influence.

== Association with the Maharajah ==
While employed with the Attiyara Pohtty one evening, when the Maharajah Marthanda Varma was dining at Attiyara, he noticed Ramayyan who impressed him by dealing with a minor yet significant incident with great sense and intelligence. The pleased Marthanda Varma asked the Attiyara Pohtty to let him take the young boy into his service which being permitted Ramayyan became a servant of the Maharajah of Travancore.

== Career ==
Ramayyan from being appointed at a minor post in the Palace management soon rose in the Maharajah's favour and was appointed Palace Rayasom or Under Secretary wherein he fulfilled his duties ably. Thus when the then Dalawa or Dewan of Travancore, Arumukham Pillai, died in the year 1736, Ramayyan was appointed Dalawa by the very impressed Maharajah Marthanda Varma.

== Military conquests ==
The entire territorial extent of Travancore state namely between the River Periyar and Cape Comorin was attained with the efforts of Ramayyan Dalawa on behalf of his King Marthanda Varma. It was due to his efforts and conquests that the kingdoms of Kayamkulam, Madathinkoor (Mavelikkara), Elayadathu Swaroopam, Quilon, Ambalapuzha etc. were annexed to Travancore and the Dutch were defeated in the Battle of Colachel. He defended the invasion of Carnatic Sultanate in 1740. Although he failed to defend the invasion, Marthanda Varma managed to regain the territory by paying a huge amount to Nizam of Carnatic. Several favourable treaties were signed with the British under his Dalawaship while the Kingdom of Cochin and the Zamorin accepted the suzerainty of Travancore.

== Family ==
Ramayyan Dalawa's two sons and one daughter moved back to Tamil Nadu after his death. His family finally settled in the erstwhile Pudukkottai state (a Princely State in Tamil Nadu). The then king of Pudukkotta, who had a good rapport with the Travancore state, offered Dalawa's descendants the entire village of Sithanavasal.

== Death ==
Ramayyan Dalawa resided in the town of Mavelikkara where he had a palace built by Marthanda Varma. After the death of his wife, Ramayyan married a Malayala unnithan lady from Mavelikkara of the Edassery family. After his death Ramayyan's descendants left to Pudukkottai in Tamil Nadu and settled there. His mayali wife was given gifts and presents and special allowances from the Travancore government in recognition of his services to the state while his own descendants were bestowed with the honorific title of Dalawa. The able Dalawa died in the year 1756. Marthanda Varma was terribly saddened by his death, and finally followed his faithful servant in 1758. The last Diwan of Travancore is from this family, Sri PGN Unnithan hailed from the Edassery Pattaveettil Family of Mavelikkara which had a history of high military service to the Travancore Royal Family. His father Ittamar Koil Thampuran was from the Haripad Palace and nephew of Kerala Varma Valiya Koil Thampuran.

== Relations with Marthanda Varma ==
The Maharajah Marthanda Varma and Ramayyan Dalawa were more than just king and minister to each other. They were intimate friends (like Chandragupta Maurya and Chanakya), so much that after the death of Ramayyan the Maharajah became depressed and declined in health prior to his death in 1758. Ramayyan Dalawa was one of the ablest and most popular ministers of Travancore and while on his death bed when asked how he would want his memory perpetuated he merely stated that he was an "instrument in the hands of my master (Marthanda Varma) and had no such ambitions."

== Enmity between Ramayyan Dalawa and Nampoothiris of Kayamkulam ==
Ramayyan Dalawa was the main enemy of the Nampoothiris of Travancore who lived in Kayamkulam and nearby places. During the Kayamkulam war, Ramayyan Dalawa attacked and looted the Nambiathiris, high order Nampoothiris having the knowledge of Dhanurveda—the science of arms in ancient times—and who were the local rulers of 'Swaroopams', a small area covering five or six villages, and the owners of temples in this region for defeating Kayamkulam as there were well trained armies of Nairs under each Nambiathiris . After winning the battle with Kayamkulam, Ramayyan downgraded them. As a protest, many Nampoothiris left and went to northern places and lived as Nampoothiris. Many of the Nampoothiris remained at Kayamkulam, Oachira, Mavelikkara and Haripad were down graded as 'Nambiathis' the 'purohithas' of local Nairs. In the meantime a new group of Brahmins were brought to these places from the Kolathu Nadu and posted as priests in many temples in these regions . They were called Thiruvalla Desis by the locals or simply Thiruvalla potties and later they were given the status of Nampoothiris during the beginning of 'Kollavarsham' 1109. Thus the erstwhile Nampoothiris in this region became second grade Nampoothiris and known as Nambiathis and as a result they hated Ramayyan Dalawa. Ward and Corner, two British surveyors who conducted a survey in erstwhile Travancore and Cochin at the beginning of 19th century observed that many Nampoothiris of Kayamkulam and surroundings migrated to northern Kerala during Ramayyan Dalawa's time.

== See also ==
- Dewan
- Marthanda Varma
- Travancore
- PGN Unnithan
- Mavelikara
- Marthandavarma (novel)
