= Vazhappally =

- Village
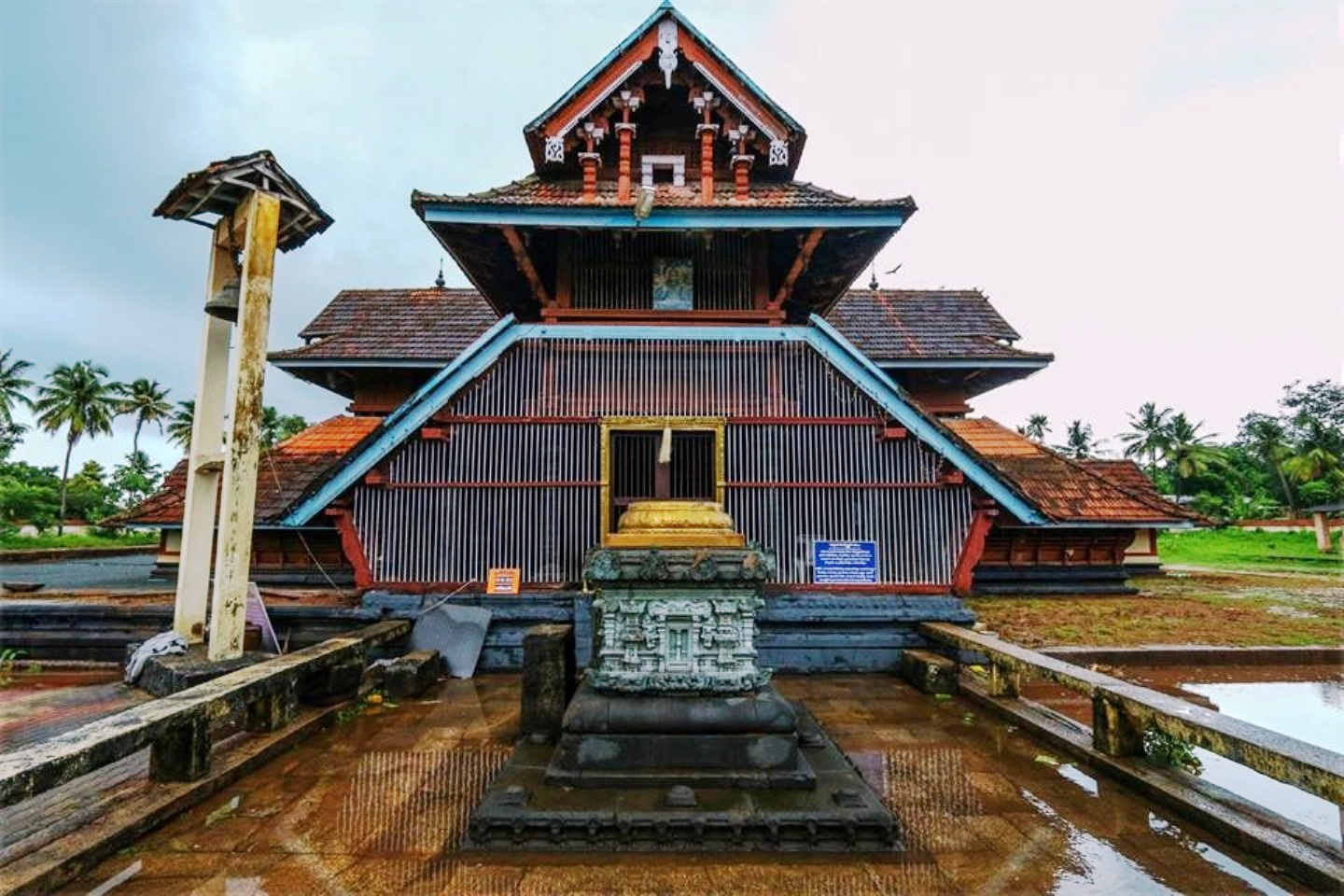
- Vazhappally Temple
- Nickname: The way Malayalam came to be
- Interactive map of Vazhappally
- Coordinates: 9.4562461°N 76.5241115°E
- Country: India
- State: Kerala
- District: Kottayam

Population (2001)
  - Total: 51,960

Languages
  - Official: Malayalam, English
- Time zone: UTC+5:30 (IST)
- PIN: 686103
- Telephone code: 0481
- Coastline: 0 kilometres (0 mi)
- Climate: Tropical monsoon (Köppen)
- Avg. summer temperature: 35 °C (95 °F)
- Avg. winter temperature: 20 °C (68 °F)

Vazhappally is a suburb of Changanasserry Municipality, Kottayam District, in central Kerala. The famous Vazhappally Shiva Temple is situated in Vazhappally. Vazhappally is a part of Changanacherry Taluk in Kottayam District. It is located in the city of Changanacherry and Vazhappally Panchayath. The ancient Vazhappally gramam (village) was shifted to the Changanassery Municipality, so small portions of the village were reunited in the Municipal Town of Changanassery, while the rest were reconstructed in the Vazhappally Gram Panchayat.

== The origin of the name ==
Vazhappally is "Vazhkai Pally" (Malayalam: വാഴ്കൈ പള്ളി) means let the temple win. There are various theories as to the origin of the word 'Pally'. Pally is a word in the Pali language.

== History ==
The temple was very popular in the second Chera dynasty. After the fall of the Cheras, the place came under several rulers, the Thekkumkur and Travancore kings were prominent, witnessed many brutal wars, treachery, murder and annihilation. However, in all these cases, the temple was saved from destruction. The Vazhappally Maha Siva Temple is located in the heart of the ancient Vazhappally village. In the Chera dynasty, Changanacherry was part of Vazhappally Gramam. The old highway passes (Thiruvananthapuram - Tripunithura Road) through the eastern boundary of Vazhappally. During the rule of the Chera kings, the rulers of the state were in the Vazhappally Mahadeva temple. Many of the commands issued are examples of this (eg:- Vazhappally copper plates. Ancient Vazhappally was also an area where caste system, feudalism and untouchability were strong.

== Vazhappally Inscription ==
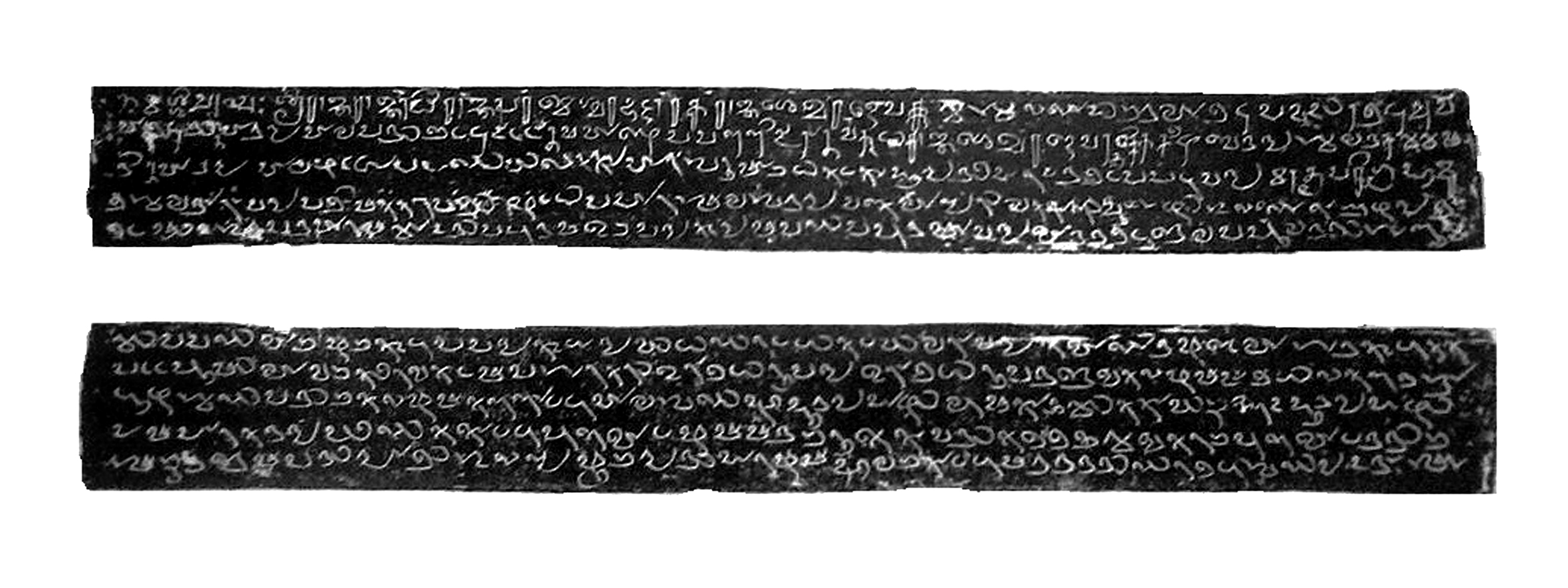
Vazhappally Copper Plate

Vazhappally copper plate, dated to around 830 AD, is the earliest available inscription in Malayalam language. It is a temple committee resolution in the presence of the Chera king of Kodungallur Rama "Rajasekhara" (9th century AD). The copper plate (incomplete) is engraved in an old form of Malayalam in Vattezhuthu and Grantha scripts. Rajasekhara is usually identified by scholars with Cheraman Perumal Nayanar, the venerated Shaiva (Nayanar) poet-musician. The inscription of Vazhappally who contributed immensely to the historical writing tradition of Kerala was written by AD 830. According to historians, Raja Rajasekhara Deva ruled from 820 to 844 AD.
