= Vazhappally Maha Siva Temple =

Shiva temple in Kerala, India

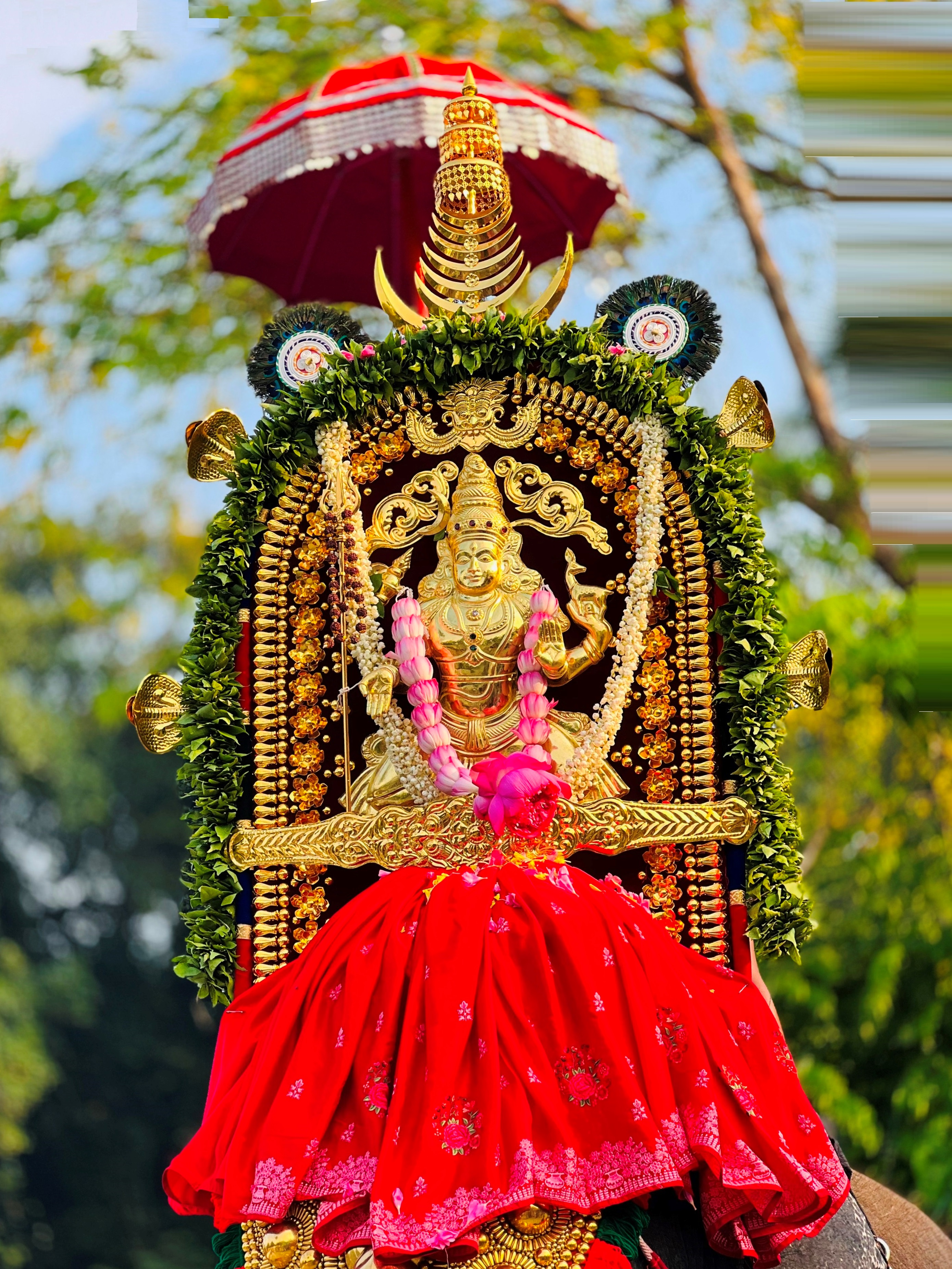
- Golden Thidampu of Vazhappally temple

- Location within Kerala

Religion
- Affiliation: Hinduism
- District: Kottayam
- Deity: Shiva; Parvati; Ganesha; Painkuni Festival; Mudiyeduppu; Shiva Ratri; Vinayak Chaturthi

Location
- Location: Vazhappally, Changanassery
- State: Kerala
- Country: India
- Coordinates: 9°27′21.852″N 76°31′35.8824″E

Architecture
- Type: Kerala Architecture
- Creator: Rebuilt by Cheraman Perumal (Nayanar)
- Completed: Rebuilt in 820 CE
- Temple: 2
- Inscriptions: Vazhappally copper plate

Vazhappally Maha Siva Temple is a Hindu temple located in Vazhappally near Changanassery in Kottayam district in the Indian state of Kerala. The temple is administered by the Travancore Devaswom Board. The temple is believed to be constructed by the first Chera king of Kodungallur. The legends suggest that the installation of the idol of god Mahadeva (Shiva) was performed by Parasurama himself. This temple is one among the 108 Shiva temples established by Parasurama. It is one of the few temples in Kerala where two nalambalams and two flag-masts are dedicated. The temple, a Grama Kshetra, also contains some seventeenth century wood carvings (daru silpas) depicting figurines from epics. A Vattezhuttu inscription on the northern part of the base of the cultural shrine indicates that the repairs were completed in Kollam Era 840 (1665 CE).

== The Legend ==
In the time of Pallibana perumal, it was decided to convert the Neelamperoor Shiva Temple into a Buddhist monastery. It is believed that the ten Brahmin families (later known as Pattiyillam Pottimar) came to Vazhappally by shaking the Shiva Linga of the temple of Neelamperoor and then merged with the existing shiva temple in Vazhappally. The Shiva lingam brought from Neelamperoor was first placed in the Devalokam at north part of Vazhappally gramam. Later, when they tried to shake the Shiva Linga but was unable to do so, Parasurama appeared to the grieving Brahmin family and offered him the Shiva Linga he had worshiped and advised him to build the temple on the Ardhanariswara concept. He built a huge shrine for the Shiva Linga and the Parvati idol.

The sanctum sanctorum was built inside the three walls of the rounded stone granite shrine to the east of the Shiva Linga and to the west the Parvathi idol. Dakshinamoorthy and Ganapathi were placed inside the sanctum sanctorum as a vision south. In the south-eastern corner of the Nambalam, there was a large Tidapalli built. Raja built the subshrine temple for Sastha at the Kannimoola outside the Nambalam temple. He was promoted to the position of temple tantric rites to the Taranalloor series and the Tulu Brahmin family of Kasaragod for priests for daily pooja. The main priest was appointed as an umbrella and provided accommodation in the Kuthasanthi Math.

== History ==
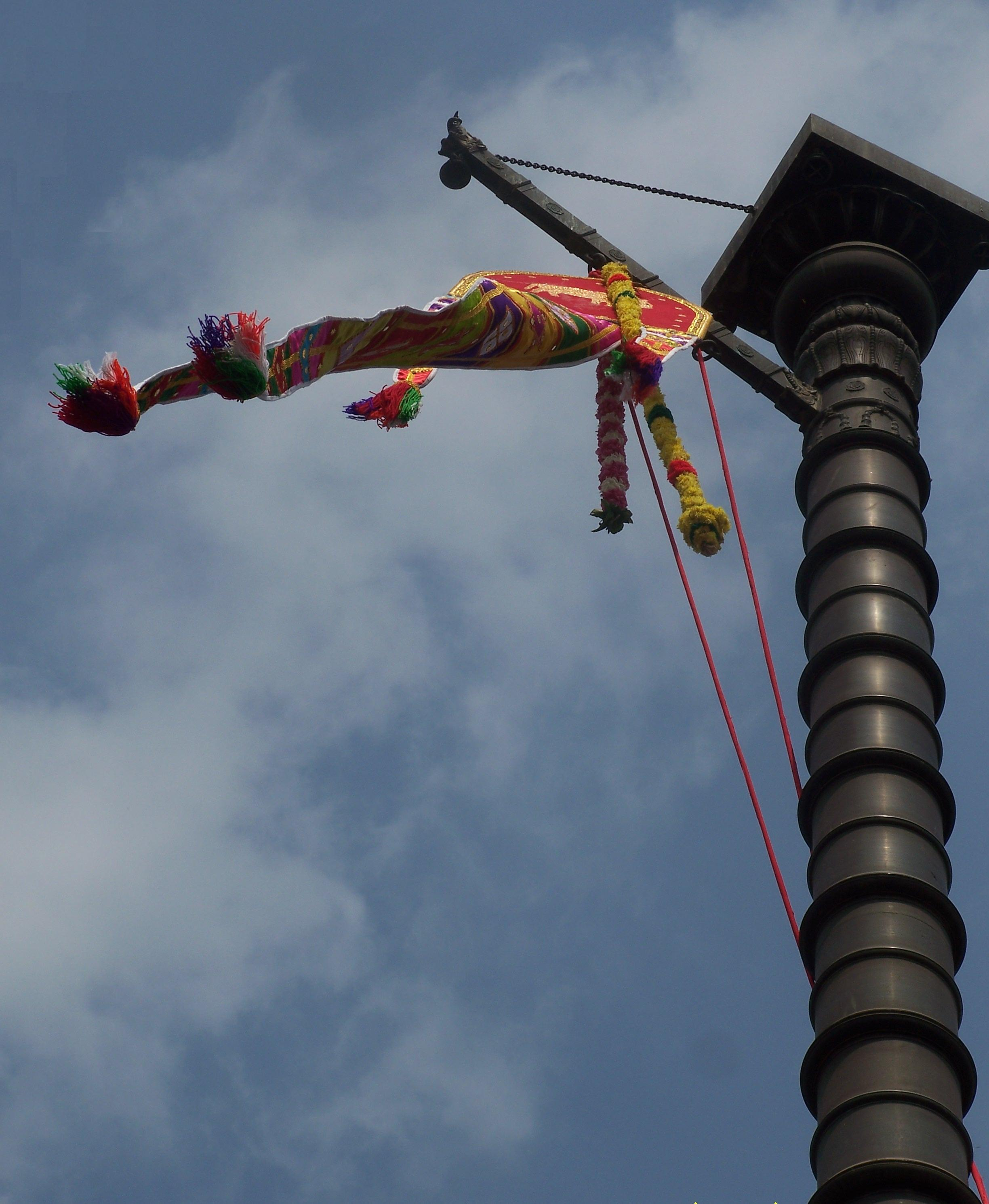
Flag-mast of the Vazhappally Temple

The temple was very popular in the second Chera dynasty. After the fall of the Cheras, the place came under several rulers, the Thekkumkur and Travancore kings were prominent, witnessed many brutal wars, treachery, murder and annihilation. However, in all these cases, the temple was saved from destruction by the will of God and the prayers of the devotees. The legend behind this concept is that Chera king Palli Bana Perumal, when de-throwned by the Bhattas (learned Brahmins) following a defeat in argument, traveled to Neelamperoor. The news came to the ears of the Potti Leaders of the Pathu Illams (Chengazhi Muttam, Kainikkara, Eravi Mangalam, Kunnithidasserry, Athrasserry, Kolencherry, Kizhangazhuthu, Kannancherry, Thalavana etc.), that the king is going to install his own personal idol at Neelamperoor. The Potti Leaders of the Pathu Illams thus managed to run with the idol of Neelamperoor Shiva and install it at Vazhappally.

=== Ten Illoms ===
The temple administration belonged to ten Brahmin families (ten illoms). These ten Brahmin families came from Neelamperoor village later settled in Vazhappally. Their temple administration lasted until the end of the 17th century. These are the ten Brahmin families are "Changazhimuttom, Kainikkara, Iravimangalom, Kunnithidasseri, Athrsseri, Kolancheri, Kizhangezhuthu, Kizhakkumbhagom, Kannancheri, Thalavana". The famous Copper scripts (Vazhappally Inscription) was recovered from one of this mattu "Thalavana Mutt". The main rituals in the Vazhappally temple were conducted by the monks of the Changazhimutttom Mutt.

=== Cheraman Perumal ===
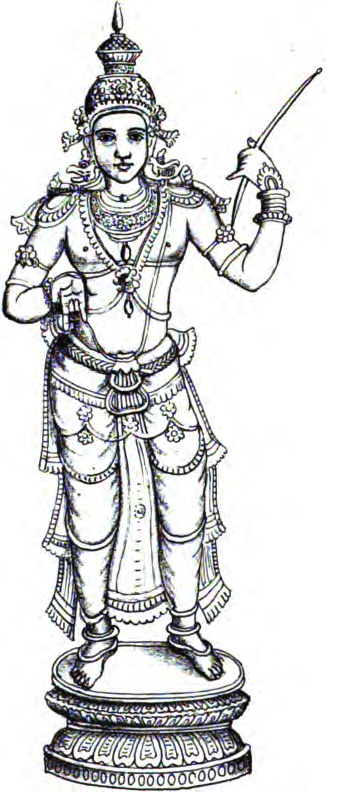
Cheraman Perumal

Rajasekhara Varman (820-844 CE) was the second emperor of the Kulasekhara series. His story is recounted in the Chekkizhar Periyapuranam. It is believed that during his tenure, the steps were taken to renovate the Vazhappally temple. Rajasekhara Varma is said to have been the contemporary of Adi Shankaracharya, as he is mentioned in the Adi Shankaracharya and Shankaracharya victory of Madhavacharya. The oldest inscription received from Kerala is the Vazhappally inscription by Rajasekhara Varman (Cheraman Perumal) of Chera dynasty.

=== Raja Chempakassery ===
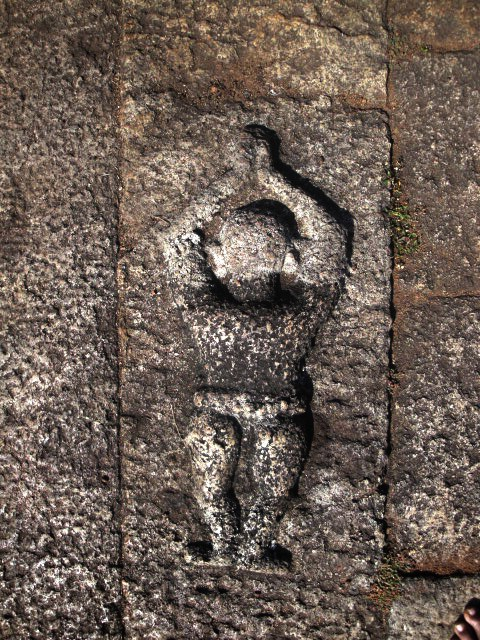
Raja of Chempakassery

In ancient times, the temple had 54,000 para paddy fields (Punja nilam). The soldiers of the Chembakassery Raja killed a Unni of the Changazhimuttam madom family at Venattukara in Kuttanad, who had gone there to gauge the "Pata Nelu" of Devaswom. The Brahmins of temple urazhma installed a brahma rakshas in the temple to satisfy the Brahma rakshas of Changazhimattum Unni. Additionally a hanging tree was erected in front of the Rakshas shrine and the statue of Raja of Chembakassery was hanged. But later, these forms were removed in the late 19th century. Chempakassery Raja offered pujas to the temple as a sign of repentance for killing Unni. Raja appointed the members of the Thiruvenkathapuram Warrior as the heirs of "Panthiradi Choru".

== Vazhappally copper plate ==
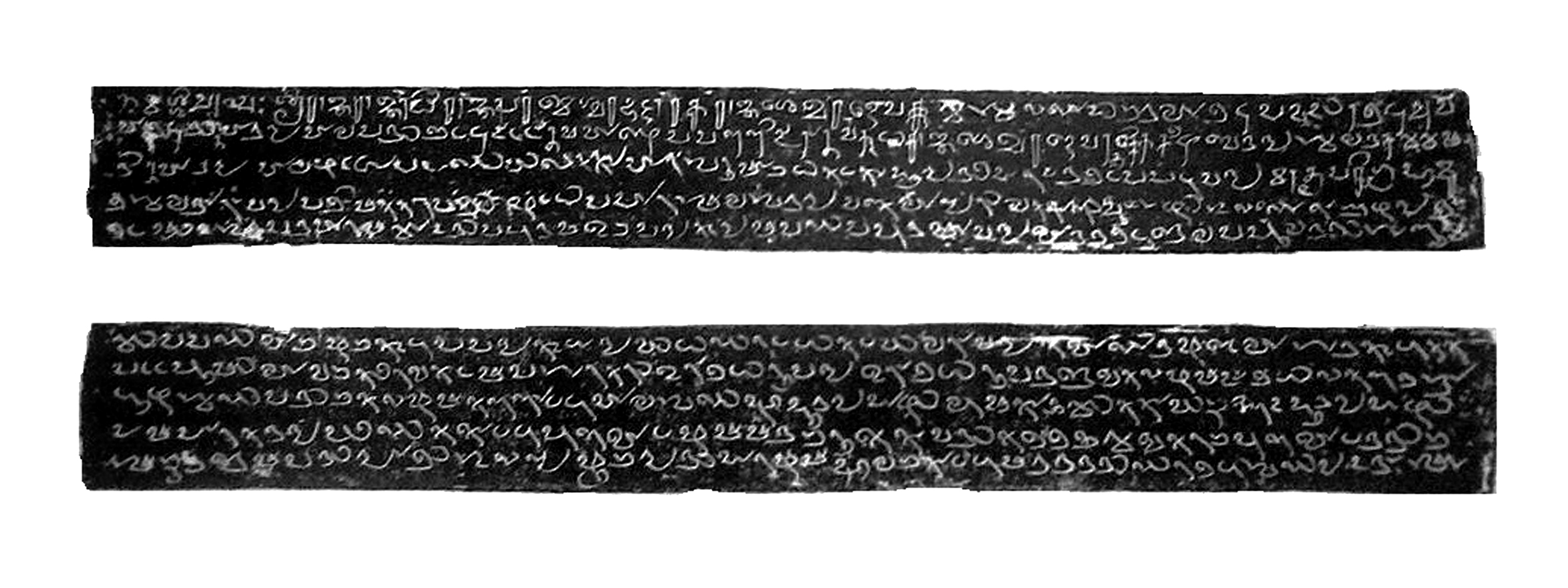
Vazhapalli copper plate (c. 830 CE) - single plate with writing on both sides.

Vazhappally copper plate, dated to early 9th century CE, is the earliest available inscription in Malayalam language. It is a temple committee resolution in the presence of the Chera king of Kodungallur Rama "Rajasekhara" (9th century CE) Rajasekhara is usually identified by scholars with Cheraman Perumal Nayanar, the venerated Shaiva (Nayanar) poet-musician.

The inscription (incomplete) is engraved in an old form of Malayalam in Vattezhuthu and Grantha scripts. It was inscribed in copper sheet and is an agreement between administrators of Vazhappally temple 18 citizens of a place and also describe the punishment if the temple rituals do not follow for Thiruvattuvai temple (Thiru Vazhappally Temple). This proclamation was understandably for strengthening the stature and status of Vazhappally and Vazhappally Siva temple

== Temple Gallery ==
Vazhappally Maha Siva Temple

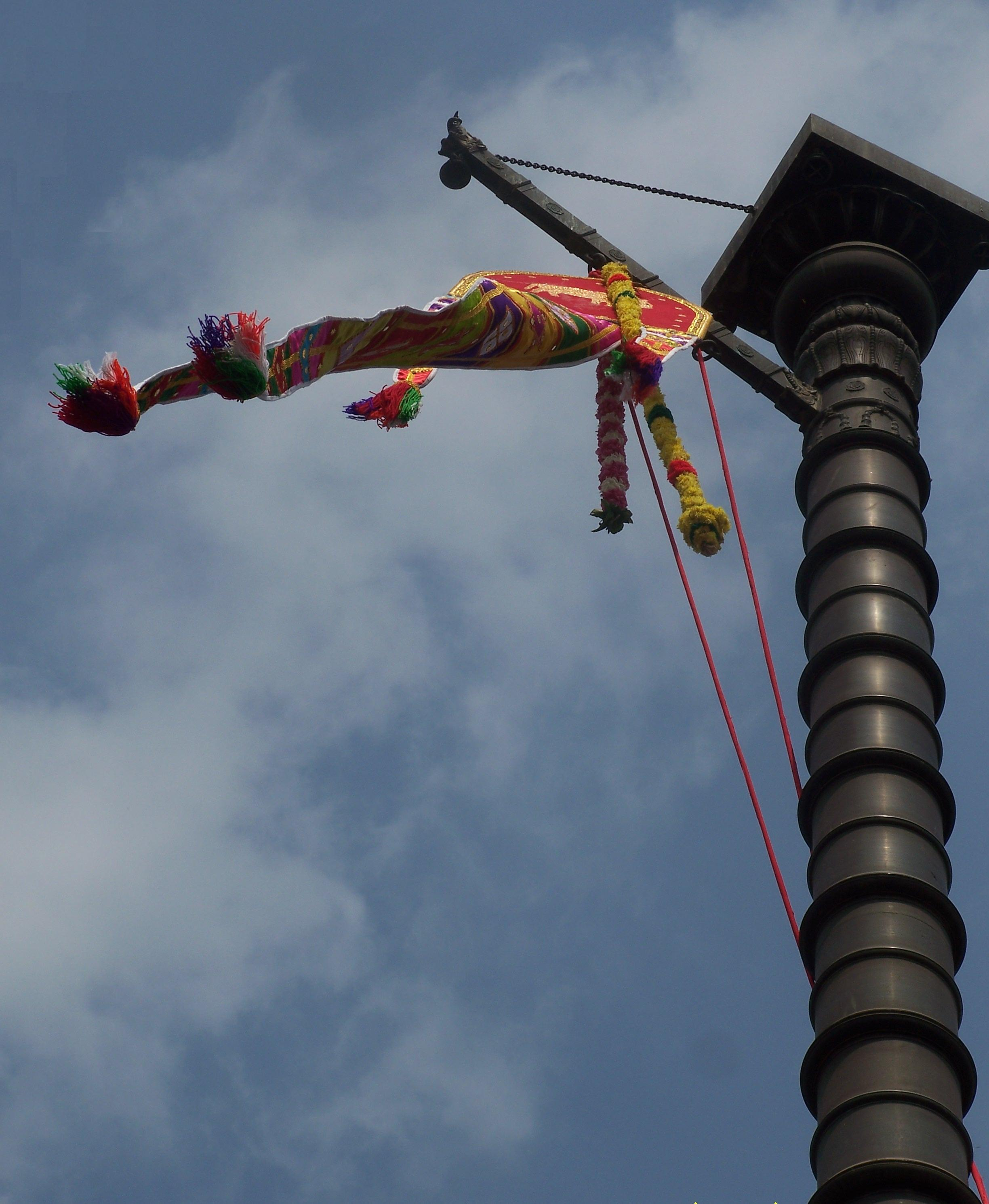
Flagmast

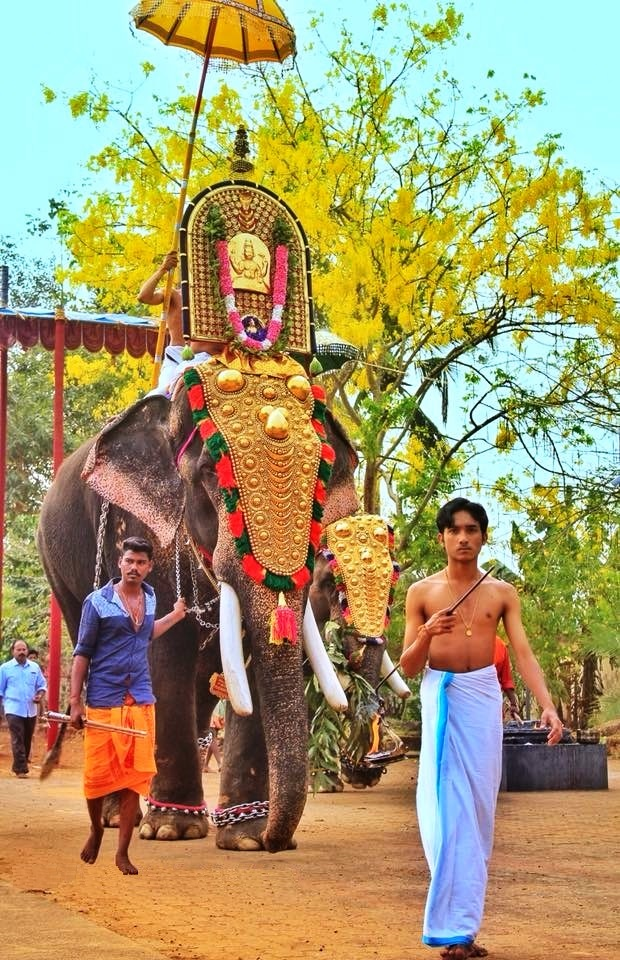
Morning Sreebali

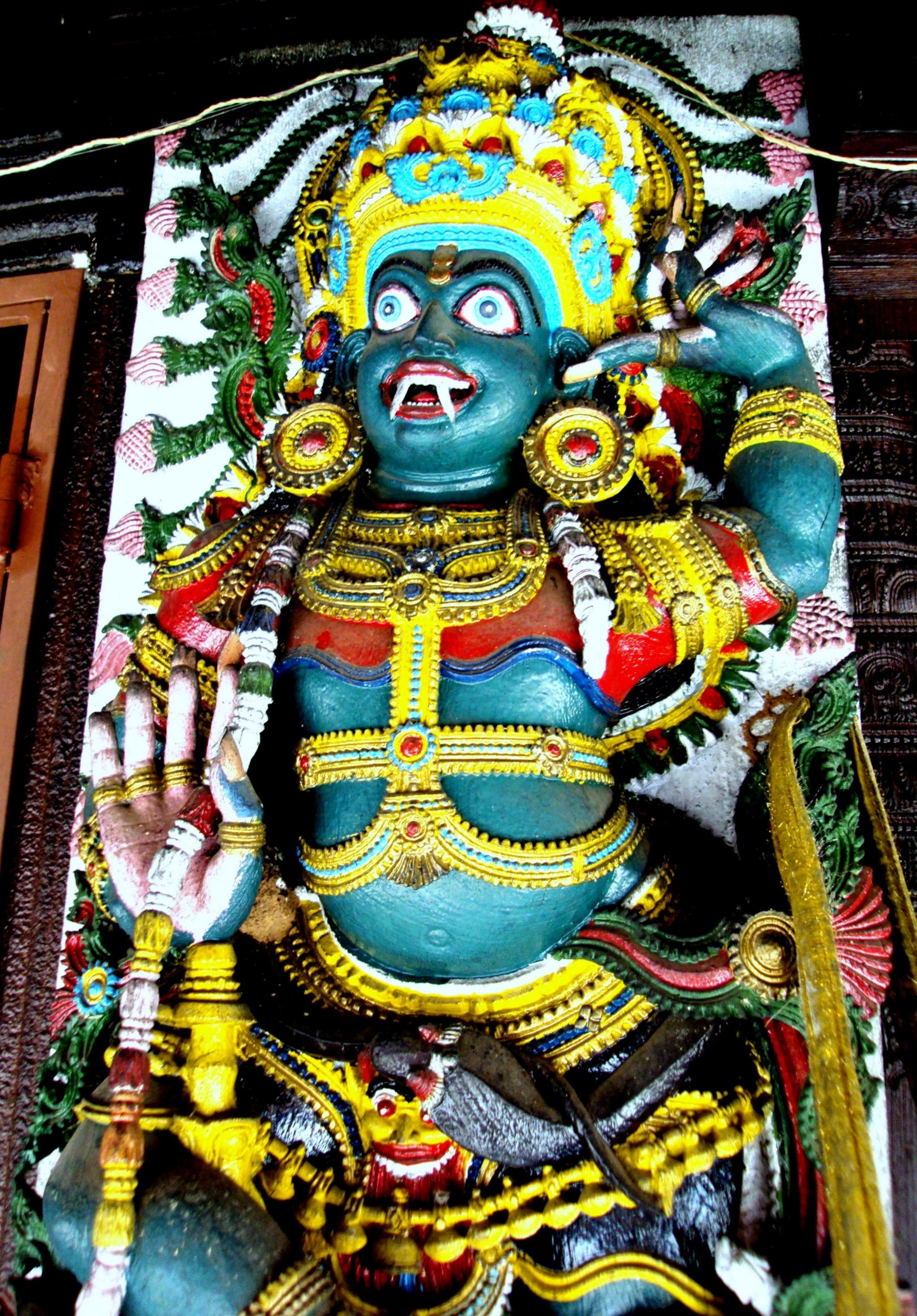
Dwarapalaka

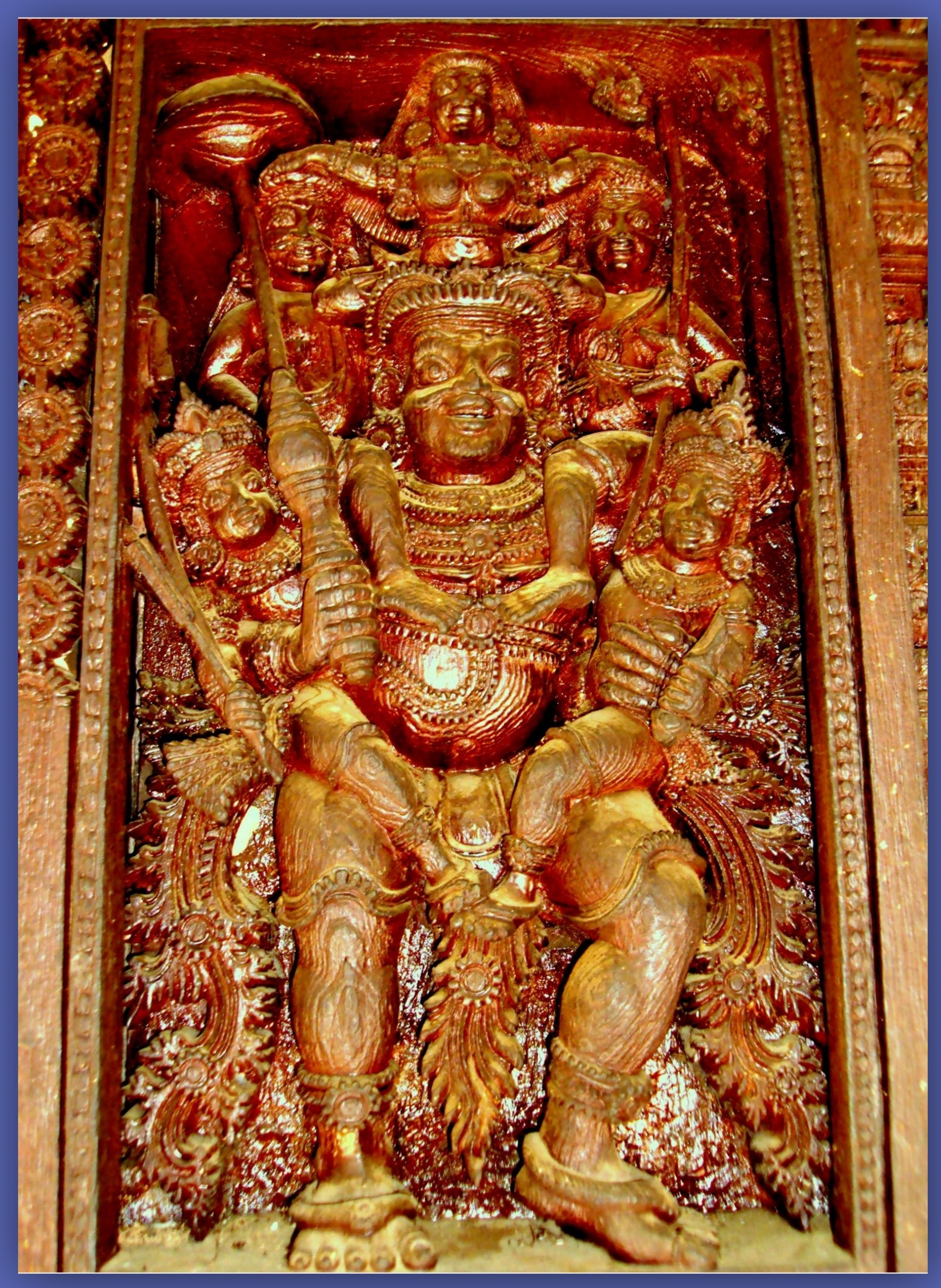
Mahabharata Storey

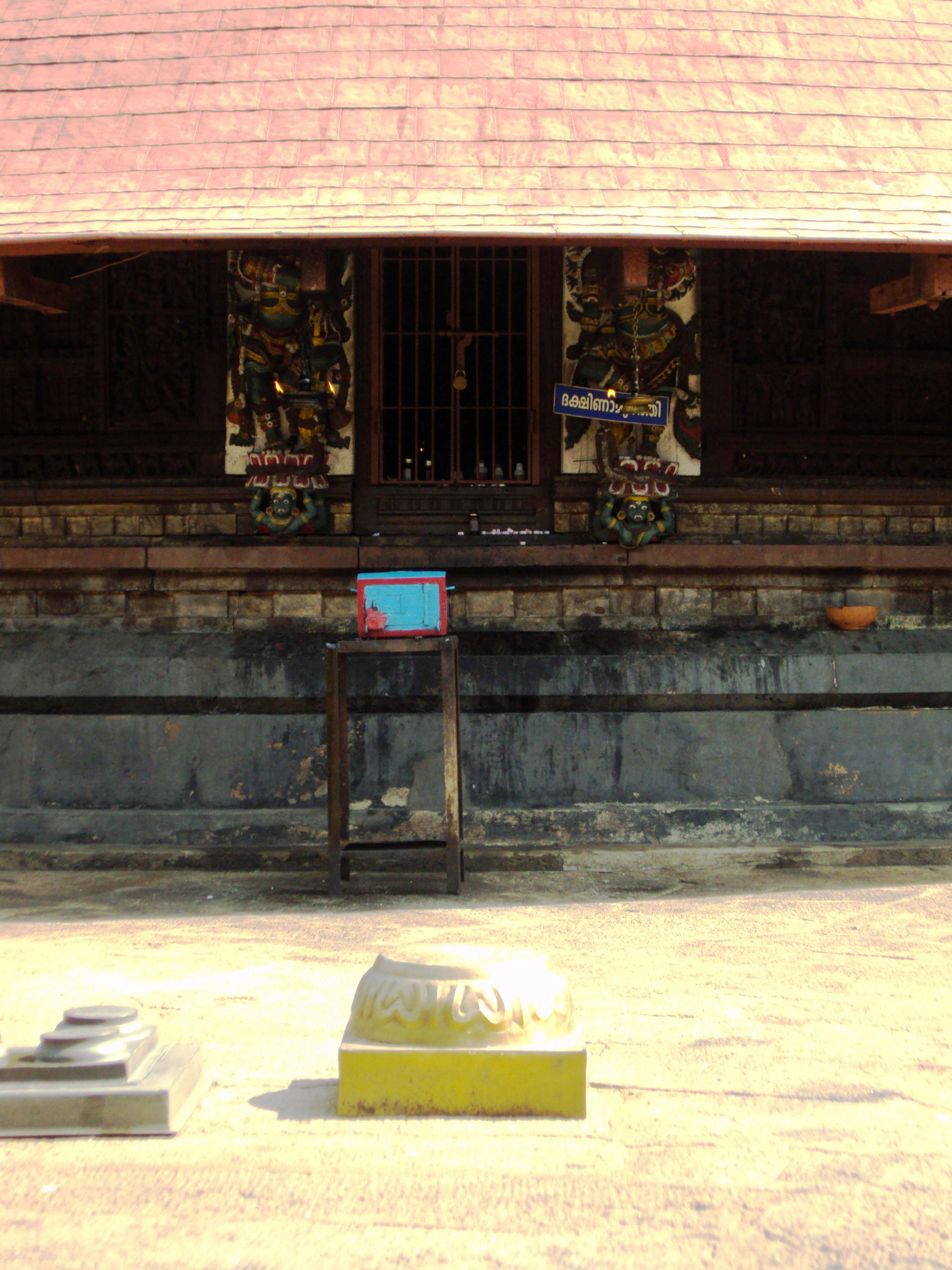
Sreekovil-South

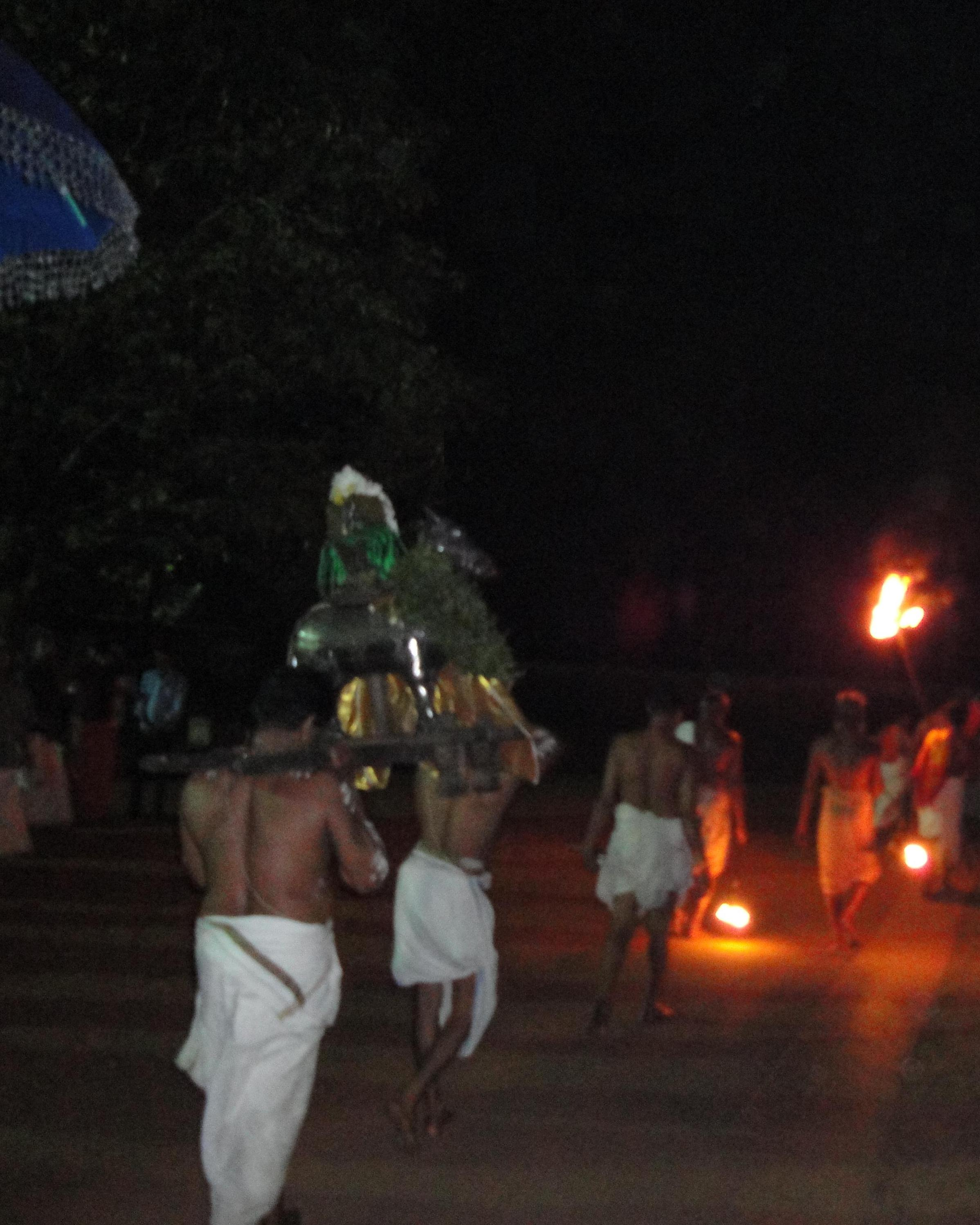
Night Sreebali

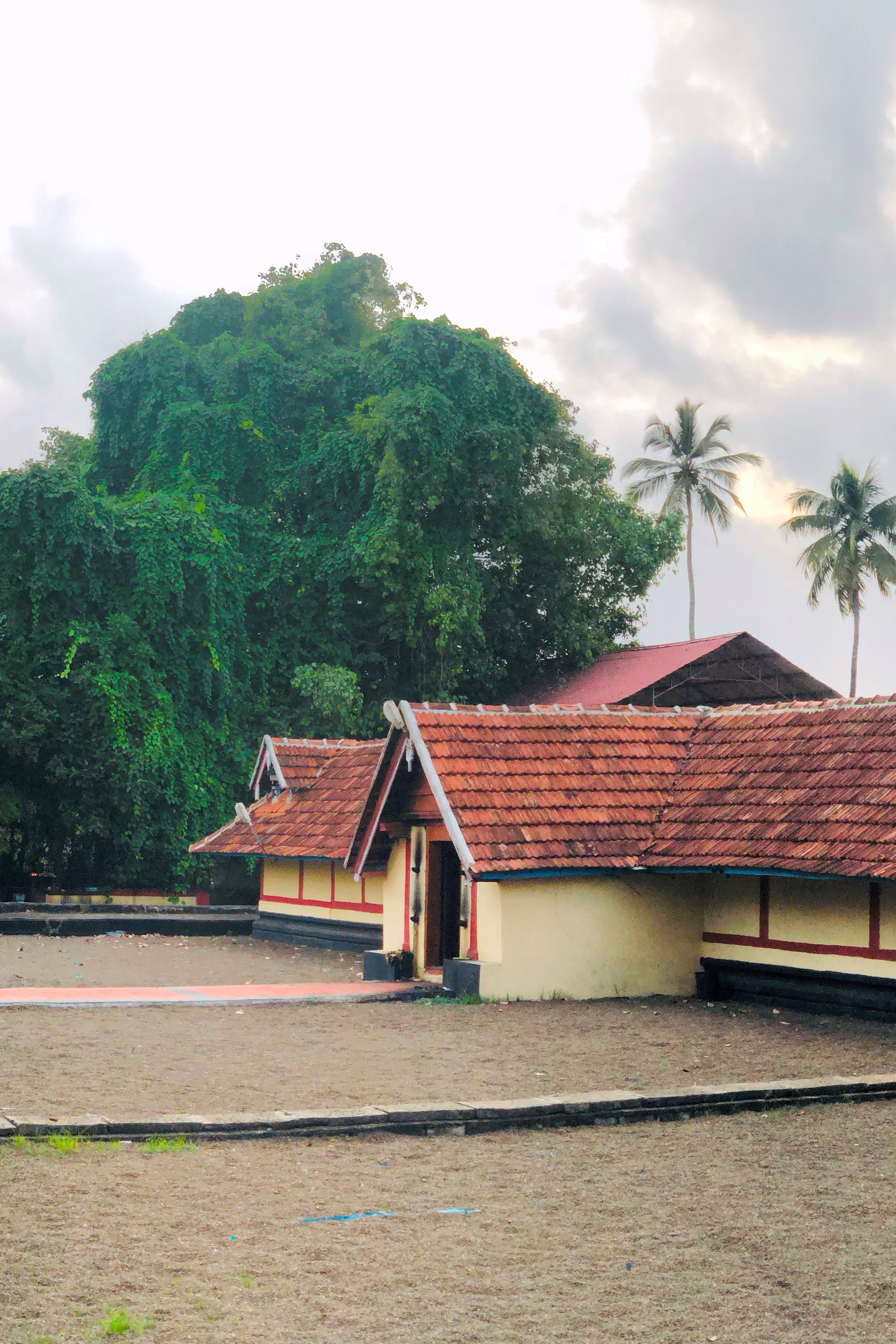

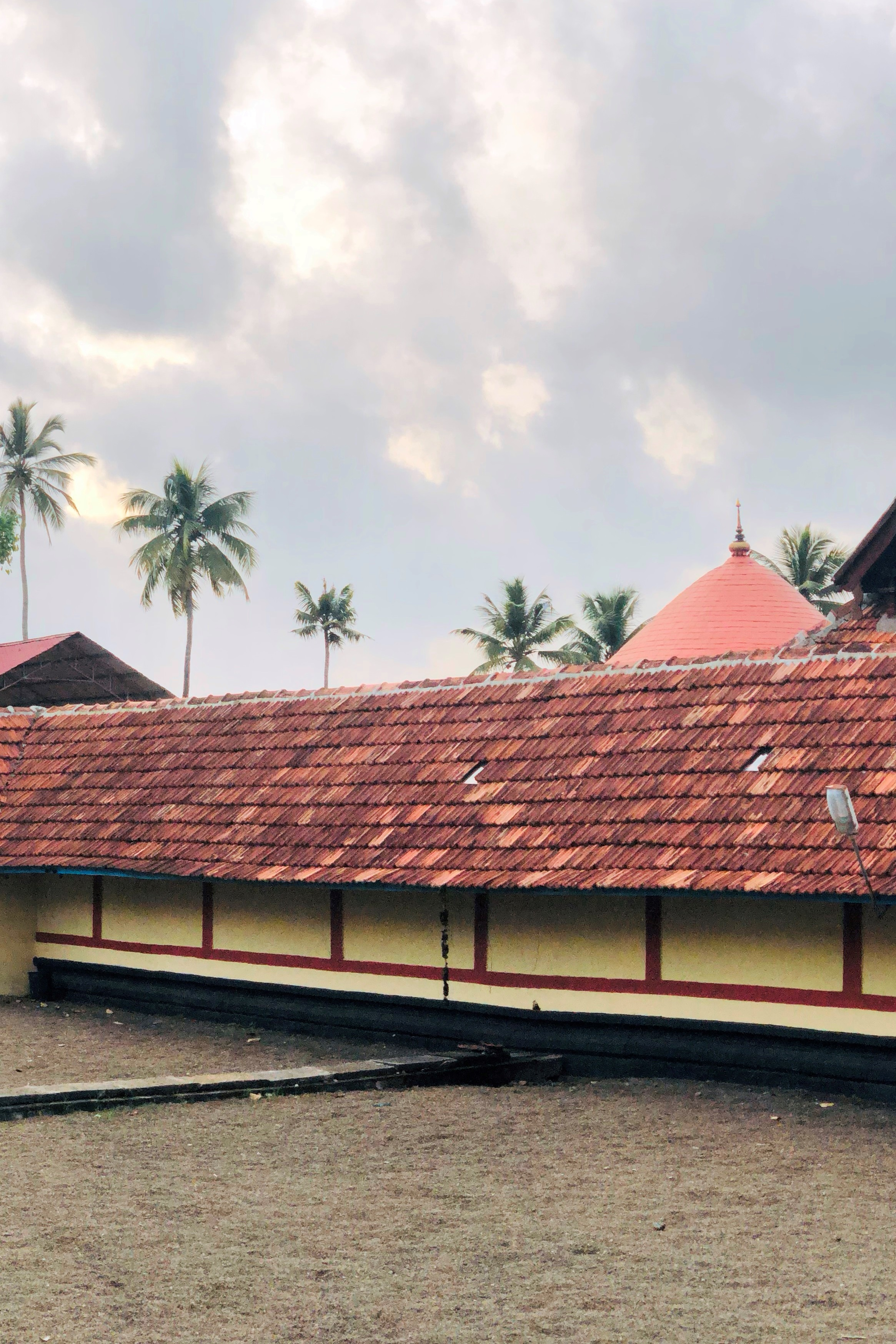

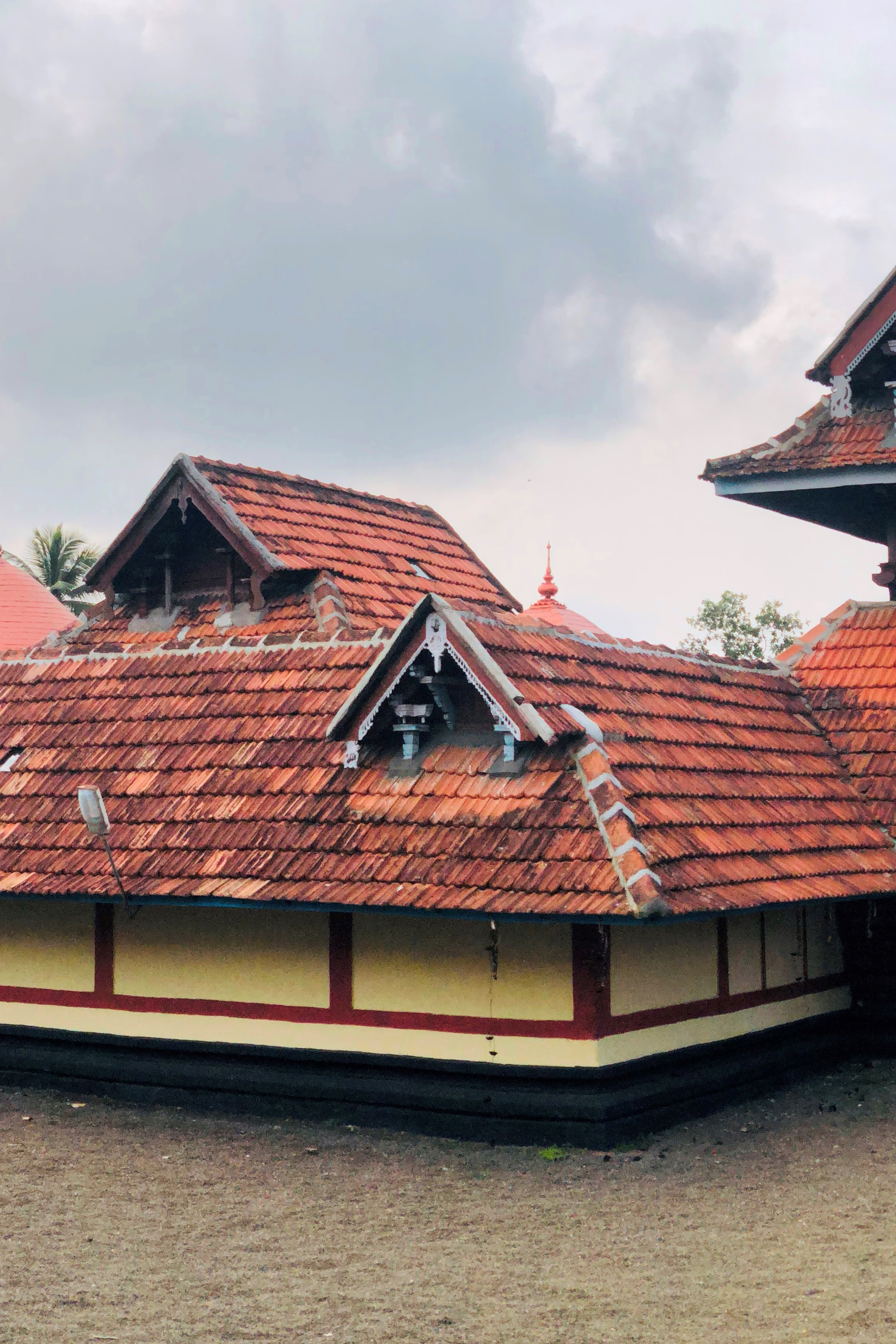

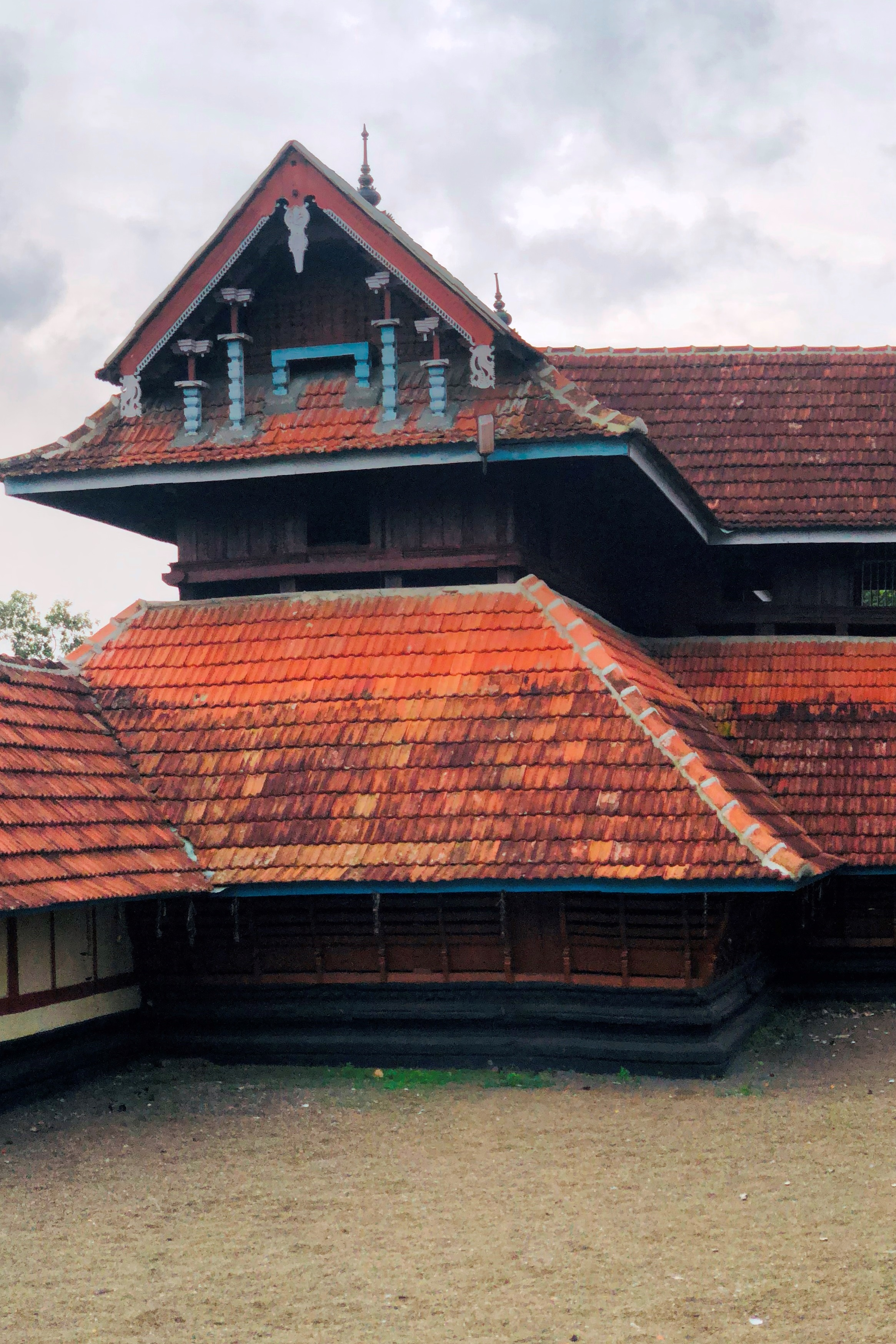

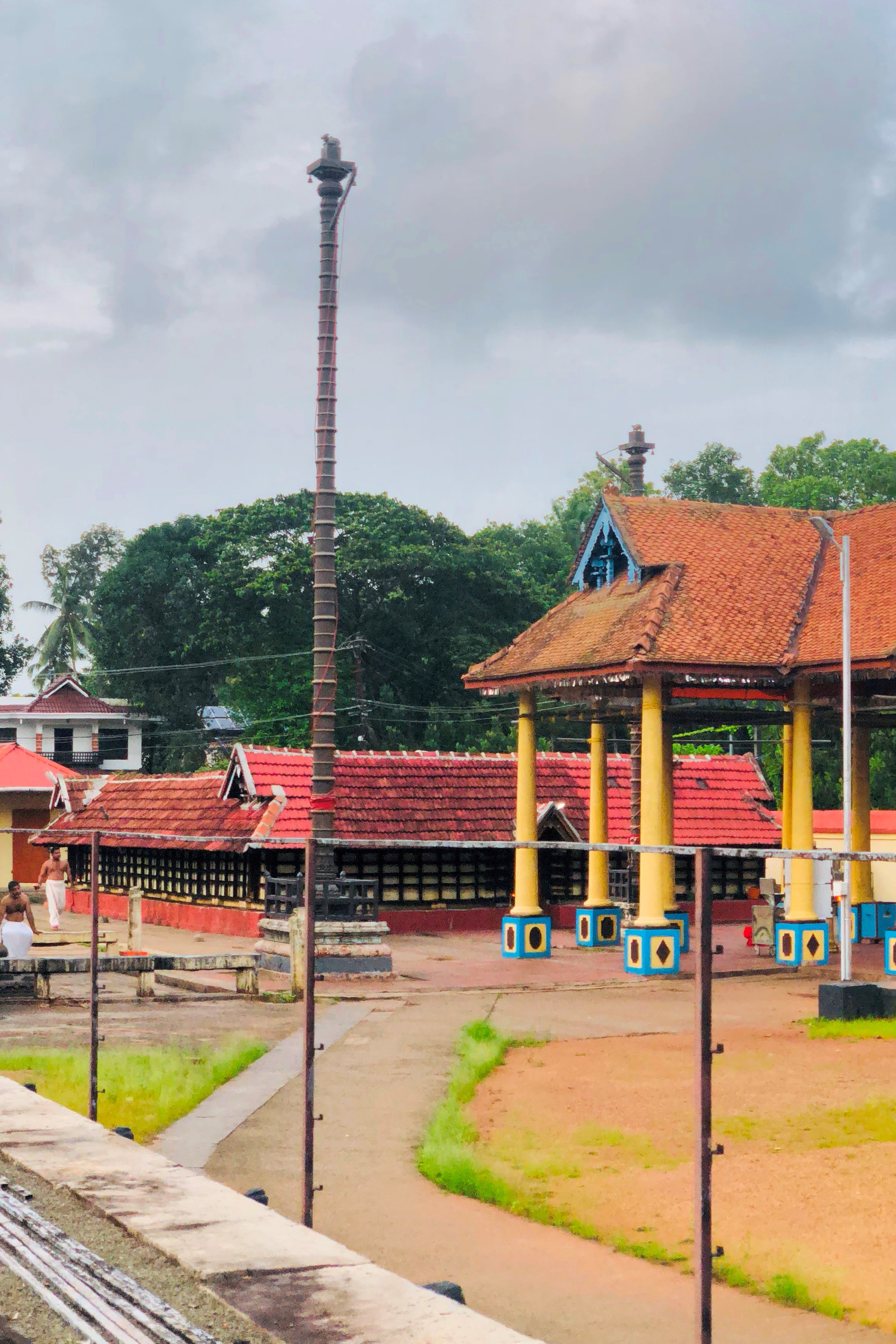

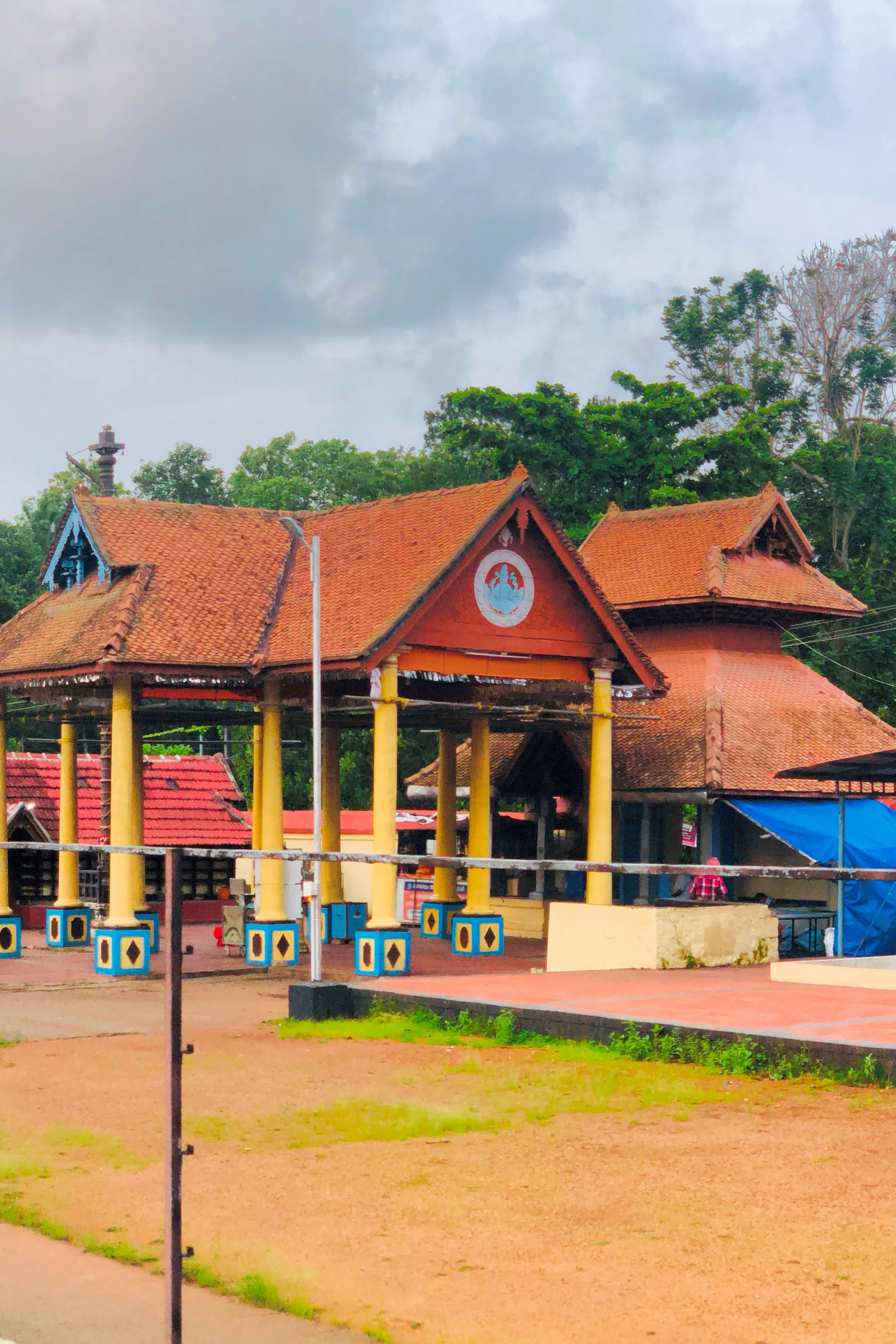
