= Syme =

Syme may refer to:

== People ==
- Arthur E. Syme (1863–1943), Australian medical doctor and racehorse owner
- Colin Syme (1903–1986), Australian medical administrator and innovator
- Connor Syme (born 1995), Scottish professional golfer
- Daniel Aweyue Syme, Ghanaian politician deputy government minister
- David Syme (1827–1908), Scottish-Australian newspaper proprietor of The Age
- David Syme (pianist) (born 1949), American pianist
- Don Syme, Australian computer scientist, creator of the F# programming language
- Ebenezer Syme (1826–1860), Scottish-Australian journalist, proprietor and manager of The Age
- Hugh Syme (GC) (1903–1965), Australian naval officer and bomb disposal operative, and employee of The Age
- Hugh Syme, Canadian musician and a Juno Award-winning graphic artist
- James Syme (1799–1870), pioneering Scottish surgeon
- James Thomson Syme (died 1883) co-owner Pirie Street Brewery in South Australia
- Jason Syme, Scottish rugby league and rugby union footballer who played in the 1990s and 2000s
- Jennifer Syme (1972–2001), American actress and production assistant
- John Syme (1795–1861), Scottish portrait-painter
- Julie Syme, community leader from Kaikōura, New Zealand
- Ronald Syme (1903–1989), New Zealand-born historian of ancient Rome and classicist
- William Smith Syme (1870–1928), Newfoundland-born laryngologist

== Fictional characters ==
- Syme, a minor character in George Orwell's Nineteen Eighty-Four
- Gabriel Syme, the protagonist in G. K. Chesterton's The Man Who Was Thursday

== Other uses ==
- Syme, Greece (Greek: Σύμη, also romanized as Symi), a Greek island and municipality
  - Battle of Syme
- Syme (mythology), a Greek mythological figure

== See also ==
- SymE toxin, regulated by SymR RNA
- Symes, a surname
- Sime (disambiguation)
