= Varakkal Devi Temple =

Hindu temple in Kerala, India

Varakkal Sri Durga Devi Temple
- Varakkal Sri Durga Devi Temple, West Hill, Kozhikode, Kerala

Religion
- Affiliation: Hinduism
- District: Kozhikode
- Deity: Durga Devi
- Festival: Navaratri

Location
- Location: Westhill, Kozhikode, Kerala-673005
- State: Kerala
- Country: India
- Coordinates: 11.289754°N 75.762186°E

Architecture
- Type: (Kerala style)
- Elevation: 35.69 m (117 ft)

Website
- https://indiapl.com/kerala/varakkal-devi-temple-297434

Varakkal Devi Temple is a Devi temple in Kozhikode district of Kerala.

The temple is located near the Bhat Road beach at a distance of 6 km from Kozhikode railway station, very close to NH17 towards Mangalore. It is 27 kilometers from Calicut International Airport.

== Varakkal Sri Durga Devi Temple offerings ==
- Mahanivedyam the most important ritual
- Pushpanjali
- Padivilakku
- Naivilakku
- Thrikalapooja
- Swayamvara Pushpanjali
- Santhana Gopala Pooja
- Ganapathy Homam
- Thilaka Homam

== Management ==
The temple is administered by Zamorin of Calicut.

== See also ==
- List of Hindu temples in Kerala
- Sabarimala
- Tali Shiva Temple
- Valayanad Devi Temple
- Azhakodi Devi Temple
