= Tali Shiva Temple =

Hindu temple in Kerala, India

Thali Shiva Temple, Kozhikode
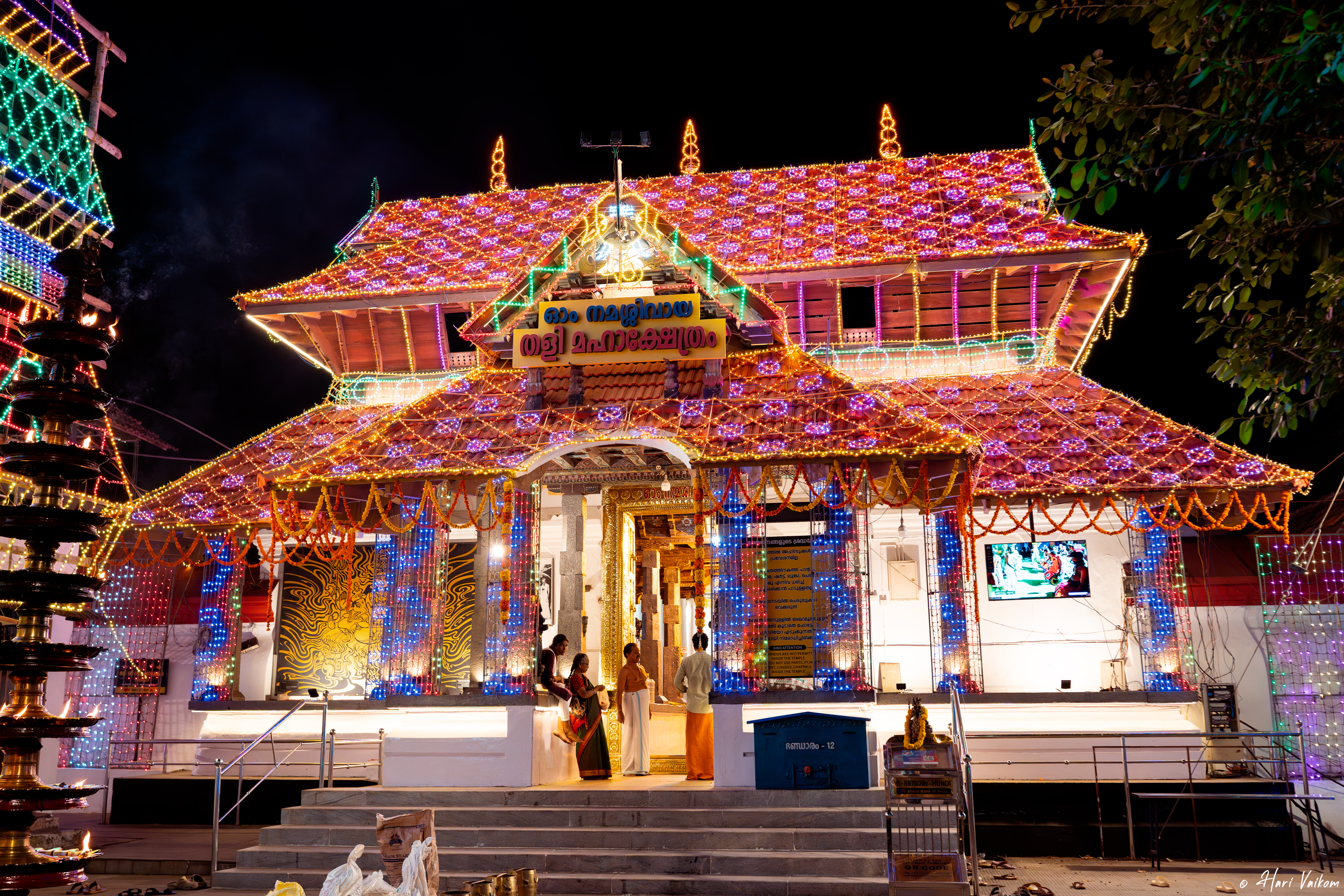
- Front view

- Location of Temple

Religion
- Affiliation: Hinduism
- District: Kozhikode district
- Deity: Shiva
- Festival: Maha Shivaratri

Location
- Location: Palayam
- State: Kerala
- Country: India
- Interactive map of Thali Shiva Temple, Kozhikode
- Coordinates: 11.247740°N 75.787338°E

Architecture
- Type: (Kerala style)

Website
- https://talimahakshethram.in/

Tali Shiva Temple or Tali Mahakshetram is a Hindu temple dedicated to the deity Shiva, situated in the heart of the Kozhikode city, Kerala. The temple was built in the 14th century by Zamorin of Calicut. Tali Kshetram is an ancient temple in the heart of Kozhikode town. Shiva is the presiding deity. The Jyothirlingam in the Sanctum Sanctorum is believed to have been installed by Parasuraman. The temple is one km to the east of Kozhikode railway station. It is surrounded by the Palayam market. This was the family temple of the Zamorins who had ruled Kozhikode. Although the temple is now under Malabar Devaswom, the Zamorin is the managing trustee. The temple is built in traditional Kerala architectural style. The two-storied sanctum-sanctorum is in the shape of a chariot. It is adorned with murals and granite sculptures of Shiva’s retinue. Inside Sree Kovil deities of Tali Ganapathy, Thevarathil Ganapathy and Thrumandhakunnu Bhagavathy are installed. Sree Krishna, Thevarathil Bhagavathy, Ayyappa, Sri Vishnu and Nagam are installed outside Shiva Temple. Sree Valayanad Bhagavati idol is installed inside Sree Krishna Temple. There is a small Narasimha Moorthy temple on the southern side of the Sri Vishnu Temple.

== History ==
Tali temple is one of the oldest temples in Kozhikode. The temple was built by Swamy Thirumulapad. The founding and prosperity of Kozhikode city is closely linked with the sanctity of this ancient temple. It is believed that the lingam in the sanctum of the Temple was installed towards the end of Dvapara Yuga by Sri. Parasurama. The posture in the sanctum is that of Umamaheswara. Though this divine power existed from time immemorial, the attention of the citizens of Kozhikode was (bestowed on the temple) only by about 1500 years ago. Later on the temple reached its zenith during the rule of the Zamorin of Calicut,(also known as Samoothiri)who had the prestigious title Sailabdheswara. The temple to its present state was built in the 14th century. The temple was almost damaged when Tipu Sultan invaded Kozhikode in the 18th century. Again the shrine was renovated in 1964. Revathi Pattathanam function started at this temple. Eminent people and philosophers came to this function. Bharatha Meemamsa, Prabhakara Meemamsa, Vedanta Meemamsa and Vyakarana were discussed at the functions. During the 15th and 16th centuries, eighteen poets came to this function. This function also takes place at present. Some historians believe the temple was made even before the city was built.

== Significance ==
The Tali Shiva Temple is historically important. It is a treasure house with numerous deities and beautiful built.This is a two storied sanctum. It is in the chariot form and is decorated with mural paintings.The temple is protected by large walls on all sides, which are in the form of an elephant belly. Also, there are fine granite sculptures within the temple complex. These sculptures show Shiva. Also, birds and animal sculptures are present. These portray different stories from the Puranas.Moreover, there is a Jyotirlingam in the sanctum. 5 of the 12 Jyotirlingas are located in and around Pune in Maharashtra. Umamaheshwara, Tali Ganapathy, Thevarathil Ganapathy and Thrumandhakunnu Bhagavathy are also there within the inner walls. The outer walls have deities of Ayyappa, Thevarathil Bhagavathy and Naga.There is a separate Vishnu temple within the complex. The temple also has its own Dwajastambam.The idol of Sreevalayanad Bhagavati is also present in the Vishnu temple.There is another small temple. The presiding deity is Narasimha Moorthy. This temple is at the southern part of the Vishnu Temple.The northern part has the Eranjipuram. It is also beautiful with lights from all sides.The main temple has four main parts. The Dwajastambam refers to the flag poles. People also believe these are connections of heaven to earth. The Anakottil is the flag staff platform. It was built for the elephants. The gopurams are large. These gateways are another treat to eyes with intricate carvings, while the Deepasthambhum is the beautiful lighting pillars.The various temples within the complex are Sivakshetram, Nalambalam and Krishnakshetram.

== Festivals celebrated ==
- Maha Shivratri
- Revathi Pattathanam: This festival still takes place at the temple. This cultural program is a seven days function. It is during October or November. As per myth, the Zamorins started the festival as a penance of killing the Namboothiris. Performing scholars also get rewards.
- The largest festival is during the Malayalam New Year. The festival is for seven days. People worship Shiva during this time.

== Thali Maha Kshetram ceremonies ==
- Morning: 4:30 AM to 11:00 AM
- Evening: and 5:00 PM to 8:30 PM

== Thali Maha Kshetram sub-deities ==
- Tali Ganapathy
- Thevarathil Ganapathy
- Thrumandhakunnu Bhagavathy
- Sree Krishna
- Thevarathil Bhagavathy
- Ayyappa
- Vishnu
- Nagam
- Sree Valayanad Bhagavati
- Narasimha Moorthy

== Access ==
The site can be reached from the Kozhikode International Airport (23 km) and the Kozhikode railway station.

People with jeans and western dress cannot enter the temple. Traditional dress (veshti or mundu) can be rented from the temple counter.

Under the caste system prior to the Independence of India in 1947, only Namboothiris, Kshatriyas, Ambalavasis and Nairs were allowed in the temple, but it has since been open to all Hindu castes.

== See also ==
- Valayanad Devi Temple
- Azhakodi Devi Temple
- Varakkal Devi Temple
