= Sime =

Sime is a surname which traces back to the Clan Fraser, and the name Shimidh, Gaelic for Simon. Notable people with the surname include:

- Abrham Sime, Ethiopian runner
- Alemu Sime, Ethiopian politician
- Charlie Sime, Australian rules footballer
- Dave Sime (1936–2016), American athlete
- Dawn Sime, Australian artist
- Elias Sime, Ethiopian artist and sculptor
- George Sime, British and Scottish field hockey player
- James Sime, Scottish biologist, literary critic, and historian
- Jessie Sime, Scottish-born Canadian novelist
- Joanna Sime, British gymnast
- John Sime, Scottish trade union leader
- Mezgebu Sime, Ethiopian runner
- Ruth Lewin Sime (1939–), American author
- Sidney Sime (1867–1941), British artist
- William Sime, South African-born English barrister, judge, and cricketer

== Given name ==
- Agnes Sime Baxter, Canadian-born mathematician
- David Robert Sime Cumming, Scottish engineer
- David Sime Cargill, Scottish businessman
- Sime Nugent, Australian musician
- Sime Seruya (1876–1955), Portuguese actress, suffragist and socialist who campaigned in Britain
- Sime Silverman (1877–1933), founder of the show business publication Variety

== Other uses ==
- Ivory and Sime, a British investment management company
- Sime Darby, a Malaysian company
  - Sime Darby Harvard Championship
  - Sime Darby LPGA Malaysia
  - Sime Darby Property
  - Sime UMW
- The Sime~Gen Universe, a fictional literary universe created by Jacqueline Lichtenberg
- Security Intelligence Middle East (SIME), a British intelligence organization in the Middle East during the Second World War

== See also ==
- Šime (disambiguation)
