= Keezhtali Mahadeva Temple =

Hindu temple, Kalady, India

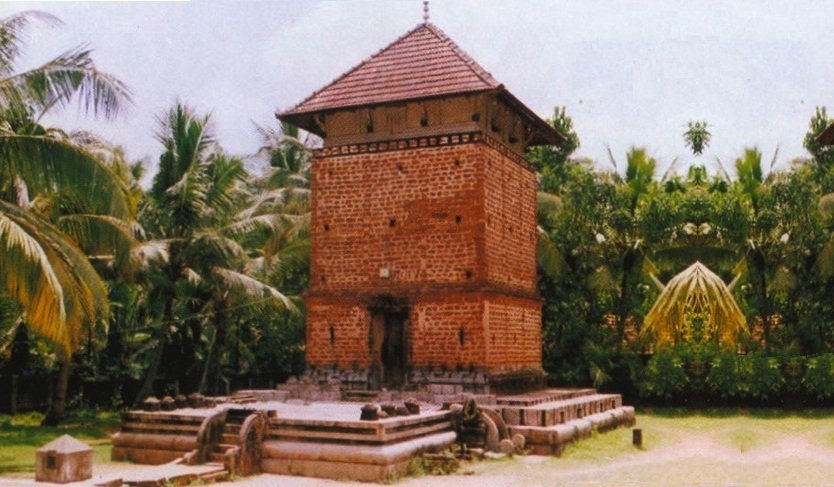
- Temple sanctom sanctorum

Religion
- Affiliation: Hinduism
- District: Thrissur
- Deity: Shiva
- Festival: Maha Shivaratri

Location
- Location: Kodungalloor
- State: Kerala
- Country: India
- Interactive map of Keezhtali Mahadeva Temple
- Coordinates: 10.208283710686514°N 76.20271936543362°E

Architecture
- Type: Kerala style
- Completed: Not known
- Monument: 1

Keezhtali Mahadeva Temple is an ancient Hindu temple dedicated to Shiva situated in Kodungalloor of Thrissur District in Kerala state in India; it was one of the important temples in Chera Kingdom, being one of a complex of 108. According to folklore, sage Parashurama himself installed the idol of Shiva. The temple is one of the four thali temples mentioned in the 108 Shiva temples (1. Tali Temple, Kozhikkode, 2. Kaduthruthy Mahadeva Temple, Kottayam, 3. Keezhtali Mahadeva Temple, Kodungallur, 4. Talikotta Mahadeva Temple, Kottayam). The temple is also known as the Keetholi Temple.

== History ==
Ancient Kerala and its administrative structures had been carried out in certain temples known as thalis. Keehi, Arattali, Meltali, Nediyathali, and Chingpuruthu were five such in the Chera Kingdom. (The Melthali Temple has not yet been discovered –it may have been on a river. Arathali is believed to be in the temples of Kottarithi near Thiruvanchikkulam.)

== Festival and daily pooja ==
Three poojas held here on a regular basis: usha, noon, and athazha. The shivaratri festival of the temple is usually celebrated in the month of Malayalam Kumbha (February - March).

== Temple Structure ==
Keezhtali Mahadeva Temple is the largest Shivalinga temple in Kerala state. It is one of the few Hindu temples where were destroyed during the Mysore Sultan Tipu's campaign.
