= Lilydale, Victoria =

Lilydale
- Suburb
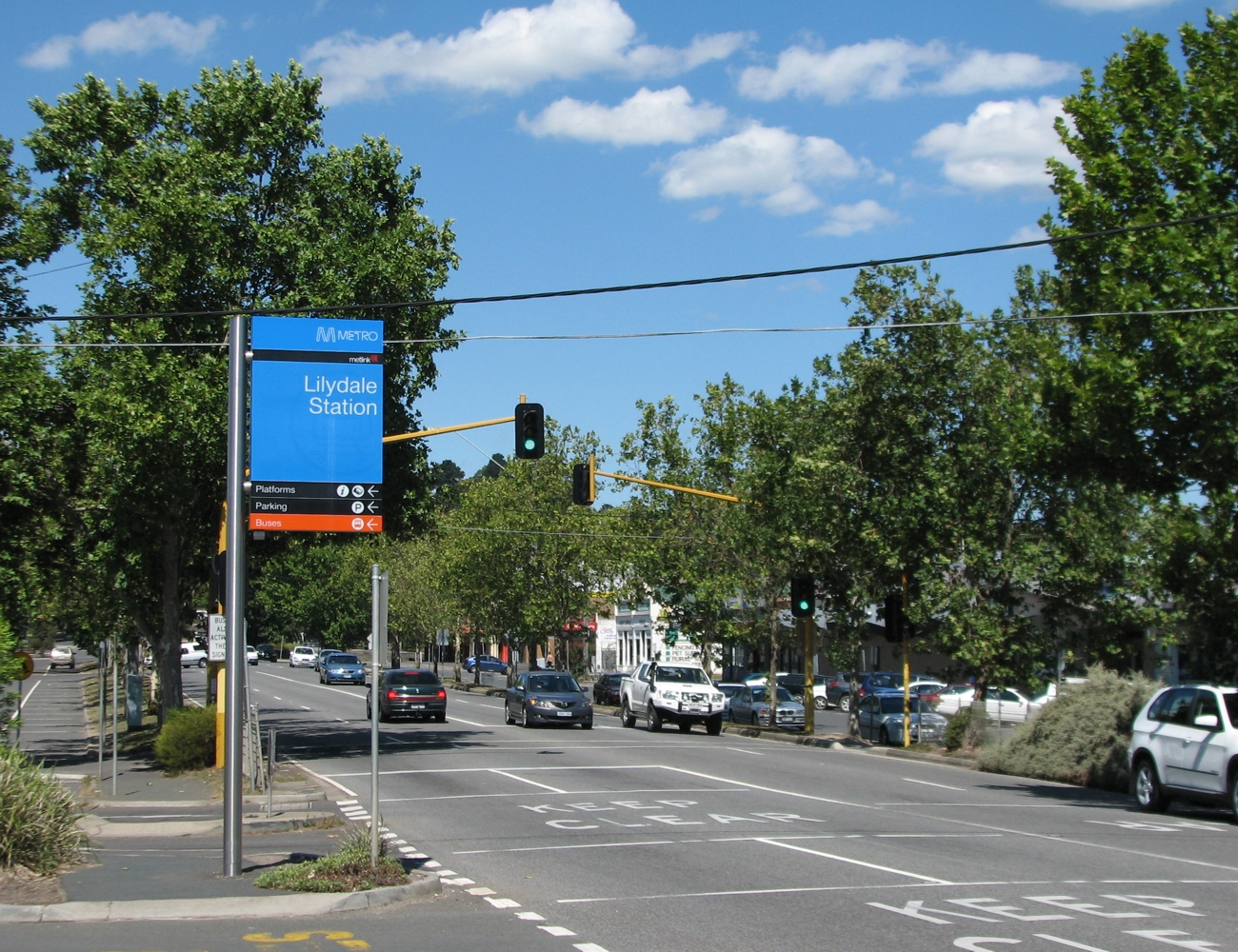
- Main Street (Maroondah Highway), Lilydale before train station redevelopment

- Interactive map of Lilydale
- Coordinates: 37.758°S 145.350°E
- Country: Australia
- State: Victoria
- City: Melbourne
- LGA: Shire of Yarra Ranges
- Location: 34 km (21 mi) from Melbourne CBD

Government
  - State electorate: Evelyn
  - Federal division: Casey

Area
  - Total: 29.2 km^{2} (11.3 sq mi)
- Elevation: 115 m (377 ft)

Population
  - Total: 17,348 (2021 census)
  - Density: 594.1/km^{2} (1,538.7/sq mi)
- Postcode: 3140
Suburbs around Lilydale
Chirnside Park	Coldstream	Gruyere
Chirnside Park	Lilydale	Wandin North
Mooroolbark	Montrose	Mount Evelyn

Lilydale is an outer eastern suburb of Melbourne, Victoria, Australia, 34 km east from Melbourne's central business district, located within the Shire of Yarra Ranges local government area. Lilydale recorded a population of 17,348 at the 2021 census.

Situated in the Yarra Valley, it began as a town within the former Shire of Lillydale and is also notable as the burial site of Dame Nellie Melba (Lilydale Cemetery).

It is both a residential area of metropolitan Melbourne and an industrial area on the city's rural-urban fringe.

== Toponymy ==
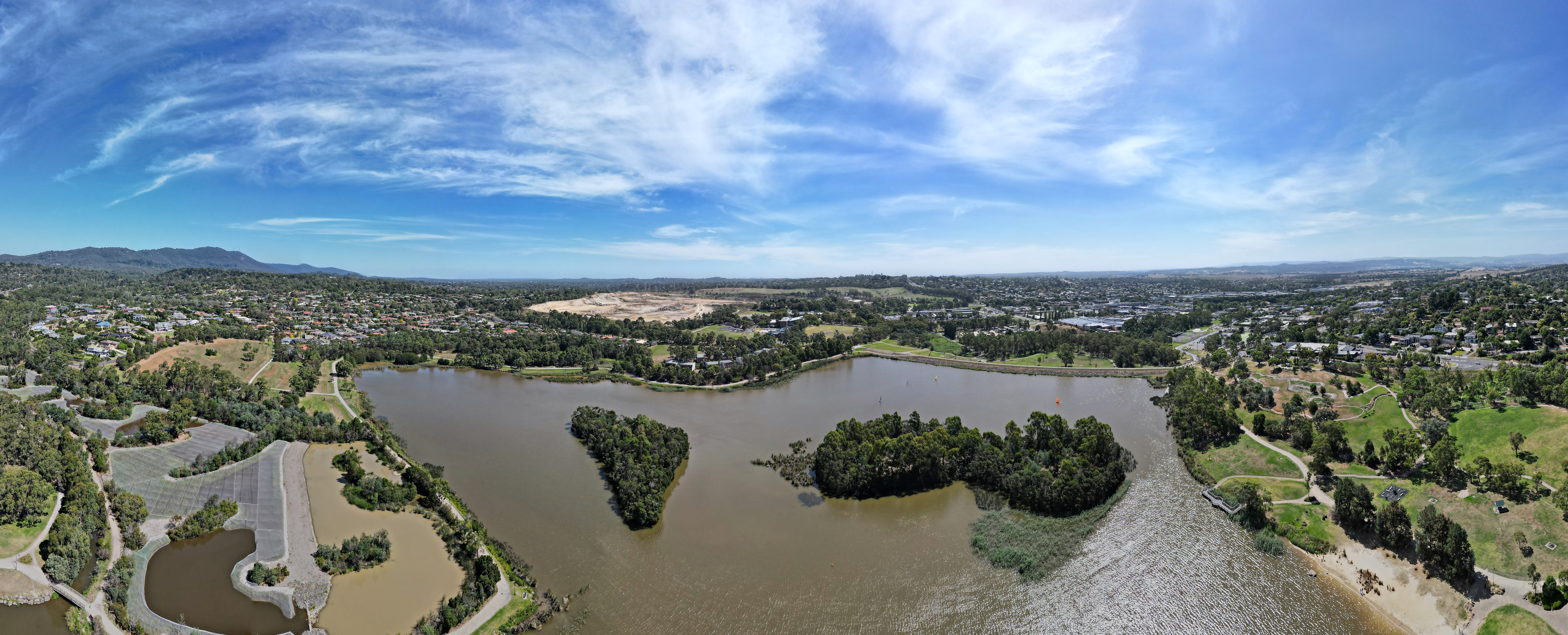
Lillydale Lake aerial panorama. February 2023

Whilst speculated that the town was named after an 1852 song "Lilly Dale" by H. S. Thompson, evidence shows it was named after an early settler, Lilly de Castella.

Most of Victoria has been named after prominent citizens or with traditional Aboriginal names. Lilly de Castella was one of four daughters of Lieutenant-Colonel Joseph Anderson and his wife Mary.

Joseph Anderson was one of eight nominated (non-elected) members of the Victorian Legislative Assembly. Lilly was born Elizabeth Anne on Norfolk Island, where her father was commandant from 1835 to 1839. Lilly was a typical Victorian pet-name for girls named Elizabeth.

The family settled in South Yarra in 1848. Lilly married Paul de Castella in 1856; Lieutenant-Colonel Anderson co-owned the couple's Yering Station. Anderson Street in Lilydale was named after the Colonel, and the parallel Castella Street was named after his son-in-law, Lilly's husband Paul.

== History ==
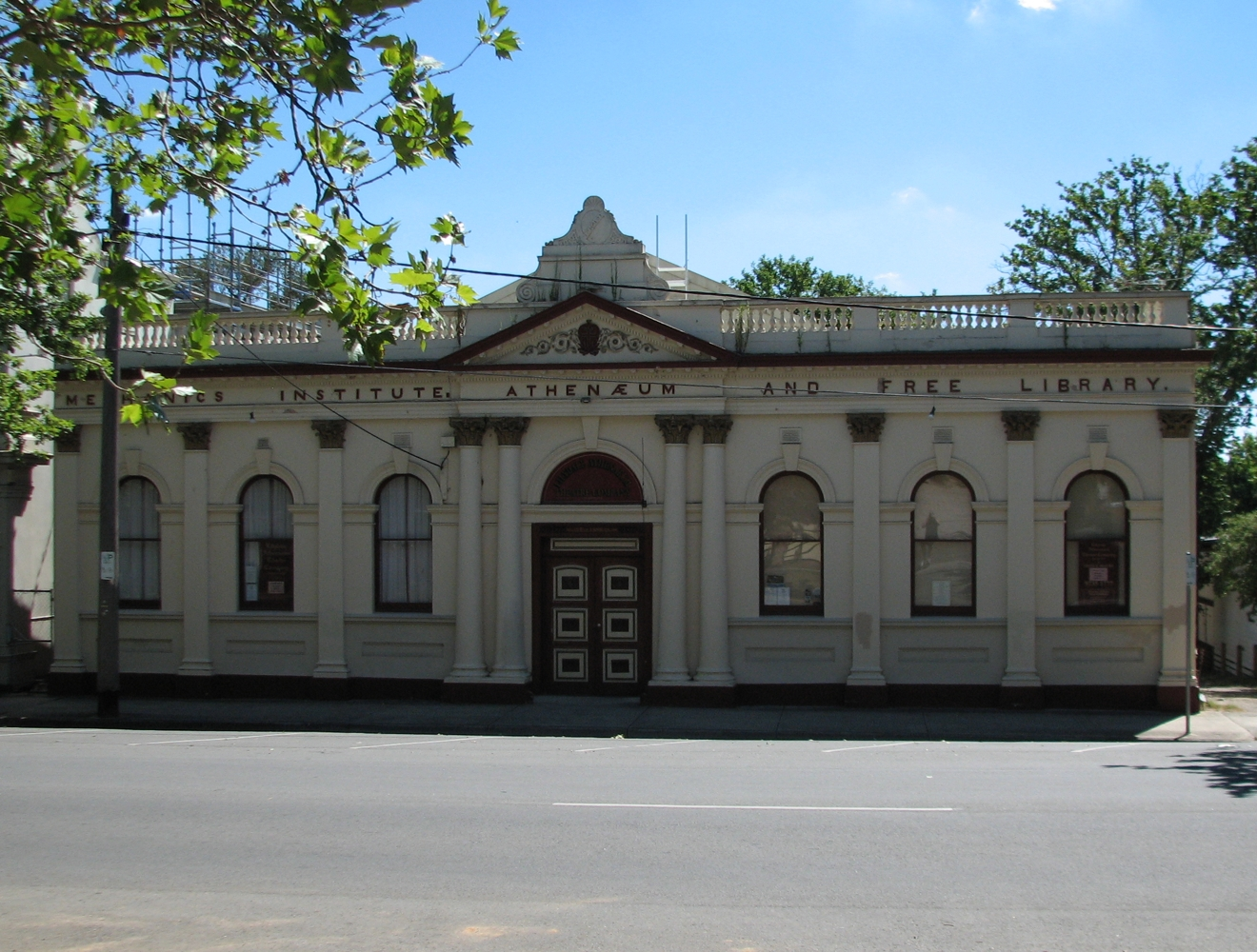
The 1888 Mechanics Institute

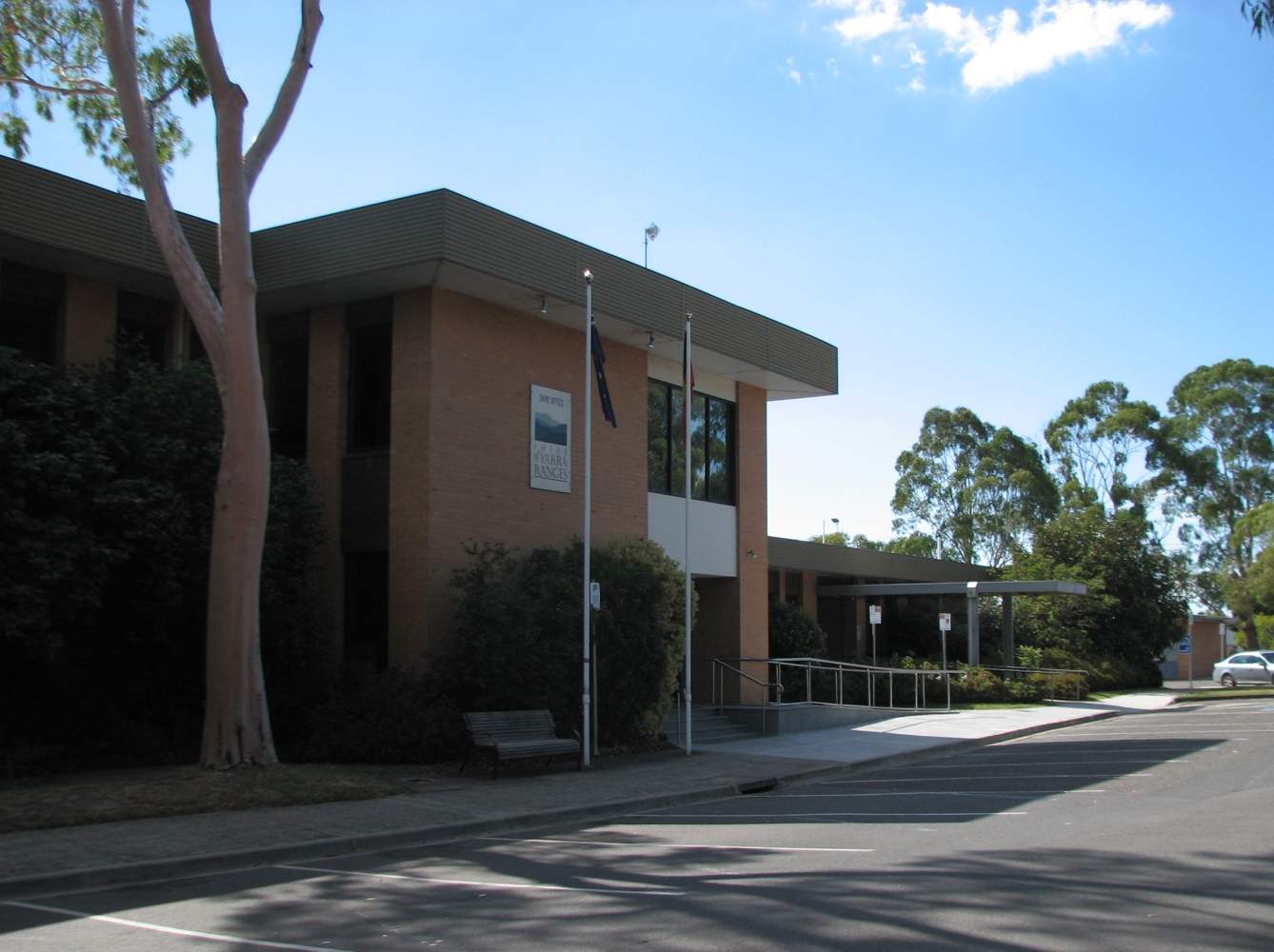
Shire of Yarra Ranges Offices, Lilydale (building prior to 2010s-20s overhaul and extension)

Lilydale sits on Wurundjeri Country, traditionally part of the Kulin Nation.

Lillydale township was surveyed in 1860 by Clement Hodgkinson.

The Post Office opened on 1 September 1860 as Brushy Creek, and was renamed Lillydale in 1861 and Lilydale around 1872.

The Lilydale Hotel opened in 1862. The railway came to town with the opening of the station in 1882. The first town hall was built in 1888 along with the Mechanics Institute Free Library building.

Lilydale has an active Country Fire Authority volunteer fire brigade, first established in 1905. There was an unregistered brigade dating back to the 1880s prior to this. The brigade also has a satellite station in Chirnside Park.

=== Heritage listings ===
The following places in Lilydale are listed on the Victorian Heritage Register:

- Cave Hill Limestone Quarry, 4 Melba Avenue, redeveloped as the Kinley housing estate
- Lilydale railway station refreshment rooms, 99 Main Street
- The Towers, Lilydale, 6–10 The Eyrie

== Commercial area ==
Lilydale is home to two shopping centres, Lilydale Village and Lilydale Marketplace as well as shops on both sides of Main Street. Lilydale Marketplace is located on Hutchinson Street within walking distance of a bus stop and the Lilydale railway station. It has three major anchor tenants: Woolworths, Big W, and Aldi, as well as dozens of specialty stores. In 2020, a man wielding a knife stormed into Lilydale Marketplace, got into a standoff with police and was shot by police. He was given first aid and survived. This incident led to all Victoria Police officers now being equipped with tasers.

== Transport ==
Lilydale station is the terminus for the Lilydale railway line offering half hourly metropolitan rail services. It was rebuilt in November 2021 as part of the Level Crossing Removal Project, with the railway line being raised above Maroondah Highway. The original 1882 station building has been preserved in its original location, with the current station and bus interchange located on the opposite side of the highway.

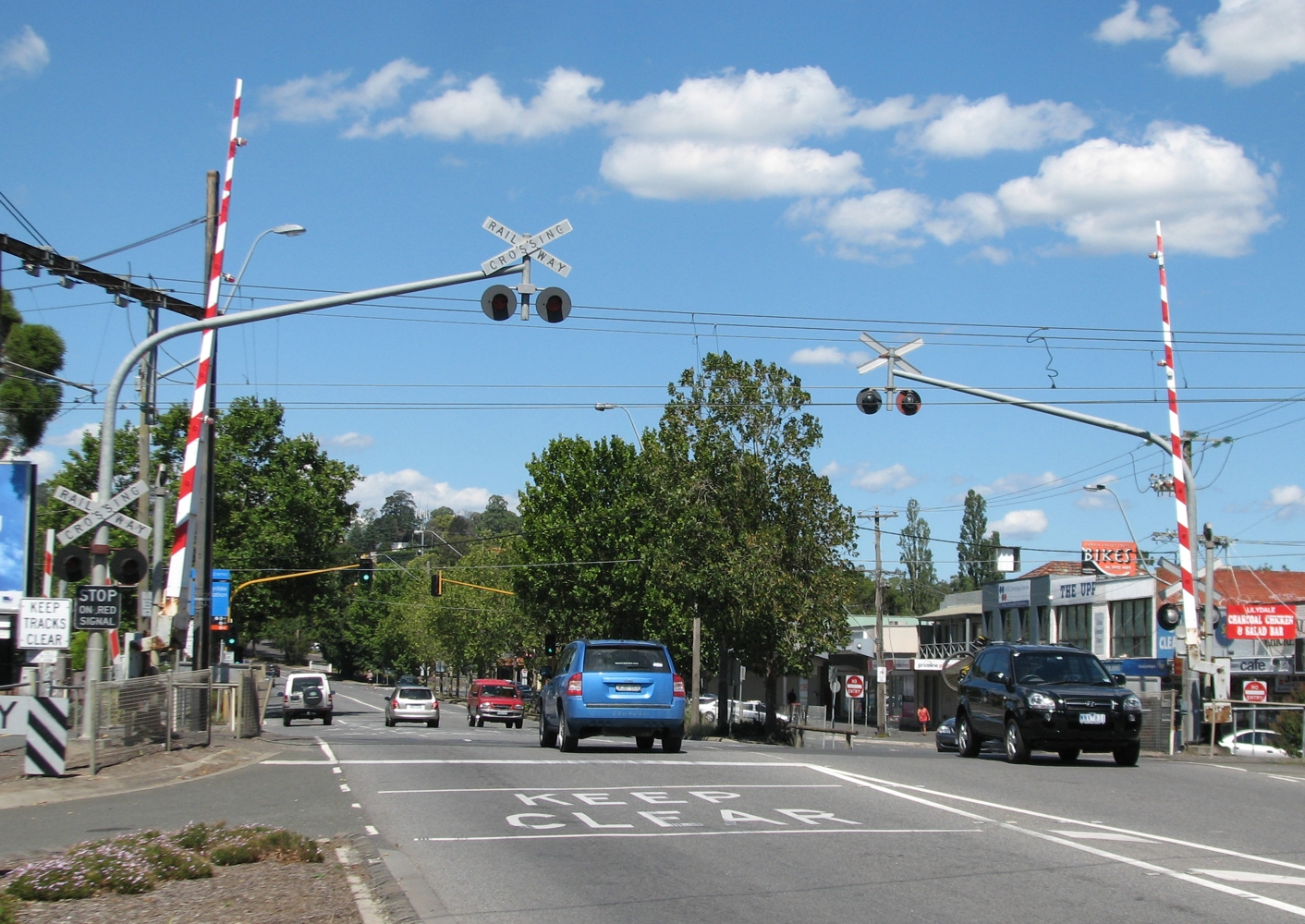
The level crossing at Maroondah Highway, Lilydale, prior to its 2021 removal

A bus station and taxi rank operates from the railway station servicing many of Melbourne's far eastern suburbs.

Lilydale has segregated bicycle facilities including the start of the Lilydale to Warburton Rail Trail which follows the course of the Lilydale-Warburton railway line which was built in 1901 but closed in 1964.

Coldstream Airport is located approximately 5 km north east in Coldstream which has a sealed, all-weather strip to service the area with recreation, charter and fire bombing flying facilities for the local community. Coldstream Airport is home to Yarra Valley Flight Training, Coldstream Flyers Club and ACMA - Australian Centre for Mission Aviation.

Lilydale Airport is located in Yering 5 km north of Lilydale. It is for use by local pilots.

== Education ==
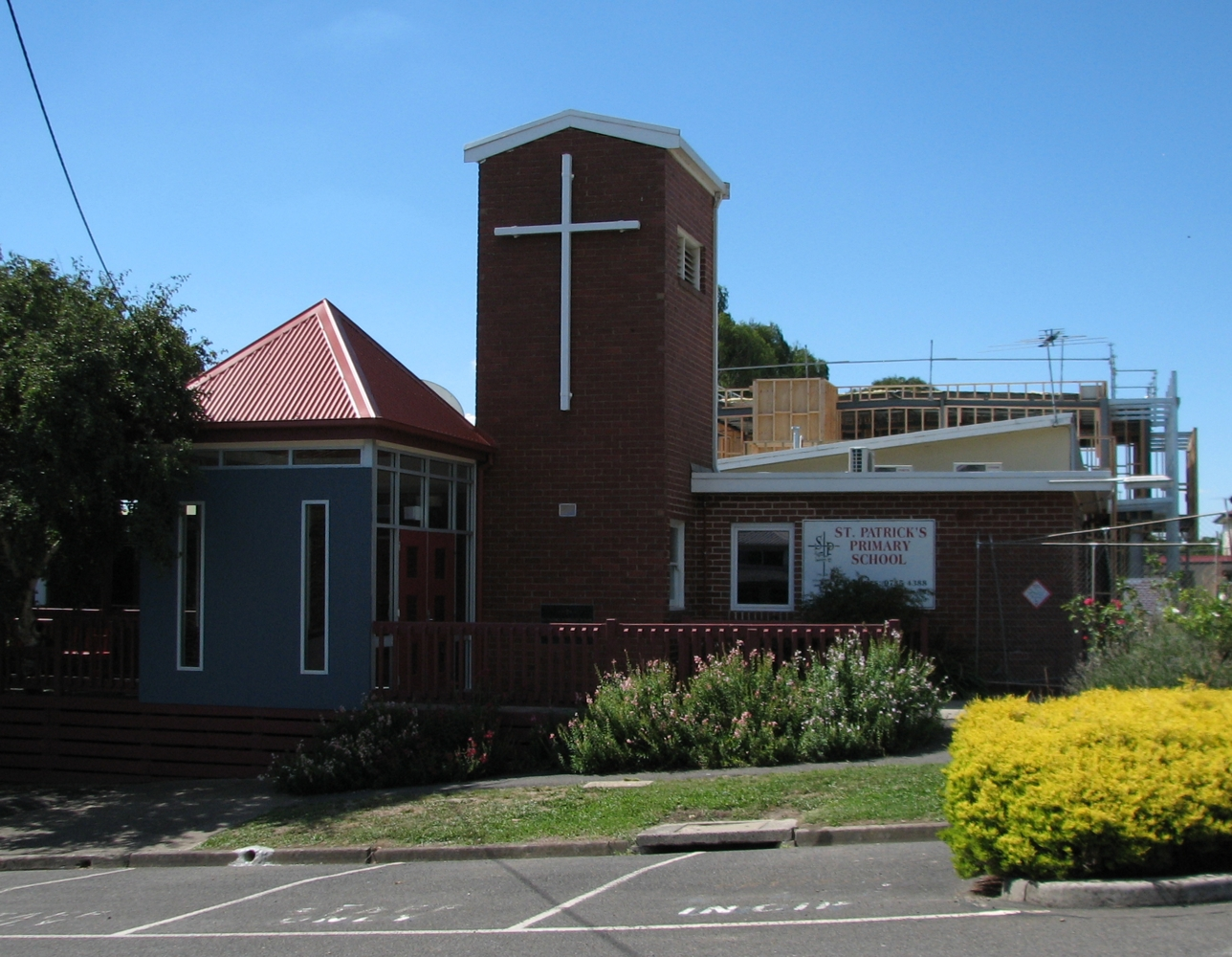
St Patricks Catholic School

There was also a campus of Swinburne University of Technology, which offered TAFE and university courses, since announcing closure other institutes have come forward wanting to run the facilities. Box Hill Institute and the Centre for Adult Education opened their John St Lilydale Community Campus in 2015 offering the people of Lilydale and surrounding districts access to more than 20 quality accredited, short courses and pre-accredited pathway programs.

On 15 February 2016 Box Hill Institute reopened the much larger former Swinburne campus as the Lilydale Lakeside Campus offering vocational training, TAFE and higher education. The Lilydale library, a branch of Eastern Regional Libraries, is also located at the Lakeside Campus. It offers free events for all ages, including children and seniors.

Lilydale has four main secondary schools: Lilydale High School, Mount Lilydale Mercy College, Lilydale Heights College, and Lilydale Adventist Academy. Many primary schools are located in the suburb as well.

Other institutions based in Lilydale include the Yarra Ranges Regional Museum, Australia offices for Institute in Basic Life Principles and Advanced Training Institute.

== Parks and reserves ==
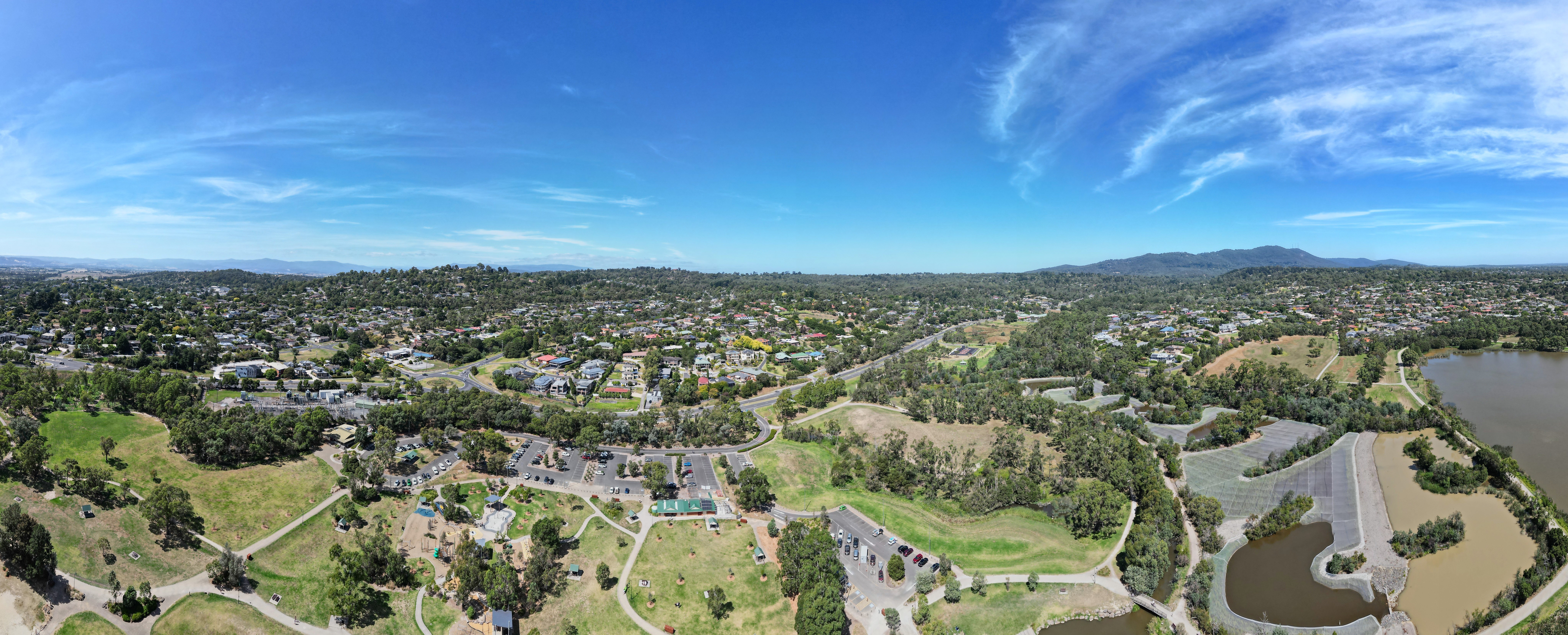
Lillydale Lake's parkland and playgrounds from above

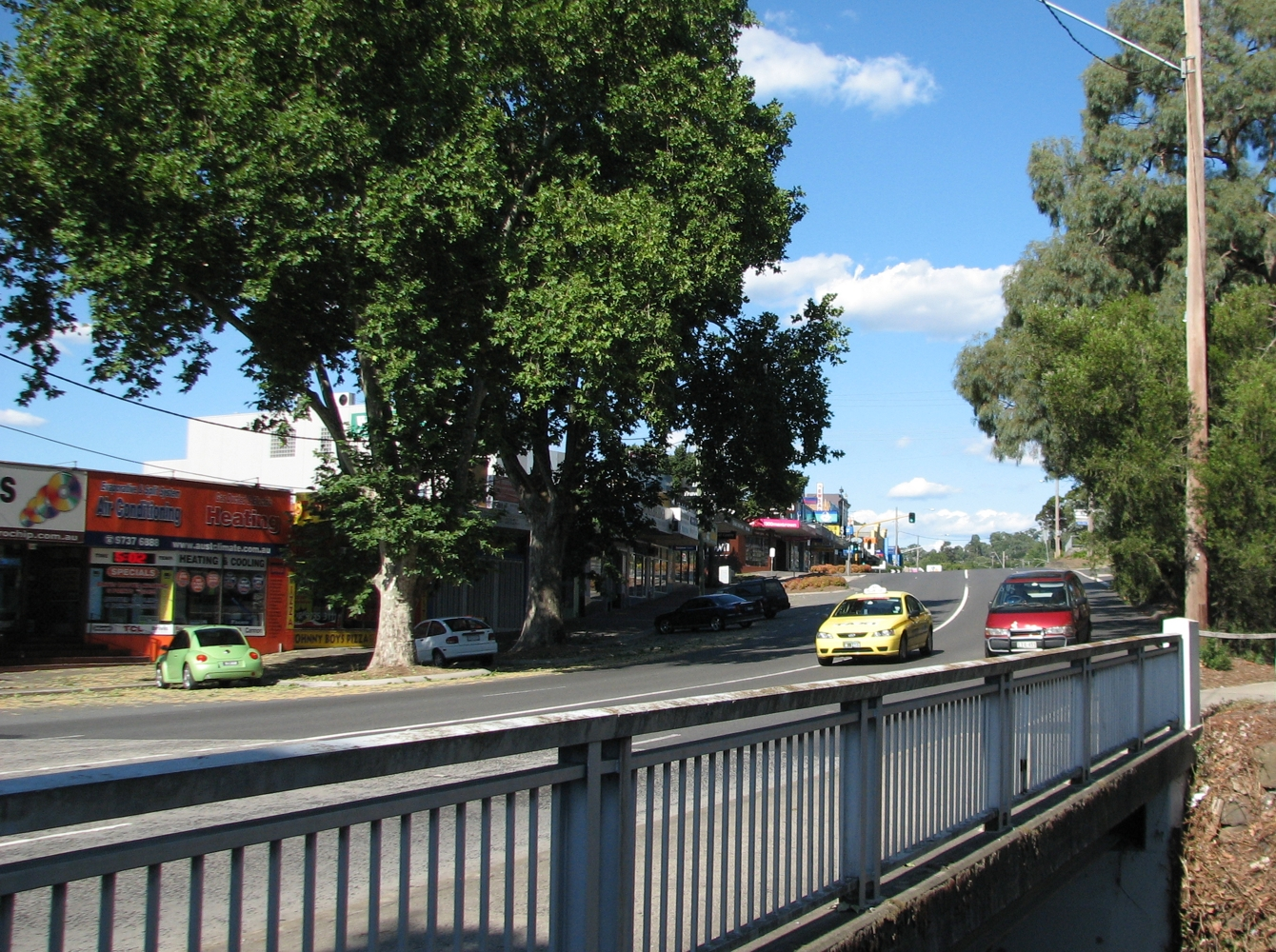
Maroondah Highway bridge crossing Olinda Creek

Olinda Creek runs through Lilydale having its source in the nearby Dandenong Ranges and is a tributary of the Yarra River.

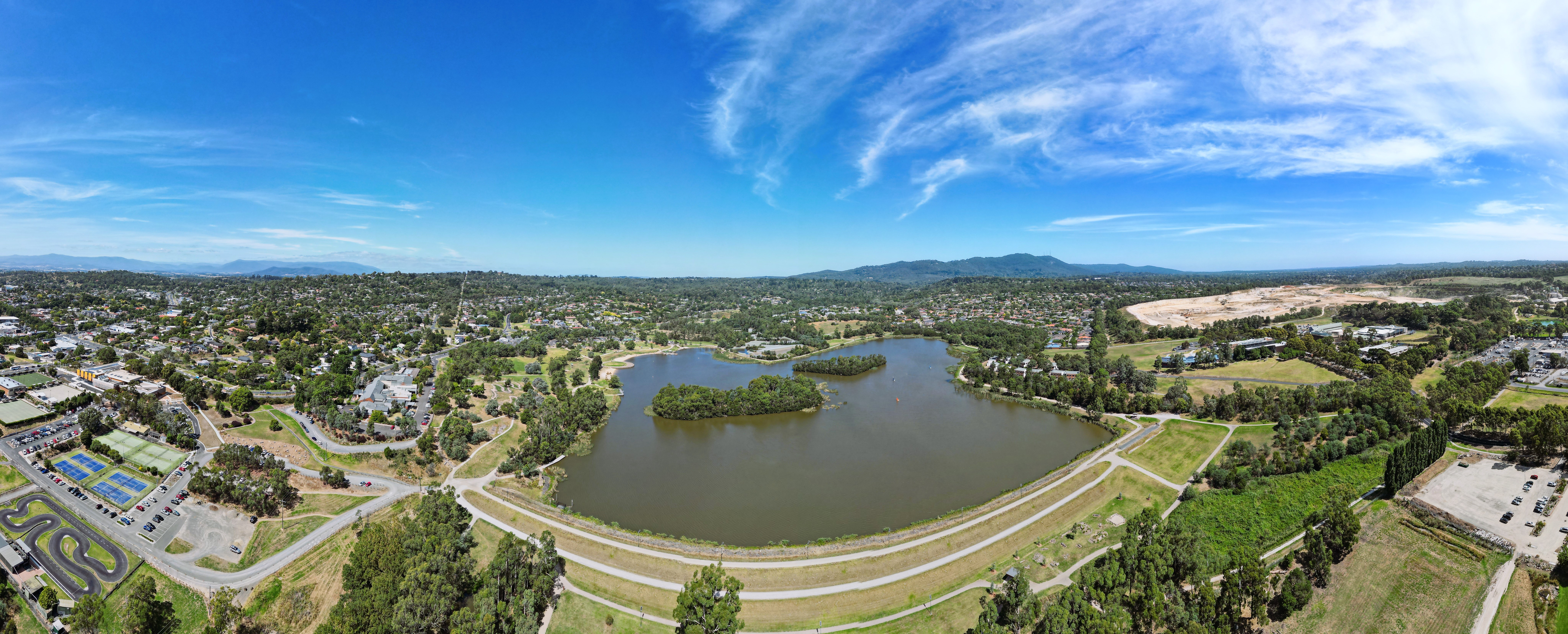
Wide shot of Lillydale Lake, 2023

Lilydale is well known for Lillydale Lake, a recreational area where children play and learn about the wetlands environment. Surrounding the lake are modern housing estates, such as Lakeview Estate.

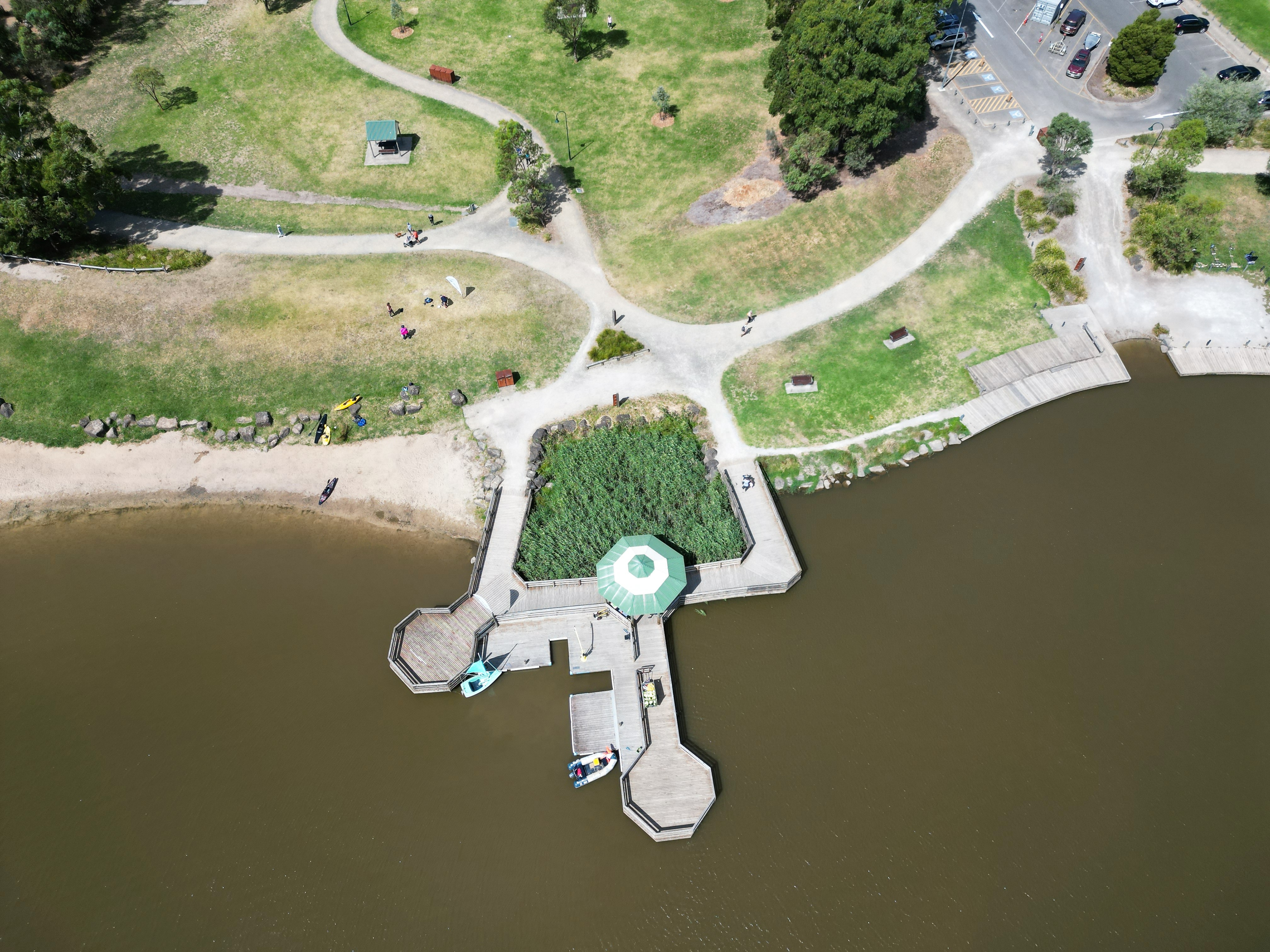
A pier at Lillydale Lake

== Cultural references ==
A popular ground covering product from the long established quarry on the edge of the town, used in pathways, driveways, backyards and composed of crushed limestone of varying grades, is commercially and popularly known as "Lilydale Toppings". That area is now the Kinley estate.

The town is mentioned briefly in the Augie March song The Cold Acre.

In Miss Fisher's Murder Mysteries Series 3 episode Death at the Grand, Phryne arranges to have her troublesome father, Henry, housed there until leaving the country, saying "Even you can't get yourself into trouble in Lilydale."

== Sport ==
The suburb has an Australian Rules football team, The Lilydale Falcons, competing in the Eastern Football League.

Lilydale has a cricket club, the Lilydale Cricket Club, competing in the Ringwood and District Cricket Association.

Lilydale is also home to "Lilydale Skate Centre" in the Industrial area of Lilydale.

== Notable people ==
Notable people from or having lived in Lilydale include:

- Jean Kittson (born 1955), actress
- Dame Nellie Melba (1861–1931), opera singer
- Arthur E. Syme (1863–1943), medical doctor and sportsman
- Elizabeth Catherine Usher AO (1911–1996), pioneering speech therapist
