= Edmund Venables =

British priest, writer, and antiquary

The Reverend Canon Edmund Venables M.A.
- Precentor and Canon-Residentiary of Lincoln Cathedral
- Church: Church of England
- Diocese: Diocese of Lincoln
- Installed: 1867
- Term ended: 1895

Orders
- Ordination: 1844 (deacon) by Ashurst Turner Gilbert, Bishop of Chichester

Personal details
- Born: 5 July 1819 Queenhithe, London, England
- Died: 5 March 1895 (aged 75) Lincoln, England
- Buried: Cloisters, Lincoln Cathedral
- Denomination: Anglican
- Spouse: Caroline Mary Tebbs (m. 1847)
- Children: 1 son, 6 daughters
- Occupation: Clergyman, antiquarian, author
- Education: Pembroke College, Cambridge

Edmund Venables (5 July 1819 – 5 March 1895) was an English cleric and antiquarian.

== Life ==
Born at 17 Queenhithe, London on 5 July 1819, he was third son of William Venables (d. 1840), paper-maker and stationer at 17 Queenhithe, who was Lord Mayor of London in 1826, and M.P. for the City of London 1831–2; his mother, Ann Ruth Fromow, was of Huguenot descent. He was educated at Merchant Taylors' school from July 1830, and in 1838 matriculated at Pembroke College, Cambridge, becoming a scholar (29 May 1839). In 1842 he graduated B.A., as third wrangler. In 1845 he proceeded M.A., and he was admitted ad eundem at Oxford on 17 December 1856. As an undergraduate he was one of the founders of the Cambridge Camden Society.

Venables was ordained deacon by Ashurst Gilbert, the bishop of Chichester in 1844, as curate to Archdeacon Julius Hare, rector of Hurstmonceux in Sussex, and remained there until 1853. In 1846 he was ordained priest by Edward Stanley, the bishop of Norwich. From 1853 to 1855 he was curate at Bonchurch in the Isle of Wight, and for some years after 1855 he remained there, taking pupils.

Venables was appointed by Bishop John Jackson as his examining chaplain at Lincoln, and continued in that position when his diocesan was translated to London in 1869. In 1865 Jackson appointed him to the prebendal stall of Carlton with Thurlby in Lincoln Cathedral, and in 1867 precentor and canon-residentiary of the cathedral.

Venables died at the Precentory, Lincoln, on 5 March 1895.

== Works ==
Venables translated in 1864 Karl Wieseler's Chronological Synopsis of the Four Gospels, which was included in 1877 in Henry Bohn's Theological Library, and he edited in 1869 a translation by his brother G. H. Venables of Friedrich Bleek's Introduction to the Old Testament, reproduced in 1875 in Bohn's Ecclesiastical Library. For the Clarendon Press series he edited in 1879 John Bunyan's Pilgrim's Progress and Grace Abounding; his life of John Bunyan appeared in 1888 in the Great Writers Series; and in 1883 he edited the Private Devotions of Lancelot Andrewes. He contributed an essay on the Architecture of the Cathedrals of England considered Historically to John Saul Howson's Essays on Cathedrals; and he undertook, though he did not live to finish, a volume on the Episcopal Palaces of England (it came out in 1895, the accounts of seven of the palaces being by Venables).

In 1845 Venables became a member of the Royal Archæological Institute, and contributed papers to its journal. While in the Isle of Wight he compiled, with the assistance of local naturalists, a guide to the island, which was published in 1860. In 1867 he brought out, mainly bases on that book, a smaller Guide to the Undercliff of the Isle of Wight. The city of Lincoln inspired papers by Venables, including lectures: A Walk through the Minster, and two series of Walks through the Streets of Lincoln. An essay by him on Lincoln Cathedral was included in 1893 in Our English Minsters, and printed separately in 1898. He edited in 1882 the fourth edition of Murray's Handbook for Wiltshire, Dorsetshire, and Somersetshire, and published in that year a Historical Sketch of Bere Regis, Dorset.

Four addresses on The Church of England delivered in Lincoln Cathedral in September 1886 were published by Venables that year. He was a major contributor to William Smith's Dictionary of the Bible, Dictionary of Christian Antiquities, and Dictionary of Christian Biography; also to the Encyclopædia Britannica, John Kitto's Biblical Encyclopædia, and the Dictionary of National Biography. He was a frequent writer in the Saturday Review, The Athenæum, The Guardian, and Good Words.

== Family ==
Venables married at St Michael's Church, Highgate on 8 September 1847, Caroline Mary, daughter of Henry Tebbs, proctor of Doctors' Commons. She died the day after his own death, and both were buried on 9 March in the same grave in the cloisters of Lincoln Cathedral. They had one son and six daughters.

== Notes ==
Attribution

- This article incorporates text from a publication now in the public domain: Lee, Sidney, ed. (1899). "Venables, Edmund". Dictionary of National Biography. Vol. 58. London: Smith, Elder & Co.
