= Valayanad Devi Temple =

Hindu temple in Kerala, India

- Sree Valayanad Devi Kshetram
- Devi Temple, Valayanad, Kozhikode, Kerala

Religion
- Affiliation: Hinduism
- District: Kozhikode
- Deity: Goddess Parvathy

Location
- Location: Valayanad
- State: Kerala
- Country: India
- Coordinates: 11.243853°N 75.803901°E

Architecture
- Type: Dravidian architecture (Temple)

Specifications
- Temple: One
- Elevation: 45.21 m (148 ft)

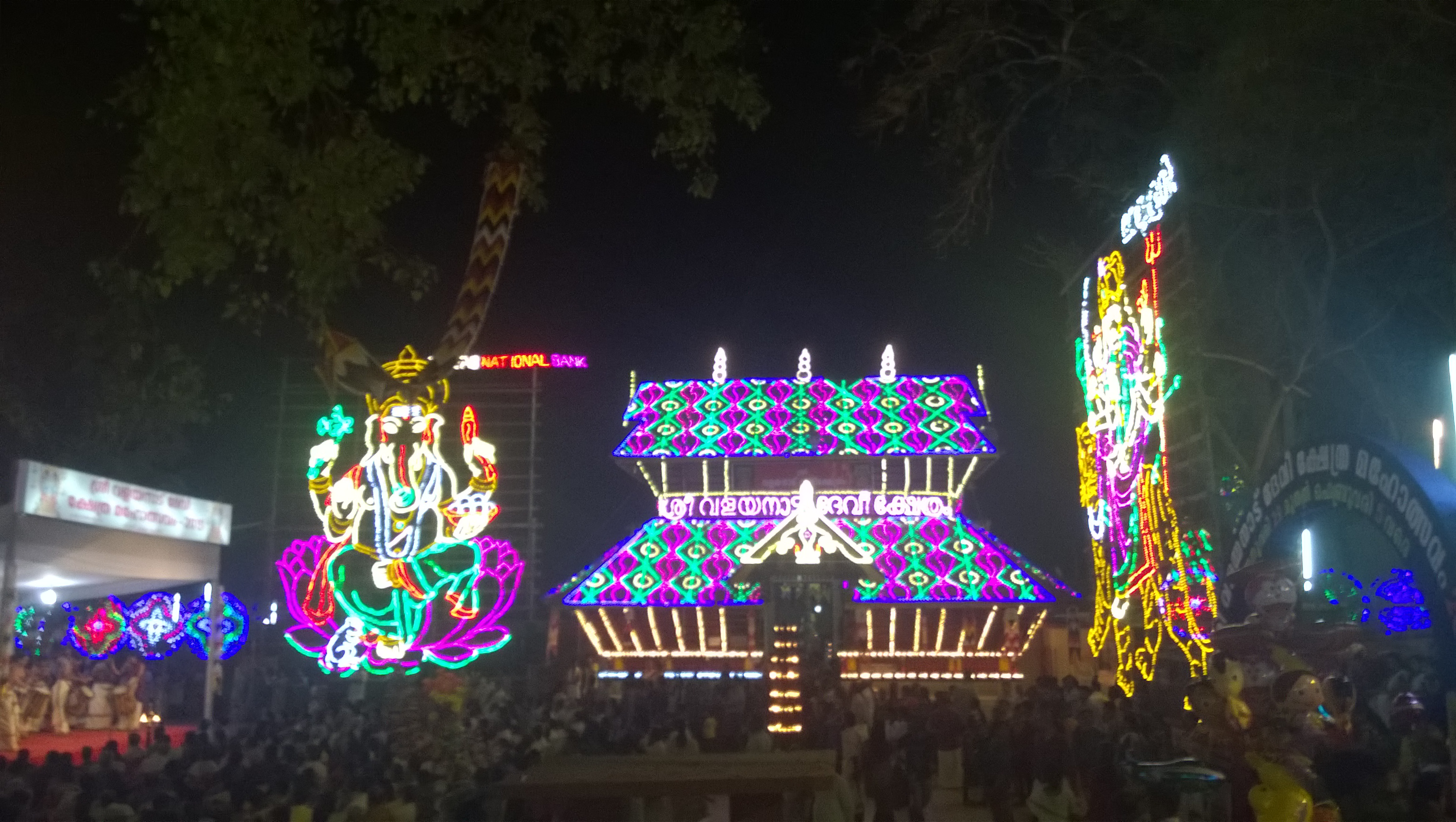
Night view of Valayand Devi temple during an ultsavam (celebrations) in 2015

Sree Valayanad Devi Temple dedicated to Bhagavathy, is situated in Valayanad near Kozhikode in North Kerala, India.

== History ==
Valayanad Bhagavathi is the family deity of the Zamorin Kings (Padinhare Kovilakam), who ruled Kozhikode in the medieval period. Legends say that in a fight between the Zamorin and Valluva Konathiri (the king of Valluvanad), the Zamorin got defeated in spite of having better military and financial might. The Zamorin pondered this, and decided that the Bhagavathy's blessings were with Valluvakonathiri. The Zamorin undertook Tapas in disguise, at Thirumanthamkunnu temple, the family temple of Valluvakonathiri, until Devi manifested before him.

The Zamorin requested Bhagavathy to come to his kingdom. While they were traveling, Devi told Zamorin that whenever he hesitates and turns back to check whether Devi was with him, she will return immediately. After some time, when the jingling of her dance-bells could not be heard, the Zamorin looked back. Immediately Devi told him that she wouldn't come any further, but as a reward for the Zamorin's devotion, she would throw her bangle, and the spot where it fell would have her presence. This bangle rotated for a week and landed at the place where the temple now stands. The place where the bangle rotated for a week came to be known as Azhchavattom and the place where the bangle fell became Thiruvalayanad.

== Description ==
Valayanad Devi temple, dedicated to Bhagavathy, is situated in Valayanad on Mankavu Govindapuram route in the city of Kozhikode. The temple, which faces north, has four gopurams. The Devi temple at Valayanad has its own distinct identity and is different in several respects from other Devi temples in India. It is one of the Saktheya temples where pujas are performed in accordance with practice of Rurujit worship. The presiding deity of this temple is the goddess from Kashmir, known as Chandika, also called Mahartham and Kalasarppini.

The Sreechakra, designed by the great Sivayogi Thayyavur Sivasankar, remains in the sanctum sanctorum, where the presence of the goddess is believed to be ever present. Idols of Shiva, Thevaara Bhagavathi, Lord Ayyappa, and Vigneswara, Khsethrapaalan are also consecrated in this temple. In the sanctum sanctorum on the southern wall idols of Sapthamathrukkal (seven mother Goddesses) are carved. An important ritual conducted in this temple is the Guruthy Tharpanam.

== Festivals and Rites ==
The annual festival commences every year on the day of Karthika of Makaram and continues for seven days. Devi's 'utavall is Kept in Tali Mahadeva Temple. Few days before the 'Uthsavam'(festival) It is taken to Valayanad temple. The 'Arat'(the holy dipping of the idol after the 'Pallivetta') is conducted in Trissaala kulam in Mankavu. During the annual festival There will be not Madhyama (saktheya) Pooja. Brahmins were brought the temple to perform the Uthama Pooja. Kalamezhuthupattu is observed from 1st Vrichikam for 41 days during the Mandala season. Tuesdays and Fridays are considered to be more auspicious for praying in this temple.

== The temple priests ==
The priests of this temple who perform pooja according to Saktheya injunctions in this temple are Pidarar Brahmins. Meat and alcohol is a core feature of worship in this temple, and the priests are by necessity non-vegetarian.

There are five Moosad families residing around the Sri Valayanad Kavu. They have the traditional right to do observances in the temple. The five illams are Vattoli-illam, Vadakke-illam, Kozhiparambillam, Naduvilakandi, and Kozhikodanparambu. The chief poojaris are Vattoli-illam and Vadakke-illam, as an inherited right.

== See also ==
- List of Hindu temples in Kerala
