= Great Writers series =

Collection of literary biographies

The Great Writers series was a collection of literary biographies published in London from 1887, by Walter Scott & Co. The founding editor was Eric Sutherland Robertson, followed by Frank T. Marzials.

The stated intention, articulated by Robertson, was that the series should constitute fact-based textbooks of English literature. He advocated analytical and scholarly methods of literary study. The works generally contained a bibliography, compiled by John Parker Anderson of the British Museum.

A comparable French series also began publication in 1887, edited by Jean Jules Jusserand, under the title Les Grands Écrivains Français. Its inspiration was John Morley's English Men of Letters, published from 1880. Oscar Wilde called the Great Writers series "unfortunate", but suggested that Anderson's bibliographies were of value, and should be collected up. His dislike of the restrictions on authors extended also to the English Men of Letters. Other series in imitation of English Men of Letters were English Worthies (Longman) and Literary Lives (Hodder).

Year	Subject	Author	Comment
1887	Henry Wadsworth Longfellow	Eric Sutherland Robertson
1887	Samuel Taylor Coleridge	Hall Caine	"a sound and, within its scope, comprehensive volume"
1887	Charles Dickens	Frank T. Marzials
1887	Dante Gabriel Rossetti	Joseph Knight
1887	Samuel Johnson	Francis Richard Charles Grant
1887	Charles Darwin	George Thomas Bettany
1887	Charlotte Brontë	Augustine Birrell
1887	Thomas Carlyle	Richard Garnett
1887	Tobias George Smollett	David Hannay
1887	Adam Smith	Richard Haldane
1887	John Keats	William Michael Rossetti
1887	Percy Bysshe Shelley	William Sharp
1888	Oliver Goldsmith	Austin Dobson
1888	Walter Scott	Charles Duke Yonge
1888	Robert Burns	John Stuart Blackie
1888	Victor Hugo	Frank T. Marzials
1888	Ralph Waldo Emerson	Richard Garnett
1888	Johann Wolfgang von Goethe	James Sime
1888	William Congreve	Edmund Gosse
1888	John Bunyan	Edmund Venables
1888	George Crabbe	Thomas Edward Kebbel	"Cheap, short and unsympathetic"
1888	Heinrich Heine	William Sharp
1889	John Stuart Mill	W. L. Courtney	"although not negligible, is of very minor importance"
1889	Friedrich Schiller	Henry Woodd Nevinson
1889	Frederick Marryat	David Hannay
1889	Honoré de Balzac	Frederick Wedmore
1889	Gotthold Ephraim Lessing	T. W. Rolleston
1890	John Milton	Richard Garnett
1890	George Eliot	Oscar Browning	Largely criticism
1890	Jane Austen (1890)	Goldwyn Smith	"signifies the recognition of Austen as a standard classic author"
1890	Robert Browning	William Sharp
1890	Lord Byron	Roden Noel
1890	Nathaniel Hawthorne	Moncure Conway
1890	Arthur Schopenhauer	William Wallace
1890	Richard Brinsley Sheridan	Lloyd C. Sanders
1890	Henry Thoreau	Henry Shakespear Stephens Salt	revised edition 1896
1891	William Makepeace Thackeray	Herman Charles Merivale and Frank Marzials
1891	Miguel de Cervantes	Henry Edward Watts
1892	Voltaire	Francis Espinasse
1893	James Leigh Hunt	Cosmo Monkhouse	"most careful, but not entirely sympathetic"
1893	John Greenleaf Whittier	William James Linton
1895	Ernest Renan	Francis Espinasse

Two further lives from the same publisher, of John Ruskin (1910) by Ashmore Wingate, and of Maurice Maeterlinck (1913) by Jethro Bithell, do not conform to the pattern of the series.
