= Advanced Training Institute =

Technical institute in Kerala, India

Advanced Training Institute Calicut
- Type: Technical Institute
- Established: 1981
- Director: Madhu Nair
- Location: Kozhikode, Kerala, India
- Campus: 15 acres (0.061 km^{2}),
- Website: www.aticalicut.org

National Skill Training Institute (Erstwhile ATI) in Calicut, Kerala, India, is a technical institute under the Directorate General of Training, Ministry of Skill Development and Entrepreneurship of the Government of India. It aims to develop skilled manpower for industry, instructional staff for the Industrial Training Institutes, and to upgrade the skill of in-service persons from industry.

It is funded by the Government of India. The campus is situated near Govindapuram, a suburb of Kozhikode.

The institute was established in 1981 as Model ITI (MITI), near Beypore, Calicut, with courses in Craftsmen Training in Restructured Pattern, with four trades. Later in 1997 it was shifted to a new building at Eravathukunnu, Govindapuram. At that time new trades were introduced and new hostel blocks also constructed.

In 2014 MITI was upgraded to an advanced training institute.

Long term courses offered by ATI include Craft Instructor Training Scheme (CITS) in the trades of mechanic, refrigeration and air conditioning, electrician, and electronic mechanic. In addition, ATI offers short term courses granting HVAC, CAD (Autocad & Catia), automation, automobile and electrical training. In Bhubaneswar NSTI is situated.
