= Chalappuram =

Chalappuram, Kozhikode
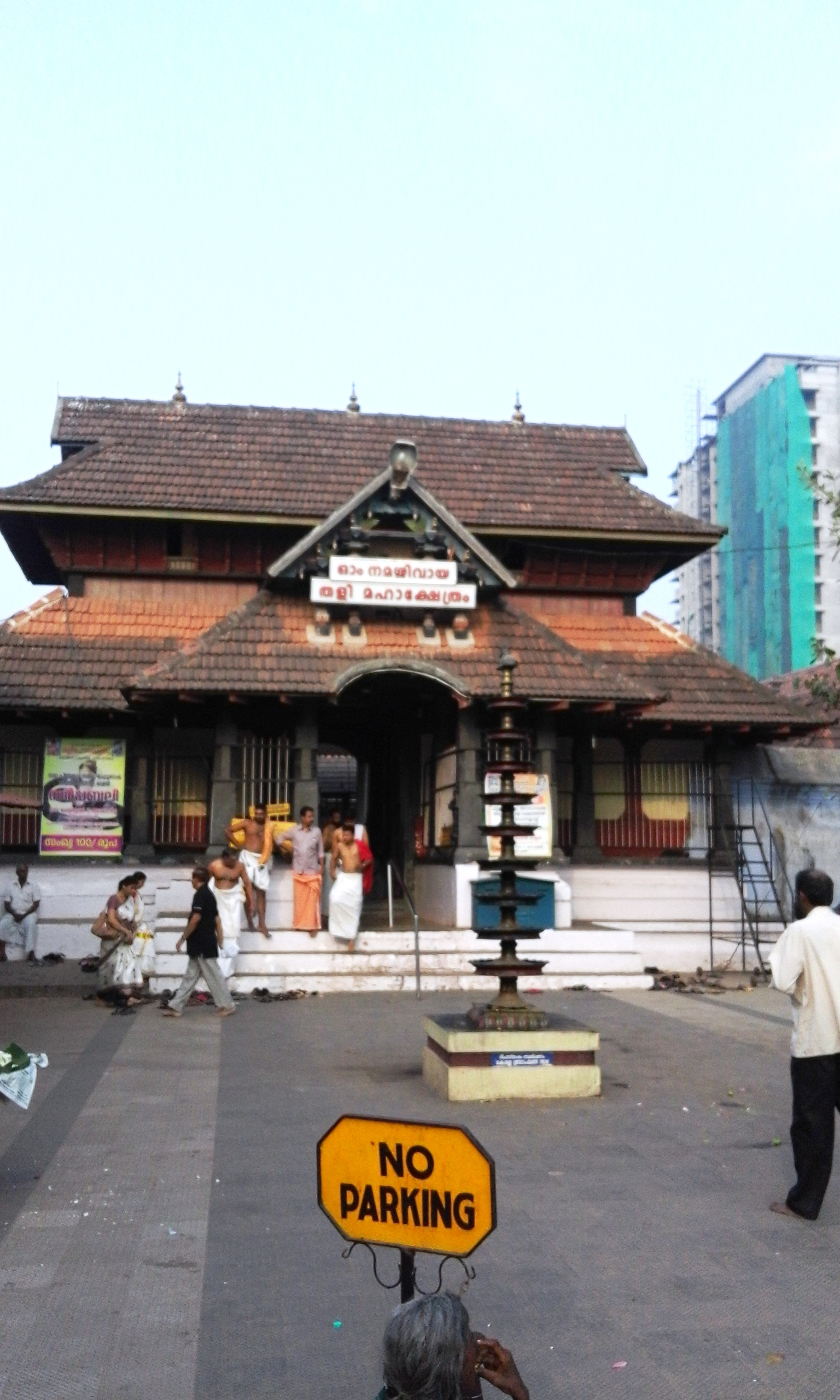
- Thali Shiva Temple
- Interactive map of Chalappuram, Kozhikode
- Coordinates: 11.24281°N 75.78609°E
- Country: India
- State: Kerala

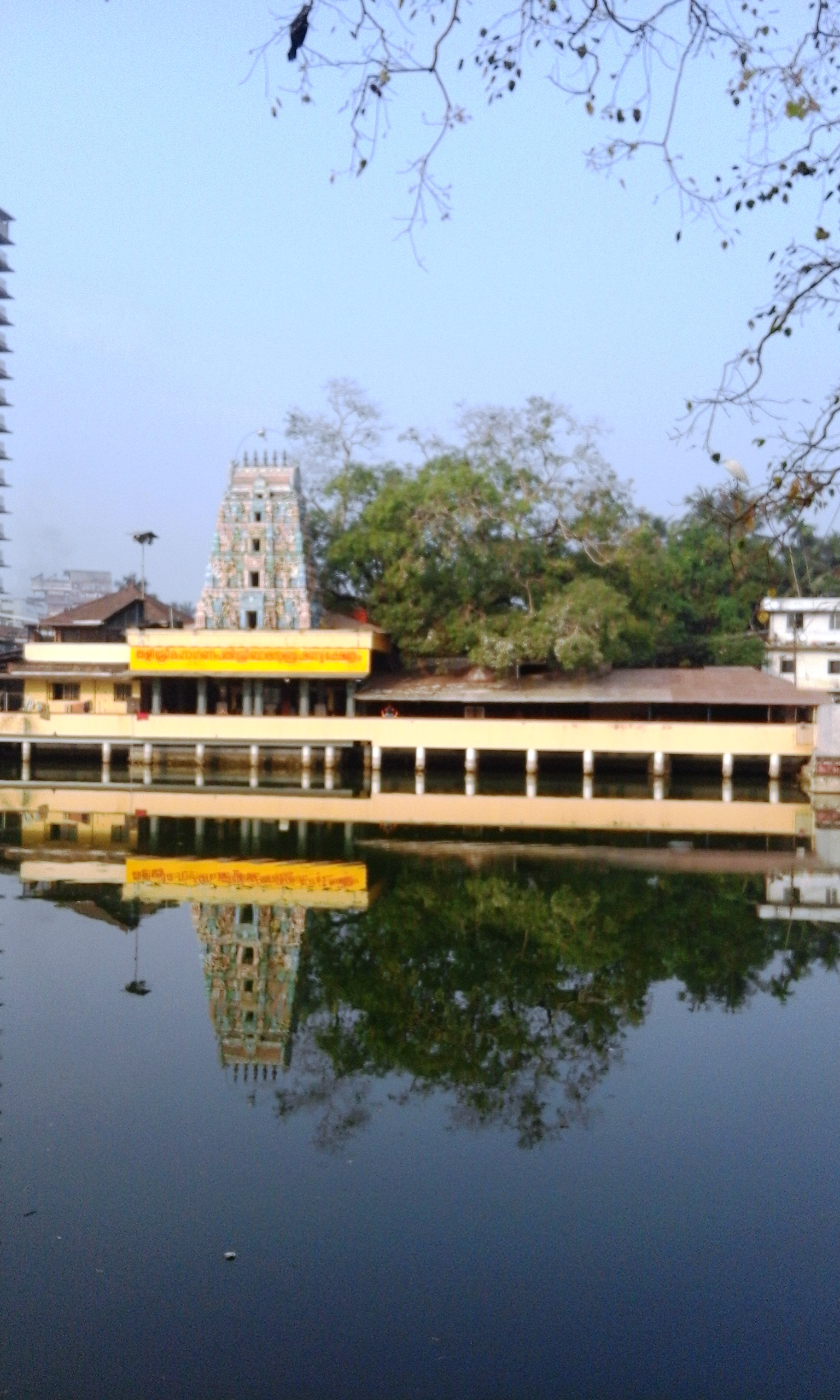
Subramanya Temple, Chalappuram

Chalappuram is part of Kozhikode city in India.

== Location ==
Chalappuram is an old residential area of the city. The major thoroughfare Mankavu- Pushpa junction road got a face-lift in recent years and attracting commercial establishments now. Chalapuram is strategically located, with railway station and bus stands at walking distances. Chalappuram Post Office is located at the junction where P.V.Samy Road meets the Mankavu Pushpa road.

The road going west of Pushpa junction is called Francis Road which connects Chalappuram with the Kuttichira and Kozhikode beaches. Annie Hall Road connects Chalappuram to the railway station.

Samooham Road connects to Tali temple and Palayam areas. There is a Link Road between Palayam and the railway station which is travelers corner in the city. This road came into existence because of the courageous and painstaking efforts taken by the former District Collector of Kozhikode Shri. Amitabh Kanth.

== Palayam Junction ==
Palayam junction has a vegetable market and a minor bus station. This junction is directly connected to Mananchira Pond by the Muthalakkulam route. Ahmediya Mosque and Touring Book Stall are situated in this area. Moulana Mohammed Ali Road connects Palayam to Mavoor Road.

== See also ==
- Kallayi
- Beypore
- Nallalam

== Important landmarks ==
- Tali Shiva Temple
- Mahaganapathi Balasubramanya Temple
- Kokkozhikode Siva Temple, Mooriyad Road
- Govt.Ganapath High School for Boys
- National Child Development Council
- Pushpa Junction
- Chalappuram sree krishna temple, Mooriyad Road
