= William Cosmo Monkhouse =

British poet and critic (1840–1901)

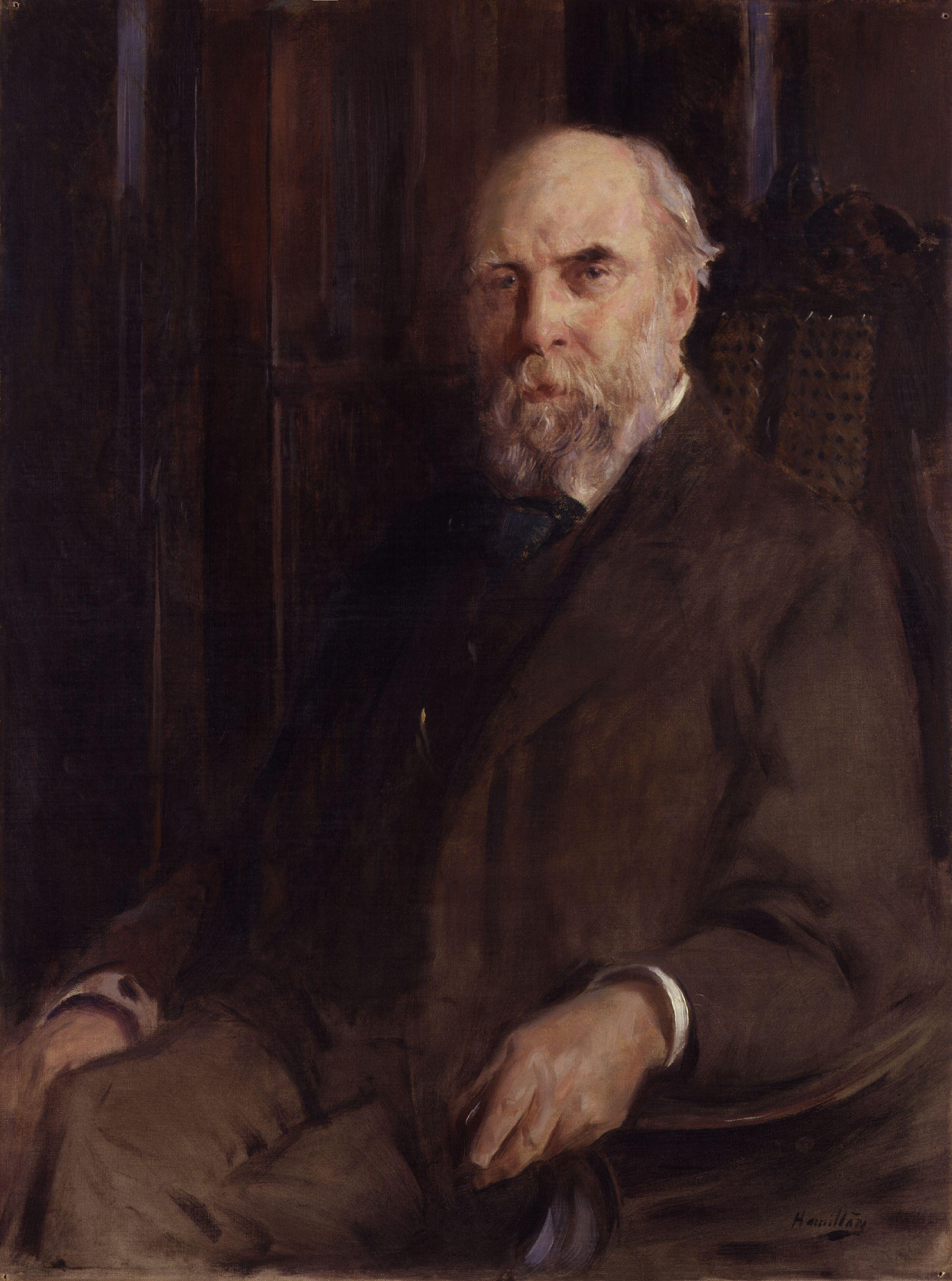
- Monkhouse by John McLure Hamilton
- Born: 18 March 1840; London, England
- Died: 20 July 1901 (aged 61)
- Occupations: Poet and art critic
- Spouses: Laura Keymer; Leonora Eliza Blount

William Cosmo Monkhouse (18 March 1840 – 20 July 1901) was a British poet and critic.

== Biography ==
Monkhouse was born and raised in London. His father, Cyril John Monkhouse, was a solicitor, and his mother's maiden name was Delafosse. Monkhouse was educated at St Paul's School, but stopped his schooling at the age of seventeen to enter the board of trade as a junior supplementary clerk, from which grade he rose eventually to be the assistant-secretary to the finance department of the office. In 1870–1871 he visited South America in connection with the hospital accommodation for seamen at Valparaíso, Chile, and other ports; he served on different departmental committees, notably that of 1894–1896 on the Mercantile Marine Fund. Monkhouse was twice married: first, to Laura, daughter of James Keymer of Dartford; and, secondly, to Leonora Eliza, daughter of Commander Blount, R.N.

Cosmo Monkhouse was one of those who not only have a vocation, but an avocation. Cosmo's first bias was to poetry, and in 1865 he issued A Dream of Idleness and Other Poems, a collection strongly coloured by his admiration for Wordsworth and Tennyson. It was marked by exceptional maturity and scarcely received the recognition it deserved. Perhaps owing to this circumstance, it was not until 1890 that he put forth Corn and Poppies, a collection containing at least one memorable effort in the well-known "Dead March". Five years later, a limited edition of the striking ballad of The Christ upon the Hill appeared; it was illustrated with etchings by William Strang. After Cosmo's death, his poetical output was completed by Pasiteles the Elder and other Poems (including The Christ upon the Hill).

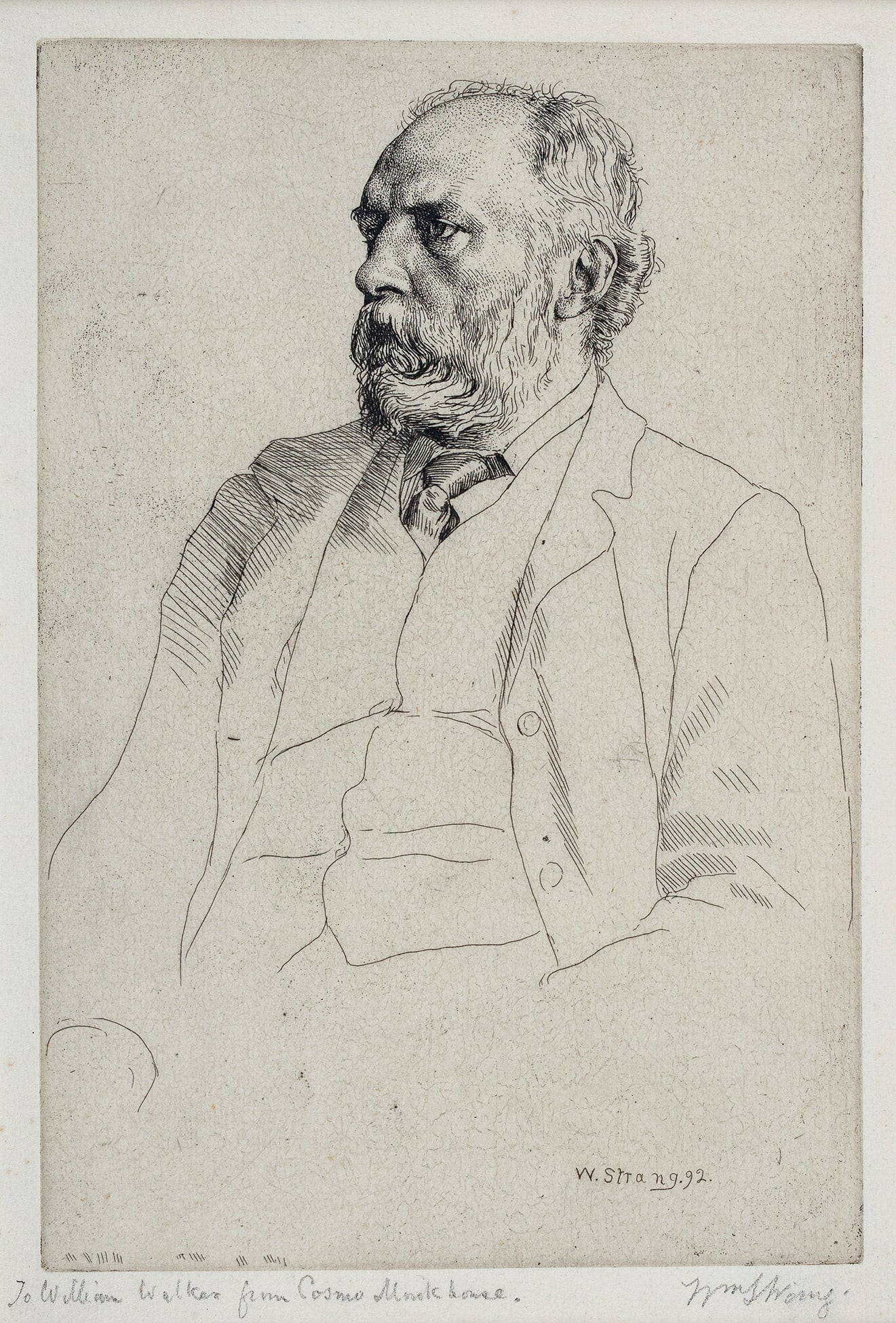
Cosmo Monkhouse (1892) by William Strang, signed by both the artist and sitter, with a dedication by the latter

In 1868 Monkhouse wrote a novel A Question of Honour. Then, after preluding with a Life of Turner in the "Great Artists Series" (1879), he devoted himself almost exclusively to art criticism. Besides many contributions to the Academy, Saturday Review, Magazine of Art and other periodicals, he published volumes on The Italian Pre-Raphaelites (1887), The Earlier English Water-Colour Painters (1890 and 1897), In the National Gallery (1895) and British Contemporary Artists (1899). He wrote a monograph on the illustrator of Alice's Adventures in Wonderland entitled The Life and Work of Sir John Tenniel, R. I. (London: 1901). He was a contributor to the Dictionary of National Biography from the beginning. Monkhouse also wrote a life of Leigh Hunt in the "Great Writers Series" (1887). He wrote a monograph on Chinese ceramics entitled A history and description of Chinese Porcelain, (London; Chapman, 1901).

According to the Encyclopædia Britannica Eleventh Edition: "As an art critic, Monkhouse's judgments were highly valued. He had the rare gift of differing without offending, while he invariably secured respect for his honesty and ability. As a poet, his ambition was wide and his devotion to the art ... thorough."

Monkhouse died at Skegness on 2 July 1901.

== Family ==
He was twice married: first in 1865 to Laura, daughter of James Keymer of Dartford in Kent; second in 1873 to Leonora Eliza, the daughter of Commander Blount, R.N., by whom he had two sons and six daughters.
