= Eric Sutherland Robertson =

Scottish academic (1857–1926)

Eric Sutherland Robertson (1857 – 24 May 1926) was a Scottish man of letters, academic in India, and clergyman.

== Life ==
Robertson graduated at Edinburgh University in 1873 and then moved to London where he became a journalist. Between 1880 and 1881 Robertson edited the Magazine of Art. In 1882 he shared rooms at 18 Clement's Inn with his journalist friend Hall Caine, where they often hosted intellectual gatherings. They frequently had their evening meals delivered from nearby Clare Market, which were brought by two young women. Months later their father's confronted Robertson and Caine demanding marriage, claiming the young women had been ‘ruined’. According to Caine's biographer, nothing more than 'a bit of flirting' had taken place. Robertson moved to Redhill, Chislehurst and wrote English Poetesses, published by Cassell in September 1883.

In 1884 Robertson acted as best man for his friend William Sharp. He set up the Great Writers series, published from 1887. At the same period he was appointed to Lahore Government College of the University of the Punjab, where he was Professor of English Literature and Philosophy.

From 1896 Robertson was vicar of Bowness-on-Windermere.

== Works ==
- English Poetesses: A Series of Critical Biographies (1883)
- Life of Henry Wadsworth Longfellow (1887)
- The Dreams of Christ, and Other Verses (1891)
- Wordsworth and the English Lake Country: An Introduction to a Poet's Country (1911)
- The Bible's Prose Epic of Eve and her Sons: the 'J' Stories in Genesis
- Wordsworthshire
- From Alleys and Valleys
- The Human Bible: A Study in the Divine (1920)
