= Lilydale Heights College =

Location
- Lilydale, Victoria; Australia; 37°44′41.62″S 145°20′28.79″E

Information
- Type: government co-educational secondary school
- Motto: Excellence Respect Responsibility
- Established: 1970
- Educational authority: Victorian Department of Education
- Principal: Shane Kruger
- Teaching staff: 58.9 (on an FTE basis)
- Years: 7–12
- Enrolment: 754 (2022)
- Campus: Suburban
- Colours: Navy blue, white and gold
- Newspaper: The Heights (monthly newsletter)
- Website: www.lilydaleheights.vic.edu.au

Lilydale Heights College is a government secondary school located in the suburb of Lilydale, east of Melbourne, Victoria, Australia. It covers both junior secondary and higher secondary (VCE) curricula, and draws students from primary schools from the urban areas of Lilydale and the rural Yarra Valley.

== History ==
The school began in 1970 as Lilydale Technical School and changed its name to Lilydale Heights Secondary College in 1989, finally becoming Lilydale Heights College in 2004.

The first building has been demolished; however, it consisted of many portables. During the period of the 1970s, the current building blocks replaced the portables. The portables have since been demolished, there is only concrete where the portables were stands today. Many renovations have been conducted since 2020 to accompany the increasing amount of arriving students. These include a second gym, also acting as the bus stop.
