= Pidarar =

Pidarar (originally Bhaṭṭāraka, meaning "learned / venerable") is a caste of northern Kerala, India. Traditionally they perform the duty as priests in Kali temples, which involves animal.sacrifice. They belong to the Vishwamitra gotra, and follow Kaula sampradaya.
