= James Sime =

Scottish biologist, literary critic, and historian (1843–1895)

- Born: 1843; Airdrie
- Died: 1895 (aged 51–52); Bedford Park, London
- Occupations: Journalist, historian
- Spouse: Jane Anderson
- Relatives: Jessie Sime, daughter
- Writing career
- Period: 19th century
- Genre: History

James Sime FRSE (1843–1895) was a Scottish biologist, literary critic, and historian.

== Life ==
Born to James Sime of Airdrie, and then of Wick, Caithness and Thurso, and his wife Jane Anderson of Glasgow (died 1889). He was educated at Anderson's Gymnasium, Aberdeen, leaving in 1859 for Edinburgh University, where he graduated M.A. in 1867. In 1866, rather than entering the ministry, he went to Germany, and studied German literature and philosophy, first at Heidelberg University, and then at Berlin University.

Sime returned to Britain and settled in London's Norland Square in the Notting Hill district in 1869, and went into journalism. In 1870 he went to Edinburgh and was elected a Fellow of the Royal Society of Edinburgh his proposer being Philip Kelland.

In 1871 he took a mastership at Edinburgh Academy, but resigned in 1873 and returned to London. He was a writer for the rest of his life, in areas including social and educational topics, and European politics. As a journalist he worked on The Globe, the Pall Mall Gazette, and the St. James's Gazette under Frederick Greenwood. He contributed to The Athenæum, Saturday Review, and the English Illustrated Magazine. He wrote long-term for The Graphic and Daily Graphic, and for some time was on the staff of Nature magazine.

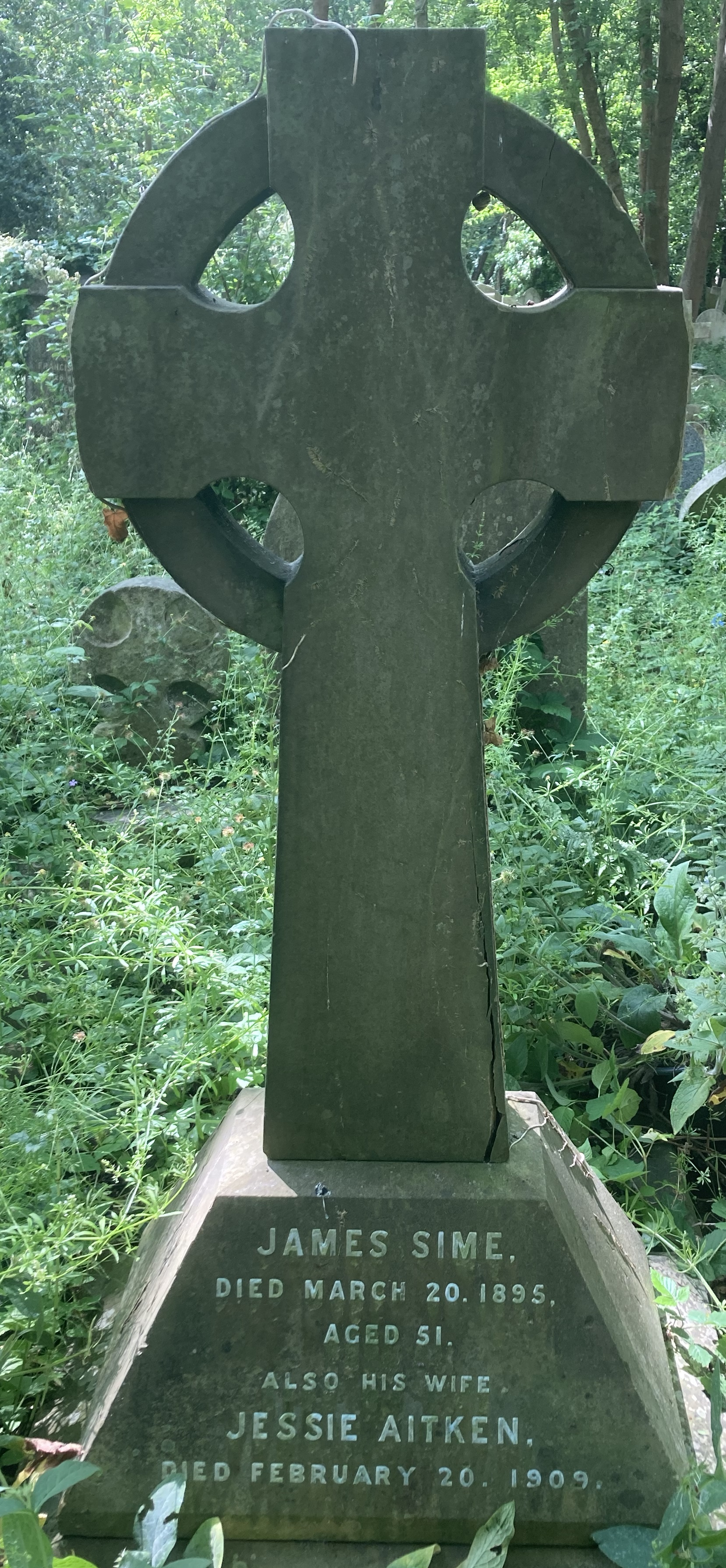
Grave of James Sime in Highgate Cemetery

From 1880 Sime lived in Bedford Park, London, at 1 Queen Anne's Grove, in a house which he had commissioned. He died there of influenza, on 20 March 1895, and was buried on the eastern side of Highgate Cemetery.

== Works ==
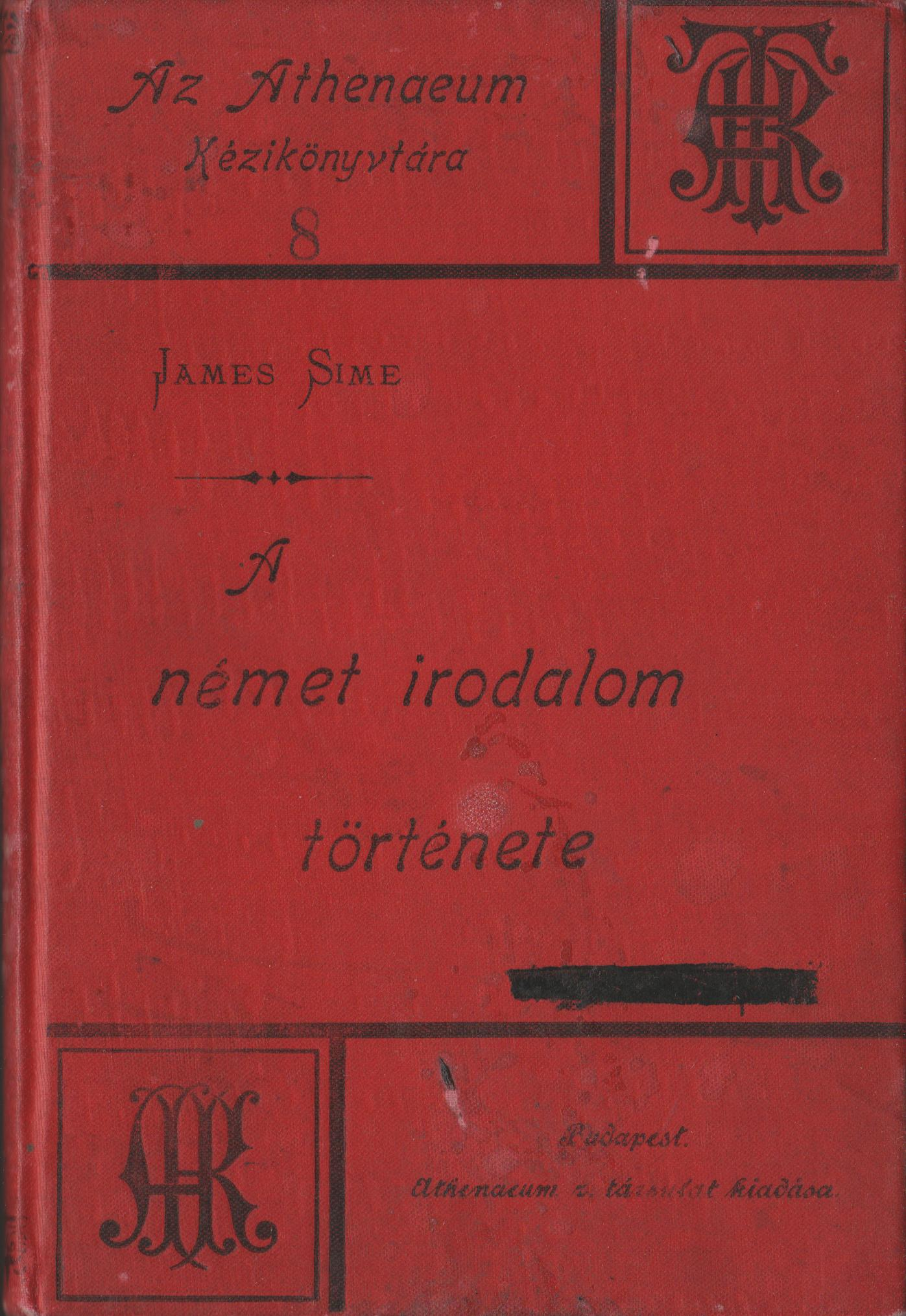
History of the German literature (Hungarian edition)

Sime's published works were:

- History of Germany (1874)
- Life of Lessing 2 vols. 1877. During his period in Germany Sime had collected biographical material for this work, and on Goethe and Schiller.
- Schiller (Blackwood's Foreign Classics for English Readers), 1882.
- Mendelssohn's Letters, 1887.
- Life of Goethe (Great Writers Series), 1888.
- Geography of Europe, 1890.
- Lessing (English and Foreign Philosophical Library), Kegan Paul, Trench, Trübner & Co., 1896.
- William Herschel And His Work, 1900.

He also edited Lessing's Minna von Barnhelm, 1877, and wrote articles dealing with German history, literature, and biography (including Frederick II and Gotthold Ephraim Lessing) in the Encyclopædia Britannica, 9th edition.

== Family ==
Sime married, on 6 October 1865, Jessie Aitken Wilson, youngest sister of Sir Daniel Wilson, who was professor of History and English Literature at the University of Toronto, and of George Wilson of Edinburgh University. His daughter, Jessie Sime was a novelist who emigrated to Montreal, Canada and wrote several Canadian themed books.
