= Jessie Sime =

Canadian writer

- Born: February 12, 1868; Hamilton, Lanarkshire, Scotland
- Died: September 13, 1958 (aged 90); Wootton Wawen, Warwickshire, England
- Occupation: Writer (novelist)
- Relatives: James Sime, father
- Writing career
- Period: 20th century
- Genre: Fiction

Jessie Georgina Sime (February 12, 1868 – September 13, 1958) was a Scottish born Canadian novelist.

== Biography ==
Sime was born in Hamilton, South Lanarkshire in Scotland in 1868. Her parents were James Sime and Jessie Wilson. Her mother worked as a teacher and her father was a journalist and historian who wrote several books on German history. She was home schooled and also attended Queen's College in London. She spent a year in Berlin studying voice. She returned to England, where she worked as a journalist in London and Edinburgh. While in Edinburgh she began a relationship with a Canadian doctor, Walter William Chipman. In 1907 she decided to visit Canada and ended up staying in Montreal for the remainder of her life. She wrote most of her novels while in Canada and many of them were themed after her adopted country.

== Works ==
- The Mistress Of All Work, (1916)
- Canada Chaps, (1917)
- Sister Woman, (1919)
- Our Little Life: A Novel Of To-day, (1921)
- Thomas Hardy Of The Wessex Novels, (1928)
- In A Canadian Shack, (1937)
- The Land Of Dreams, (1940)
- Orpheus In Quebec, (1942)
- Dreams Of The World Of Light, (1951)
- Brave Spirits, (1952) [with Frank Nicholson]
- A Tale Of Two Worlds, (1953) [with Frank Nicholson]
- Inez And Her Angel, (1954) [with Frank Nicholson]
