= William Smith Syme =

Dr William Smith Syme FRSE (1870–1928) was a Newfoundland-born surgeon who came to fame in Scotland.

== Life ==
He was born in Newfoundland in 1870 (then a colony of Britain). He was sent to Edinburgh in Scotland in 1887 to study Medicine and graduated MB ChB in 1891. After graduation he worked briefly in Crewe then moved to Gamlingay in Cambridgeshire. He received his doctorate (MD) in 1898.

In 1903 he moved to Glasgow, living at 3 Northbank Terrace in the Kelvinside district. Here he was a surgeon at Glasgow's Ear Nose and Throat Hospital, also consulting to the Royal Hospital for Sick Children. In Glasgow he associated with several influential physicians, including Thomas Kennedy Dalziel. Soon after arrival he co-founded the Scottish Otological and Laryngological Society.

He was President of the Ruskin Society of Glasgow.

In 1912 he was elected a Fellow of the Royal Society of Edinburgh. His proposers were Thomas Hastie Bryce, Arthur Logan Turner, Ralph Stockman and Robert Jardine.

In 1922 he was living at 1 Lynedoch Crescent in north-west Glasgow.

He died on 14 August 1928 whilst on holiday in Abersoch in North Wales.

== Family ==
Syme and his wife had six children. His son William Smith Syme Jr followed in his father's footsteps. They worked together in hospital and private clinical practice. They are often confused. William Jr won the Military Cross in the First World War.

== Publications ==
- Handbook of Diseases of Nose Throat and Ear (1920)
