= Arthur E. Syme =

Australian surgeon and sportsman

Dr Arthur Edward Syme (c. 1863 – 27 January 1943) was a medical doctor, surgeon and sportsman in the Australian state of Victoria.

== History ==
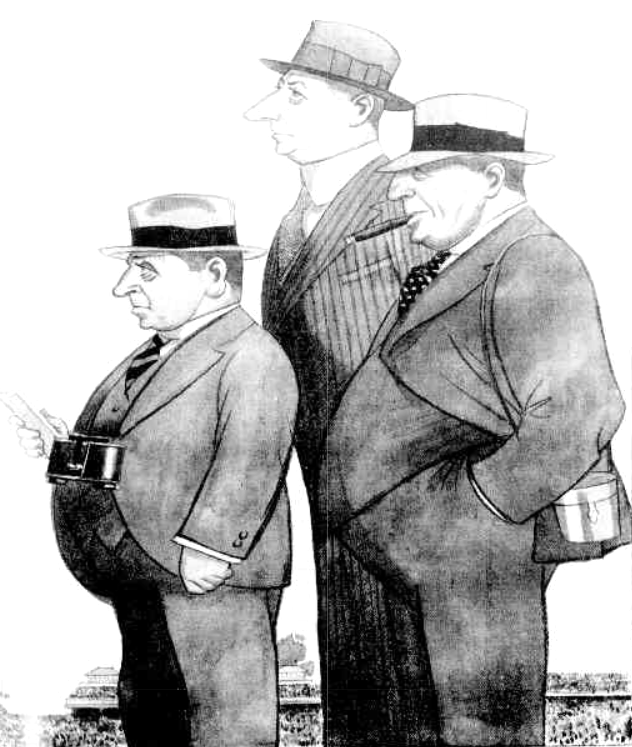
Syme, Baillieu and Chaffey of VATC — caricature by Reynolds

Syme was the third son of David Syme, owner of The Age and The Leader, and his wife Annabella Syme, née Johnson (1837–1915). He was educated at Melbourne Grammar School and the University of Melbourne and Edinburgh University. In 1895 he set up in medical practice at Lilydale, Victoria, (Note: The Age obituary uses the town's earlier spelling, "Lillydale".) where he remained, visiting patients by horse and buggy in the Dandenong district as far as Warburton.

As a young man he played Australian rules football with Essendon. He joined the Victorian Mounted Rifles, and was a crack shot, reaching the rank of major. He played tennis and cricket, but was best known in the equestrian sports of hunting and racing. He was longtime committee member of the Victoria Amateur Turf Club and Williamstown Racing Club. He raced a number of good horses, at first under his own name then from around 1914 as "Mr S. A. Rawdon": Nigel won the Australian Steeplechase in 1908; Blague won the Caulfield Guineas, Newmarket and Goodwood handicaps; Deckard was second to Green Cape in 1938, and Waterline beat Phar Lap in the C. B. Fisher Plate at Flemington; Hayston won the Launceston Cup in 1914 and Bucklaw won it in 1917.

He died in a private hospital and following a service at St John the Baptist Anglican Church, Lilydale, his remains were interred in the local cemetery.

== Family ==
Syme married Amy Horne on 13 February 1895; they had four daughters:

- Kathleen Alice Syme (1896–1977), journalist, company director and welfare worker
- Hilda Elaine Syme (1897–1972) married Cyril James Dennis (not the noted writer) on 7 August 1923.
- (Edith) Amy Syme (1899–1975) married Reginald Johnston on 19 September 1928.
- Ursula Marjorie Syme (1903–1971) married Noel Mason on 28 August 1941.

Syme married again, to Hilda Kathleen Moroney (died 30 January 1952)
