= Valayanad =

Village in Kerala, India

Coordinates: 11.7094°N 76.0955°E

Valayanad is a village in Kozhikode taluk, in Kozhikode District, Kerala, India. It is one of 53 villages in the taluk. The village office is situated at Cheriya Mankav, near the Mankav bypass road.
