= Govindapuram, Kozhikode =

Govindapuram
- town
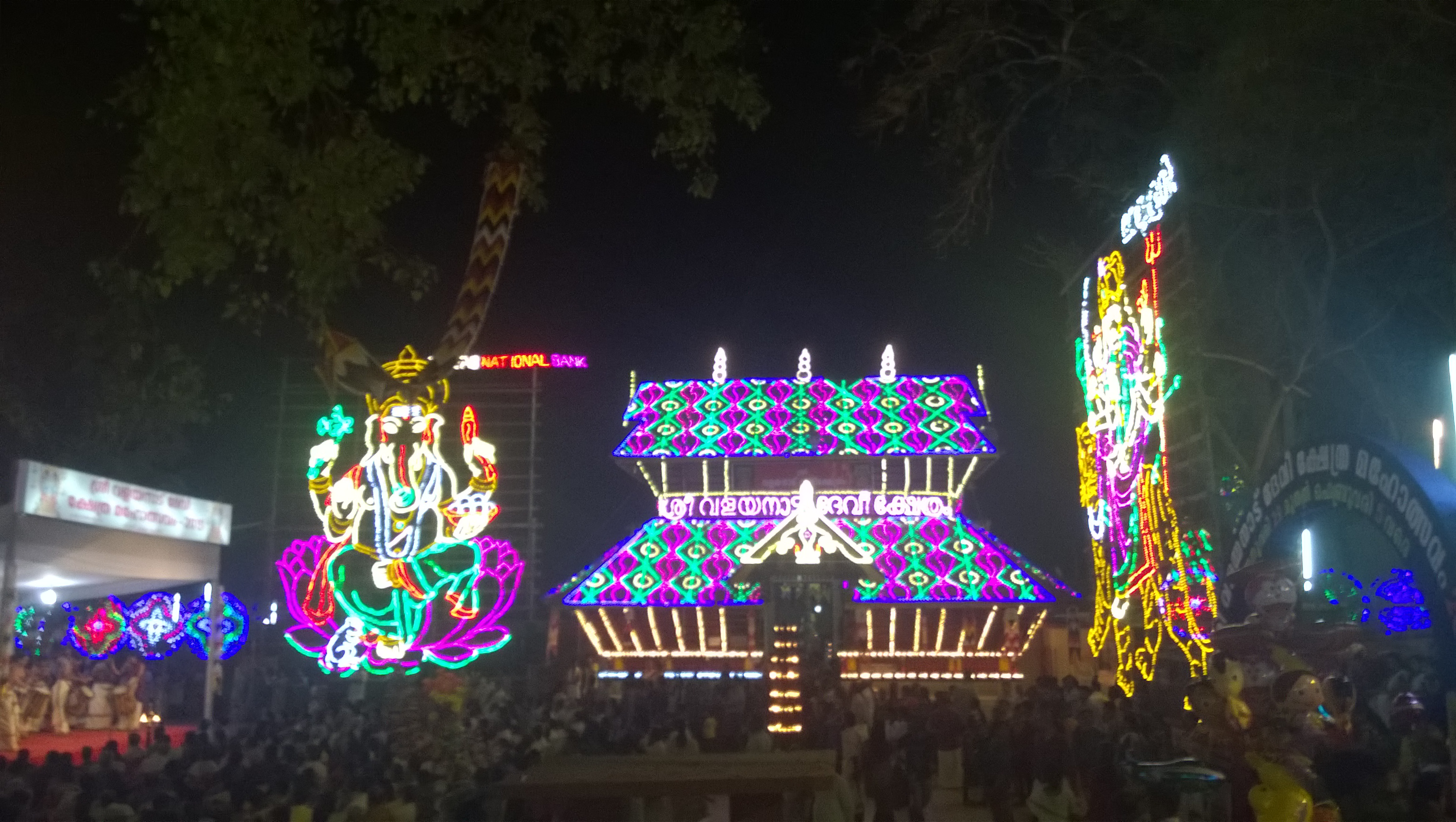
- Valayanad Temple at Govindapuram

- Location in Kerala, India
- Coordinates: 11°14′0″N 75°48′0″E
- Country: India
- State: Kerala
- District: Kozhikode

Languages
  - Official: Malayalam, English
- Time zone: UTC+5:30 (IST)
- PIN: 673016
- Telephone code: 0495
- Vehicle registration: KL-11

Govindapuram is a small suburb of Kozhikode (Calicut) city in the Kozhikode District of Kerala, India. Govindapuram is a small corporation block that comes under Calicut corporation.

== Location ==
Govindapuram lies towards east of the Kozhikode city about 5 kilometers from the center of the city. Govindapuram is primarily residential. It is one of the finest residential areas in the Calicut city and lies close to the city but in a calm atmosphere.

== History ==
In September 2022 it was reported there was some social disorder in the suburb.

== Temples ==
There are more than 13 temples in Govindapuram. This includes Valayanad Devi Temple, Hrishipuram Shiva Temple and Parthasarathy Temple. It is half a kilometre from Kuthiravattam.

=== Sree Valayanad Devi Temple ===
Valayanad Devi Temple is a popular Temple in Calicut situated in Govindapuram. This Devi temple at Valayanad has its own distinct identity and is different in several respects from other Devi temples in this country. The famous Sree Valayanad Devi Temple in Kozhikode one of the rate "Saktheya Temples" where pooja is performed in accordance with practice of "Rurujit" worship.

=== Temple history ===
Sree Valayanad Bagavathy is the family deity of Zamorin Swaroopam. Despite the great army and financial strength of the Zamorin Raja he could not subjugate Valluvakkonathiri who as his political foe in their struggle for power. The Zamorin who could not win his battle against Valluvakkonathiri understood that the reason for his failure in the battle was due to Valluvakkonathiri's high spiritual strength. Valluvakkonathiri acquired this power because of his intense worship of Devi. Therefore, the Zamorin Raja also started worshipping Devi intensely. Devi was immensely pleased with the Zamorin and appeared before him. The Zamorin pleaded with the Devi to come over his place and settle there Devi who agreed to do so was ceremoniously led to his place and consecrated at Valayanad in Kozhikode. After this he worshipped Devi permanently from Valayanad. This is the traditional belief relating to this temple.

== Festivals ==
Annual temple festival commence every year on the day of Karthika of Makaram and continues for seven days. There will be "Kalamezhuthupattu" from 1st Vrichikam for forty one days during the Mandala season.

== Other landmarks ==
The major public establishments of Kendriya Vidyalaya No2, Model ITI, Govindapuram UP School and the Govindapuram Public Library. Kovilakam Residency, Malabar Institute of Medical Sciences Hospital and the Punjab National Bank Regional Office are also major landmarks. Govindapuram is also home to major automobile dealerships like Maruti-Suzuki, Hyundai, Honda Cars and motorcycles etc. and many apartments, villas, restaurants of star facilities. Govindapuram is a very scenic place and you can see the entire city and even the Arabian Sea from the central school hills. Govindapuram is in between Mankav town and Kozhikode Medical College. There is a sanitarium for mental patients at Kuthiravattom near Puthiyara.

== Gallery ==
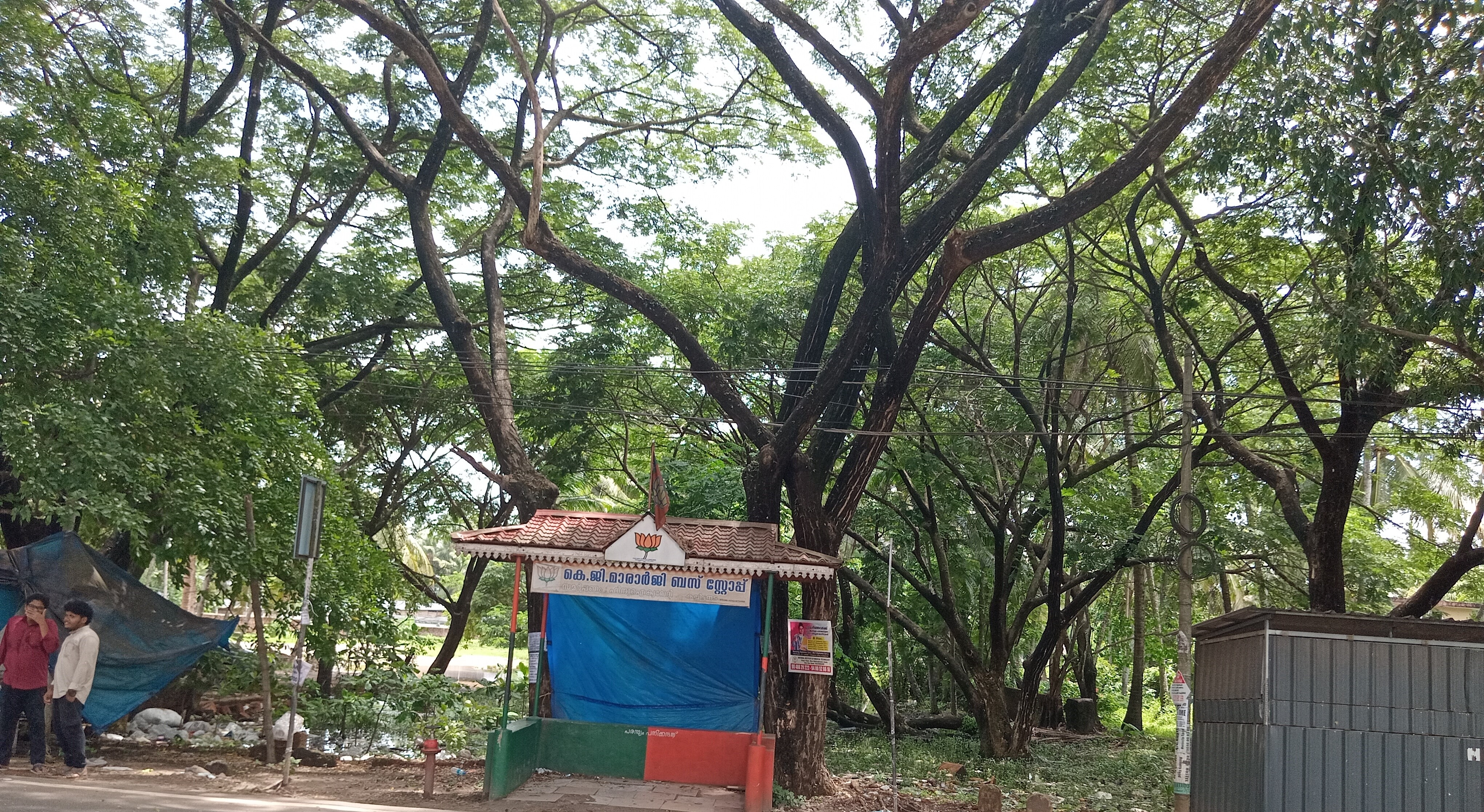
MIMS Bus stop

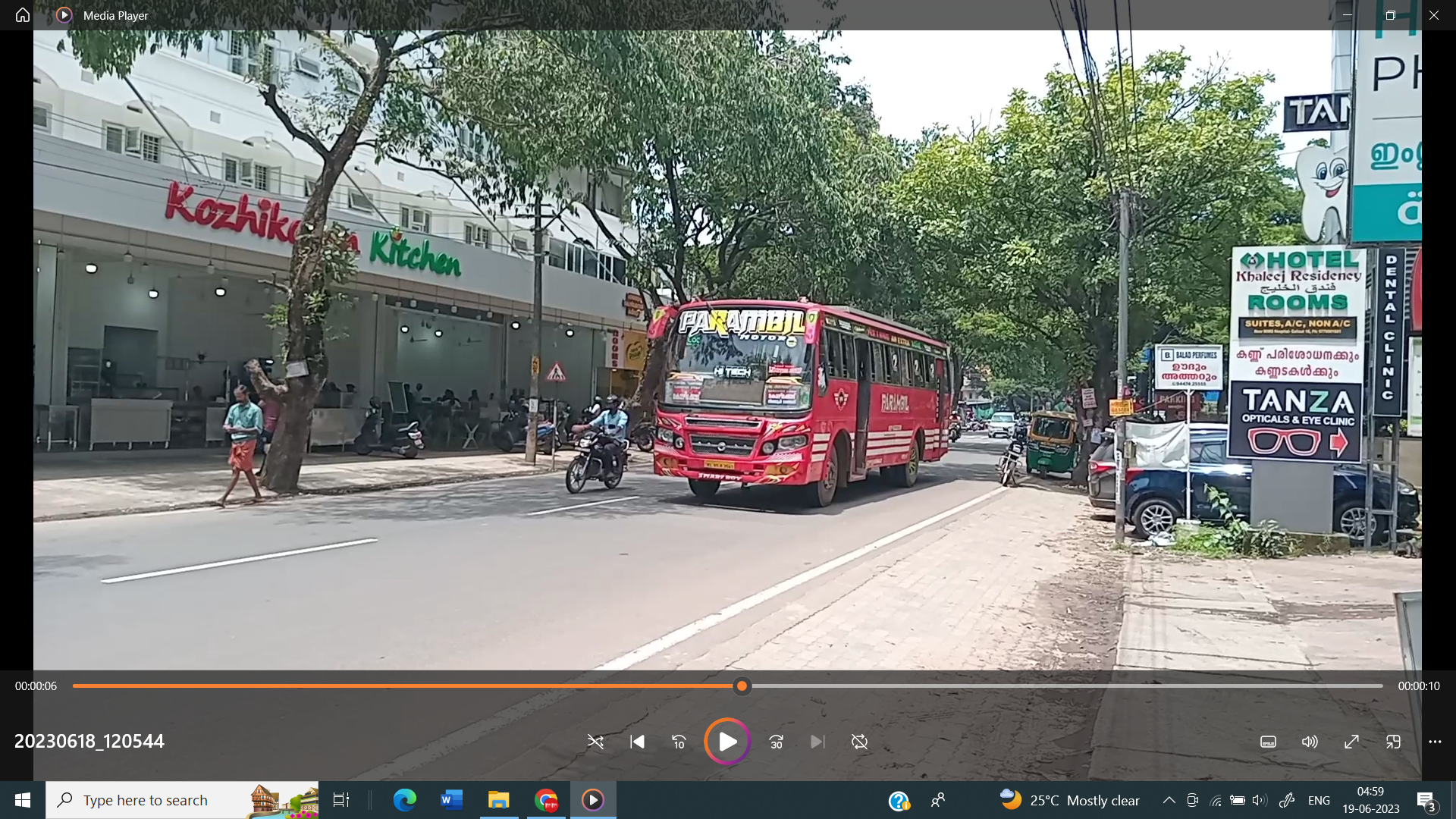
Kozhikode Kitchen Restaurant

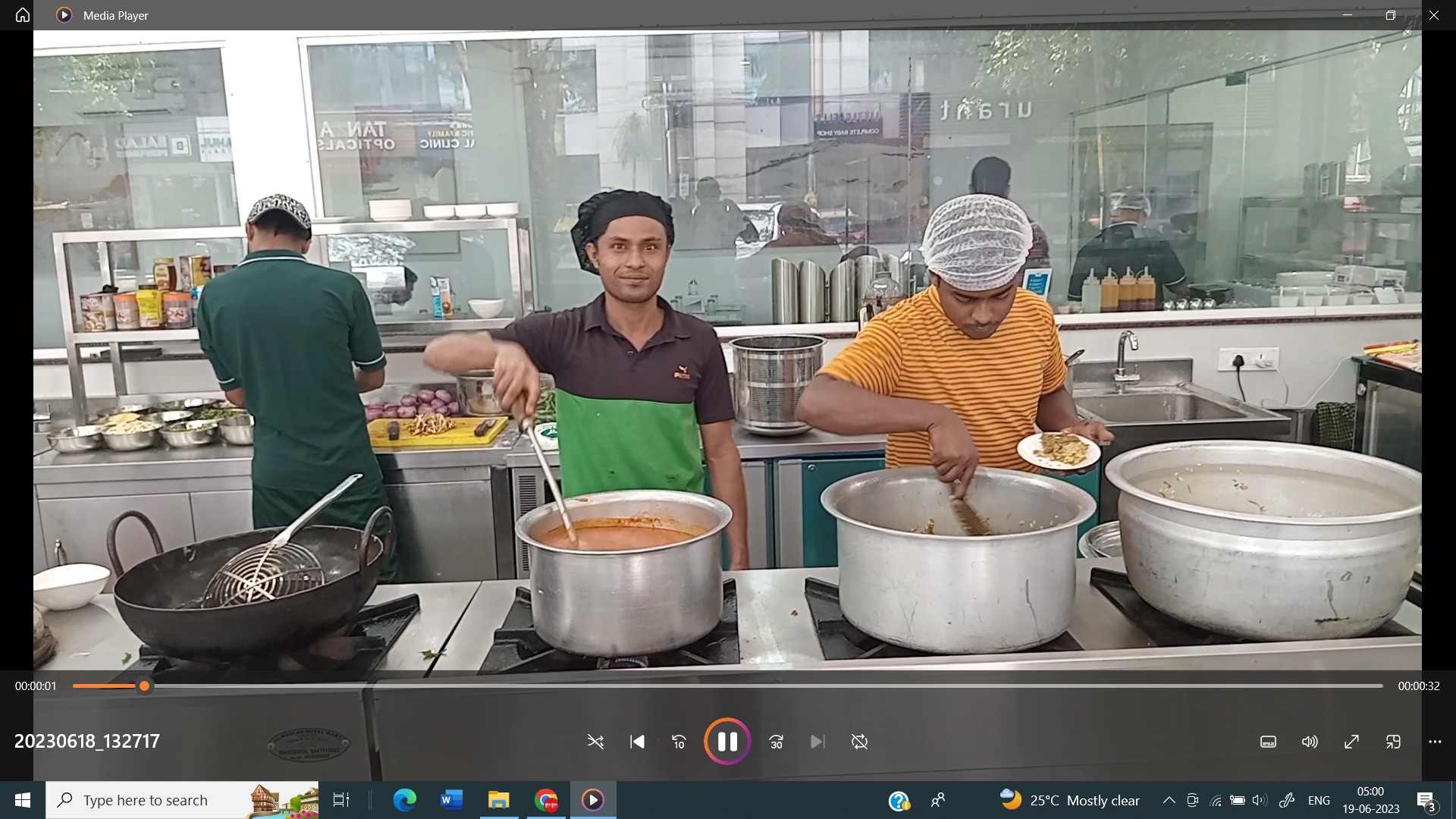

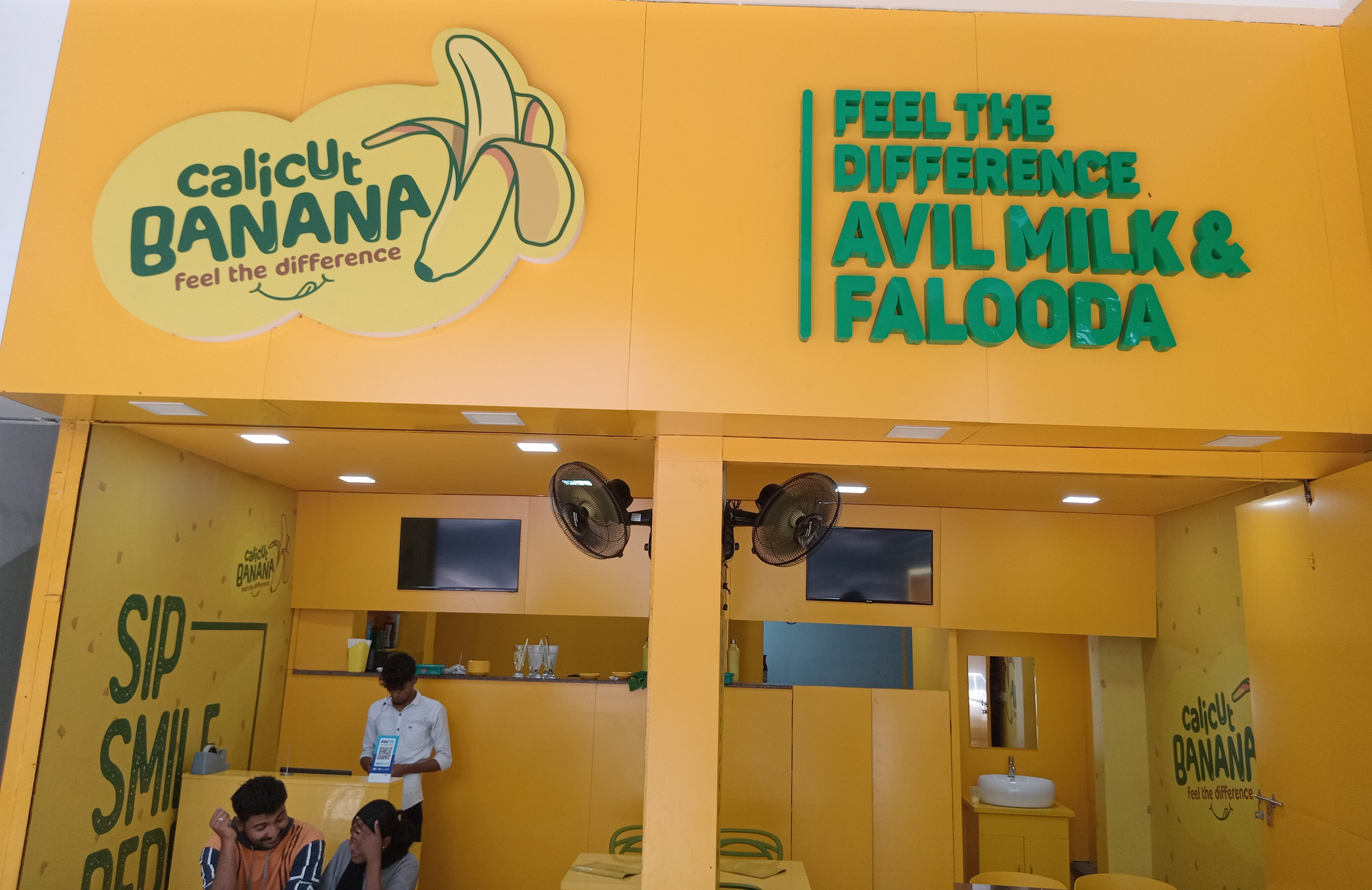
Calicust Banana Coolbar
