= Azhakodi Devi Temple =

Hindu temple in Kerala, India

Azhakodi Devi Mahakshethram
- Azhakodi Devi Temple, Thiruthiyad, Kozhikode, Kerala

Religion
- Affiliation: Hinduism
- District: Kozhikode
- Deity: Durga
- Festivals: Uthrattadi Nakshathram (Medam), Thiruvathira Nakshathram
- Governing body: Azhakodi Devi Mahakshethram Temple Trust [Malabar Devaswom Board]

Location
- Location: Thiruthiyad
- State: Kerala
- Country: India
- Interactive map of Azhakodi Devi Mahakshethram
- Coordinates: 11°15′50″N 75°47′21″E

Architecture
- Type: Traditional Kerala style
- Creator: Kozhikode samoothiri

Specifications
- Temple: One
- Elevation: 35.88 m (118 ft)

Azhakodi Devi Temple (Malayalam: അഴകൊടി ദേവീക്ഷേത്രം) or Azhakodi Devi Mahakshethram is a Hindu temple located in Thiruthiyad, Kozhikode District, Kerala, South India. It is one of the famous Devi temples, situated hardly 1.5 km away from the Mofussil Bus stand and 2.5 km from the KSRTC Bus stand, the area still retains the beauty and charm of un-spoilt rural settings within the heart of the Kozhikode city. The temple and the Kalayana Mandapom (Azhakodi Devi Mandiram) are administered by the Malabar Devaswom Board.

The most ancient and historically renowned temple "Azhakodi Devi Mahashekthram" has its deity in the form of "Bhadrakali" in a calm disposition. The temple consists of seven maternal incarnations: Brahmani, Maheshvari, Kaumari, Vaishnavi, Varahi, Indrani and Chamundi. A sivalinga is also present.

There is a legend behind this temple, that the samoothiri entrusted six of his generals to the temple "Arikkodikkavu" which is now renowned as Azhakodi Devi mahashekthram. An idol of "Bhavani Devi" was also given by the samoothiri which was given to him by the traders of Gujarat. The generals were instructed to place the idol adjacent to the "Bhagavathi Idol" in the "Arikkodikkavu" sreekovil and worship the same. The temple till 1965 known as "Arikkodikkavu" was later renamed as "Azhakodi Devi Mahashekthram".

During the Malayalam month of "Medom", Kodiyettem is celebrated on the "Uthrattadi Nakshathram". Pallivetta is celebrated on the "Thiruvathira Nakshathram", and "Arrattu" is conducted on the "Punartham Nakshathram"."Bhagavatha Saptaham" is also conducted every year. The other festivals are "Navarathri Mahotsavam" and "Vijayadasami Pooja".

This temple is situated at Thiruthiyad which is at the heart of the Kozhikode city. This temple is governed by the elected members. The Malabar Devaswom Board has a direct access towards the day-to-day activities of the temple.

== Historic snippets ==
Centuries ago, the site of ‘Azhakodi Devi Mahashekthram’ was believed to have been an islet bordered by ocean in the west. Because of its islet form, the region was then called ‘Thuruthnadu’. ‘Thuruthu’ meaning islet and ‘Nadu’ meaning region. But with time, ‘Thuruthunadu’ came to be known as ‘Thiruthiyadu’. Writing the letter 'Aaaaa' on the tip of the child’s tongue, many seek the blessing of ‘Vidhya Devi’ (The goddess of knowledge). It is indeed a spectacle to see hundreds of children gathered at the temple on the day of Vidhyarambham’ to be initiated into learning. It is during the full moon phase in the month of ‘Ashwini’ that the ‘Navarathri’ festival is celebrated all over India. In Bengal the 10-day festival is celebrated as ‘Durga pooja’, while in Karnataka it is celebrated as ‘Dussera’. In kerala it is celebrated as ‘Saraswathi pooja’. The 10th day of the celebration is marked as Lord Rama’s victory over the demon king ‘Ravana’. This festival is also known as ‘Ayudha Pooja’, meaning the worship of weapons. The 10-day-long ‘Saraswathi Pooja’ is celebrated in grant manner every year.

One of the most popular offerings to the goddess at ‘Azhakodi Devi Mahashekthram’ is the ‘Swayamvara Pushpanjali’, offered by young girls of marriageable age. Young girls, from far & wide, make the offering hoping to win a suitor and thousands will bear testimony to the goddess’s benevolence.

Ancient sculptures have it that the saffron powder, ‘Sindhoor’, on the forehead of the ‘Apsaras’, Urvasi and Menaka and the shimmer of the rubies on the Deva’s crown are caused by the red colour on Devi’s feet. It is believed that when they pay respect to Devi by lying prostrate; touching the Devi’s feet, their forehead or crown touch & take the ‘sindhoor’ from her feet. The ‘sindhoor’ on the forehead of married women symbolizes that they have said their prayers and paid respect to Devi. Azhakodi Devi Mahashekthram’ is unique because it is the only temple in Kerala which has two forms of Devi as the deities.

The idol of lord shiva at ‘Azhakodi Devi Mahashekthram’ symbolizes ‘Anthimahakaalan’ dancing at dusk, while Nataraja symbolizes the rhythmic Thandava danced by Lord Shiva, ‘Anthimahakaalan’ is the sensuous dance performed by him along with goddess ‘Parvathi’.

One’s visit to ‘Azhakodi Devi Mahashekthram’ is not considered complete, unless he or she visits the ‘Kizhakkekavu’ (the kavu on the east). This is so because it is believed that ‘Kali’ the goddess who protects us is believed to be the deity at the ‘Kizhakkekavu’.

One of the wonders of ‘Azhakodi Devi Mahashekthram’ was the banayan tree on the eastern side of the main entrance to the temple. On the Banyan tree’s trunk, about six feet above the ground, a palm tree grew, tall and healthy. Together, they used to look like a mother carrying her child on her hip. For years, they remained a great sight for one and all. A wonder indeed!

== Period of Zamorins ==
Legend has it that the erstwhile ruler of "Kozhikode", the Samoothiri, gave six of his generals to the temple "Arikkodikkavu", which is presently the renowned "Azhakodi Devi Mahashekthram". The Samoothiri also gave them an Idol of ‘Bavani Devi’ which had been given to him by traders from Gujarath. He instructed his generals to place the idol adjacent to the ‘Baghavathi’ idol in the ‘Arikkodikkavu’ Sreekovil (sanctum sanctorum) and worship the same. During Tippu Sultan's ‘Padayottam’ the priests of ‘Arikkodikavu’, to safeguard the Idol, are believed to have pulled out the Idol and hidden it in the temple’s tank. It was a practice during the British rule to try the accused.

== Mahatmyam ==
The presiding deity at ‘Azhakodi Devi mahashekthram’ is Devi in the form of ‘Bhadrakali’ in a calm disposition. To her right is goddess ‘Bhuvaneswari’ and to her left are the seven maternal incarnations’ Brahmani, Maaheshwari, Kowmari, Vaishnavi, Vaarahi, Indrani and Chamundi. A sivalinga, too, is present.

The Studi of Azhakodi Devi mahashekthram Bhadrakali bedecked with Sword, Kapalam, Trident, Crescent Moon, and Snake; and as fair as a new cloud is the incarnation at ‘Azhakodi Devi Mahashekthram’. Devi blesses her devotees with long lasting married life. She protects her devotees from enemies and she bestows knowledge.

=== Shastha ===
Lord ‘Shastha’ along with his wife ‘Prabha’, son ‘Sathyakan’ and decorated in red is the deity here. To his right is ‘Dhakshinamurthi’ and to his left is the elephant god, ‘Ganapathi’. Meditating lord Dhakshinamurthi Having lost his wife ‘Sati’ in ‘Dhakshayaga’ lord ‘Shiva’ meditated. Dhakshinamurthi is the meditative form of Lord Shiva.

=== Ganapathi ===
‘Ganapathi’ is the son of lord ‘Shiva’ and ‘Parvathi’. His Idols are present at the Agnikone of the Devi’s shrine and also adjacent to that of lord ‘Shastha’.

=== Unnithripurandakan ===
‘Thripuras’, the demons, pleased lord ‘Shiva’ and gained powers that made them unconquerable. When they started abusing their mighty powers, lord ‘Shiva’ through his third eye gave form to an incarnation that reduced the ‘Tripuras’ to ashes. This incarnation of lord ‘Shiva’, ‘Unnithripurandakan’ presides there.

=== Anthimahakalan ===
Lord ‘Shiva’, posing as a dancer at dusk is known as ‘Anthimahakalan’.

=== Sreekrishna ===
The child of ‘Devaki’ and ‘Vasudeva’ in his ‘Venugopala’ form (the cowherd who carries a flute) is the deity here. ‘Ashtamirohini’ and guruvayoor Ekadesi are observed there.

=== Kizhakkekavu ===
‘Kizhakkekavu’ (the kavu on the east) houses ‘Kali’ the goddess who protects the worshipers, is believed to be the deity at the ‘Kizhakkekavu’.

== See also ==
- Temples of Kerala
