= Thiruvatta Mahadeva Temple =

Hindu temple in Kerala, India

- തിരുവാറ്റാ മഹാദേവ ക്ഷേത്രം
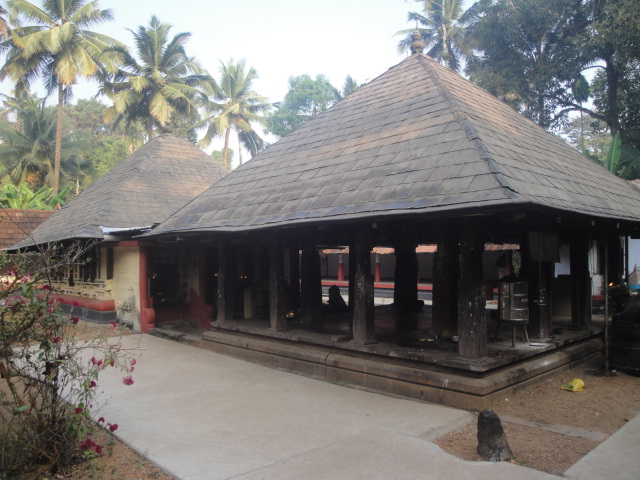
- Sreekovil (Sanctum Sanctorum), Mandapam

- Thiruvatta Mahadeva Temple, Thiruvalla, Pathanamthitta, Kerala

Religion
- Affiliation: Hinduism
- District: Pathanamthitta
- Deity: Shiva
- Festival: Maha Shivaratri

Location
- Location: Thiruvalla
- State: Kerala
- Country: India
- Interactive map of Thiruvatta Mahadeva Temple
- Coordinates: 9.374518°N 76.567228°E

Architecture
- Type: Kerala style

Specifications
- Temple: One
- Monument: 1
- Elevation: 31.14 m (102 ft)

Thiruvatta Mahadeva Temple (Malayalam: തിരുവാറ്റാ മഹാദേവക്ഷേത്രം) is an ancient Hindu temple dedicated to Lord Shiva is situated on the banks of the Manimalayar (river) in Thiruvalla of Pathanamthitta District in Kerala state in India. Reference to this temple is found in Vazhappally inscription relates to the rule of Kodungallur Chera (previously Kulasekhara) king Rama Rajasekhara and temple at Vazhappally. It is the earliest available epigraphical record mentioning a Kodungallur Chera king and written in Malayalam language. According to folklore, sage Parashurama has installed the idol of Lord Shiva in the Treta Yuga. The temple is a part of the 108 famous Shiva temples in Kerala.

== History ==
The temple is one of the earliest temples in Kerala. It is believed that the temple was built during the reign of the Second Chera dynasty by Kulasekhara Perumals who ruled over the city of Mahodayapuram. The oldest inscriptions found at the Kerala, the Vazhappally copper plate, mention about this Siva temple. The Thiruvatta Temple and the Vazhappally Maha Siva Temple have been associated with since the days of the Chera kingdom.

== Temple Architecture ==
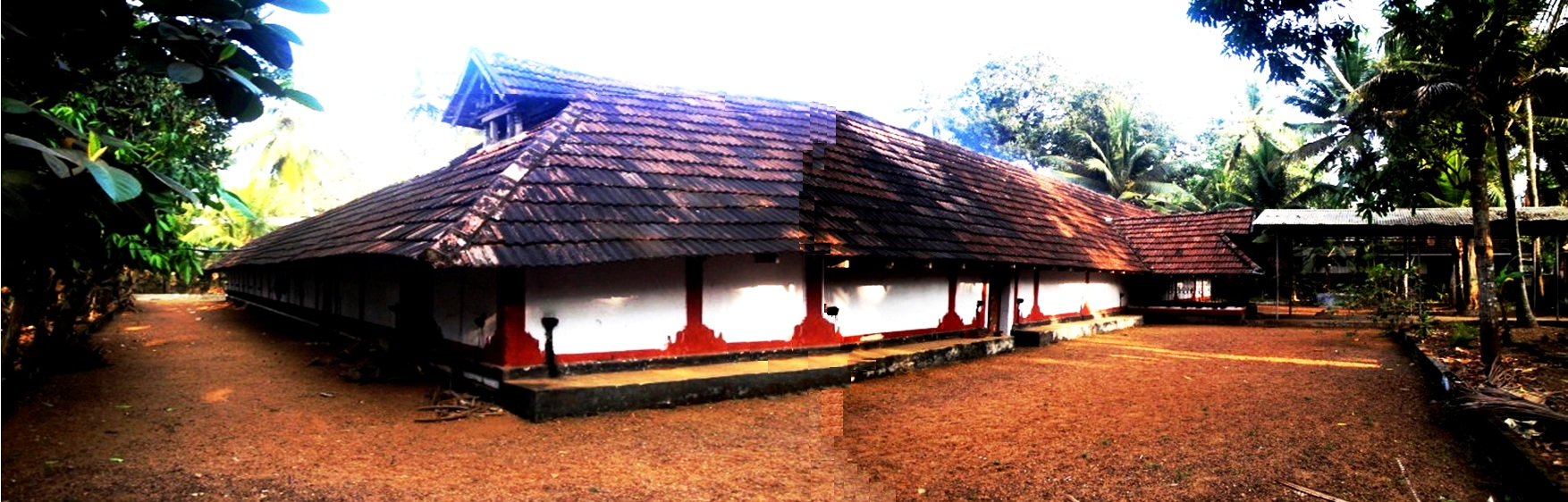
Nalampalam

Main Sanctum Sanctorum: The temple is located a little away from the banks of the Manimalayar (river) at Thiruvalla. The Swayambhu Shiva Lingam is dedicated to the inside of a square Sanctum Sanctorum. The presiding deity of the temple is Lord Shiva as Thiruvatta Thevar, facing East. The self-glorious Shiva lingam is placed a little lower inside the sanctum. Because of the low statue of the temple, the sacred statues of the valiya balikallu (great sacrifice stone) and the Nirmalayadhari are depicted. The Ganapati is located in the south east corner of the main shrine. The walls of the main shrine in rectangular shape is made of granite and the top is covered with copper plate.

Nalambalam: Nalambalam of the temple is very wide quadrangle. The walls of nalambalam is made of limestone. There are two shrines inside the Nalambalam. The main shrine has a self-contained Shiva lingam and a very tall rectangular shrine to the south of it. There are two shrines inside the nalamabalam. The main shrine has a swayambhoo Shiva linga and second shrine has a big shiva linga installed separately. During the year, the main sanctum sanctorum sinks with rain water and the Arattu abhishekam is performed on the day of Lord Shiva (Thiruvata Thevar.) When the main Shiva Linga sinks, the routine pooja of temple is placed in the south shrine of Shiva linga.

Mandapom: On the east side is a main shrine a namaskara mandapom built with a rectangular shape. In the sanctum and the mandapam also covered with copper plate. The nambalam and its adjoining balikkal mandapam are built to reflect kerala / dravidian architecture. Similarly, stone walls are placed on the nalambalam walls of the temple.

== Temple Gallery ==
Thiruvatta Mahadeva Temple

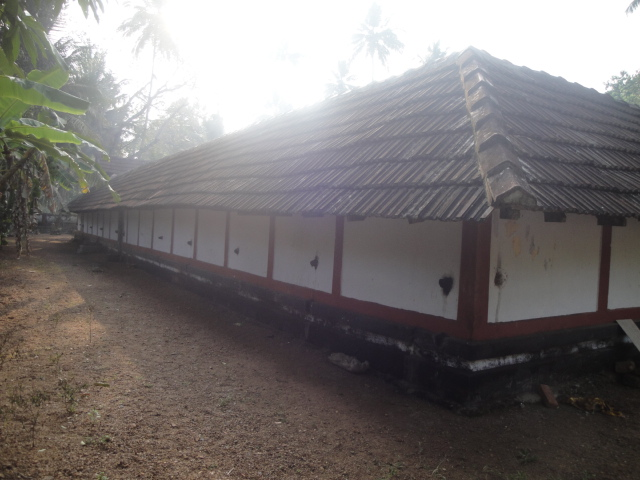
Nalambalam

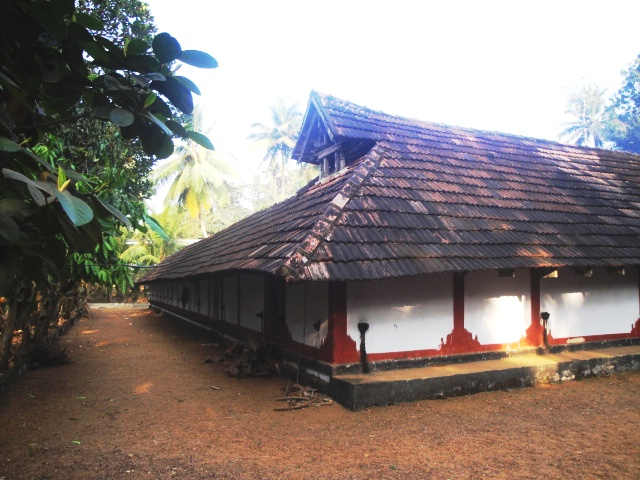
Ampalavattom

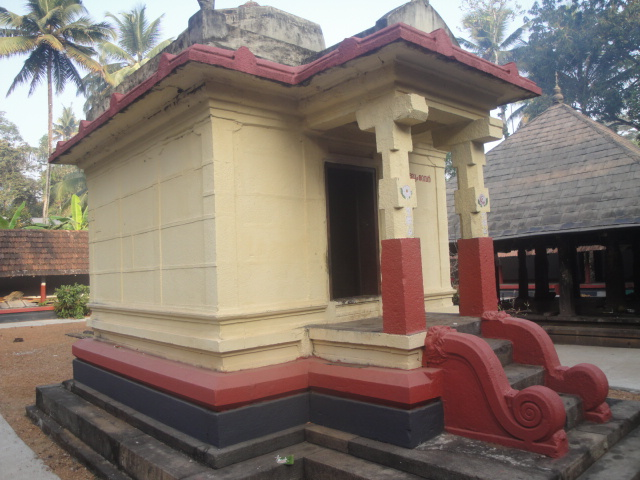
Second Shrine

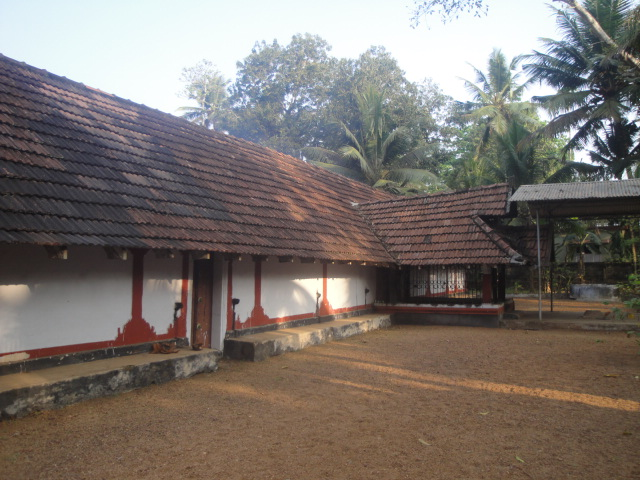
Nalambalam

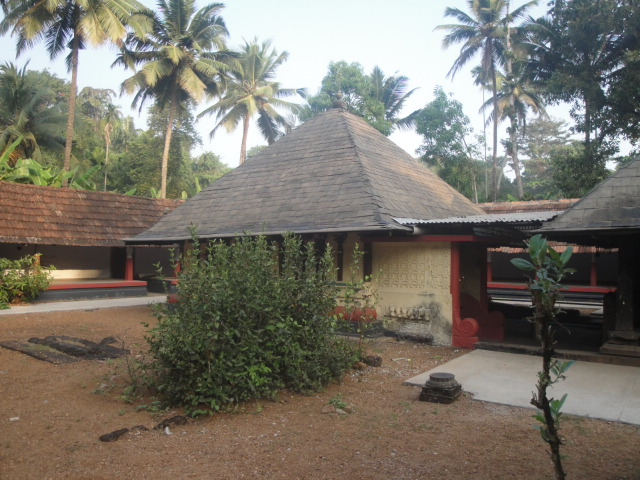
Sreekovil

== See also ==
- 108 Shiva Temples
- Vazhappally Maha Siva Temple
- Vazhappally copper plate
- Sreevallabha Temple
