= Old Malayalam =

Earliest form of Malayalam (c. mid-9th to c. 12th century CE)

- Early Malayalam
- പഴയ മലയാളം Paḻaya Malayāḷam
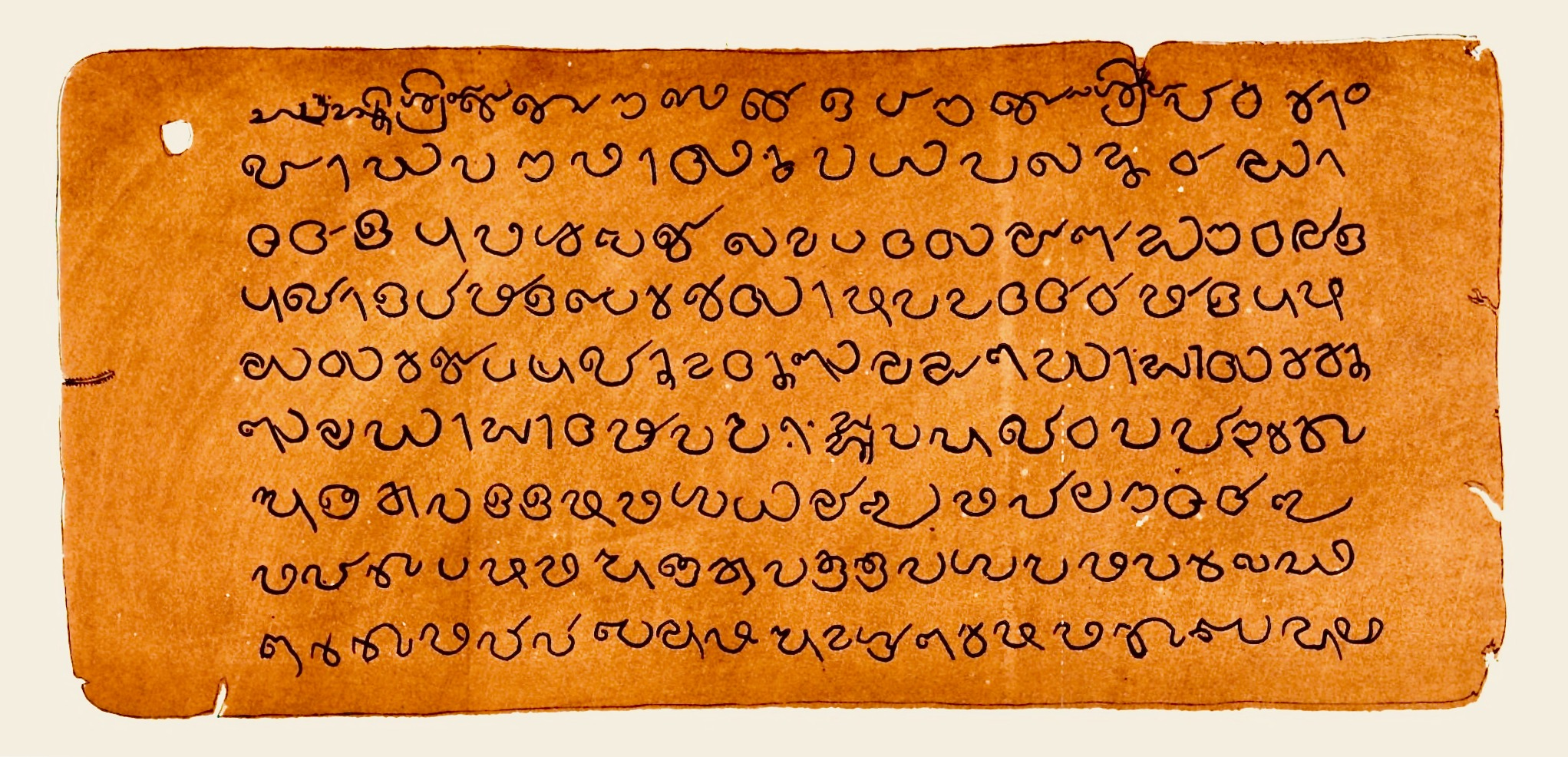
- Old Malayalam (Vattezhuthu script)
- Region: Kerala (majority)
- Era: Developed into Middle Malayalam by c. 13th century
- Language family: Dravidian: Southern; Southern I; Tamil–Kannada; Tamil–Kota; Tamil–Toda; Tamil–Irula; Tamil–Kodava–Urali; Tamil–Malayalam; Malayalamoid; Old Malayalam
- Early form: Contemporary early Middle Tamil
- Writing system: Vatteluttu script (with Pallava/Southern Grantha characters)

Language codes
- ISO 639-3: –
- Glottolog: None

Old Malayalam, or Early Malayalam, the inscriptional variety found in Kerala from c. mid-9th to c. 13th century CE, is the earliest attested form of Malayalam language. The language was employed in several administrative records and transactions (at the level of the medieval Chera kings as well as the upper-caste village temples). Old Malayalam was mostly written in Vatteluttu script (with additional Pallava/Southern Grantha characters).

== History ==
The start of the development of Old Malayalam from the West Coast dialect of contemporary Middle Tamil can be dated to c. 7th - 8th century CE. It remained a West Coast dialect until c. 9th century CE or a little later.

The formation of the language is mainly attributed to geographical separation of Kerala from the Tamil country and the influence of immigrant Tulu-Canarese Brahmins in Kerala (who also knew Sanskrit and Prakrit).

The later evolution of Old Malayalam is visible in the inscriptions dated to c. 9th to c. 12th century CE.

=== Literature ===
There is no Old Malayalam literature preserved from this period (c. 9th to c. 12th century AD). Some of the earliest extant Malayalam literary compositions appear after the early medieval period. Malayalam was historically noted for its diglossia, or existence of different varieties of the language (the prestige form, literary form, formal variety, and common colloquial dialect).

== Differences from medieval Tamil ==
Although Old Malayalam closely resembles contemporary Middle Tamil, it also shows characteristically new features. Major differences between Old Malayalam (the Chera inscriptional language) and contemporary [medieval] inscriptional/literary Tamil of the eastern country are:

- Nasalization of adjoining sounds
- Substitution of palatal sounds for dental sounds
- Contraction of vowels

== Old Malayalam inscriptions ==
Some of the discovered inscriptions in Old Malayalam are listed below in their expected chronological order, along with their locations and significance. Most of them are engraved in the Vatteluttu script, with additional Grantha characters.

Inscription	Location of Origin	Notes
Quilon Syrian copper plates (mid-9th century AD)	Kollam Port (?)	Oldest available from the early Malayalam inscription (script: Vatteluttu).
Irinjalakkuda inscription (mid-9th century AD)	Irinjalakkuda	Oldest early Malayalam temple inscription from Kerala.
Thiruvatruvay copper plate (mid-9th century AD)	Thiruvatruvay, Thiruvalla	Earliest reference to Onam Festival in Kerala.
Vazhappally copper plate (late-9th century AD)	Thiruvatruvay, Vazhappally	Mentions a coin called "dinara".

== Gallery ==
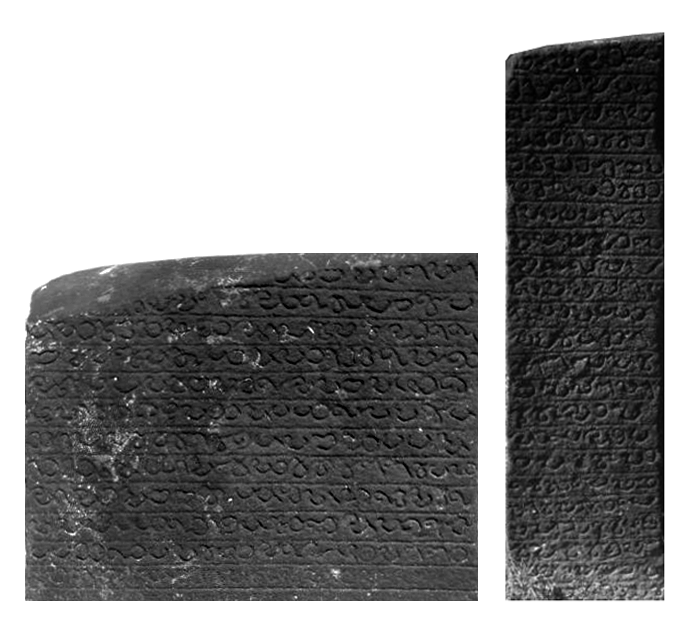
Maniyur inscription

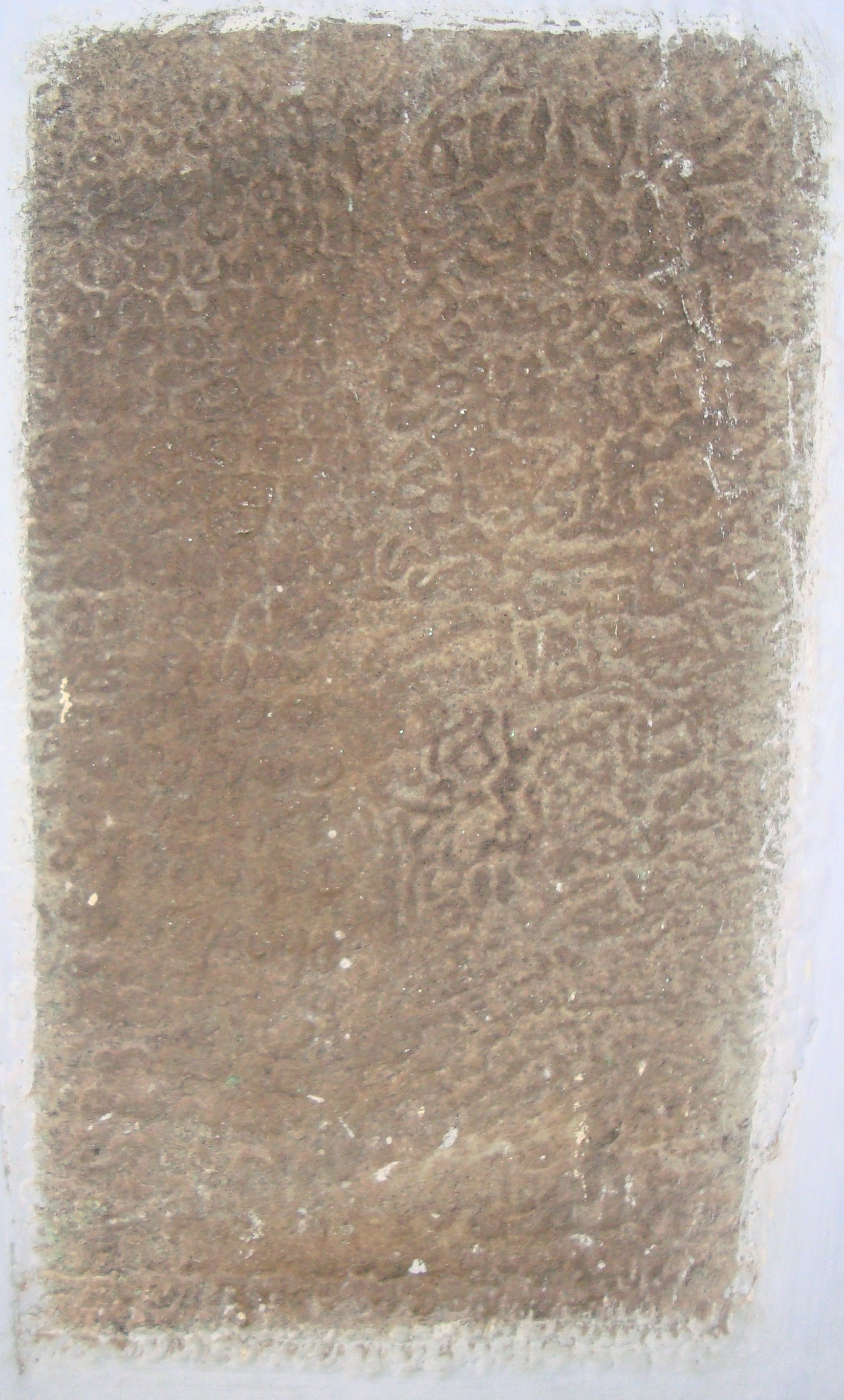
Muchundi Mosque inscription (Kozhikode)

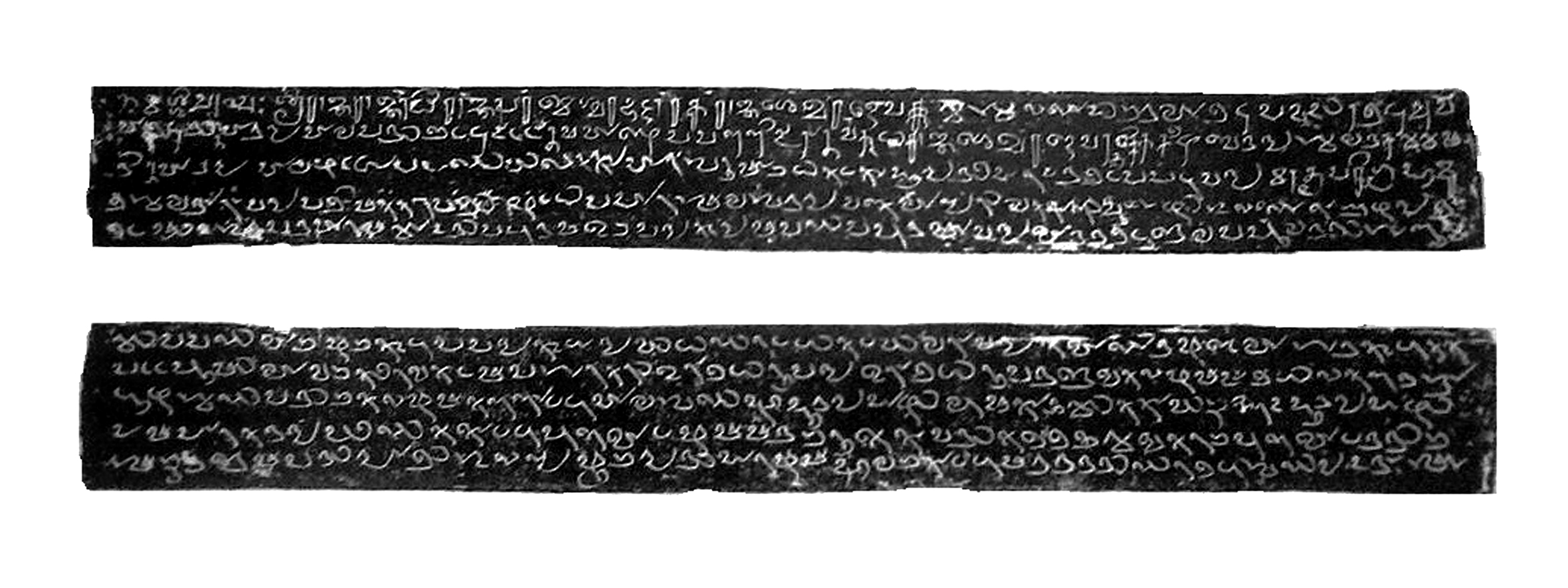
Vazhappally copper plate (Rama Rajasekhara)

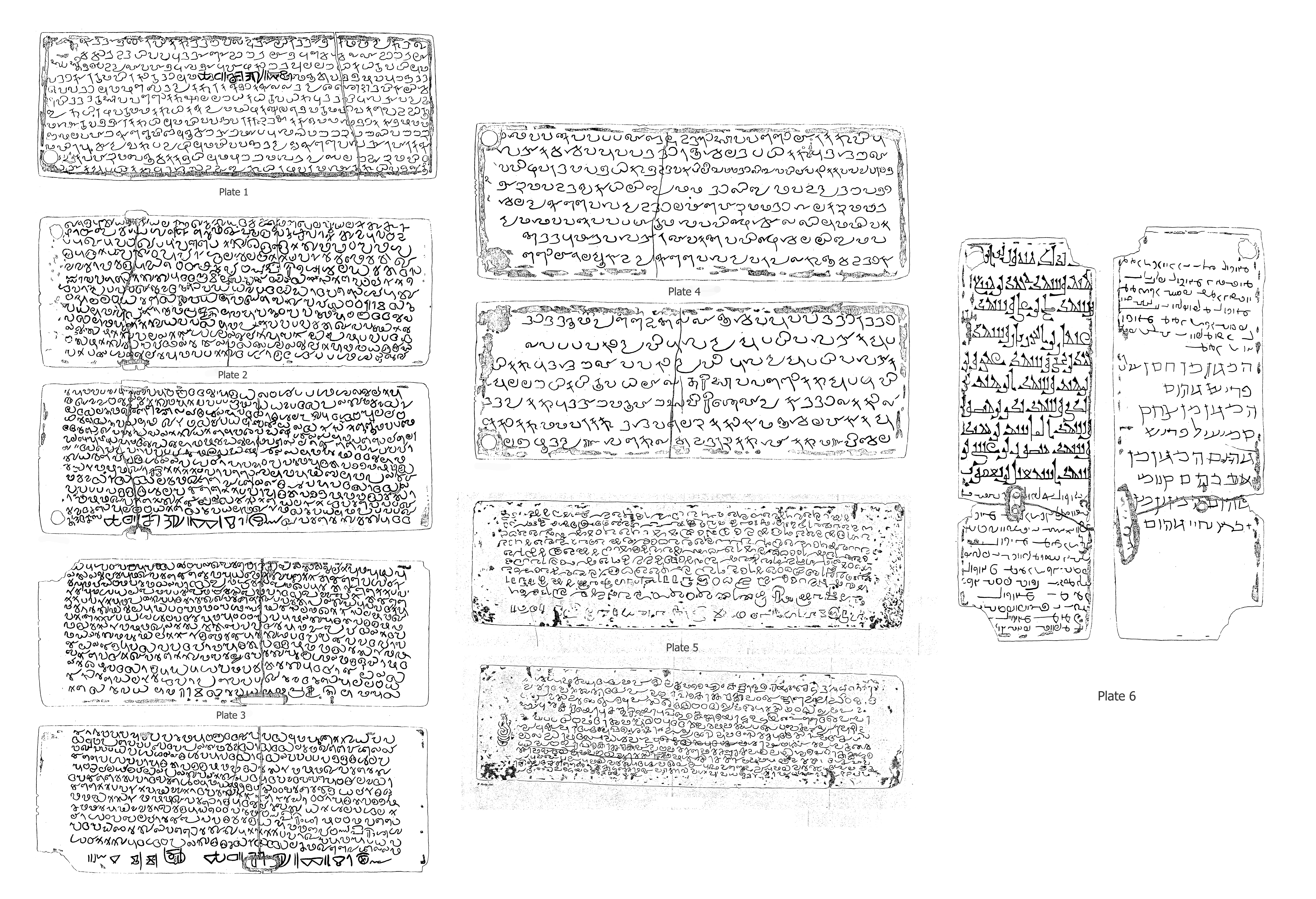
Quilon Syrian copper plates (Sthanu Ravi Kulasekhara)

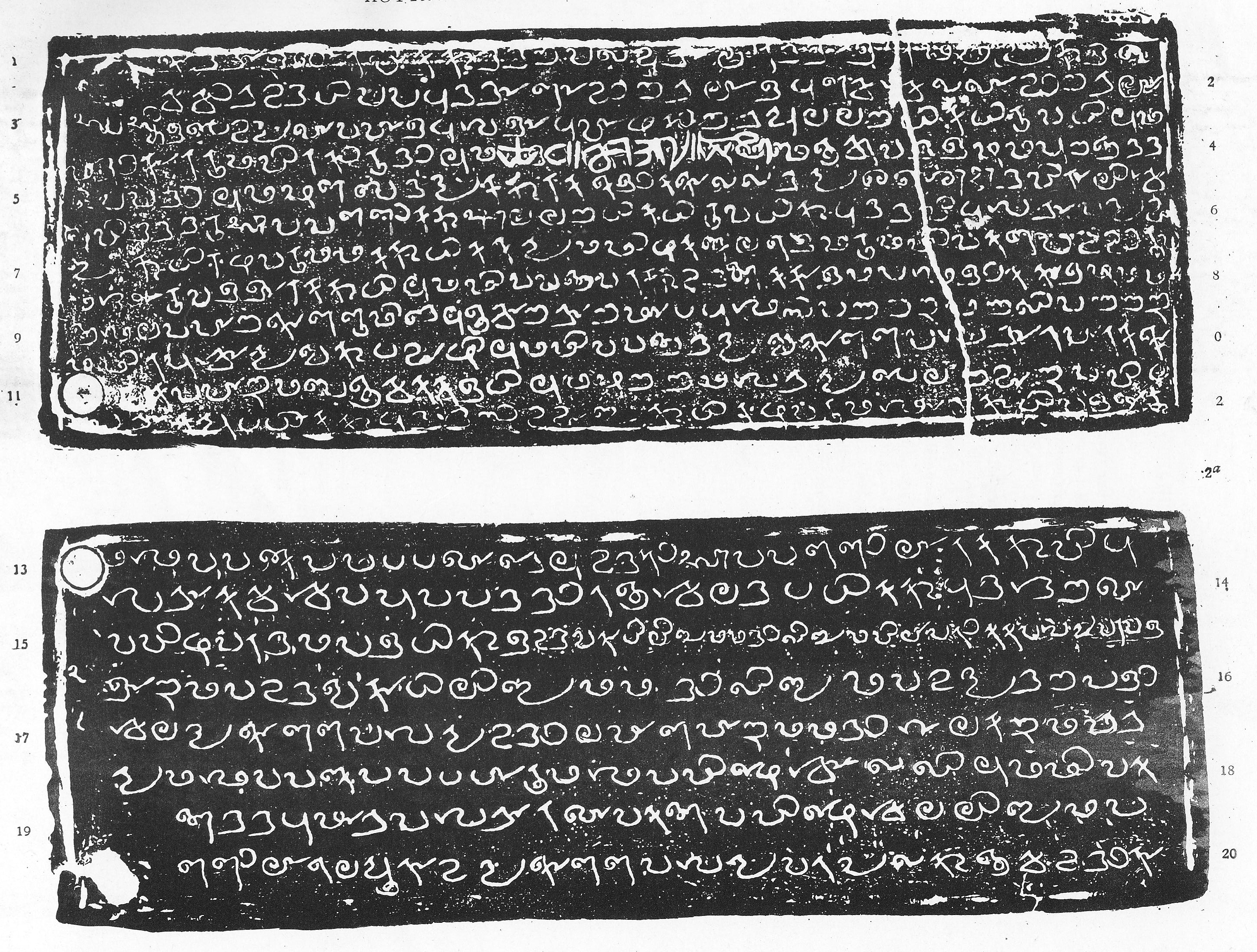
Quilon Syrian copper plates (plates 1 and 4)

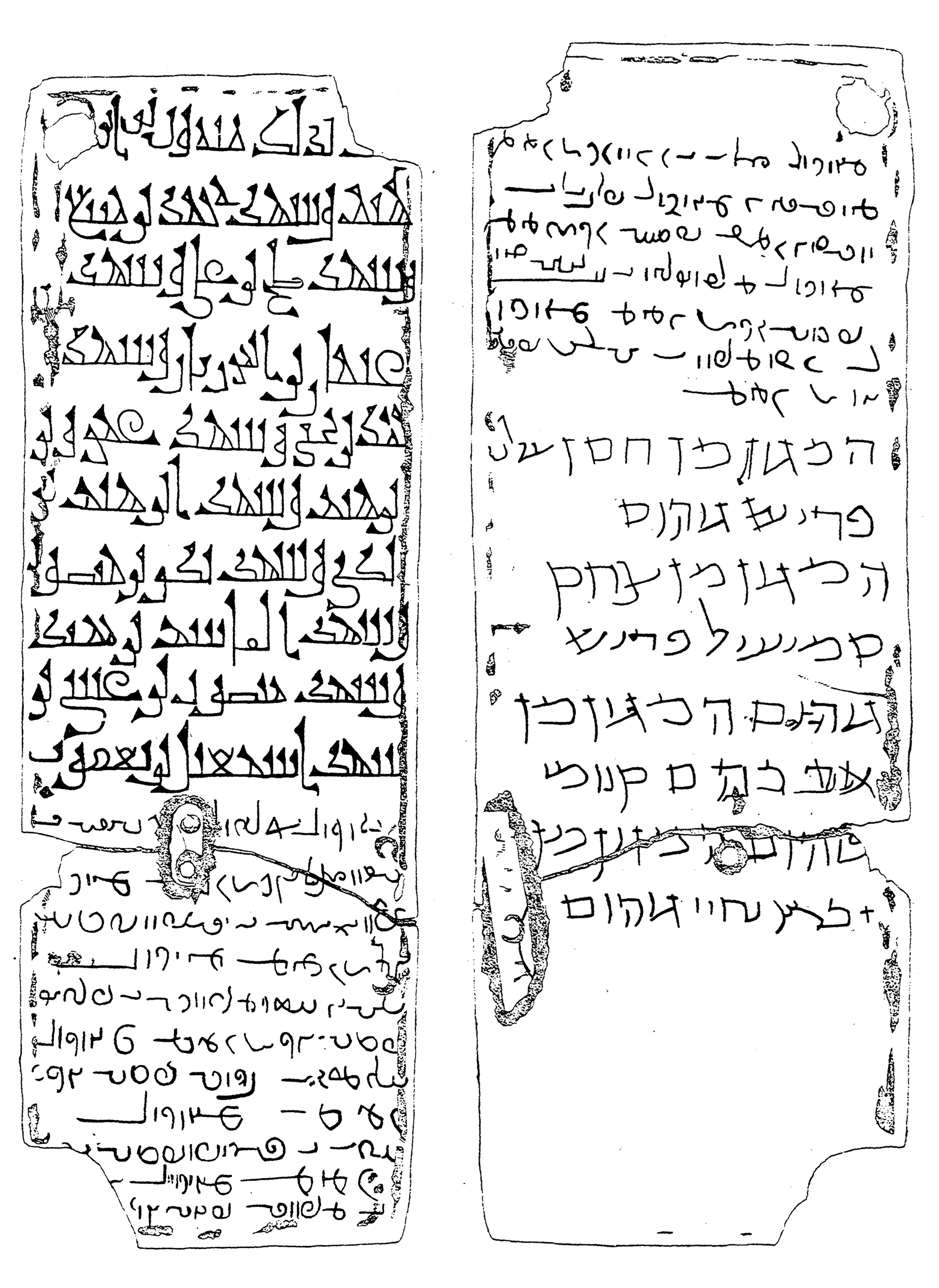
Quilon Syrian copper plates (plate 6)

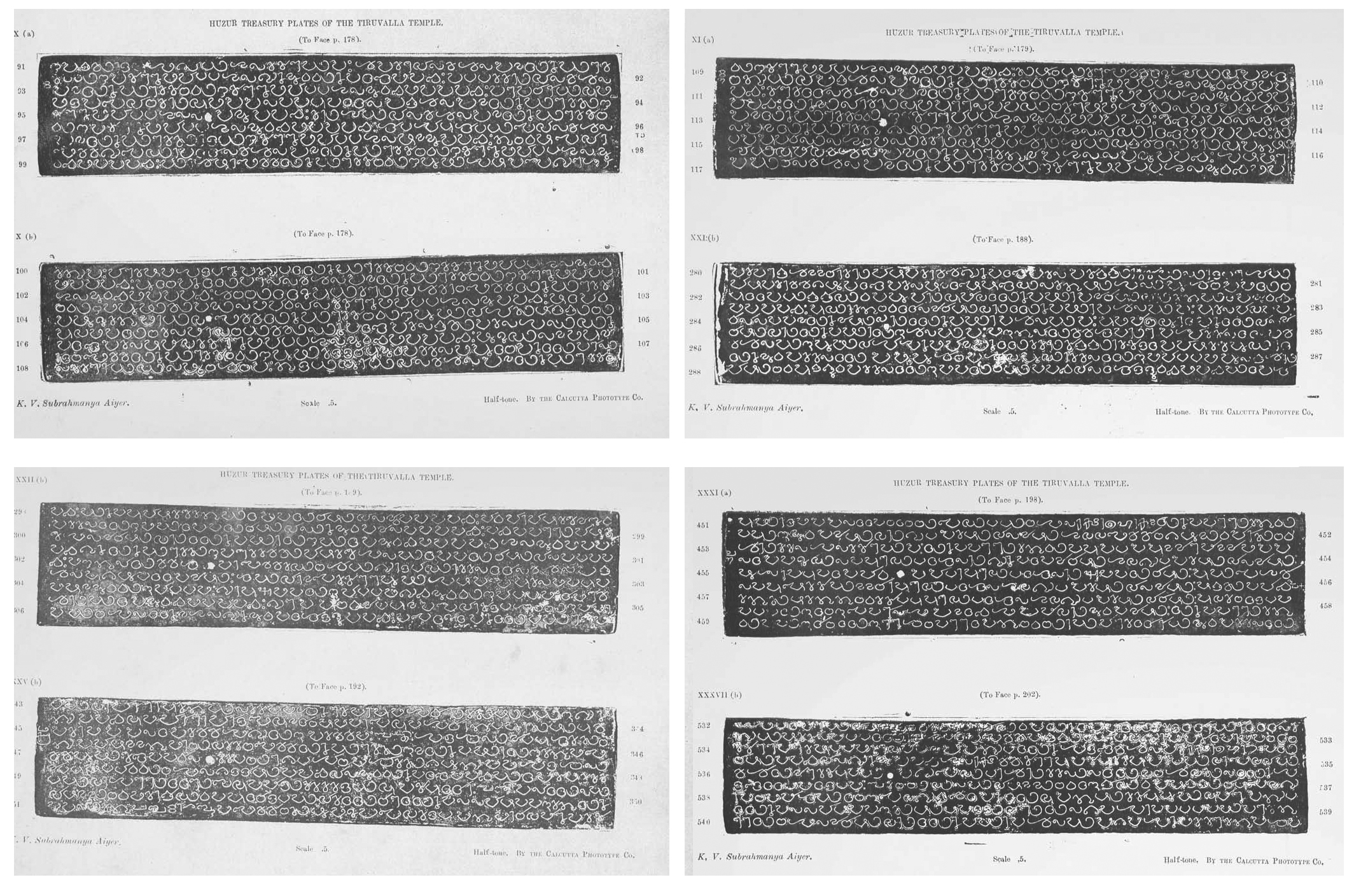
Tiruvalla copper plates

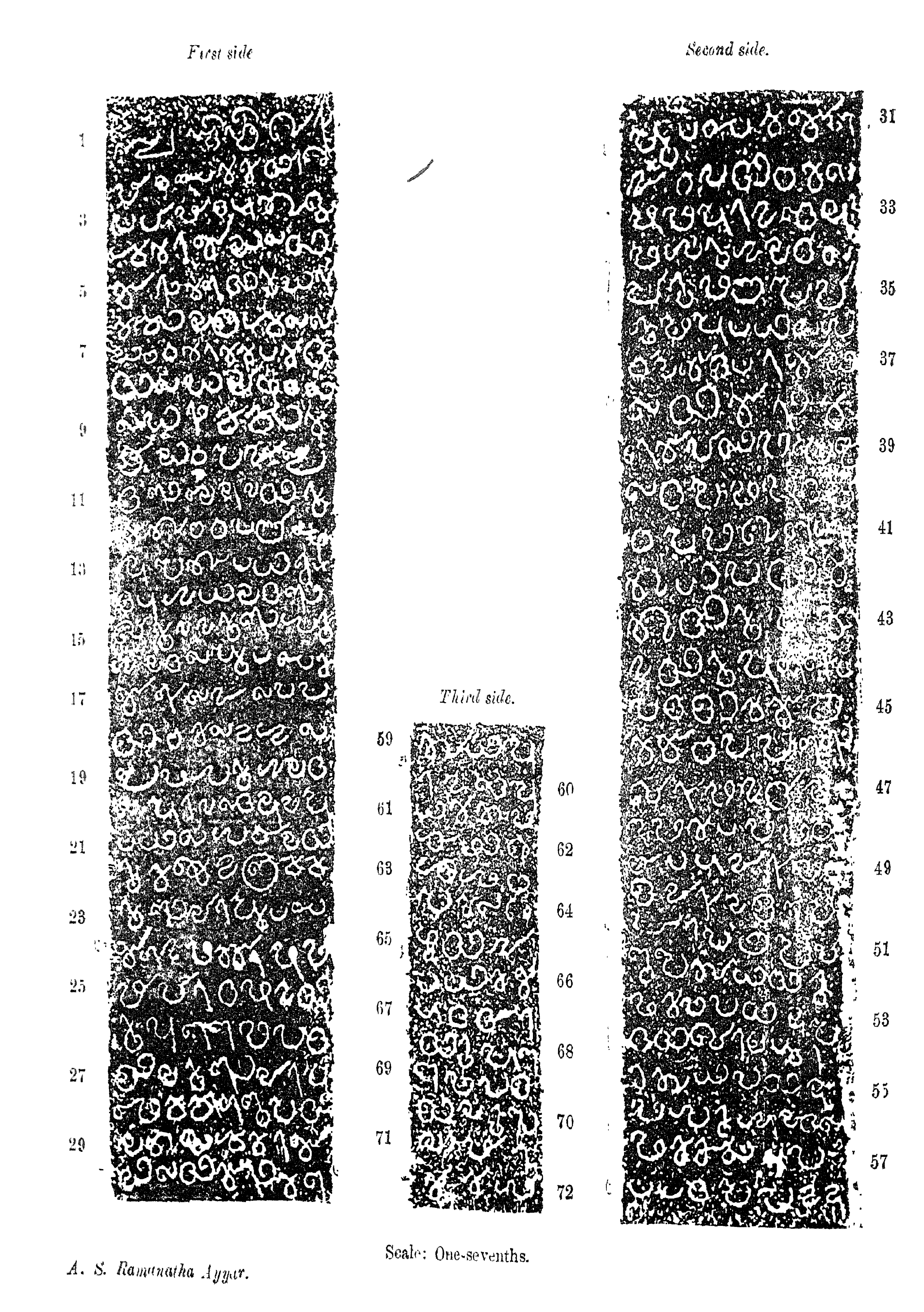
Perunna inscription (Rama Kulasekhara)

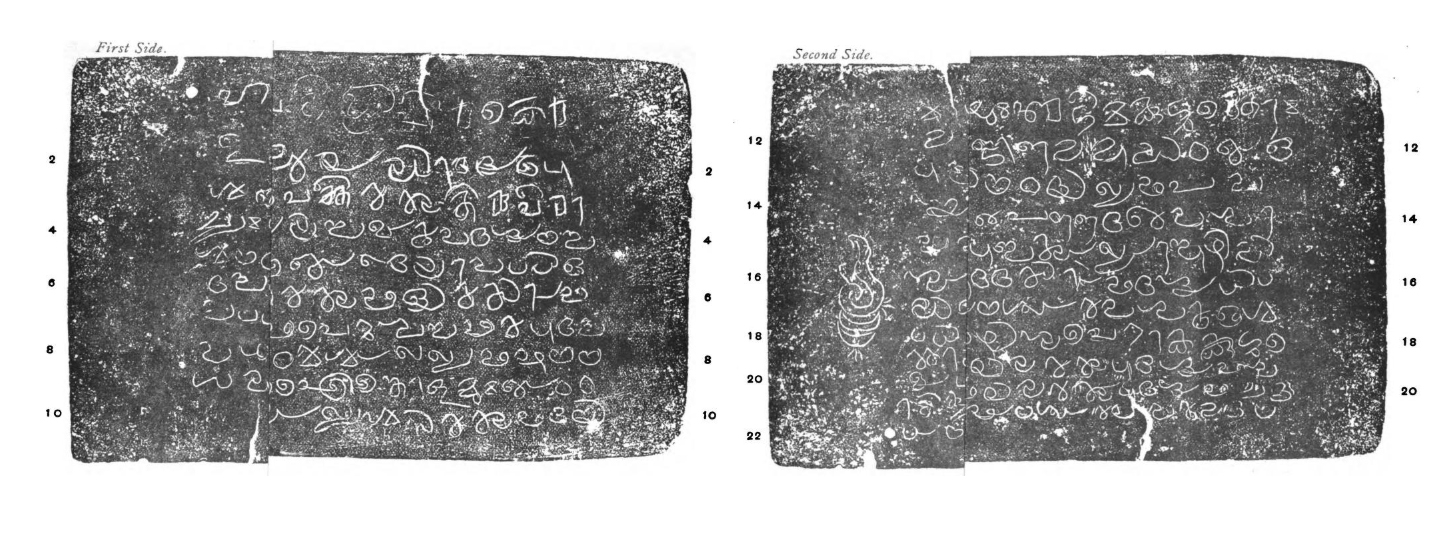
Viraraghava copper plates (Viraraghava)

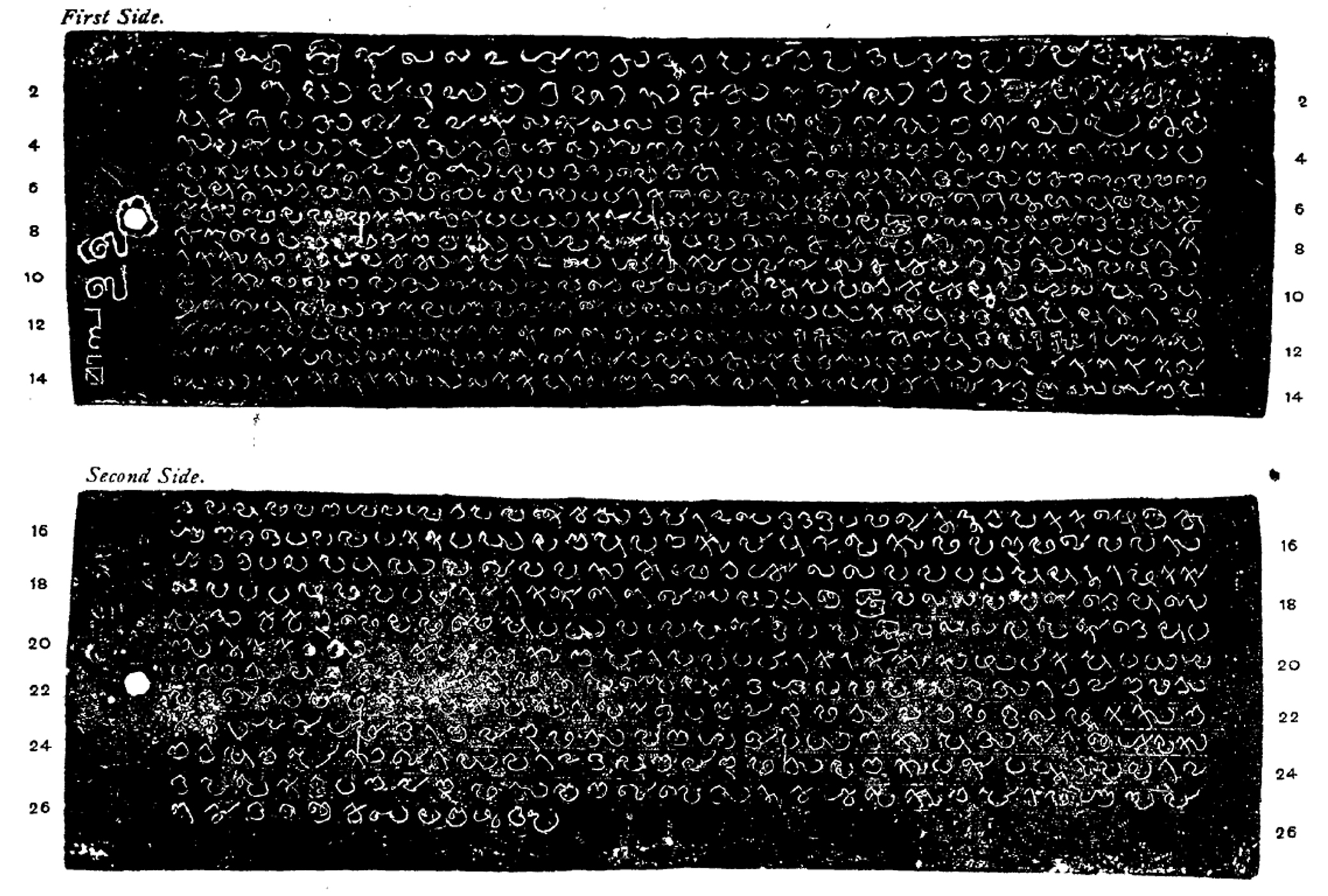
Mampalli copper plate (Srivallabhan Kotha)
