= Kurumathur inscription =

Kurumathur Inscription
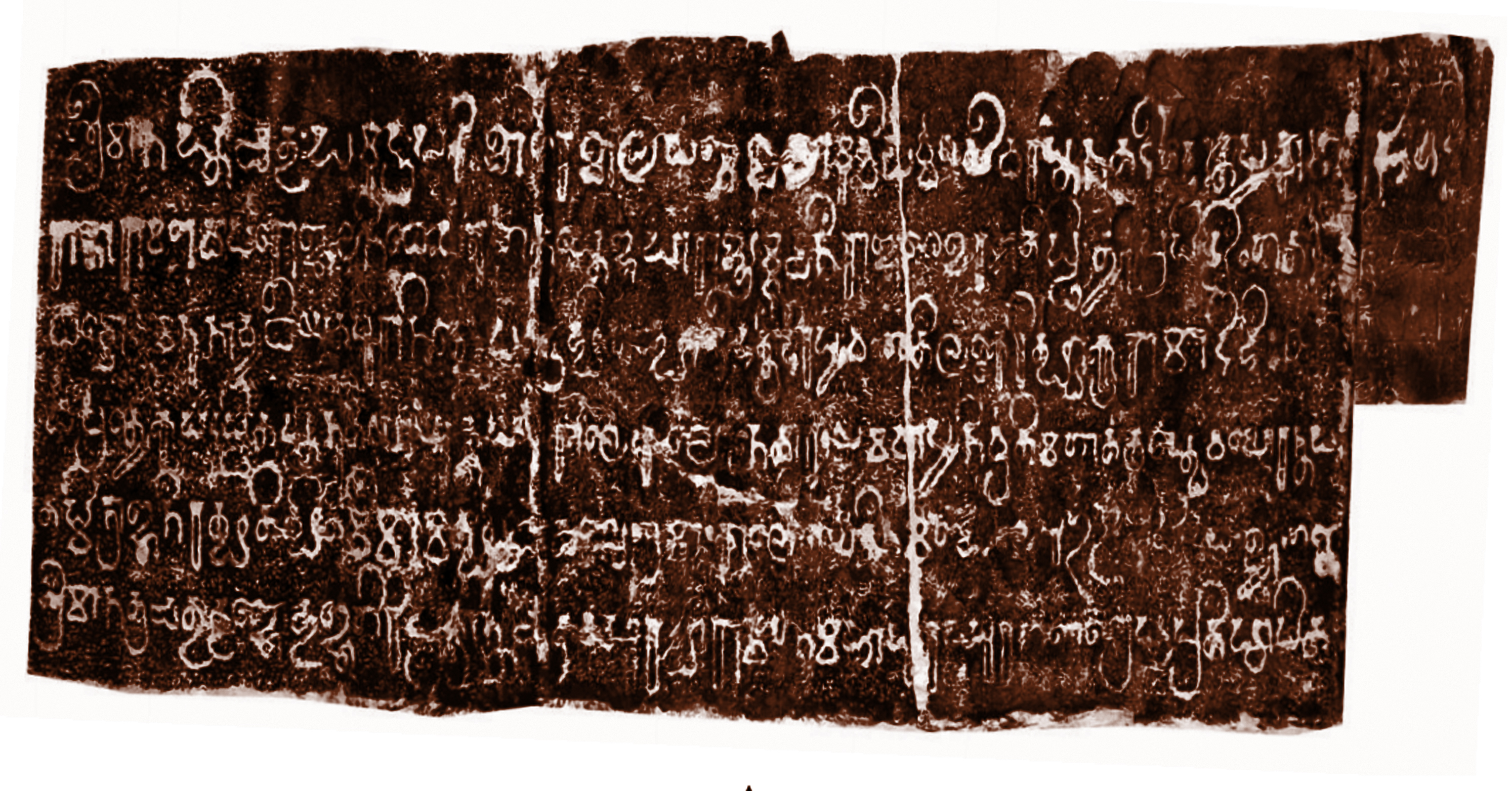
- Kurumathur inscription (9th century AD)
- Material: Granite
- Writing: Sanskrit (Grantha)
- Created: 871 AD; Kerala
- Present location: Kurumathoor Vishnu temple

Kurumathur inscription (871 AD), also romanized as Kurumattur, is a mid-9th century record discovered in Kurumathur, near Areacode in Kerala, south India. The inscription is significant as it pertains to the rule of medieval Chera king Rama Rajasekhara (9th century AD) in north-central Kerala.

Composed in Sanskrit and engraved in the Grantha script, the inscription is carved on a loose, rectangular granite slab measuring 6' 10" x 1' 7". It consists of three stanzas (six lines, each containing 38 letters) in the shardula-vikridita metre. The record was unearthed from the premises of Kurumathoor Vishnu temple at Pookkottuchola, south of Areacode, during renovation work in February, 2011. The discovery was first reported by epigraphist M. R. Raghava Varier. The original Kurumathoor temple structure, which once enshrined the deity, had almost completely deteriorated over time.

The primary purpose of this panegyric appears to have been to commemorate the construction of the side walls of a tank, likely located within the temple premises. Remnants of a large tank can still be seen today in the low-lying fields in front of the temple. In the text, the place name "Thrikkaipatta" is notably sanskritized as "Bhujagiri".

The Kurumathur inscription is one of the rare Sanskrit epigraphs from Kerala and the first known instance of a royal panegyric dedicated to a medieval Chera king of Kerala. It also confirms the inference that the personal/given name of king Rajasekhara was "Rama", and it traces the mythical origins of the dynasty to Iksvaku and lord Rama.

The inscription is particularly important because it contains an exact and verifiable date expressed as a Kali Day chronogram: "netaram yamavapya" (= 1451260 = 24 May 871 AD). This helped historians refine the chronology of the medieval Cheras, placing king Rama Rajasekhara after Sthanu Ravi Kulasekhara.

== Text ==
There hails at the crest of the kingdom his majesty the king who, celebrated as Rajasekhara has acquired fame on account of firm existence, embraces the earth girdled by the moat of the four seas and plump with the firm breasts that are mountains and who like another Rama has crossed the earth.

The dharma enjoined by Manu in the past was protected like a treasure by the auspicious marks on the forehead of his lineage such as Iksvaku and Rama. He, staying firmly in each step and after acquiring [his] leader, attained delight with ease after performing hard penance in the Kali age.

While this king was protecting the earth with varnasramadharma unswerving, the four sides of the great pond that radiating and immersing in its flow the curved mountain (bhujagiri) on the Kali day...

— Translated by M. R. Raghava Varier (2021)
