= Vazhappally copper plate =

Malayalam inscription c. 882 CE

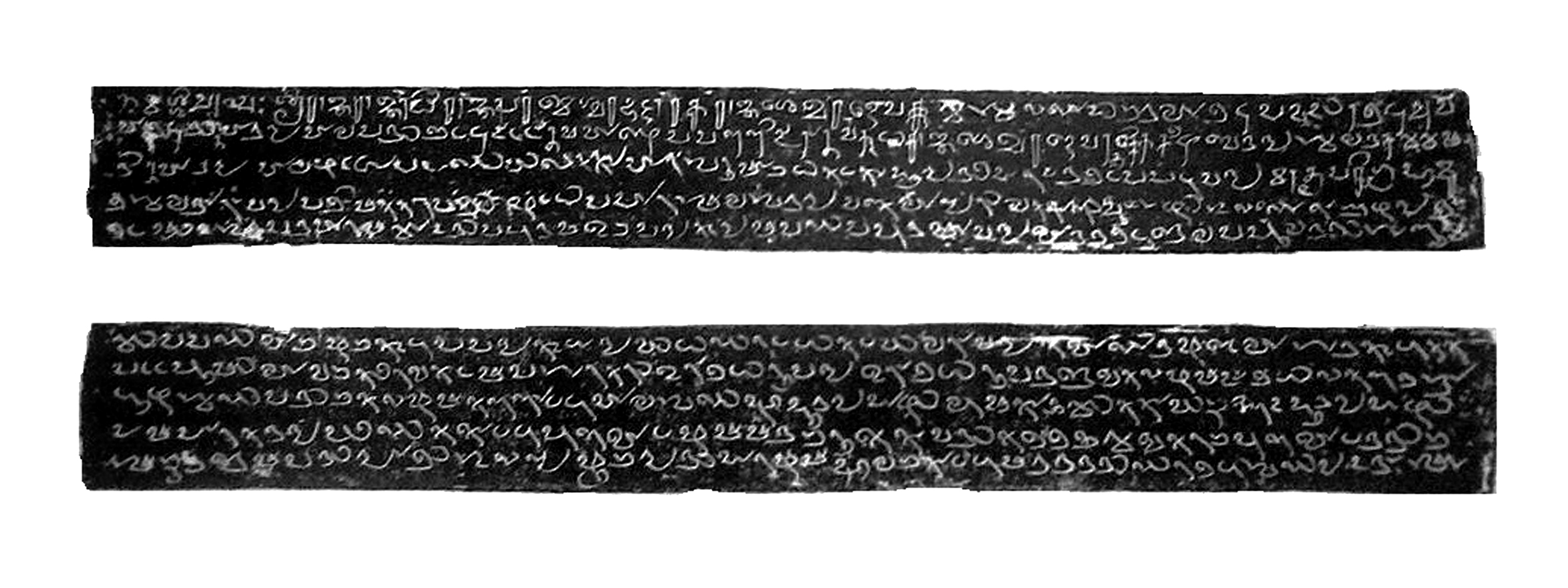
- Vazhappally copper plate
- Material: Copper
- Writing: Old Malayalam
- Created: 9th century AD; Kerala
- Present location: Muvidathu Madham, Thiruvalla

Vazhappally copper plate (c. 750 — 850 AD, c. 882/83 AD ?) is a copper plate inscription in the Malayalam language from Vazhappally, Kottayam, in the state of Kerala, south India. It is dated to the twelfth regnal year of the medieval Chera ruler of Kerala, Rama Rajasekhara (fl. c. 871 AD).

The copper plate documents a temple committee resolution regarding a land grant for daily worship in the temple. The amount of paddy available from the granted land in two seasons is estimated to be over 12,200 kilograms (or around 12 tons).

== Contents ==
The record is engraved on a single copper plate (with five lines on each side) in an early form of Malayalam, using the Vattezhuthu (script) with necessary Grantha characters. The contents of the plate are incomplete. It was discovered by V. Srinivasa Sastri from Thalamana Illam near Changanassery. The plate is currently owned by Muvidathu Madham, Thiruvalla.

The inscription begins with the invocation "Namah Shivaya" ("Respect to Lord Shiva"), instead of the usual medieval Chera invocation "Swasti Sri" ("Hail! Prosperity!") In the record, king Rajasekhara is described with the titles "Sri, Raja Rajadhiraja, Parameswara Bhattaraka, Rajashekhara Deva", and "the Perumal Atikal". The copper plate documents a temple committee resolution by the Thiruvatruvay Pathinettu Nattar and the Urar of Vazhappally, in the presence of king Rajasekhara, regarding a land grant for daily worship in the temple. The inscription also prescribes fines for those who obstruct daily worship in the temple. Notably, it mentions a coin called the "dinara".

The Vattezhuthu characters in the Vazhappally copper plate are noted for their similarity to those in the Madras Museum Plates of Jatila Varman Parantaka Pandya. The Grantha characters in the plate exhibit a later form compared to the Kasakudi and other early Pallava grants. The plate also resembles Quilon Syrian copper plates (mid-9th century AD), another early Chera record, in both script and language. Medieval Chera king Rajasekhara is commonly identified by scholars with Cheraman Perumal Nayanar, the venerated Shaiva (Nayanar) poet-musician.

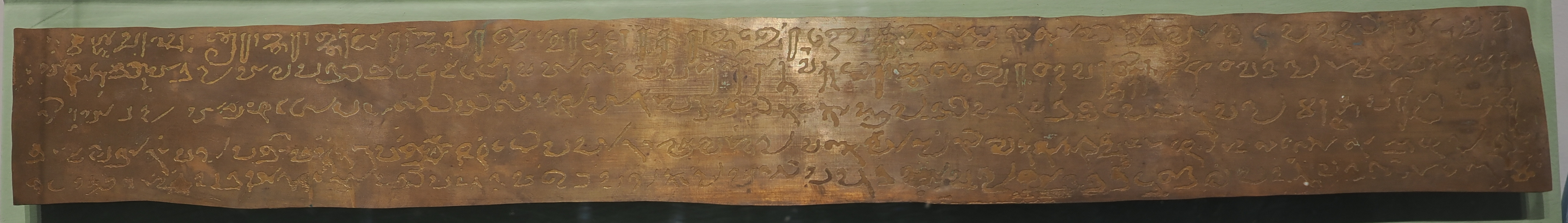
Vazhappally copper plate (plate 1, side 1) replica

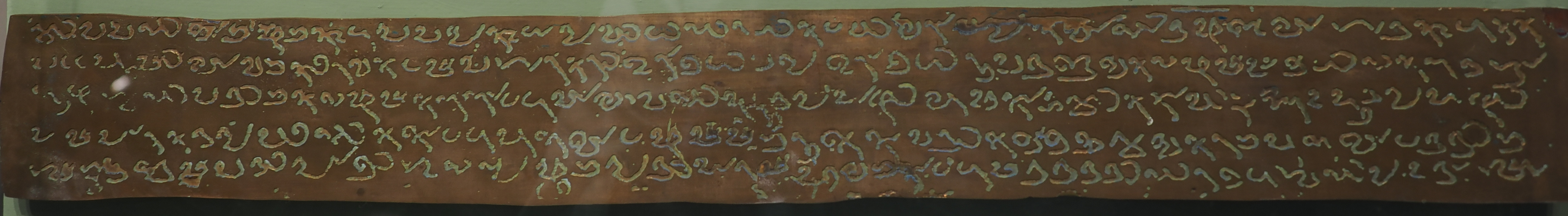
Vazhappally copper plate (plate 1, side 2) replica

== Translation ==
"Adoration to Siva. The year twelve (of the reign) of the prosperous king Rajashekharadeva (who bore the birudas) Rajadhiraja, Parameswara and Bhattaraka (was current).

"(The following was) the arrangement made by the men of the eighteen nadus [sic] belonging to Tiruvarruvay and the townsmen of Valaippalli who met under the presidency of (literally at the feet of) Rajashekharadeva.

"Those who stop the perpetually endowed bali ceremony (muttappali) in the Tiruvarruvay (Temple) should pay to the king (or the god) a fine of one hundred dinaras; and (are to be considered) as having taken their (own) mothers for their wives. Among the servants, those who stop (the bali owing to their own negligence) should each pay a fine paddy as measured by and made up to four nalis for each occasion (the bali is so stopped).

Of this the paddy due as padavaram should go the capital (set apart) for the santi and the (remaining) nine parts for the bali. (And) this fine should be remitted before the midday bali of the Pushyanakshtra in the month of Tai. If not so paid, they become liable to pay twice the amount.

"The following are the lands given to the (god in the shrine named?) Kailasa: the plot (kari, belonging to) Kirankadambanar, which yields one year 20 and another year 25 kalams (of paddy); Mandilakkalam together with Ulaseli yielding 10 kalams; Kallattuvay-veli (or a plot of land one veli in extend in Kallattuvay), yielding 500 nalis; from Kanjikka, 500 nazhis; the gardone (puraiyidam named) Pilikkodu and garden belonging to Kannan Sankaran who hold the position of a kavadi (accountant), which adjoins it (Pilikkodu puraiyidam), both situated in Uragam and yielding 150 tuni of paddy and three dinaras; two velis in the land (marram) in Ayyankadu, Damodaran's...

— T. A. Gopinatha Rao (ed.), Travancore Archaeological Series. 2 (2). Government of Travancore

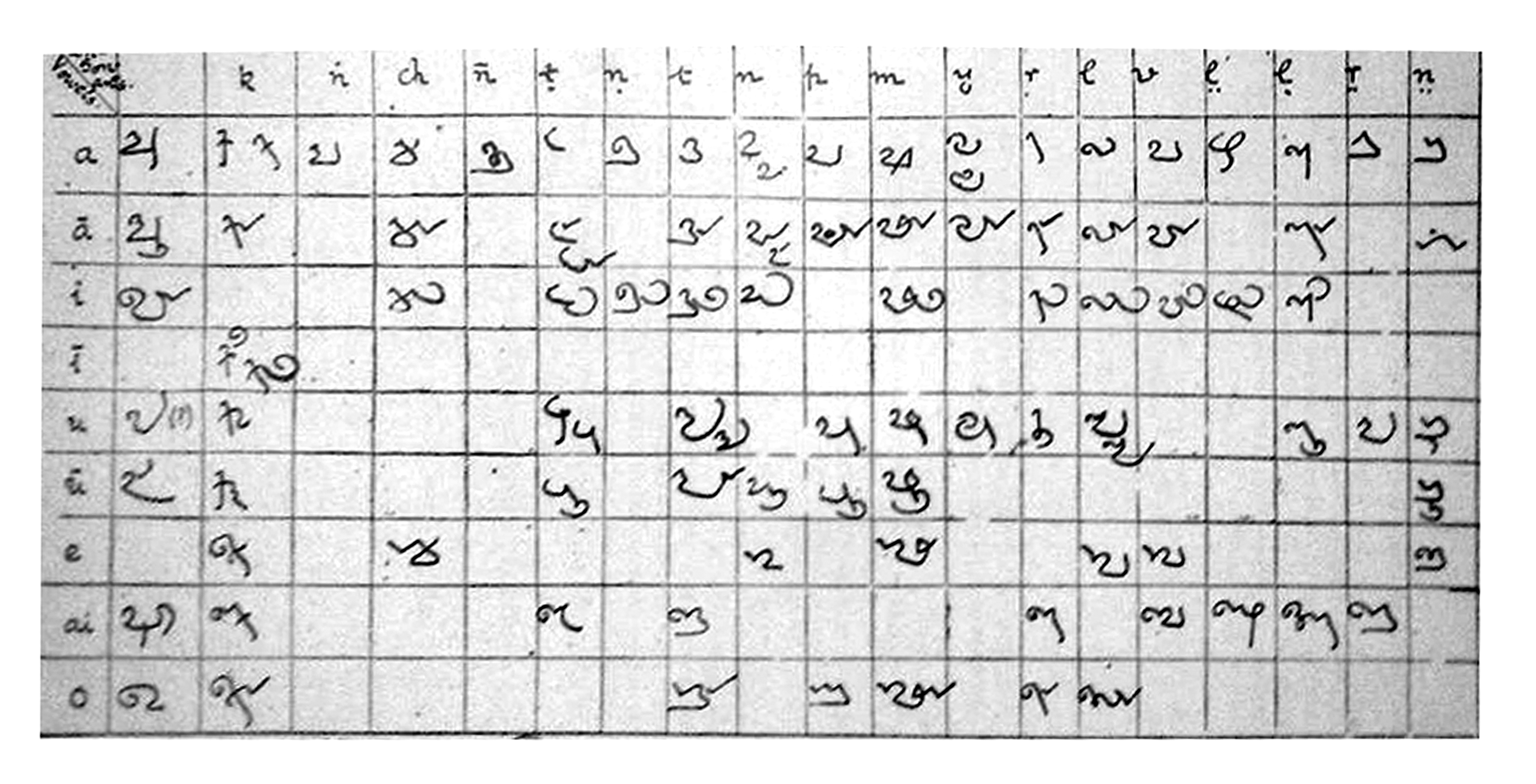
Vattezhuthu characters (Vazhappally copper plate)
