= Cheraman Perumal Nayanar =

Hindu poet and religious teacher

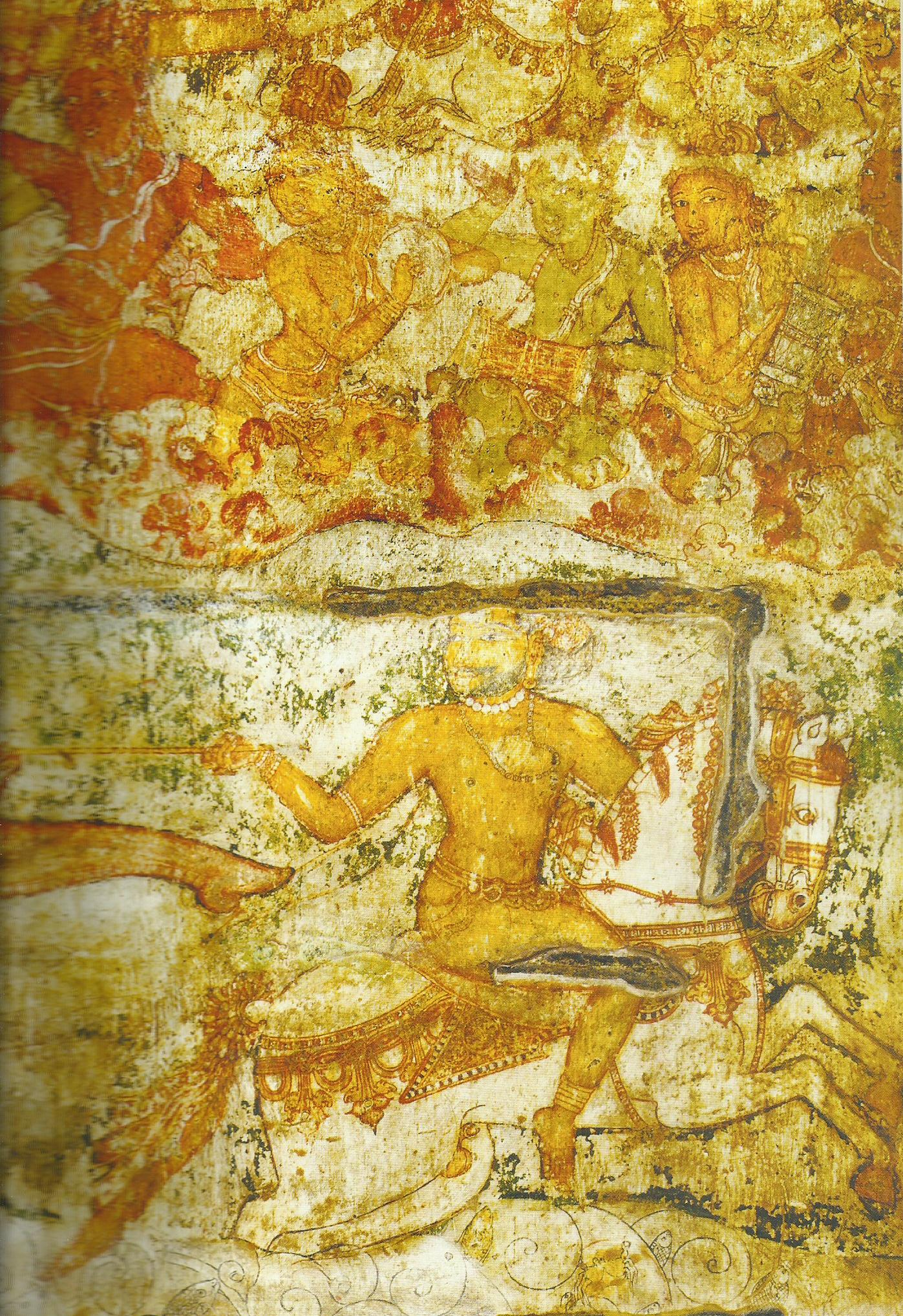
- Depiction of Cherman Perumal Nayanar in an oil painting inspired from wall painting at the Brihadisvara Temple, Thanjavur

Personal life
- Notable works: Ponvannattandadi; Thiruvarur Mummanikkovai; Adiyula or Thirukkailayajnana Ula

Religious life
- Religion: Hinduism (Shaivism-Bhakti)
- Temple: Thiruvanchikulam Shiva Temple

Cheraman Perumal Nayanar (Malayalam: ചേരമാൻ പെരുമാൾ നായനാർ; Tamil: சேரமான் பெருமாள் நாயனார்; literally meaning "Chera king the Nayanar") was a bhakti poet-musician and religious teacher of the Tamil Shaiva tradition in medieval south India, and is counted among the sixty-three revered nayanars.

The Cheraman Perumal's companionship with Sundarar, also known as Sundara Moorthy Nayanar, one of the "Three Nayanars", is celebrated in the bhakti tradition. The legend of the Cheraman Perumal is recounted in the hagiographic work "Periyapuranam", composed in the mid-12th century AD by Chekkizhar, a courtier of Chola ruler Kulottunga II. This collection draws upon an earlier compilation by Nambiyandar Nambi (10th-11th centuries AD). The Thiruvanchikulam Shiva Temple in Kodungallur, on the Malabar Coast, is closely associated with both the Perumal and Sundarar Moorthy Nayanar.

The Cheraman Perumal is credited with composing several devotional works, including the "Ponvannattandadi", a collection of hymns in praise of the Lord of Chidambaram; the "Thiruvarur Mummanikkovai", dedicated to the deity of Thiruvarur; and the "Adiyula"—also known as the "Thirukkailayajnana Ula"—the first of the ulas, in honor of Lord Shiva. Historians tentatively identify the saint with Rama Rajasekhara, the 9th century ruler of the medieval Chera state of Kerala.

== The legend of the Cheraman Perumal ==
The legend of Cheraman Perumal Nayanar and Sundarar appears to have originated in pre-Chola times. Their extant forms took shape only later, at the courts of the Chola kings, around the late 10th to 12th century AD.

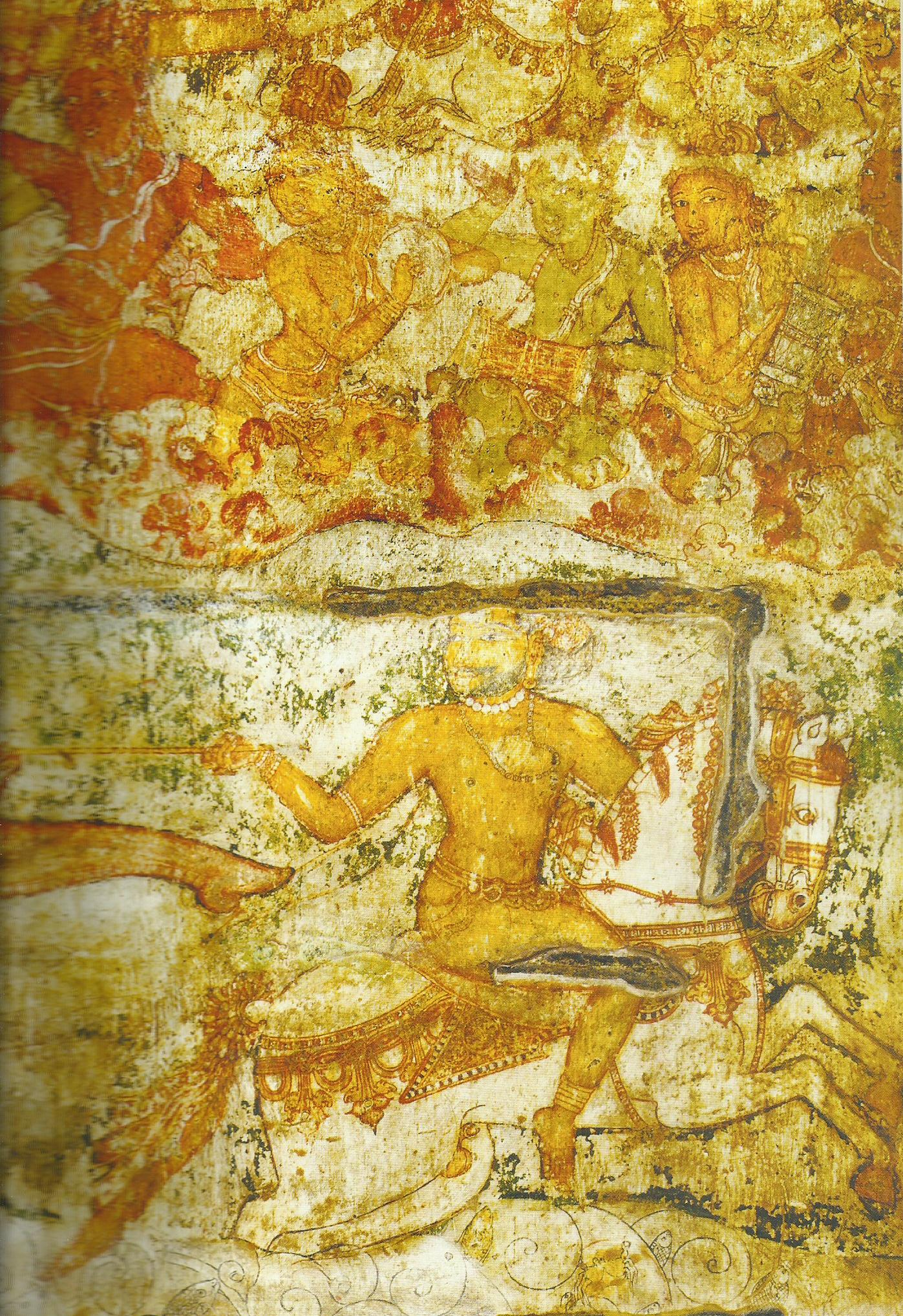
Depiction of "Cherman Perumal Nayanar" in Brihadisvara Temple, Thanjavur (11th century fresco)

The Cheraman Perumal (a title, meaning "the Chera ruler"), according to tradition, was born into the royal family of "Malai-nadu", whose capital was "Kodunkolur or Makotai by the Ocean". When the reigning king, "Chenkor Poraiyan", abdicated the throne, his ministers persuaded the young Cheraman — also known as "Perumakkotaiyar" or "Kalarirrarivar" ("the One who knows [all] Languages") — to assume the responsibilities of the kingdom. At the time, the prince was meditating at the Tiruvanchaikkalam Temple and had to be persuaded by the ministers, with great difficulty, to accept the crown.

In due course, the Cheraman Perumal learned of the lyricist Sundarar through a vision of the Nataraja of Chidambaram. Sundarar, a devoted follower of Lord Shiva, was singing at the Chidambaram Temple, and the king wished to meet him and pay homage. Accordingly, he left his capital and, after travelling through the Kongu country, eventually arrived at Chidambaram. He then continued to Tiruvarur, where he met Sundarar in person.

Over time, the two became close companions and embarked on a long pilgrimage across south India. Their journey included visits to Kirvelur, Nagaikkaronam, Tirumaraikkadu, Palanam, Agastyanpalli, Kulagar-Kodikkoyil, Tirupattur, Madurai, Tiruppuvanam, Tiruvappanur, Tiruvedagam, Tirupparangunram, Kurralam, Kurumbala, Tirunelveli, Ramesvaram, Tiruchchuliyal, Kanapper, Tiruppunavayil, Patalesvaram, Tirukkandiyur, and Tiruvaiyyaru.

Years later, Sundarar visited his fellow devotee, the Cheraman Perumal, in Kodunkolur and remained in the city as a royal guest for some time. One day, messengers from Lord Shiva arrived at Tiruvanchaikkalam to inform Sundarar that it was time for him to return to Mount Kailasa. Sundarar ascended to Kailasa on a white elephant, with the Cheraman Perumal following him on horseback.
