= Rama Rajasekhara =

9th century Chera ruler of Kerala

- Raja Rajadhiraja
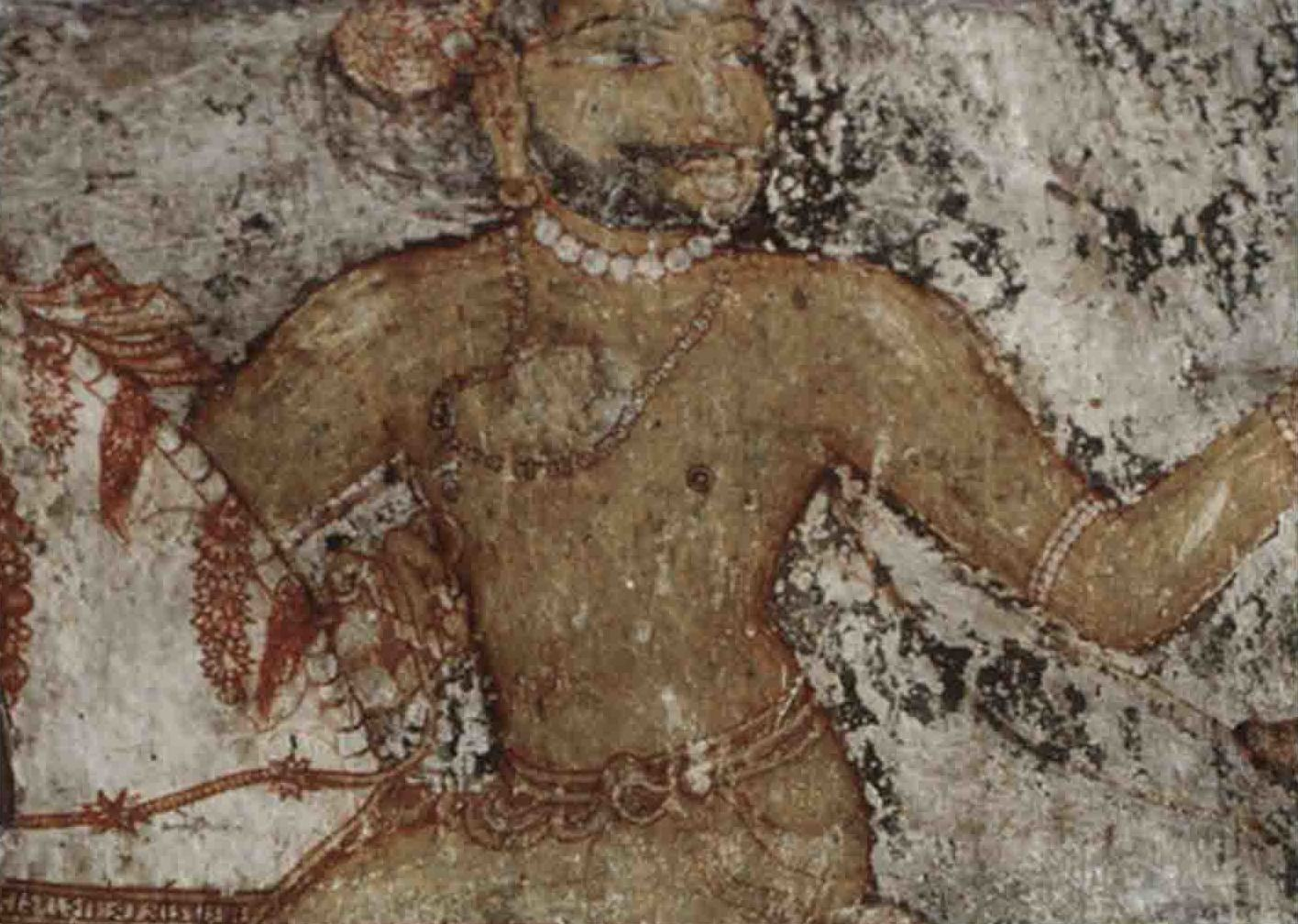
- Depiction of Cherman Perumal Nayanar, who is generally identified with Rajasekhara, in the Brihadisvara Temple

Ruler of the Chera Kingdom
- Reign: 870/71–c. 883/84 AD ?
- Predecessor: Sthanu Ravi Kulasekhara
- Successor: Vijayaraga
- Rama Rajashekhara
Regnal name
- Rajasekhara
- House: Chera (medieval Kerala)
- Religion: Hinduism (Shaiva)

Rama Rajasekhara (fl. c. 870/71 – c. 883/84 AD?) was a medieval Chera ruler of Kerala, south India. Historians generally identify Rajasekhara with Cheraman Perumal Nayanar, the venerated Shaiva (Nayanar) poet-musician of the Bhakti tradition.

Rajasekhara is believed to have succeeded Sthanu Ravi Kulasekhara around 870/71 AD. "Tripuradahana" and "Saurikathodaya", Yamaka poems by Vasubhatta, were composed under the patronage of Rajasekhara. Two temple records, from Kurumattur, Areacode and Thiruvatruvay, Vazhappally, mention king Rajasekhara. The former contains the only available royal panegyric of a Chera Perumal ruler of medieval Kerala and notably links the dynasty to the mythical Solar Race.

Rajasehara probably abdicated the throne toward the end of his reign and became a Shaiva nayanar known as Cheraman Perumal Nayanar. He was likely succeeded by Vijayaraga (fl. c. 883/84-c.895 AD).

== Sources ==
=== In relation to Shankara ===
The "Shankaravijaya" by Vidyaranya mentions a Kerala king named "Rajasekhara" as a contemporary of the renowned Hindu philosopher Shankara. Similarly, the "Shivanandalahari," attributed to Shankara, indirectly mentions the Kerala ruler as "Rajasekhara."

=== Laghubhaskariyavyakhya ===
The Laghubhaskariyavyakhya, a mathematical commentary composed in the court of king Sthanu Ravi Kulasekhara in c. 869/70 AD, mentions a Chera ruler named "Ramadeva", who "marched out to fight the enemies on receiving information from the spies". Some scholars identify this "Ramadeva" with Rama Rajasekhara. Ramadeva is described as the king ("Raja") and a member of the Solar Dynasty ("ravi-kula-pati") in Chapter IIII of the Laghubhaskariyavyakhya.

=== Patron of Vasubhatta ===
Vasubhatta, the celebrated Yamaka poet of medieval Kerala, names his patron king as "Rama" in his works "Tripuradahana" and "Saurikathodaya".

The poem "Tripuradahana" also refers to Rama as "Rajasekhara":

There ruled a king who was bowed to by poets, the sight of whose army scattered his enemy kings, who was as steady in punishing the wicked as ready in succouring the righteous, whose conduct was above calumny, who was extolled as the foremost of kings (rajasekhara = Siva) in being wealthy (bhutidhara = a smearer of ashes) in having proboscis-like arms (vyala-pati-sphurat-karam = serpent entwined arms) and in bestowing wealth upon the supplicants at his feet, who was considered as an incarnation of Rama himself in the sameness of his name, with the hero of the Ramayana and in (the identity of purpose) raksopayam (protection of his subjects: danger to Raksasas). In the reign of this king who was pleasing the eyes of his subjects...

Another poem by Vasubhatta, the "Yudhisthiravijaya", states that "Kulasekhara" was the regnal title of his patron king. In the Keralolpatti legends on the origin of Kerala, the first Chera ruler (the Cheraman Perumal) is described as a contemporary of Vasubhatta, who is elsewhere in the same work portrayed as a courtier of king Kulasekhara and a disciple of a certain Mahabharata Bhatta.

Two later commentaries on Yudhisthiravijaya — "Vijayadarsika" by Acyuta and "Ratnapradipika" by Sivadasa — argue that "Rama" was the personal name of the king whose regnal title was "Kulasekhara". Modern scholars generally consider this interpretation to be the result of confusion on the part of these commentators, who lived long after the Chera rulers and may have conflated Sthanu Ravi Kulasekhara with Rama Rajasekhara. Some scholars also identify king Rama Kulasekhara, a later Chera ruler of Kerala, as the patron of poet Vasubhatta, thereby placing Vasubhatta in 11th-12 centuries AD. However, this view is generally regarded as unacceptable for several reasons.

Rajasekhara is also tentatively identified with king referred to as "Co-qua-rangon" in the extant text of the Thomas of Cana copper plates.

== Epigraphic records ==
Date	Regnal Year	Language and Script	Location	Contents	
Date	Regnal Year	Language and Script	Location	Nature	Notes
871 AD	N/A	Grantha (Sanskrit)	Kurumattur Vishnu temple, Areacode.; Loose, granite slab.	Royal panegyric	Date is given as a Kali Day chronogram (871 AD).; Rajasekhara belonged to the illustrious Solar dynasty (of Ikshvaku and lord Rama).; Helped historians refine the chronology of the medieval Cheras, placing king Rama Rajasekhara after Sthanu Ravi Kulasekhara.
750 - 850 AD	12	Vattezhuthu with Grantha/Southern Pallava Grantha characters (early Malayalam)	Thiruvatruvay, Vazhappally.; The plate is owned by Muvidathu Madham, Thiruvalla.; The plate is said to belonged to and discovered from Talamana Illam or madham, near the eastern tower of Vazhappally Temple, Changanassery.	Temple committee resolution	Records a temple committee resolution presided over by king Rajasekhara. The resolution describes Thiruvatruvay Pathinettu Nattar, Vazhappally Urar and the king deciding on land grant for muttappali (daily offering in temple).; The inscription begins with the invocation "Namah Shivaya" ("Respect to Shiva") in place of the usual "Swasti Sri" ("Hail! Prosperity!").; The record also mentions a coin called "dinara".

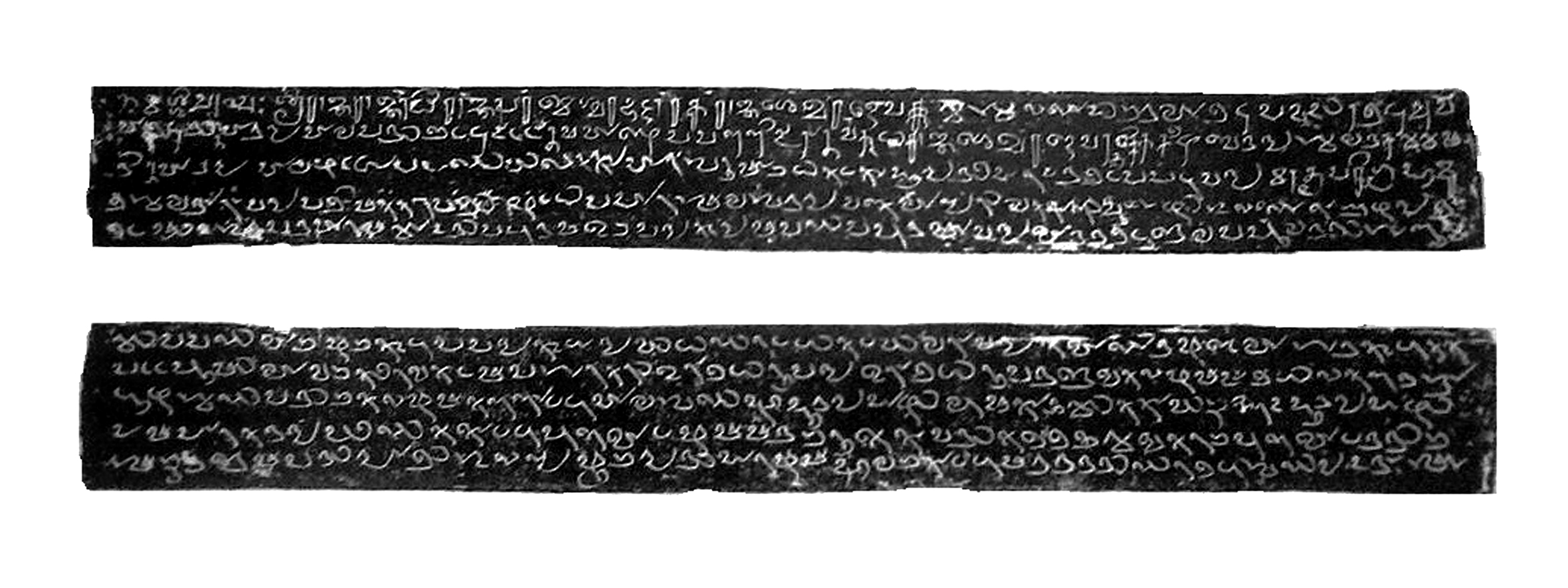
Vazhappalli copper plate

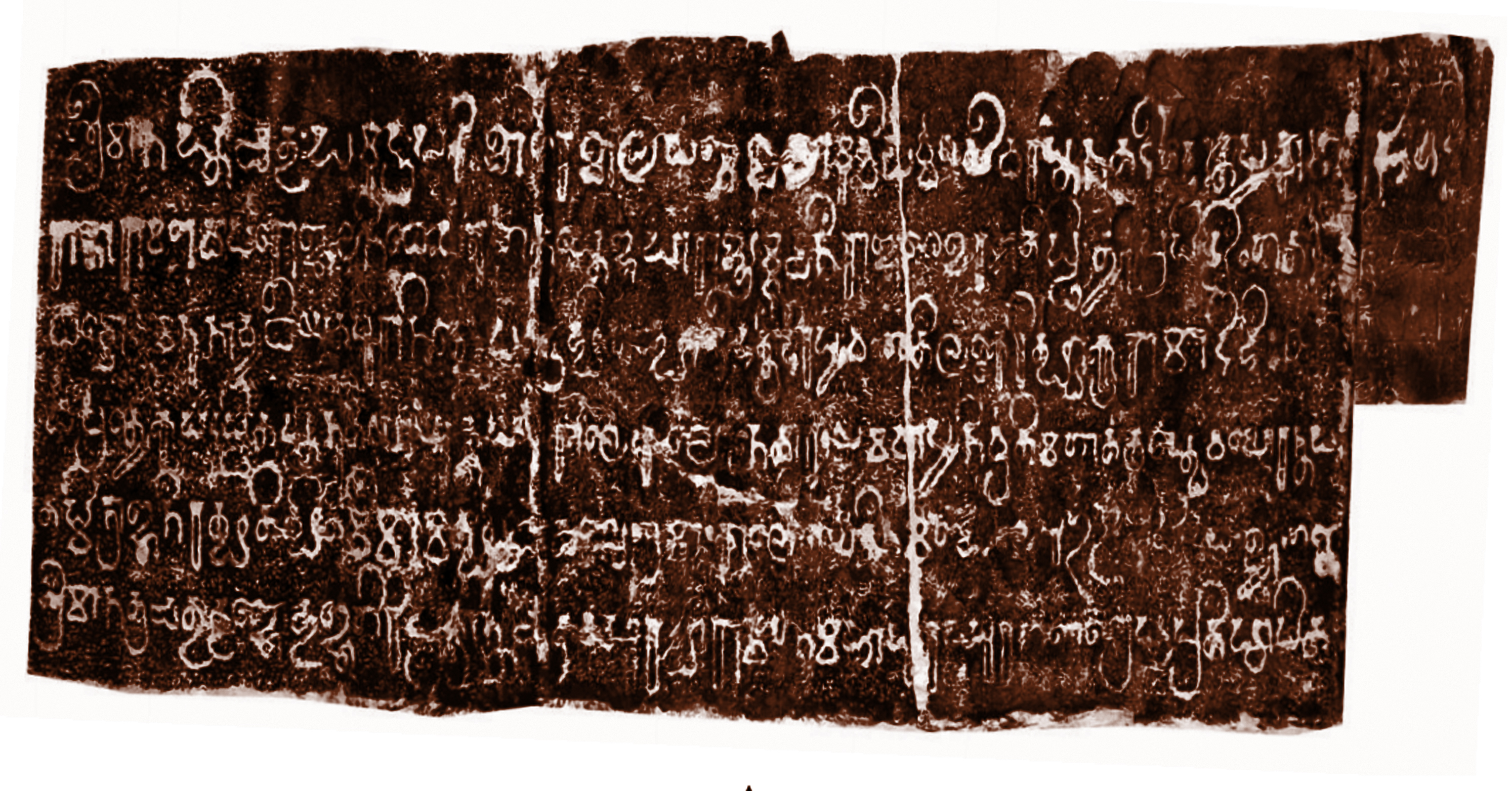
Kurumattur inscription
