= Women in Malayalam literature =

Women's writing in Malayalam is a category of Malayalam literature that runs counter to the dominant public sphere in Kerala. It comprises women's fiction, poetry, and short stories and has a long tradition in Malayalam literature. The pennezhuthu category is its most decisive and controversial form, changing the historiography of women's writing in India and the images of certain writers and writing trends. Malayalam literature's most significant female authors are K. Saraswathi Amma, Rajalakshmi, Lalithambika Antharjanam and Madhavikutty (Kamala Das), best known for their narrating of "woman's space". Women's literary writing in Malayala is part of a tradition of resistance and contributes to the women's cause through the merging of the public and the private spheres. Women's writing emerged in India as a new subject of research and critical studies in the 1980s as a result of the feminist movement and as a consequence of growing interest in feminist historiography.

Two terms are used in relation to the subject: women-writing and women's writing. Women's writing refers simply to writings by women. Women-writing usually denotes the phenomenon of women's writing and its emergence as a new discipline within women's studies.

Women from hegemonic communities, who had access to education, started writing by the second half of the 19th century. They wrote in magazines from the early 20th century. Susie Tharu and Lalitha identify the period as "a high point of women's journalism and in almost every region, women edited journals for women and many hundreds of women wrote in them." There were several magazines including Keraliya Suguna Bodhini (1886), Sharada (1904), Lakshmibai (1905), Mahilaratnam (1916), Mahila (1921), Sahodari (1925), Mahilamandiram (1927), Malayalamasika (1931), and Stree (1933) during this period, and journals for women from various communities. The journals carried articles written by women on issues such as health, education, child rearing, family, etc. Notable figures from this era, such as K. Chinnamma (1882–1930), B. Kalyani Amma (1884–1959), Mary Poonen Lukose (1886–1976), Muthukulam Parvathi Amma (1904–1971), Anna Chandy (1905–1996), M. Haleema Beevi (1918–2000), B. Bhagirathy Amma, B. Anandavalli Amma, Tharavath Ammalu Amma, and K. Kalyanikutty Amma (1920–1996) were writers and activists, simultaneously holding various jobs. The main aim of the magazines were to educate Malayali women in the hegemonic notions of womanhood that was being constructed throughout India in that period. The writers were also negotiating modernity and the woman's question through their writings. The image that was being constructed across communities and identities consisted largely of an ideal middle-class woman who was educated, homely and suitable for a modern educated man. There were also women who wrote about a radical womanhood that was different from the existing ideals of womanhood. The period saw the emergence of a few magazines edited and run by lower-caste women - Araya Stree Jana Masika, Sahodari, Sanghamitra, Sevini, and so on.

Jancy James notes that the shift from verse to prose in women's expression is related to women's education. Women writers such as Lalithambika Antharjanam (1909−1985) and K. Saraswathi Amma (1919−1975) used prose efficiently and frequently, although there were writers such as Mary John Thottam or Sister Mary Benigna (1901−1985), Koothattukulam Mary John (1905−?), Kadathanattu Madhavi Amma (1909−1999), and Balamani Amma (1909−2004) who wrote in verse. For most of these women writers, education functioned more as an indirect means of access to the public sphere than as a means merely to read and write. Unlike earlier women-writers who wrote in Sanskrit, women who had access to modern education expressed their own experiences in their own languages.
