= List of Benemerenti medal recipients =

The Benemerenti medal is an honour awarded by the Pope to members of the clergy and laity for service to the Catholic Church.

This list is not complete. It only contains a selection of recipients.

== Awarded by Pope Leo XIII ==
- William Turner, 1893: for a commentary on Thomas Aquinas' De Anima.

== Awarded by Pope Benedict XV ==
- Hilda Beatrice Currie, 1939.

== Awarded by Pope Pius XII ==
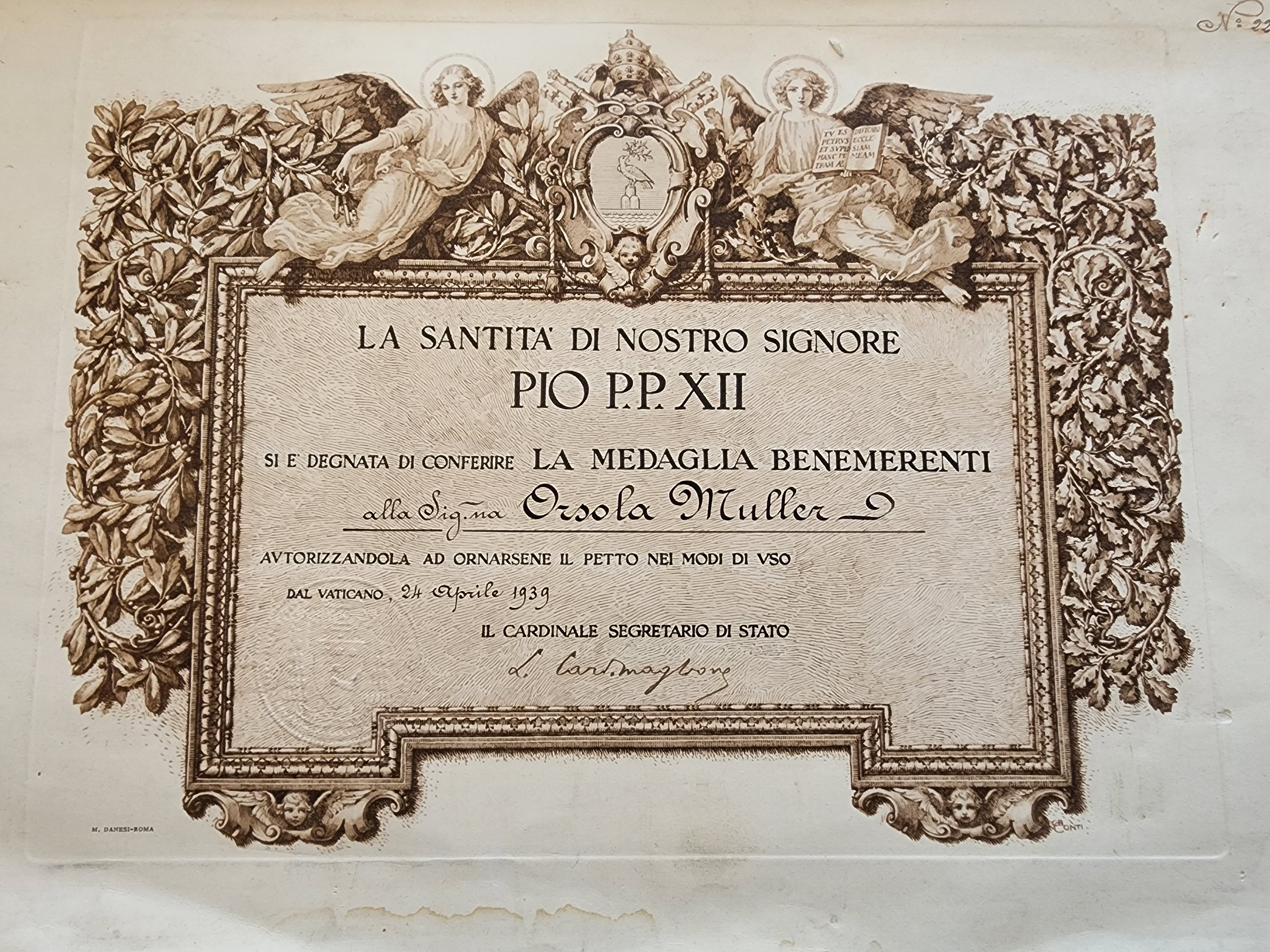
Picture of La Medaglia Benemerenti awarded to Ursula Muller, 1939

- Ursula Muller, April 24, 1939
- Princess Ghislaine of Monaco, 1948.
- Maria Augusta von Trapp, 1949.
- Bertha Quinn, 1949

== Awarded by Pope John XXIII ==
- Edward Flannery, 1977.
- Percival William Pine, 1962. Awarded for services to the church in connection with fundraising for the building project of St Joseph's Church, Gerrards Cross, Buckinghamshire, England.
- Edward Roman, 1962. Awarded for service to the church at St. Paul's Mission at Marty, South Dakota, US.
- Seraphina Fontes, 1962. Awarded for her tireless service to Tuberculosis patients at a sanatorium in Moodbidri, India.
- Thomas Pender, 1962. Awarded in 1962, in recognition of his long and devoted services to the Church over forty years as clerk and sacristan of St Michael's Church, Kilmihil, Co. Clare, Ireland. The award was presented to him by Most Rev. Joseph Rodgers D.D May 10, 1962.

== Awarded by Pope Paul VI ==
- Salvador Pinto in 1964 From a Pinto family of Bondel, Mangalore, India. Unique figure in the Mangalorean community - in that he was a chauffeur to the Bishops of Mangalore from 1922 when a new car was presented to the Italian Jesuit Bishop Paul Perini till his retirement in 1966 at the age of 75. In this period of 44 years, he was chauffeur as follows: 1922 - 27 Bishop Paul Perini; 1927 - 30 Bishop Valerian D'Souza; 1930 - 55 Bishop Victor Fernandes; 1955 - 58 Bishop Basil Peres; 1958 - 64 Bishop Raymond D'Mello; 1964 - 66 Bishop Basil D'Souza. He was awarded the BENE MERENTI for his many years of service to the Diocese of Mangalore (citation: Distinguished Mangalorean Catholics (1800-2000) A Historico_Biographical survey of the Mangalorean Catholic Community by (c) Michael Lobo 2000)
- Agnes Mary Littleboy from Holy Cross Parish, Parsons Green, Fulham. Awarded for her lifetime service to the Church in 1964 especially in her capacity of Lady Chairman of the parish 'Care Committee'. She acted as Godmother to almost 400 children during her time in this post and sent them cards on the anniversary of their christening until infirmity took its toll.

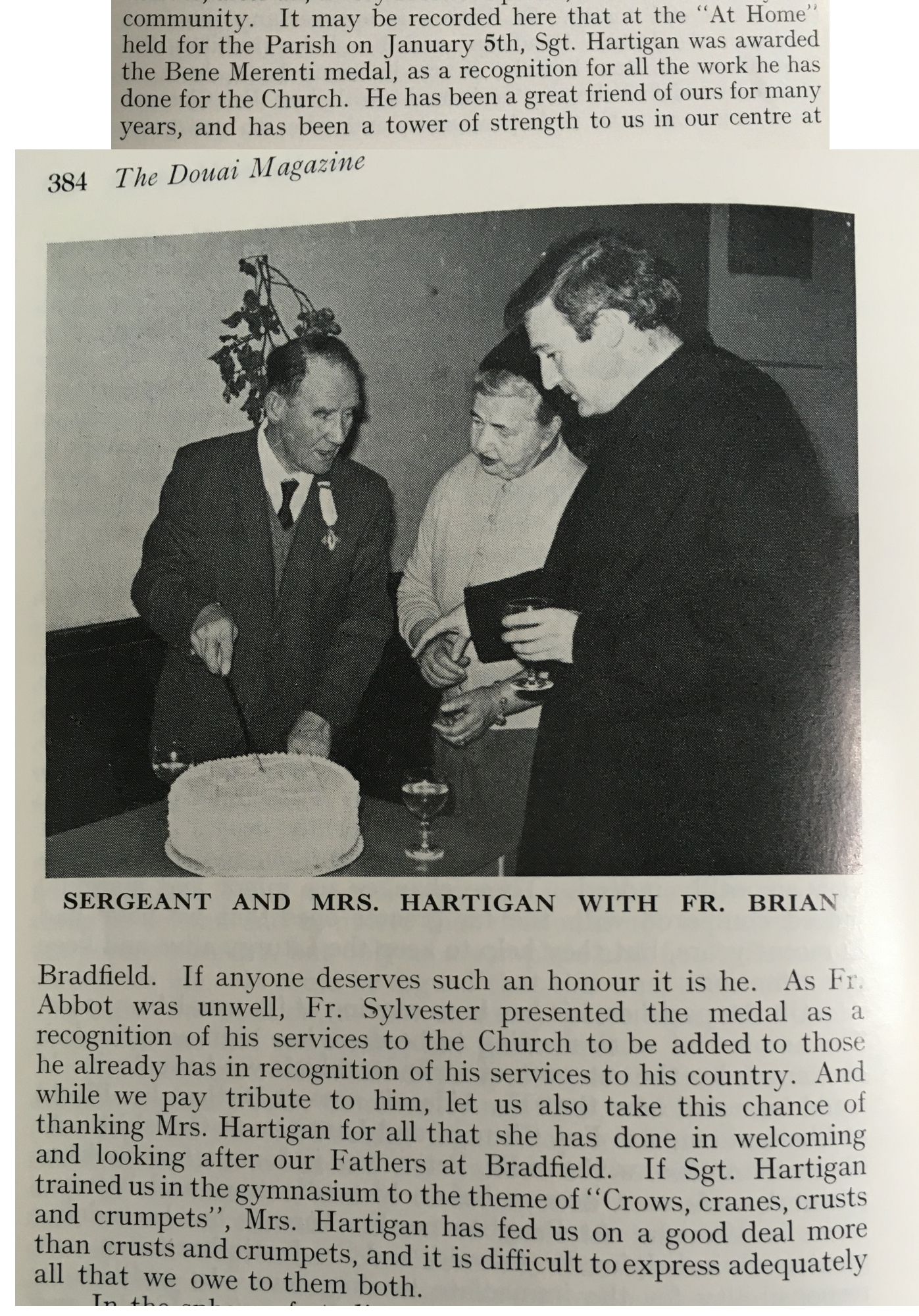
Sgt and Mrs Hartigan: medal presentation

- Robert Edward Hartigan 1896-1976 awarded the Benemerenti medal in 1969 for services to the Catholic Church in Bradfield, Berkshire working with the Brothers from Douai Abbey, Bucklebury. Extract from Douai Magazine 1970: "It may be recorded here that at the "At Home" held for the Parish on January 5, Sgt. Hartigan was awarded the Bene Merenti medal, as a recognition for all the work he has done for the Church. He has been a great friend of ours for many years, and has been a tower of strength to us in our centre at Bradfield. If anyone deserves such an honour it is he. As Fr. Abbot was unwell, Fr. Sylvester presented the medal as a recognition of his services to the Church to be added to those he already has in recognition of his services to his country. And while we pay tribute to him, let us also take this chance of thanking Mrs. Hartigan for all that she has done in welcoming and looking after our Fathers at Bradfield. If Sgt. Hartigan trained us in the gymnasium to the theme of "Crows, cranes, crusts and crumpets", Mrs. Hartigan has fed us on a good deal more than crusts and crumpets, and it is difficult to express adequately all that we owe to them both."
- Mary John Thottam, 1971 for religious poems
- Harry Carrigan, 1972. Of High Firs Road Southampton, presented on 18 December 1972. Awarded for lay service to the Church. Carrigan was Master of Ceremonies at St Colman's Church, Thornhill. He was an altar server and a silver medalist of the Guild of St. Stephen.
- Herbert Eugene Longenecker, 1977.
- Lester A. Wombacher, 1970. A founding member of Saint Dominic Parish, Eagle Rock, CA. Presented 27 April 1970 for lay service to the church, and the Dominican Order. Also, served the Congregation of the Passion of Jesus Christ at the Mater Dolorosa Monastery and Retreat House in Sierra Madre, CA.
- Filipina Amosa Sio. Gold medal awarded for work for the church in Samoa
- Joseph Lee b 1915 d 1986 in Gorton, Manchester. Joseph was an altar boy and altar server at St Francis monastery in Gorton, Manchester for 60 years. He was awarded the Benemerenti medal at a special mass at the monastery at noon on October 4, 1972
- William Kelly, born in 1888 in Spotfield, Bekan. At the age of sixteen in 1904, he became the Parish Sacristan in Bekan Church at the request of the then parish priest, Fr Bernard Freeley. William was sacristan for over 66 years and served under five parish priests, four Archbishops and six popes. He was awarded the Benemerenti medal in 1970.
- Edward Burns of St Mary of Furness parish, Ulverston, was awarded the Benemerenti medal at Midnight Mass on 25 December 1974, for lifelong service to the Church. The presentation was made by parish priest Father John Moxham.

== Awarded by Pope John Paul II ==
Date	Person	Notes
1978	Rita Carey	Rita Carey (S.R.N., S.C.M. N.D.N. Cert.) and four other parishioners (names unknown) were presented with Benemerenti Medals on May 29, 1978. Rita was awarded for her work in setting up a new parish in the Westminster Diocese, London, England. The new church was set up in 1975 and was named after St. Margaret Clitherow.
1979	Paddy Crosbie	
1982	S. L. Larius	
1985	Marietta Dias	She is the former chairwoman and co-founder of the Migrant Workers Protection Society. She has been honoured by the US State Department for her volunteer work on the island nation of Bahrain in the Middle East, receiving the Hero Acting to End Modern-Day Slavery Award in 2008.
1989	Michael Igoe	Benemerenti Medals were conferred on Una Murphy and Michael Igoe by His Holiness Pope John Paul II for Service to Irish Franciscan Pilgrimage to Lourdes. Una was the matron in charge of the pilgrimage and held the role of Matron of the National Maternity Hospital in Dublin; Michael was the chief Brancardier (Lourdes Pilgrimage Workers Honoured, Irish Catholic, June 22, 1989). Their medals were presented at a Mass at Broc House, 4 Nutley Lane, Donnybrook Dublin 4 on Friday 16 June at 6.45 p.m. All pilgrimage staff and their spouses were invited to the ceremony.
1989	Una Murphy	See above
1993	Dame Maria Amieriye Osunde	
1993	James Werner	World Youth Day, August 1993
April 1994	Percy Beneteau	Awarded the Benemerenti Medal for service to the church and community, Windsor, Ontario, Canada.
1995	Jack WD Andrews	Awarded for Service to the Church including service in the Diocese of Shrewsbury area.
1995	Catherine Ann Cline.	
June 1998	Anne Josephine Redmond	
Nov 1998	Margaret Heywood	Awarded the Benemerenti medal by Pope John Paul II for service to the Parish of Holy Trinity and later to Our Lady and All Saints, Basildon. Margaret was a founding member of the Holy Trinity Parish. Setting up church each Sunday in a builders' hut. She then along with a small group raised funds for the Roundacre Church. After some years The same group then raised funds for the Holy Trinity Church (Now Hall)
July 1999	Jim Colgan	Awarded the Benemerenti medal by Pope John Paul II for service to the Parish of Fintona, County Tyrone.
1999	Eileen Murphy	Awarded the Benemerenti medal by Pope John Paul II for services to the Church in North West London and for her service to Our Lady of Grace Catholic School in Dollis Hill
November 2001	Irene Fleming	Awarded the Benemerenti medal by Pope John Paul II for service to the Church. An orphan, Irene Fleming migrated from her native Trinidad to Canada in her 40's where she worked as a nurse's aide, providing years of charitable service to local priests and others.
July 27, 2002	Mary Hawes	Awarded for her service to the Church.
October 19, 2002	Irene Cameron	Awarded the Benemerenti medal by Pope John Paul II for service to the Church, 50 years work in her parish teaching Religious Education classes, and her long standing role in the music ministry. The medal was presented to her by Fr. Charles Casale.
2002	Mario Kreutzberger	Pope John Paul II bestowed the Benemerenti medal on Kreutzberger, the first non-Catholic to be so honored. Kreutzberger also served as a Special Goodwill Ambassador for UNICEF.
2003	Bob Schaffer	Awarded the Benemerenti medal by Pope John Paul II for service to the Church. Schaffer is also a Knight of the Equestrian Order of the Holy Sepulchre of Jerusalem by confirmation of the Holy See in the name of and by the authority of Pope John Paul II. and a member of the Knights of Columbus, Council 1214 of Fort Collins, Colorado.
2003	Philip Anthony Morris	Awarded at St. Mary's RC Church, Chepstow, Wales for Services to the Parish.

== Awarded by Pope Benedict XVI ==
Date	Person	Notes
25 December 2005	Edna Heagney	Long-standing service as an Extraordinary Minister of Holy Communion and for the support of Edna and her husband Tony to the Diocese of Middlesbrough over many years. It was presented to her at Midnight Mass, Christmas 2005.
2006	Hugh Gerard McGrellis	Lifetime of service to the Church, most notably as an altar server at St Mary Magdalen's Church, Brighton, Sussex, England for over 70 years.
2006	Michael Francis McConnell	His long-standing service as a choirmaster at St Joseph's Cathedral, Dunedin, New Zealand. It was presented to him by His Excellency Apostolic Nuncio Archbishop Charles Balvo at the mass for the feast of St Joseph.
April 2006	Pat and George Dale	In recognition for their service to children. Pat and George fostered more than 80 children over 50 years in the Manchester, U.K area.
26 April 2006	Henry Raaymakers	His service as sacristan of St Joseph's Church, Chatham, Ontario, Canada. The award was presented by Bishop Fabbro.
16 May 2006	Rita C. Karing	In recognition of her service to the St Joseph Catholic Church of Sharon's liturgy committee and parish council and as a eucharistic minister. She also founded and served as head of St Joseph's food pantry for 22 years.
16 Aug 2006	Catherine (Kitty) Coffey	Services to the parish for over 50 years, St Anthony's RC, Woodhouse Park, Wythenshawe, Manchester
17 Dec 2006	Sister Yvette Lalonde	for her continued commitment to the Catholic Church for over 59 years in Ottawa, Ontario, Canada.
2007	John McCreadie	Services to the retired clergy of the Diocese of Middlesbrough, England.
2007	Anthony Brady	Services to the community of the Diocese of Otago, New Zealand.
2007	John Lencioni	Service to the Church at the Diocese of Fresno, California, US.
2007	Jeffrey Gibbons	Exemplary services to St Margaret's Church, Dunfermline, Fife, Scotland.
2 September 2007	John Brennan	Service to Greyfriars Church, Oxford, as organist and choirmaster for more than four decades. Conferred by Bishop William Kenney CP at Greyfriars.
2008	Michael Madden Cork	His outstanding service during his 23 years as sacristan of St Joseph's Church, Riverstick, Cork, Ireland.
2008	William W. Gorman	His service during the Pope's visit to the United States.
2008	Kevin Brennan	His devoted service to the Diocese of Nottingham training and guiding its Extraordinary Ministers of Holy Communion. The presentation was made by Monsignor Canon Thomas McGovern VG on 17 October 2008 at the Immaculate Conception Church, Oadby, Leicestershire, England.
20 April 2008	Rory O Connor	Long-standing service with his wife Brid, to the Parish of St Agnes, Crumlin, Dublin.
27 April 2008	Peggy Wilding and Olive Hewitt	Received the medal at St Theodore of Canterbury Church, Monkwick, Colchester, Suffolk, England. Both have served over 40 years in the Catholic Church holding posts such as chairman and Secretary of the Church Committee as well as being lifelong servants to the Church, and even organising the building of the Church in the 1960s.
2009	Sean O'Connell Thomas Carr Sheila Deed	Awarded for Services to the Roman Catholic Diocese of Brentwood Essex
2009	Richard Gladwell	Host and producer of WXXI's long running live and nationally syndicated radio program With Heart and Voice.
2009	Joe Lomasney	53 years service as sacristan of Church of the Immaculate Conception, Araglen, Diocese of Cloyne, Ireland. It was presented by Most Rev John Magee, Bishop of Cloyne.
2009	John Parnell Murphy	Long-time service to the People of God of the Diocese of Brooklyn, New York. It was presented by Most Rev Nicholas DiMarzio, Bishop of Brooklyn.
2009	Eddie Power	Bishop Eamonn Walsh presented him the medal on 21 June 2009. He had been in charge of the altar server group at St Pius X Church in Templeogue, Dublin since 1974.
13 February 2009	Ada Power	For services to the Diocese of Killaloe, Ireland.
29 March 2009	Harvey Livingston	Former Head of Finance at SCIAF and President of the Glasgow Jewish Representative Council, for services to the Catholic Church in Scotland. The medal was presented by Faustino Sainz Muñoz, Apostolic Nuncio to the Court of St James's, on the fourth anniversary of the Pope's election.
3 May 2009	Charles John Foote	From St George's, Newfoundland, Canada, awarded the Benemerenti medal for over 50 years service to the parish of St Joseph. The award was presented at St Joseph's Church in St George's on 3 May 2009 by Bishop Douglas Crosbie, Bishop of the Diocese of Corner Brook and Labrador.
29 May 2009	Paul Lyng	33 years service as sacristan of Church of the Assumption in Booterstown, County Dublin, Ireland. It was presented by Monsignor Seamus Conway.
7 June 2009	John Parnell Murphy	Long-time service to the People of God of the Diocese of Brooklyn, New York. It was presented by Most Rev Nicholas DiMarzio, Bishop of Brooklyn.
8 July 2009	Tony McAvoy	For his work as a Lay Chaplain in the North East of England with the Apostleship of the Sea (Stella Maris). The medal was presented to him by Séamus Cunningham, Bishop of Newcastle and Hexham, England at the AoS Annual Pilgrimage to Holy Island, Lindisfarne.
31 July 2009	Barbara Conboy, Brigid Hanlon, and John McManus	For services to Sacred Heart Jesuit Church, Edinburgh, Scotland.
October 2009	Colleen Stanford	Sacristan, St Mary's Cathedral, Hobart, Tasmania. Presented by Adrian Doyle, Archbishop of Hobart.
4 October 2009	Patrick Curran	60 years service to the parish of Our Lady Star of the Sea, Greenwich, England. It was presented by Dr Patrick Smith, Metropolitan Archbishop of Southwark.
24 October 2009	Tele'a Fiso	36 Years of service to the Fatu O Aiga Catholic Church, Tafuna American Samoa. It was presented by Bishop John Quinn Weitzel.
25 October 2009	Josephine Knowles	Years of service to the parish of St Columba's, Tonge Moor, Bolton, Greater Manchester, England. It was presented by Fr Francis McCauley.
9 November 2009	Hannah Fairclough	Her devoted service to the Church and community of St. Malachys. Presented by Fr. Michael Buckley.
12 December 2009	Brian Monaghan	His devoted service to the Church and community of the parish of St John the Evangelist, Kilbarrack/Foxfield, Dublin. The medal was presented by Fr Declan Doyle.
12 December 2009	Tony Wagstaffe	Service to the parish of Holy Angels, Ash, Surrey. Presented by Fr David Osbourne.
20 December 2009	Joseph Ryan	30 years of service as Parish Accountant, and other services, to St. Elphege's Church, Wallington, Surrey, England. The medal was presented by Bishop Paul Hendricks.
2010	Michael Kummer	From Stuttgart, Germany, in recognition of his outstanding service over more than 25 years for the Catholic military communities in different countries and especially to the German-speaking parish, Sankt Marien, in Bangkok, Thailand.
10 January 2010	Dennis Selina	Lifetime of service to the Church, including 69 years as church organist. The medal was presented at St Joseph's Church, Pickering, North Yorkshire, England by Fr Bill East.
17 January 2010	Oscar Pioquinto Batucan and Miriam Alvez Batucan	Presented by the Bishop of Auckland, Patrick Dunn. The couple is the first Filipino-New Zealand couple to be awarded the medal.
19 March 2010	John Bannerman	From Invergordon, Ross-shire, Scotland received the medal in St. Joseph's Church, Invergordon. It was presented by Bishop Peter Moran of Aberdeen, Scotland, in recognition of 72 years service to the Catholic Church as an altar server, reader, passkeeper and Eucharistic minister.
2 May 2010	Donald H Williams	From Culloden, Inverness-shire, Scotland received the medal in St. Columba's Church, Culloden, Inverness. It was presented by Bishop Peter Moran of Aberdeen, Scotland.
9 June 2010	Thomas F. Purcell	From Hamilton, New Zealand. He was presented the medal by Bishop Denis Browne, Diocese of Hamilton at St Columba's Parish, Hamilton.
12 June 2010	Peggy Moriarty	From the Bishop of Kerry, Dr Bill Murphy, at Milltown-Listry where Peggy is a parishioner. She received the award for her service to Immaculate Conception Church in Listry, County Kerry, Ireland.
4 July 2010	John Wedgwood	From the Parish of St John the Baptist, in Normanton, West Yorkshire, England, for 72 years of service as organist, school headteacher and several other roles. The medal was presented by Canon Peter Maguire.
12 July 2010	Matthew Yu Min-Teh	For his exceptional Christian commitment and leadership during his presidency at Providence University, Taichung, Taiwan. The medal was presented by the Bishop of Taichung, Martin Su Yao-Wen on 15 September 2010.
12 August 2010	Sheila Miller, Elizabeth Turner, and Ann Hamilton	During a mass held at St Anthony of Padua, Rye, East Sussex, England. The medals were presented by Bishop Kieran Conry and were awarded in recognition of long and exceptional service to the Parish, stretching almost 80 years.
4 September 2010	Patricia Mundy and Joe Davies	On behalf of the Bishop of Shrewsbury, England by Parish Priest Father Stephen Dwyer, assisted by Dr Peter Smith KSG, who presented the medal. Davies was awarded the medal for his years of devoted service to the priests of the parish. Mundy was awarded for her many years of service to St Joseph's Parish, Winsford, Cheshire, England, including her voluntary service as Manager of the parish centre.
7 November 2010	David Risk	For years of dedication to the St. Charles Borromeo parish, North Hollywood, Los Angeles, California. The medal was presented by Roger Cardinal Mahony.
6 December 2010	Titus M. Verzosa	For his 17 years of dedicated service and leadership as a choir director, a finance council member, and a coordinator of several fundraising events for St Mary Queen of Apostles parish in Fresno, California, US. The medal and the accompanying certificate were presented to him on 20 February 2011 during a Sunday Mass by the parish priest Fr Timothy N. Cardoza.
11 December 2010	Mary O'Donoghue	It was presented on behalf of the Archbishop of Westminster, England by Parish Priest of Our Lady of the Holy Souls, Kensal Town, Father Shaun Church. It was awarded for dedication to the parish over 31 years.
24 December 2010	Sarah Philomena Boyle	Recognition of your faithful service to the church of Sacred Heart and Holy Souls, Tipton.
27 December 2010	Miss Mary Burn-Murdoch	Her work in founding the Colmcille Trust and establishing the Catholic House of Prayer Cnoc a'Chalmain on the island of Iona, Scotland. The medal was presented by Bishop Joseph Toal during Mass at St Joseph's, Gilmore Place, Edinburgh, Scotland.
5 January 2011	Nora Mai Daly	From Gortdarrig, Headford, County Kerry, Ireland for her 32 years as sacristan to Our Lady of Perpetual Succour, Shrone. The Medal was presented by Bishop Bill Murphy at a vigil Mass at the parish church in Shrone.
8 January 2011	Mrs Anne Culleton	From Piercestown, County Wexford, Ireland, in recognition of a lifetime of contribution to community and parish life in Piercestown. The medal was presented to Anne by Bishop Denis Brennan during Mass at St Martin's Church, Piercestown.
30 January 2011	Sister Agnes Murray and Sister Maura Fay	From Ballymahon, County Longford, Ireland in recognition of their contribution to music and singing in the liturgy over many years in the Parish of Shrule (Ballymahon). The medals were presented to Sister Agnes and Sister Maura by the Bishop of Ardagh and Clonmacnois, Dr Colm O' Reilly during Mass at St Matthew's Church, Ballymahon.
27 February 2011	Sheila Ratcliffe	From Shaftesbury, Dorset in recognition of her outstanding contribution as Sacristan to the church of The Most Holy Name and St Edward King & Martyr in Shaftesbury for almost 30 years. The medal was presented to Sheila by Fr Dylan James after Mass.
17 April 2011	George M. Serban	From Bakersfield, California, US, in recognition of his outstanding dedication to "Faith, Family & Friends" in lifelong service to St Francis Catholic Parish, Bakersfield, California. Married to Rita M. Serban for more than 50 years; they served the Church with dedicated and unfailing love and self-sacrifice. The medal was presented to George by Msgr Craig Harrison pastor on Passion Sunday Mass, in the presence of his entire family, children, grandchildren and great-grandchild.
15 May 2011	May McGarrity	From Oxford, England, in recognition of her contributions over 65 years as church organist and school governor. May started to play the organ aged 17 at St Patrick's, Yoker, Glasgow, and has been organist and choir mistress to Corpus Christi Church, Headington, Oxford for more than 50 years. She served as governor to St. Joseph's RC School Oxford for 38 years. The medal was presented to May by Fr John Baggley after Mass.
10 July 2011	James Ward	From Stoke-on-Trent, England in recognition of his lifelong work for the Church and the local community. Jim has served the community as a Justice of the Peace for more than 20 years and also as President of Newcastle Players (an amateur dramatic group). His service to the Catholic Community has included being organist at Sacred Heart Catholic Church, Hanley, Stoke-on-Trent, for 40 years, and organising the annual Carol Service attended by the Lord Mayor since 1982. The medal was presented by Bishop David McGough, Auxiliary in the Archdiocese of Birmingham.
30 August 2011	José Frances Keen	In recognition of a lifetime of service to the community and her contribution over 50 years as a founder member of the St. Columba's Foundation of the Union of Catholic Mothers, Chesham, Buckinghamshire. The medal was presented on 27 November by Father Patrick Bailey following a mass and during a reception celebrating the Golden Jubilee of the St. Columba's Foundation in the diocese of Northampton, the group's first meeting having been held on 19 January 1961.
2011	Margaret White	Volunteer Sacristan to the chaplaincy team at Bethlem Royal Hospital, Beckenham, London, England. Medal presented by Bishop Pat Lynch. A thanksgiving service was held at the Bethlem chapel for Margaret and was led by Bishop Lynch — the first ever Catholic Bishop to visit the hospital. The Pope awarded Margaret the Benemerenti medal in recognition of her generous work and commitment to the chapel over nearly 15 years.
2011	Mary Cavan	Retired Office Assistant of the Knights of Saint Columba, Glasgow, in recognition of her 46 years loyal service to the Order.
17 December 2011	Mr Eugene Tumelty	Recently retired as headteacher of St Bernard's School, Barrow, for over 30 years of service to Catholic education in St Bernard's. The medal was awarded by Fr William Glasswell at Our Lady of the Rosary Church, Dalton-in-Furness.
20 December 2011	Jean McGuigan	For her 49 years of dedicated and loyal service to the parishes of St. Joseph's and St. Patrick's in Belfast, Northern Ireland. The medal was awarded by Fr Michael Sheehan, at St Patrick's Church, and was followed by a reception in her honour.
5 February 2012	John and Anna Feldberg	From Rongotea, New Zealand, in recognition of long and exceptional service to the Rongotea Catholic community. The medals were presented by Bishop Cullinane at Sacred Heart Church, Rongotea.
11 February 2012	Lyn Braithwaite, Judith and Martin Wall	From Palmerston North, New Zealand in recognition of Lyn Braithwaite's nearly 60 years of devoted service to Our Lady of Lourdes Parish. Medals were also presented to Judith and Martin Wall, who have loyally served the parish for 50 years. The presentations were by Bishop Peter J. Cullinane at Mass at Our Lady of Lourdes Church on Saturday, 11 February 2012. This was followed by a parish reception to mark their commitment, as well as the 60th anniversary of the parish and also the retirement of the bishop.
29 April 2012	William Cahill	From Gloucester, England, in recognition of his long service to the parish of Our Lady of Perpetual Succour, Churchdown, Gloucester. The presentation was made after Mass by Fr Kevin Hennessey.
20 May 2012	Sheila Stacey	From Markfield, Leicestershire, England, in recognition of her long service as teacher, governor and chair of governors (St Clare's RC primary school, Coalville, Leicestershire). The presentation was made at Mass at the parish church St Wilfrid of York, Coalville on Sunday 20 May (the feast of the Ascension), by headteacher Mrs Jane Monaghan and chair of governors Mrs Sarah Noon, with parish priest Fr Colin Patey.
24 June 2012	Giovanni-Battista Marseglia	From Watford, Hertfordshire, England in recognition of long service and contribution to the music ministry of the Parish of the Sacred Heart and St John the Evangelist, Bushey, and the broader diocesan community. The presentation was made at Mass on the Feast of the Nativity of St. John the Baptist, in a service concelebrated by Parish Priest Fr Jim McNicholas, his predecessors, Fr Guy Sawyer and Fr Michael Markey, and Chaplain to St Michael's Catholic High School, Fr Uchenna Odenigbo.
21 July 2012	Paule Szczech	From Wembley, Middlesex, England in recognition of long service to the Parish of St Joseph's, Wembley. The presentation was made at Mass in a service concelebrated by Bishop John Arnold and Fr John Menonkari, Fr Joseph Kaduthanam, and Fr Brito Fernandes.
8 September 2012	Lorenzo De Toro	From Miami, Florida, US, in recognition of long service to the Church and the cause of a free Cuba. The presentation was made at Mass on the Feast Day of Our Lady of Charity in a service celebrated by Archbishop Thomas Wenski.
13 October 2012	John Craig, Nicholas Dawe and Richard Munt	From Christchurch Consulting Company (New Zealand) for dedicated services to the Christchurch Catholic Community following the devastating earthquakes that occurred in the city (and region) of 2011 and 2012. Medals awarded by Bishop Barry Jones at Holy Mass in St Mary's Pro Cathedral, Christchurch.
25 November 2012	Elizabeth Farrell	From Blanchardstown, Dublin, Republic of Ireland in recognition of long service to the Church. The presentation was made at Mass in St Patrick's Church, Corduff.
13 December 2012	Christina Power	From Partington, Manchester, England in recognition of long service to the Church. The presentation was made at Mass in English Martyrs Church, Manchester.
2012	Una O'Malley	From Northampton, England. Born in County Carlow, Ireland, she moved to Northampton at age 18. The award was made to recognize 35 years loyal service as Housekeeper at the Bishops House and the Cathedral 1979 to 2014. The presentation was made at a full Mass in Northampton Cathedral by Bishop Peter Doyle.
13 January 2013	Teresa Aylott	For services to the church, the community and charities. Pope Benedict XVI was represented by Bishop John Arnold at Our Lady of Mount Carmel and St George Church in Enfield, Middlesex, England during the second Mass.
21 January 2013	Maura Cotter and Russell Luke	From Immaculate Conception Parish, Oadby, Leicestershire, England, in recognition of long service to the Church. The presentation was made at the blessing of the newly renovated parish rooms by Bishop Malcolm, 9th Bishop of Nottingham.
27 January 2013	Patrick J. Reardon	From The Most Holy Redeemer, Billericay, Essex, England in recognition of his devotion to the Church and work for the community as a Most Holy Redeemer parishioner. The presentation was made at 11:00 am Mass in Billericay by Fr John.
2 February 2013	Peter Reynolds	From Blanchardstown Parish, Dublin, in recognition of long service to the Church. The presentation was made at a special mass in Blanchardstown by Bishop Raymond Field.
May 2013	Patrick Broderick	In recognition of his lifelong service to the Church. Presented in Limerick, Maine, USA
26 May 2013	Catherine Doody	For services to the church and the community. The award was presented at St Ethelbert's Church in Slough, Berkshire, England. Pope Benedict XVI was represented by Bishop Peter Doyle.
26 May 2013	Madge Meehan	For services to the church. The award was presented at St Ethelbert's Church, Slough, Berkshire, England. Pope Benedict XVI was represented by Bishop Peter Doyle

== Awarded by Pope Francis ==
Date	Person	Notes
May 2013	John Joseph (Sean) Broderick	In recognition of his lifelong service to the Church. Presented 3 November 2013.
11 August 2013	Colleen Wilby	In recognition for all that she had done and brought to the community in New Alresford, England in enhancing the music over the last 25 years. Colleen's commitment has been considered to be truly extraordinary, and with the exception of two weeks holiday each year and the occasional family commitment she has played for every Sunday Mass, and at Christmas and Easter celebrations.
5 March 2014	Noel O'Hanlon	In recognition of services to St Philip and St James Catholic Church, Brickhill, Bedford
19 April 2014	Lily Leacy	For long and dedicated service to St. Aidan's Cathedral in Enniscorthy, Ireland. Presented by Bishop of the Roman Catholic Diocese of Ferns, Denis Brennan at Saturday Vigil Mass, on behalf of Pope Francis.
17 July 2014	Gerardine Babb	For services to the Catholic church, community and education, in particular for her 12 years of service as Headteacher of St William of York RC Primary School, Bolton, England.
23 October 2014	Alan Wratten	In recognition of his lifelong service to the Inverell Catholic Church, NSW, Australia Awarded by Bishop Michael Kennedy on 4th Jan, 2015.
13 November 2014	Mary Moore	Completing seventeen years of service as sacristan at St. Patrick Church in Boher, County Limerick, Ireland.
23 November 2014	Manikrao K. Guldeokar	Amravati, India.
10 January 2015	Dr Charles Holland Wagamon and Mrs Marion Rose Holick Wagamon	For 65 years of distinguished service and contributions to their Parish, Diocese, family, community and social justice, the Wagamons were formally presented their Benemerenti medals during Mass by the Rev. Fred Valone, Pastor, St Thomas the Apostle Catholic Church in Huntsville, Texas, US.
16 January 2015	Mr Patrick R Murphy	Presented in recognition of 50 years of work as a teacher, school governor, catechist and charity worker. Bishop Tom Burns of Swansea presented Murphy's medal on behalf of Pope Francis during Mass at the Church of SS David and Patrick, Haverfordwest, Wales.
7 February 2015	Julina Elizabeth Fowler Patterson	For long and dedicated service to the church and the community in Peebles in the Scottish Borders. The award was presented at St Joseph's Church in Peebles at the Vigil Mass on Saturday. Father Wojciech Rybka presented the award on behalf of Pope Francis.
19 June 2015	Sheila Conway	In recognition of her services to the Star of the Sea Parish, and to local charities, Sheila was formally presented with the medal during a special mass at The Star of the Sea church, Portstewart, County Londonderry, Northern Ireland. The spokesman for the Diocese, Fr Edward Magee said: "This is recognition for the tremendous work and service that Sheila has given to both the church and the local community." The service also celebrated the golden jubilee of the ordination of Bishop Anthony Farquhar.
25 August 2015	Alan Ginsburg	Ginsburg was presented the medal "for his vision in creating a space where Catholic and Jewish students can fulfill their spiritual needs, side by side" at the University of Central Florida where he funded the construction of the Catholic Campus Ministry Center and the adjacent Hillel Center.
15 November 2015	Mr Augustine Pereira	Mr Pereira joined St Joseph's (Victoria Street, Singapore) parish's children's choir at the age of seven and continued on to the adult choir. He was also an altar server, especially during the painful Japanese Occupation, when he assisted in many funerals. He was also a long-standing Vincentian, and served as a warden and informal "car-park attendant" from the 1950s, until ill health in 2003 prevented him from doing so.
15 November 2015	Professor James Newton Boss	He contributed to St Joseph's Church (Victoria Street, Singapore) local church history when he wrote The Portuguese Mission in Singapore (1825–1999): St Joseph's Church. He also secured the grant from the Preservations of Monument Board which enabled the stained glass windows of the church to be restored to their former glory. In addition to being chairman of the Parish Pastoral Council and a long-standing member of other organisations, Prof Boss has also assisted the church in innumerable negotiations in securing its Catholic heritage status. He was conferred a knighthood by Rome in 2007 — the Sovereign Military Hospitaller Order of St John of Jerusalem of Rhodes and of Malta.
20 November 2015	Margaret Keating	Awarded for humble and quiet service to the parish and community of Castlemahon, Co. Limerick, Ireland.
December 2015	Sylvia Foster	Sylvia Foster, of Corpus Christi with St Joseph Church, Portsmouth was recognised for her outstanding support and continued commitment to Portsmouth's sister diocese of Bamenda, Cameroon. Medal was presented by Bishop Philip Egan.
5 December 2015	Mrs Eileen Healy,	Medal was presented by Bishop Robert Byrne at the Oxford Oratory in recognition of her long and devoted service to the Church, especially by serving as a cook and housekeeper to many priests.
24 December 2015	Carole Ann Crowther	Awarded for services to the young people of St Clare's Church, Fagley, West Yorkshire, England. Leading the liturgy group on a Saturday evening and also preparing young people for Holy Communion for decades.
1 May 2016	Anthony Malone	Awarded for over 60 years dedicated service to the Church of the Sacred Heart in the parish of Donnybrook, Dublin 4, Ireland
8 May 2016	Mary Sheppard	Awarded for services to St George's Church, South Darenth, Kent, England. Being sacristan, counsellor and friend for over 50 years.
28 May 2016	Keyna Godward	For long and dedicated service to the parish of Great Missenden and Wendover, Buckinghamshire, England.
9 October 2016	Joan Merrigan	Awarded for dedicated service to the Sallynoggin Parish, Dublin, Ireland.
13 November 2016	Teresita Nixon	Teresita Nixon, a member of Sacred Heart Parish in Delta, British Columbia, Canada, is the founder of the Richmond-based Aquinas Institute, which is committed to sharing resources with the needy around the world. Among the institute's works is offering scholarships to needy university students in Canada and the Philippines. Aquinas Institute, dedicated to the Holy Family, has organized and sponsored successful religious events for Catholics in Vancouver and the Lower Mainland, including Advent and Lent retreats, Holy Hours, and youth conferences. In 2004, Aquinas Institute released its first publication, the Meditations on the Holy Eucharist, sold in Canada, the US and Europe. Teresita has been responsible for the publication of devotional books, and she leads charitable events for local, national, and international charities. She was instrumental in organizing the Table of Hope banquet for more than 1,000 needy children at the 2016 International Eucharistic Congress in the Philippines. Source: "Papal Honours 2016", The BC Catholic, 7 November 2016, p. 9. Teresita received the Papal Honour Award - Benemerenti medal from Pope Francis through Most Rev J Michael Miller, CSB, Archbishop of Vancouver, during the Mass at the Closing of the Holy Door for the Jubilee Year of Mercy at Holy Rosary Cathedral, Vancouver, British Columbia.
17 February 2017	James Sewell	Mr James Sewell has, for almost 50 years, provided dedicated financial and accounting services to the Our Lady of Dolours Servite Church in Fulham, England. The whole church community is proud of Mr Sewell, and grateful for his long and most generous service.
2017	Allan Peter MacIsaac	Allan was joined by family, and parish friends to receive the Benemerenti Medal, a fitting recognition of his years of dedicated service in Kinlochleven.
3 November 2017	Sally Corby	Sally Corby retired in December 2014 after 31 years of serving the spiritual welfare of the youth of the Diocese of Nashville. At the time of her retirement, she was the associate director of the Catholic Youth Office. During her tenure she facilitated 284 retreat weekends with more than 10,000 participants, 30 Youth Leadership Workshops, a four-day conference in Christian Leadership, and served the youth of the local church in countless other efforts.
28 January 2018	Ewan O'Flynn	Ewan O'Flynn was for many years the sacristan of St. Mary's and also a tremendous support to the many priests who have passed through Lucan. His late wife Joan was well known through her writings and her involvement with the Lucan Newsletter, she also contributed a great deal to the liturgical life of the parish.
28 January 2018	Billy Bernie	Billy Birnie is the second member of his family to receive the Benemerenti medal, his late brother Laddie was the recipient some years ago. Billy and his late wife Nancy have played a huge role in the life of St. Mary's through the years and thanks to them the new generation of the family continues that tradition.
23 February 2018	Cornelius O'Dwyer	Awarded "... in recognition of service to Church and Community over a long period".
25 February 2018	Irene Sidorczuk	She was a Teacher at Saint Mary's R C School, Langley, Greater Manchester from 1950-retirement in 1986. She was Chairperson of North Manchester Walsingham Association from its inception in the 1970s right up into her 90's, as well as being Trustee and Treasurer of the Middleton Branch of Salford Diocese Catholic Fellowship, and she volunteered at the local SVP charity shop until she was 93.
12 March 2018	Johnny Nelis	For decades of service managing and fundraising for the Annunciation Church, Chesterfield.
20 July 2018	Kathleen Smith	Sacristan to The Most Holy Family Church, Llandudno Junction. Reception by Bishop Peter Brignal, Fr. Moses Amune and Fr. Augustine Franklin.
22 August 2018	Alan Edmondson	For over 40 years Alan Edmondson has served at St. Vincent's Hospital, and now Nursing Home (Pinner), faithfully & steadfastly as a General Manager and Trustee with great love, energy and passion.
15 December 2018	Bridie Cronin	Awarded "Implemented the first Safeguarding Children policies to the Diocese of Kerry, helping every parish train and draw up their own safe practices when working with children."
22 December 2018	Robert O'Leary	Awarded for service to the community of Gowran, Co. Kilkenny, Ireland, for playing the church organ at all occasions for 37 years. Robert is a self-taught organist and led the parish choir, along with wife Gretta, throughout his 37 years service.
24 December 2018	Trevor Cryan	Awarded for long and dedicated service St Mary Magdalene Church, Maltby, Rotherham, England. Trevor and his family have provided music to the church and surrounding parish for over 40 years. With his family Ministry in Music Trevor has played for hundreds of weddings, baptisms, funerals, healing services and celebration days. Trevor also dedicates his life to supporting the church through leading Scripture studies, Journey in Faith groups, Marian days, Prayer Group, Medjugorje Prayer Meetings and more. Fr May summed him up in a few words as "a faithful servant to God's people".
23 October 2019	John E Williams	Awarded for 50 years service as Organist and Choirmaster at St.Josephs RC Church, Colwyn Bay, North Wales.
October 2019	Luke de Pulford	Awarded for service to the anti-slavery movement. Presented by Fr Mark Vickers at the Parish Church of the Holy Ghost & St Stephen, Shepherd's Bush, London.
16 December 2019	Hanna Szkudlarek	She was rewarded for raising 9 sons and serving the church in helping the poor and needy in the parish of St. Józef in Kalisz
24 January 2020	Kitty Kelly	Kelly, 89 years old in 2020 and organist at St. Patrick's church in Lifford, was presented the medal by Bishop Donal McKeown.
11 September 2020	Rhonda Maingot, Deborah de Rosia, Leela Ramdeen, and Sister Ruth Montrichard	Papal representative to the Antilles Archbishop Fortunatus Nwachukwu, who said he had heard of their work not only in the archdiocese, but in other dioceses around the Caribbean, made the presentation in a COVID-19 correct ceremony at the residence of Archbishop Jason Gordon in Port of Spain, the capital city of Trinidad and Tobago.
October 2020	Deacon Simon Lesenyeho	Received the Bene Merenti medal in Kroonstad, South Africa from the hands of Bishop Peter Holiday on 9 October 2020, at the request of the Sisters of Notre Dame de Namur. Deacon Simon, aged 75, had been a member of the Notre Dame St Peter's Board of Governors for over 30 years, and had been very concerned about poor hungry children and other school needs during these years. The medal was presented to him for his devoted and long-standing service to the wider community during the final Mass of the 2020 school year, celebrated in a COVID-19 correct manner in the school chapel.
20 July 2020	Christopher Robert Penny	Awarded for dedicated service to the Church. Presented by Fr Peter Kelly of St Columba's Church, Banchory, Scotland.
20 November 2020	Bernard (Bunny) and Enid Honiss	Awarded for their service and contributions for more than 100 combined years to the Catholic Church, Auckland diocese, their parish, family, Catholic school, youth, and community.
18 July 2021	Bridget Connolly	In recognition of 35 years dedicated service, as sacristan, at St. Abina's Church, Clondrohid, Macroom. Co. Cork. Ireland. Presented by the Most Reverend William Crean and Fr. Rowan PP.
21 August 2021	Brid Sammin	Awarded for her work in her parish, spending over 40 years in service of St. Patrick's Church, Lecanvey, County Mayo in Ireland, and for all of her work in the local community. Presented by Father Charlie McDonnell.
26 March 2022	Dr. John Dorner	Presented by the Archbishop of Ottawa-Cornwall, Marcel Damphousse in recognition of Dr. John Dorner's career in Catholic education, his work in social and climate justice, for his outstanding service to the cause of refugees, the poor, the elderly and sick, and his witness to the faith in many areas of life inside the Church and in the community.
9 August 2022	Roger Ian Robinson	Presented by Bishop Thomas Neylon on 22 January 2023 in recognition of Ian's outstanding volunteer service as grounds manager at the parish of Our Lady and All Saints, Parbold in Lancashire, England.
15 August 2022	Rene Kennelly	Presented by Killarney Parish Administrator Fr Kieran O'Brien in St Mary's Cathedral, Killarney, in recognition of her years of great service to the Church. Rene has designed and overseen the construction of the life-size festive season crib for the 48 years previous and her incredible work of art has become a seasonal tourist attraction in its own right with people travelling long distances specifically to see it. The crib features life-sizes figures, a striking stable, animals, fir trees and moss as well as a very realistic life-like water feature.
28 September 2022	Maria Stocker	Presented by parish priest Josef Zwyssig of St. Martin Catholic Church in Buochs, Switzerland. Maria received the Benemerenti medal in recognition of her 63 years of dedicated service and contributions to multiple church communities. Including parishes in Fulham, Stow-On-The-Wold, Great Wakering & Shoeburyness as well as her long lasting voluntary work and contributions to Nazareth House, Southend-On-Sea.
8 October 2022	Bernard Cooper	Presented by Fr Gary Buckby, Parish Priest at the Church of Our Lady and St Rose of Lima, Weoley Castle, Birmingham, UK, on behalf of Archbishop Bernard Longley in recognition of over 60 years of service to the Church. Bernard served as an altar boy from a young age and continued to serve as a member of the Guild of St. Stephen, such that he received the bronze, silver and gold medals. Bernard has been an active member of his current parish for 30 years, where he has been a reader and an extraordinary minister of Holy Communion. He frequently visited the sick and housebound to take them Holy Communion and undertook many other good works in his own time. In the latter part of his professional life, Bernard became the first Clergy Welfare Coordinator for the Roman Catholic Archdiocese of Birmingham, which was a role he cherished and undertook with great zeal. In retirement, he continues to assist many elderly members of the clergy in all sorts of ways. Through his faith, which has been fruitful in its good works, Bernard has been a true witness of Christian charity.
20 November 2022	Sr Consolata (Mary) Bracken	Sister Consolata (Mary) Bracken was awarded the papal Benemerenti Medal on November 20, 2022, by Bishop Ray Browne in Listowel, County Kerry, Ireland. This honour recognized her lifelong music ministry, playing the organ, and directing the parish choir since August 1965.
19 January 2023	Bridie Magee	In recognition of her lifelong service to the Church, Parish of Cooley. Presented by Eamon Martin Archbishop of Armagh and the Primate of All Ireland.
11 May 2023	Margaret Kerbey	Presented by Bishop Alan Williams
2 July 2023	Deacon Tito Pereira	Presented by Fr Patrick Adusei Poku, Parish Priest of Our Lady of Lourdes Parish, Acton, West London on behalf of His Eminence, Cardinal Vincent Nichols, Archbishop of Westminster in recognition of over 35 years of service to the parish and its community.
22 July 2023	Marie Callanan	Marie has been an active member of her local church for most of her life. She has been awarded the Benemerenti Medal in recognition of over 60 years dedicated service and contributions to St Teresa's Church in Castledaly County Galway Ireland. Presented by Bishop Michael Duignan.
6 September 2023	Edward (Eddie) Sweetman	Eddie has been Parish Sacristan/Clerk from 1979 to 2021 in St. Mary's Church, Irishtown, Clonmel, Co. Tipperary, Ireland. He has been awarded the Benemerenti Medal in recognition of his dedication and contribution to the Parish. The Medal was presented by Very Rev. Fr. Billy Canon Meehan, Parish Priest and 8 other priests who Eddie has worked with over the years were in attendance.
17 September 2023	Stephan Breu	Presented by the Bishop of the Roman Catholic Diocese of Mukachevo, Mykola Petro Lutschok, OP, for his support of the Diocese and the Roman Catholic Church in Ukraine in general during wartime.
8 November 2023	Colette Sharp	Presented by Monsignor John Ryan of St. Bede's Parish Church in Rotherham, South Yorkshire, England. Colette was awarded the Benemerenti Medal for her life-long devotion and service to the parish of St. Bede's, serving as a Eucharistic Minister for over 50 years, in addition to roles as reader, church flower arranger and secretarial duties to the parish. She was also recognised for her work as chief handmaid to the Hallam Lourdes Pilgrimage, a role which she fulfilled for over 25 years. She still attends and helps the Hallam Pilgrimage to this day. Colette has devoted her life to the parish in lay duties in addition to raising her family of four children in the way of Christ's teaching. Dr R. Brynes & Pilgrimage Director Mr. A. Prior supported this nomination and where in attendance when Colette received the award on her son Gavin's 50th birthday on 31 December 2023.
3 December 2023	Dr. Steven Cheeseman	Presented by the Most Rev. Frank J. Caggiano, Bishop of Bridgeport in recognition of Dr. Cheeseman's long service to the Church and for his leadership in Catholic Education.
24 December 2023	Audrey Salmon	Presented by the Very Rev. Fr. Declan Brett, Parish Priest. Mrs Salmon was awarded the medal for her 25 years of extraordinary work she has carried out for both St Helen's Church in Hoyland, and St Michael's Church in Wombwell. Her dedication to the Union of Catholic Mothers at Parish, Diocesan, and National level was noted. Mrs Salmon's was also commended for founding Wombwell's AgeWell Group, and also her volunteer work for Wombwell's Lunch Club.
25 April 2024	Mary Byrne	Presented in Lourdes by Bishop William Crean in recognition of Mrs Byrne's long service to the church in her home parish of Cobh (Cork, Ireland) and for her tireless work in organising the annual Diocese of Cloyne pilgrimage to Lourdes for more than 40 years.
9 June 2024	Carmel Keane	Presented by the Very Rev. Canon Tom Farrell in recognition of Ms Keane's over 20 years of youth work and leadership within Coventry City, and the wider Diocesan Youth Services. In the course of Ms Keane's work she organised pilgrimages across the world for underprivileged youth groups, including an annual trip to Lourdes.
7 September 2024	Henjie and Teresita San Juan	Henjie and Teresita San Juan have devoted their married life to the pastoral work of Couples for Christ Canada and for incorporating the mission with the larger mission of the Church. They do this by providing online training, presenting at parishes across the country, and collaborating with the Office of Filipino Ministry in the Archdiocese of Vancouver. Always ready to help make connections in the work of supporting families and the life of faith, Henjie has most recently served as National Director of Couples for Christ Canada and Chairman of ANCOP Canada.
12 September 2024	Paddy Gilligan	Presented by Fr Gary Darby, parish Priest of the Church of Sacred Heart and St Brigid, Kilcullen, Co. Kildare in recognition of 56 years of dedicated voluntary service and contribution to both Kilcullen and Gormanstown parishes including serving on school boards, on the parish finance committee and on the parish council.
7 February 2025	Julie Sweeney	Presented by Bishop Patrick McKinney, 10th Bishop of Nottingham, in recognition for over 20 years of dedication to the Education service covering the dioceses of Nottinghamshire, Derbyshire, Leicestershire, and Lincolnshire. Julie’s dedication has ensured that hundreds of thousands of children have received the highest quality education whilst following the teachings of Jesus and his Church.
24 February 2025	Brian Kelly	Presented by Bishop John Lewis Adams of the Diocese of Palmerston North in recognition of years of dedicated voluntary service and contribution to Sacred Heart parish Hastings including serving on school boards, on the parish finance committee and on the parish council. Brian accepted his medal on behalf of all the volunteers that he's had the pleasure to work alongside during his many years of service.

== Awarded by Pope Leo XIV ==
Date	Person	Notes
9 August 2026	Morgan Roughan	Presented by Bishop Fintan Monaghan on Scattery Island, Kilrush, Co.Clare in recognition of Morgan's devotion to Knockerra Parish Choir as organist for over 40 years
