= K. Chinnamma =

Indian woman social worker

- Born: 1883; Travancore, British India
- Died: 1930 (aged 46–47); Travancore
- Occupation(s): Social worker, Woman activist

K. Chinnamma was a feminist, social worker and woman activist from Kerala, India. In 1918, she started Raja Sreemoolam Thirunal Shashtyabda Poorthi Smaraka Hindu Mahila Mandiram (S.M.S.S Hindu Mahila Mandiram now), Kerala state's first home for destitute women. She founded the institution with the aim of educating, empowering and rehabilitating girls from less privileged backgrounds, irrespective of religion or caste.

== Biography ==
K. Chinnamma was born in 1883 in a typical farming family in Attingal, Thiruvananthapuram to Kalyani Amma of Attingal Edavamadam House and Velayudhan Pillai. Poverty, oppression and destitution suffered by vulnerable women have plagued Chinnamma from an early age. Encouraged by her maternal aunt, she attended Fort High School and was one of the first girl students there. After completing her basic education at Senana Mission Girls' School, Thiruvananthapuram, she obtained her FA degree from Thiruvananthapuram Women's College. After education she joined the Department of Public Instruction as Assistant Inspector. Chinnamma who was appointed as assistant to the then school inspector Karapit, was in charge of eleven taluks.

=== Personal life and death ===
Chinnamma was married to Kumara Pillai, son of C. V. Raman Pillai's brother Tehsildar Narayana Pillai. Chinnamma lived in Kottayam with her husband and children. She died in 1930.

== Social service and activism ==
When M.C. Sankara Pillai wrote in a publication that women are reproductive machines, Chinnamma and her classmate Kalyani Amma sharply criticized it. In 1911, while presiding over a women's conference, she met Theerthapada Paramahamsa and on his advice she focused on social work.

Chinnamma, who advocated for the rights of married officials, has founded several women's societies. In 1908, K. Chinnamma was appointed School Inspector in the Kottayam Division of Travancore. As part of her work, she visited Christian schools run by nuns and saw orphanages affiliated with schools for Christian children. So she wondered what it would be like to start a shelter home for orphans and widows in the Hindu community. In 1916, Chinnamma spoke about her idea at a women's conference on the occasion of the 60th birthday of the then King of Travancore, Sreemoolam Thirunal, but no one supported her idea.

Mrs. P. Raman Thampi, who was the head of the women's society, organized the 'Shashtipurthi Maholsavam' (60th birthday celebration) and entrusted Chinnamma with the task. She had a surplus of Rs. 200 in her hand after the celebrations. In the discussion on what to do with the remaining money, Chinnamma once again raised the need for a house for needy women. There was still strong opposition but later Mrs. Raman Thampi supported the idea. Chinnamma delivered a powerful speech there, roughly translating: “Most of us gathered here have proper food and clothing. But many women who have none of this end up begging. Many of you may not have seen it. But if we have the heart, we must surely help these helpless women, in honor of the King who did so much for women's education".

The speech worked and in 1918, Raja Sreemoolam Thirunal Shashtyabda Poorthi Smaraka Hindu Mahila Mandiram was established at Thiruvananthapuram. She developed it as an institution that provides education and vocational training to poor girls. She also ran a women's publication called Mahila Mandir. When it was rumored that Chinnamma had used her power to use teachers for the Mahila Mandir, she was removed from the post of school inspector. She later became the headmistress of the Petta Higher Secondary School. Chinnamma ignored the existing untouchability in Kerala at that time and admitted lower caste girls to attend school.

Later Chinnamma quit her job and worked for Mahila Mandir full time. She traveled a lot to raise money for this institution.

== Honors ==
Mahila Mandir and Chinnamma who led it has been praised by national leaders including Jawaharlal Nehru and Annie Besant. Chinnamma Memorial Girls High School in Thiruvanathapuram is named after her. In remembrance of Chinnamma's outstanding contributions and selfless services, Mahila Mandiram provided educational assistance to 100 girls as part of its Centenary Celebrations.

In 2019 November, the Indian Postal Department issued a special cover to mark the centenary of SMSS Hindu Mahila Mandiram started by Chinnamma. The cover carries a special stamp with picture of K. Chinnamma on it.
