= Avanavancherry =

- village
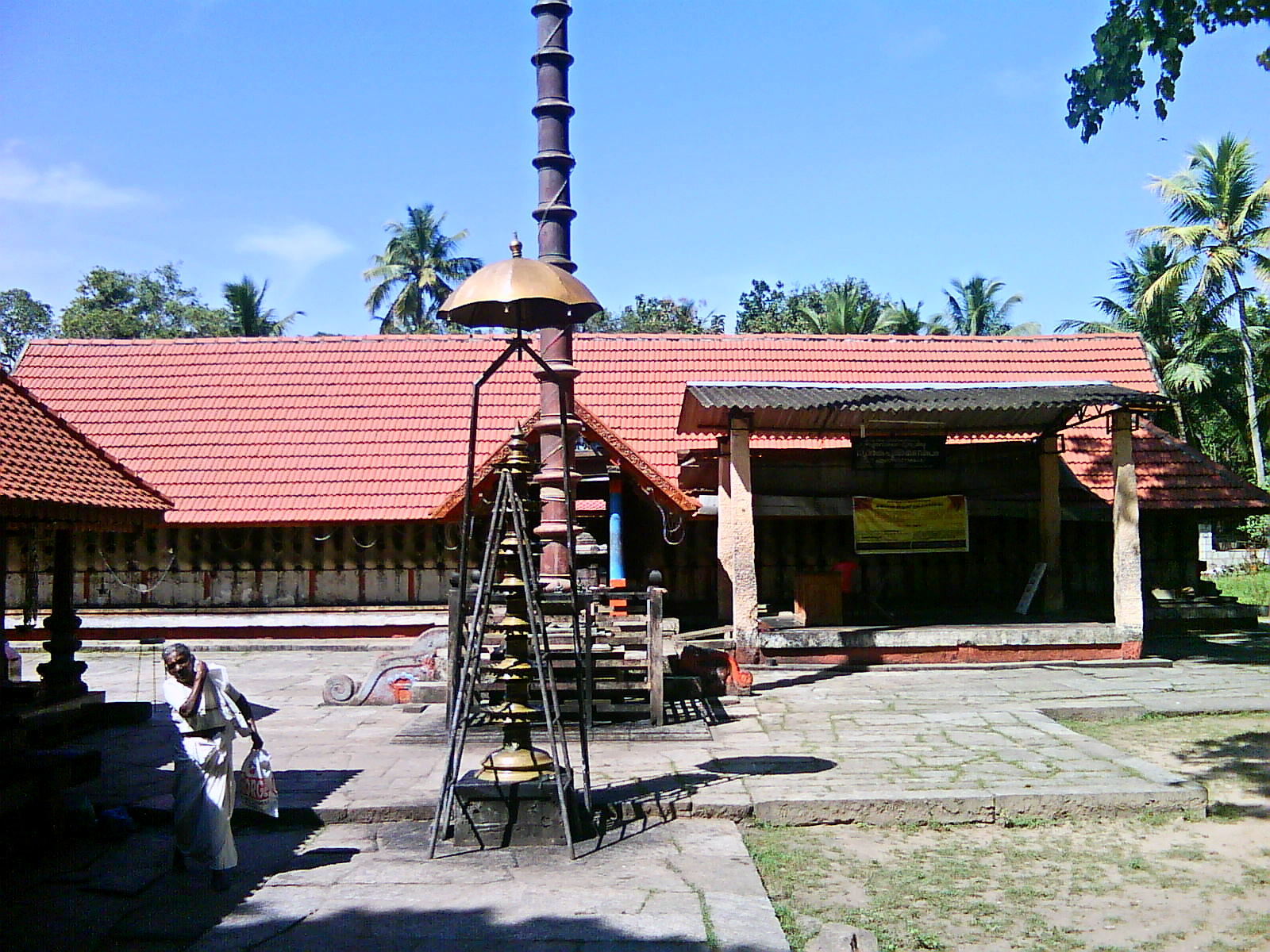
- Avanavancherry Temple

- Location in Kerala, India Avanavancherry (India)
- Coordinates: 8.6884035°N 76.8368179°E
- Country: India
- State: Kerala
- District: Thiruvananthapuram
- Talukas: Chirayinkeezhu

Languages
  - Official: Malayalam, English
- Time zone: UTC+5:30 (IST)
- PIN: 695103
- Vehicle registration: KL- 16

Avanavancherry is a village in Thiruvananthapuram district in the state of Kerala, India.

Avanavanchery is located near Attingal in Thiruvananthapuram District of Kerala. This residential area is situated between Moonnu mukku and Valakkad on Attingal – Venjaramoodu Road. Avanavanchery is around 3 km from Attingal, 3 km from Valakkad, and 8.5 km from Venjaramoodu. Main landmarks are Avanavanchery Juma Masjid, Avanavanchery Sree Indilayappan Temple, Avanavanchery Telephone Exchange, Sub Station, Govt. High School etc. The nearest railheads are Kadakkavur Railway Station and Chirayinkil Railway Station. Airport close to Avanavancherry is Trivandrum International Airport.

Avanavanchery Sri Indilayappan Temple (Malayalam: അവനവഞ്ചേരി ശ്രീ ഇണ്ടിളയപ്പൻ ക്ഷേത്രം) is a popular Hindu temple in Attingal of Thiruvananthapuram district, Kerala. The temple is dedicated to Lord Indilayappan and is one of the oldest temples in the state of Kerala. Lord Indilayappan is worshipped by devotees for getting good health, courage and better life prospects.

The primary deity of the temple is Lord Shiva and Umamaheswara. The Temple sub deities are Lord "Unni Ganapathy" (Baby Ganesha), Sree Dharmashastha (Lord Ayyappan) and Naga Devatas. There is a separate sanctuary for Mallan Thamburan.

== Location ==
The temple is Located in Attingal, Kerala about 3 km South-East of Attingal Town Centre. The temple can be easily reached by Autorickshaws from Attingal Town KSRTC Bus Stand. The nearest major railway station is Varkala Sivagiri. (16 km) The nearest airport is Trivandrum International Airport. (30 km)
