= Dame Maria Amieriye Osunde =

Nigerian educator

Maria Amieriye Osunde
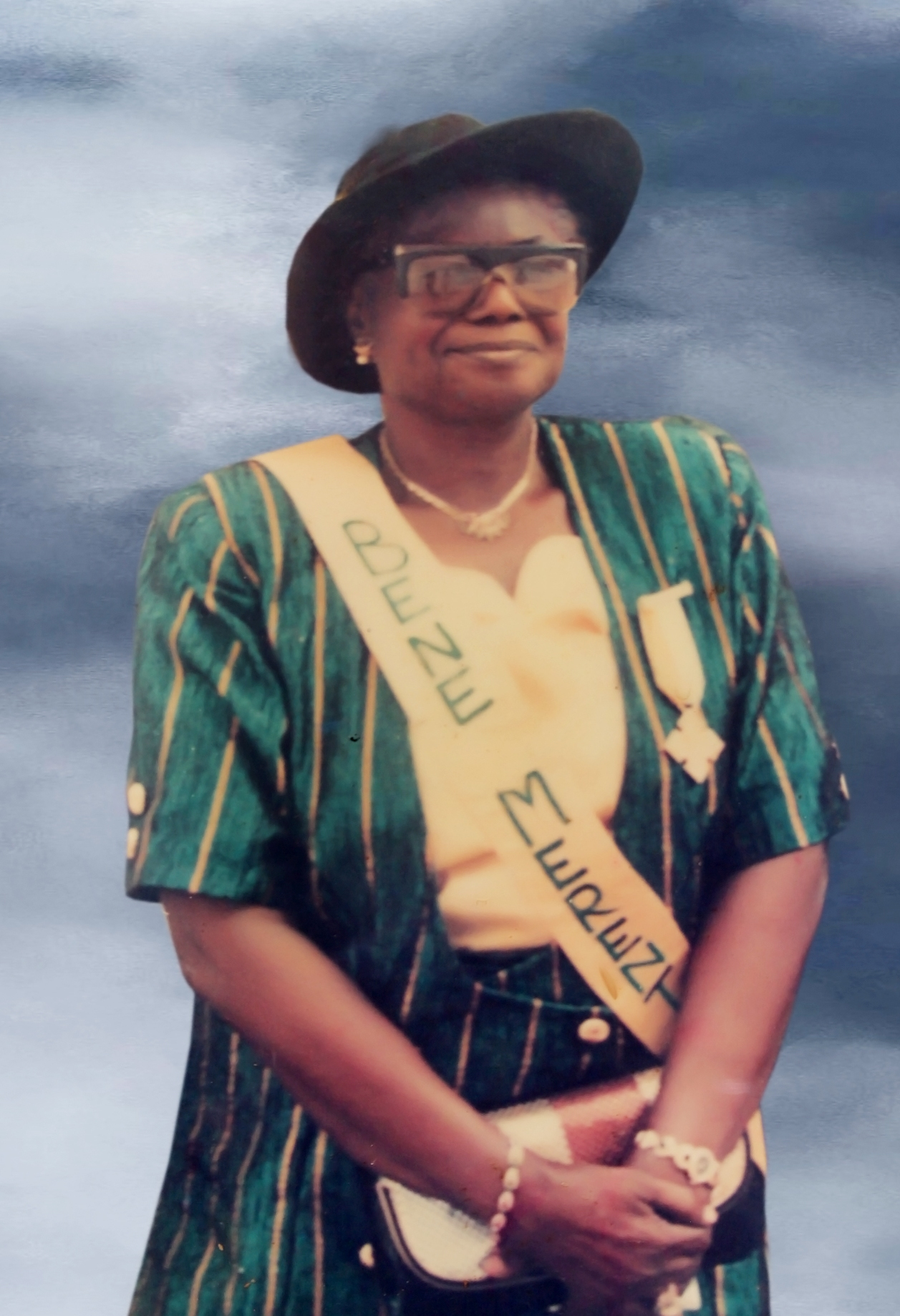
- Photo from Benemerenti medal Award Conferment, November 1993
- Born: 13 September 1928; Benin City, Nigeria
- Died: 26 November 2008 (aged 80); Benin City, Nigeria

Dame Maria Amieriye Osunde (1928–2008) was a Nigerian educator who founded Auntie Maria School.

She was honoured by Pope John Paul II with a Benemerenti medal in 1993, and has also received an award of excellence from the President’s Inter-state Secondary School Debate, Nigeria, Edo state chapter.

== Published works ==
The Teacher My Memoirs, Benin, 2005.
