= Sukumar (writer) =

Indian satirist and cartoonist (1932–2023)

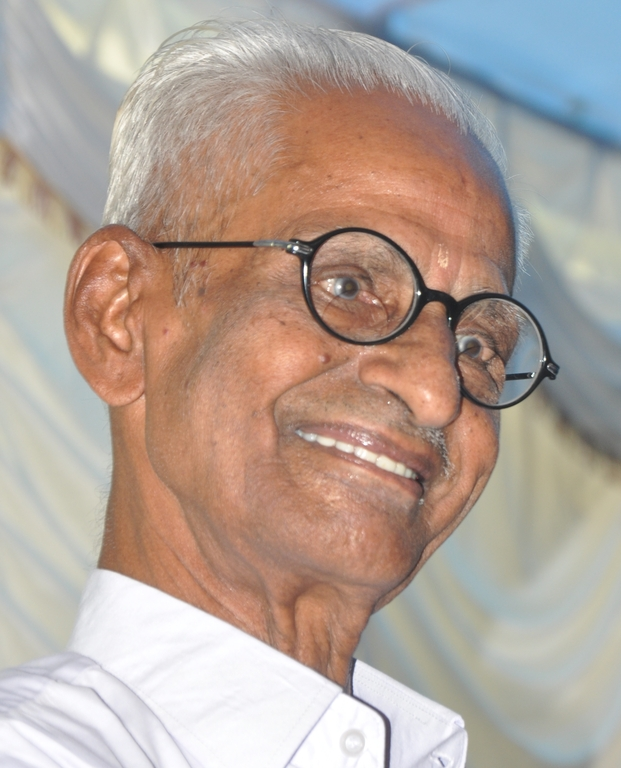
- Born: S. Sukumaran Potti; 9 July 1932; Attingal, Kingdom of Travancore, British India (present day Thiruvananthapuram, Kerala, India)
- Died: 30 September 2023 (aged 91); Kakkanad, Kochi, Ernakulam, Kerala, India
- Education: Bachelor of Arts
- Alma mater: University College Thiruvananthapuram
- Occupations: Cartoonist; Satirist; Writer
- Spouse: Savithri
- Children: 2
- Parents: R. Subbarayan Potti; S. Krishnammal

S. Sukumaran Potti (9 July 1932 – 30 September 2023), commonly known as Sukumar, was an Indian satirist and cartoonist from the state of Kerala.

Sukumar completed his education from University College, Thiruvananthapuram and joined the Kerala Police Department. He started his literary life as a cartoonist in Kerala Kaumudi and later became a full-fledged writer and satirist. Along with Veloor Krishnankutty, Sukumar was one of the most popular humour writers of his time. He received the Kerala Sahitya Akademi Award in the year 1996 for the work Vayil Vannathu Kothakku Pattu.

== Death ==
Sukumar died on 30 September 2023, at the age of 91.
