= Ray Blake =

English Catholic priest (1953–2025)

The Reverend Ray Blake
- Born: 17 November 1953; Guildford, Surrey, United Kingdom
- Died: 3 July 2025 (aged 71); Brighton, United Kingdom
- Education: University of Southampton (BA, English)
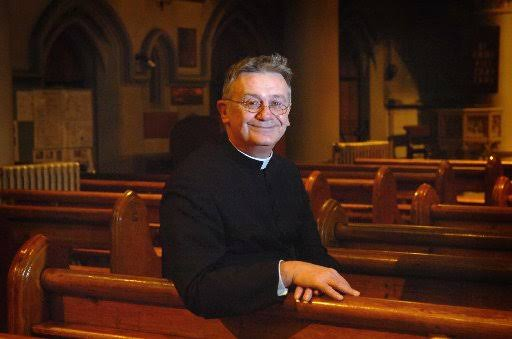
- Occupations: Priest; Blogger Fr Ray Blake at St. Mary Magdalen's church, Brighton, UK
- Years active: 1981–2023

Raymond Blake (17 November 1953 – 3 July 2025) was an English Catholic priest and religious blogger. Considered a Traditionalist Catholic, he was the priest at St Mary Magdalen's Church in Brighton from 2000 until 2023.

Blake's blog, which he established in 2006, gained attention in the local and national press for his more traditionalist ways, such as restoring the older neo-Gothic design of St Mary Magdalen's Church.

== Biography ==
Blake was born in Guildford on 17 November 1953, to Frank and Maria Blake. His father ran a building company; his Italian Catholic mother Maria agreed for her children to be brought up as Anglicans. He attended the local comprehensive school and read English at the University of Southampton. Blake worked in a hotel after graduating.

Blake converted to Catholicism after university and was ordained as a priest in May 1981 by Bishop Cormac Murphy-O'Connor. He first worked in Brighton, then moved to St Leonards-on-Sea in 1986, before moving to Egham Hythe in 1991. He lived for a year at Quarr Abbey on the Isle of Wight before moving back to Brighton to become the parish priest at St Mary Magdalen's Church in 2000.

Blake returned the church to its original neo-Gothic design and inaugurated a choir, which increased Mass attendance.

During the early 2000s he started the "Young Adults meeting" which was a weekly Bible and social meeting for adults in their 20s and 30s. The normal template was a prayer, then tea and biscuits, then a reading from the Bible and then discussions.

When Pope Benedict XVI eased restrictions on the Tridentine Mass in the late 2000s, Blake started to use the traditional form more, which encouraged traditional Catholics to attend his church. He established a blog in 2006, which was credited with inspiring other Catholic priests to do the same.

His blog sometimes caused controversy. In 2013, his post describing the poor as "messy" and a beggar who frequented his church as "an irritating little bastard" was criticised by journalists, however his blog argued that the beggar in question disrupted the Mass to beg parishioners for money, and that he was describing his attempts to love all equally according to Christian teaching. He refused to perform Maundy, believing it was "theatre" performed for the priest's own vanity.

After the election of the more theologically liberal Pope Francis in 2013, Blake's blog was considered a refuge for traditional Catholics. However, in 2014 he wrote that the Catholic Church had been increasingly guided by the ideology of each Pope, and this had caused theological apprehension and misunderstanding in churches and dioceses.

Blake retired from active ministry in 2023 and died in 2025.

== Personal life ==
Blake owned one of England's largest private collections of medieval musical instruments. He ran a soup kitchen for the homeless and allowed a refugee to stay at his house without the knowledge of his diocese.
