= Sharada (Malayalam women's magazine) =

Second Malayalam women's magazine

Sharada, the second Malayalam women's magazines to be published in Kerala, was started in November 1904 from Thripunithura, Kochi. Sharada was edited by B. Kalyani Amma, T.C. Kalyani Amma and T. Ammukutty Amma. It was the first women's magazine to be edited by women in Kerala. K. Narayana Menon was the owner of the magazine and it was printed at Bharathi Vilasam Press.

The printing of Sharada came to a stop in three years. It was restarted in the next year from Thiruvananthapuram. Sharada was in print till 1908 under the patronage of K. Ramakrishna Pillai.

After a break, the magazine was restarted in 1913 under the editorship of Kalyani Amma and other women writers and social activists. This time it went on till 1925. This magazine was published by T.K. Kalyanikutty Amma from Punalur. It was different from the original Sharada. Sharada was quite popular for its time with a publication figure of 750 in the 1920s.

Sharada carried articles on social issues and other topics. It was started with the aim to educate and bring about the development of Malayali women.
