= T. C. Kalyani Amma =

Indian writer and editor (1879–1956)

T. C. Kalyani Amma (28 November 1879 – 26 October 1956) was an Indian writer and editor. She was one of the first women editor's and publishers in Malayalam.

Born in Thrissur, she was the daughter of T. C. Ammu, a Sanskrit scholar. Kalyani Amma studied up to matriculation, and in 1896 she married writer, T. K. Krishna Menon. Kalyani Amma was notable in the field of children's literature and translation. She was active in public speaking and became the editor of the women's magazine, Sharada. Aesop's Fables was first introduced to Malayalam by Kalyani Amma.

== Major works ==
=== Children's literature ===
- Aesop's Fables (1897)
- Kadambari Tales (1920)
- Donkey Tales (1909)
- Parables

=== Translations ===
- Poison ivy
- Krishnakanth's death certificate
- Ammarani (Poem) 1899
