= Mary John Thottam =

Indian Catholic nun

- Born: 24 June 1901; Elanji, Ernakulam, Kerala, India
- Died: 20 May 1985 (aged 83); Kerala
- Other name: Mary Benigna
- Occupations: Poet, Catholic nun
- Notable work: Lokame Yathra; Marthoma Vijayam; Kavanamela; Gandhi Jayanthi
- Parents: John Thottam; Mariam
- Awards: Benemerenti medal

Mary John Thottam (24 June 1901 – 20 May 1985), also identified as Sister Mary Benigna, was an Indian Catholic nun and a poet who wrote in Malayalam. She authored two mahakavyas, Marthoma Vijayam and Gandhi Jayanthi, a poetry anthology, Lokame Yathra, and other works. Pope Paul VI honoured her with the Benemerenti medal in 1971.

== Biography ==
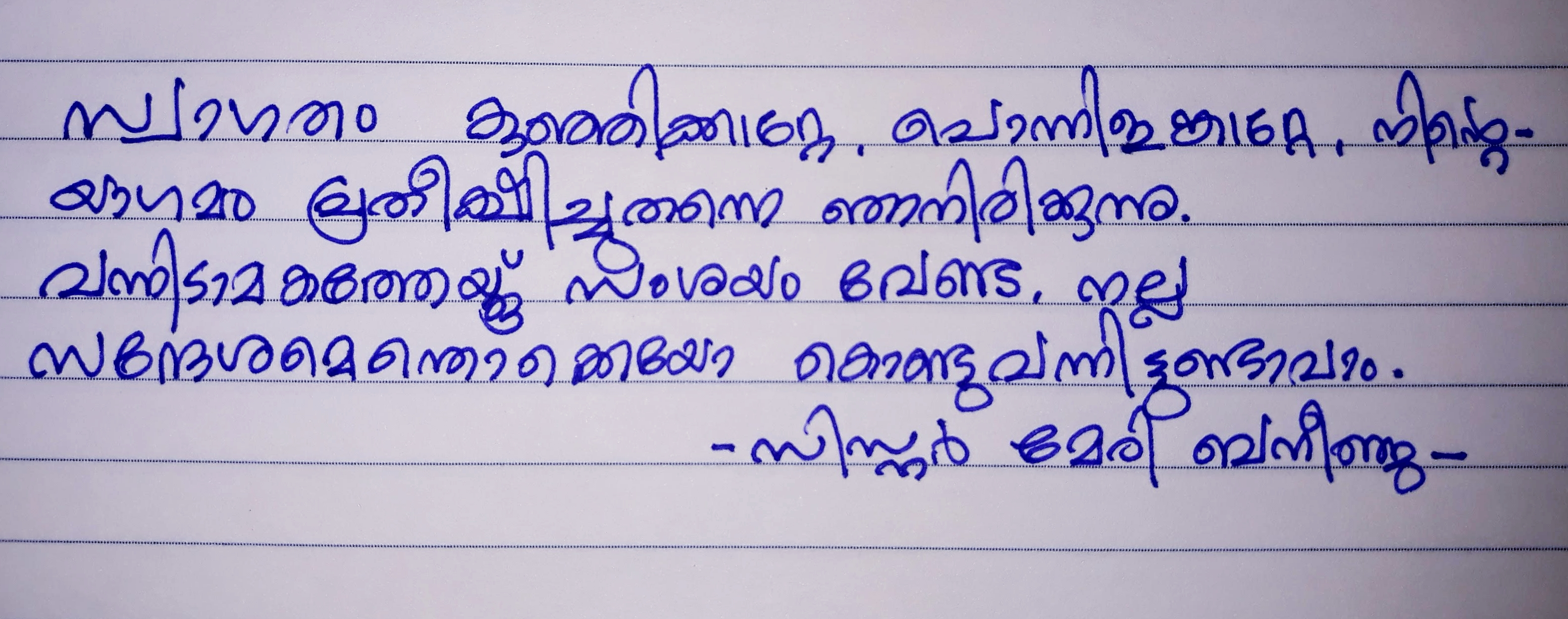
A poem of Sister Mary Benigna

Sister Mary Benigna, née Mary John Thottam, was born on 24 June 1901 at Elanji, a small village near Koothattukulam, in Ernakulam district in the south Indian state of Kerala to John Thottam and Pattasseril Mariam. Her early education was in the traditional way with a local teacher and later she did her formal education at Mutholi Convent School from where she passed the vernacular school leaving certificate (7th standard) to start her career as a teacher at St. Thomas Primary School, North Paravur. She took a break from service after 2 years pursue higher studies in Malayalam and after passing Malayalam higher examination, she returned to Paravur to teach at the English Middle School there. She moved to the Convent Middle School in Kuravilangad in 1922 as a teacher where she became the headmistress the next year.

Thottam's first work, a poetry anthology titled Geethavali, was released in 1927 which had the foreword written by Ulloor S. Parameswara Iyer, the noted poet. This was followed by several works which include two epics viz. Marthoma Vijayam and Gandhi Jayanthi, 10 Khantakavyams and over 350 poems compiled in several anthologies. Besides, she also published four books of prose and a translation. She was one of the pioneers of women writers in Malayalam language and her book, Kavitharamam (A Garden of Poems), published in 1929 sold over 100,000 copies, making it a best seller of the times. Lokame Yatra (Farewell to the World), one of the poems in the anthology, was an autobiographical poem related to her becoming a nun. Pope Paul VI honoured her with the Benemerenti medal in 1971 and she was also honoured by the Catholic Laity Association in 1981.

Thottam entered the Catholic religious order of the Carmelites under the name of Mary Benigna on 16 July 1928 and superannuated from official service in 1961. She died on 20 May 1985, at the age of 83. Dravidian University has established a study centre in honour of Mary John Thottam. Her autobiography, Vanambadi (Nightingale) was published in 1986, a year after her death, along with an anthology of selected poems, under the title, Lokame Yatra.

== Selected bibliography ==
- Thottam, Mary John (1927). Geethavali (in Malayalam). National Book Stall, Kottayam.
- Thottam, Mary John (1928). Lokame Yatra (in Malayalam). Bharananganam, Kōṭṭayaṃ: Jīvan Buks. OCLC 19624885.
- Thottam, Mary John (1929). Kavitharamam (in Malayalam). Kōṭṭayaṃ: Sāhityapr̲avarttaka Sahakaraṇasaṅghaṃ. OCLC 20953037.
- Thottam, Mary John (1934). Easa prasadam (in Malayalam).
- Thottam, Mary John (1936). Cherupushpathinte Balyakala Smaranakal (in Malayalam). Thiruvananthapuram: John Peter Thottam.
- Thottam, Mary John (1936). Vidivaibhavam (in Malayalam).
- Thottam, Mary John (1962). Bharatha Mahalakshmi. Pala: St. Thomas Press.
- Thottam, Mary John (1965). Kavanamēḷa. National Book Stall, Kōṭṭayaṃ.
- Thottam, Mary John (1970). Marthomavijayam. OCLC 39769279.
- Thottam, Mary John (1971). Elanjippoo (in Malayalam). OCLC 978057087.
- Thottam, Mary John (1971). Karayunna Kavithakal (in Malayalam). National Book Stall.
- Thottam, Mary John (1971). Karunya Kavithakal. Kerala Penguin Books. Archived from the original on 24 April 2019.
- Thottam, Mary John (1973). Thottam Kavithakal (in Malayalam). National Book Stall, Kottayam.
- Thottam, Mary John. Kattuparanjakadha. Archived from the original on 25 April 2019.

== See also ==
- List of Malayalam-language authors by category
- List of Malayalam-language authors
- List of Benemerenti medal recipients
