= Avanavanchery Sri Indilayappan Temple =

Hindu temple in Kerala, India

- അവനവഞ്ചേരി ശ്രീ ഇണ്ടിളയപ്പൻ ക്ഷേത്രം
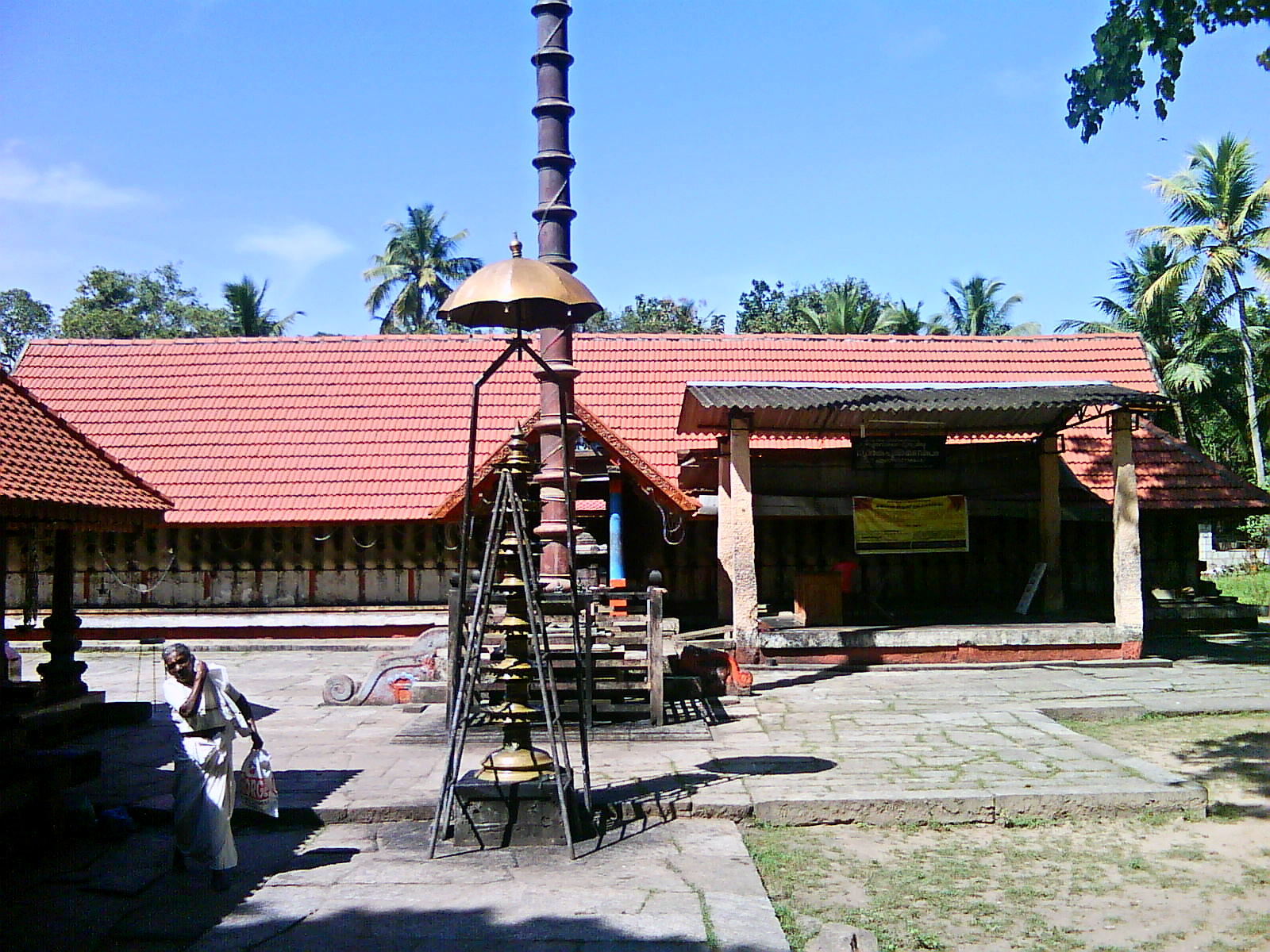

- Sri Indilayyappan Temple, Avanavancherry, Thiruvananthapuram, Kerala

Religion
- Affiliation: Hinduism
- District: Thiruvananthapuram
- Deity: Shiva, Ayyappan, Ganesha
- Festivals: Naivaipp maholsavam and Aavaninchery Pooram

Location
- Location: Indilayappan Temple Road, Avanavancherry, Attingal
- State: Kerala
- Country: India
- Interactive map of Avanavanchery Sri Indilayappan Temple
- Coordinates: 8°41′35.9″N 76°50′03.5″E

Architecture
- Type: Travancore Royal
- Completed: 13th Century
- Elevation: 50.54 m (166 ft)

Website
- aavaninchery.wix.com

Avanavanchery Sri Indilayappan Temple (Malayalam: അവനവഞ്ചേരി ശ്രീ ഇണ്ടിളയപ്പൻ ക്ഷേത്രം) is a popular Hindu temple in Attingal of Thiruvananthapuram district, Kerala. The temple is dedicated to Lord Indilayappan and is one of the oldest temples in the state of Kerala. Lord Indilayappan is worshipped by devotees for getting good health, courage and better life prospects.

The primary deity of the temple is Lord Shiva and Umamaheswara. The Temple sub deities are Lord "Unni Ganapathy" (Baby Ganesha), Sree Dharmashastha (Lord Ayyappan) and Naga Devatas. There is a separate sanctuary for Mallan Thamburan.

== Location ==
The temple is Located in Attingal, Kerala about 3 km South-East of Attingal Town Centre. The temple can be easily reached by Autorickshaws from Attingal Town KSRTC Bus Stand. The nearest major railway station is Varkala Sivagiri. (16 km) The nearest airport is Thiruvananthapuram International Airport. (30 km)
