= St Mary Magdalen's Church, Brighton =

St Mary Magdalen's Church
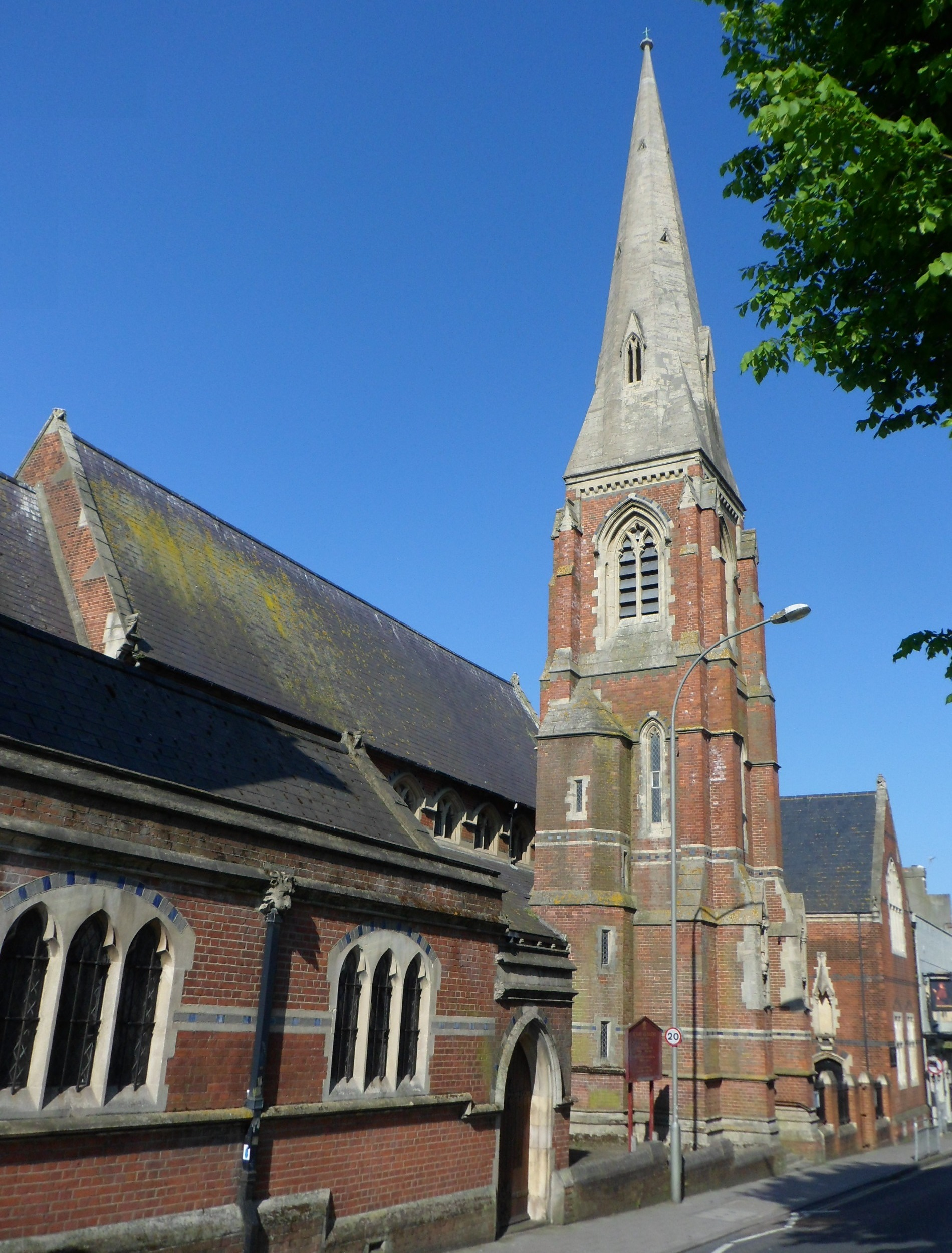
- The church from the northeast, with the parish hall in the distance
- St Mary Magdalen's Church
- 50.8256°N 0.1496°W
- Location: Upper North Street, Montpelier, Brighton and Hove BN1 3FH
- Country: England
- Denomination: Roman Catholic
- Website: https://stmarymagdalenbrighton.blogspot.com/

History
- Status: Parish church
- Founded: 1861
- Dedication: Mary Magdalene

Architecture
- Functional status: Active
- Heritage designation: Grade II listed
- Designated: 10 June 1988
- Architect: Gilbert Blount
- Style: Early English/Decorated Gothic Revival
- Groundbreaking: 1861
- Completed: 16 August 1864

Administration
- Diocese: Arundel and Brighton
- Deanery: Brighton and Hove
- Parish: Brighton, St Mary Magdalen

Clergy
- Priest: Fr Alphonse Kabore

St Mary Magdalen's Church (Note: Some sources incorrectly give the spelling "Magdalene".) is a Roman Catholic church in the Montpelier area of Brighton, part of the English city of Brighton and Hove. Dedicated to Jesus' companion Mary Magdalene, it is one of six Roman Catholic churches in Brighton and one of eleven in the city area. Built by ecclesiastical architect Gilbert Blount in a 13th-century Gothic style to serve the rapidly expanding residential area on the border of Brighton and Hove, it has been listed at Grade II by English Heritage in view of its architectural importance. An adjacent presbytery and parish hall have been listed separately at Grade II.

== History ==
Brighton had only one Roman Catholic place of worship until 1861: St John the Baptist's Church, built in 1835 in the Kemptown area to replace an earlier building. A mission district was established to serve West Brighton, and priest Fr George Oldham was responsible for planning a church to serve it. Gilbert Blount, who entered the field of ecclesiastical architecture (specialising in Roman Catholic churches) after an earlier career as an engineer working alongside Isambard Kingdom Brunel, was commissioned to design it.

The first part of the church to be built was the sanctuary and its adjoining chapels, which were finished in 1861. The first part of the nave was added in 1862; this was then extended in 1864, when the spire was also built. The official opening date was 16 August 1864. No significant work was carried out for many years, but in 1962 the original organ was replaced and two statues carved by Joseph Cribb, a pupil of Eric Gill, were installed above the entrance. These depicted Saints Joseph and George. More internal work was carried out between 1973 and 1974.

Upper North Street, on which the church stands, was developed from the 1830s onwards with high-quality housing; it connects Brighton with Hove. The church stands on the south side between the separate presbytery to the east and the former primary school, also dedicated to St Mary Magdalen, to the west. The school dates from around 1865 and is of red brick, stone and some black brick (for example, on the arched window heads). It has been converted into a church hall, and was listed at Grade II on 19 March 1997. The presbytery is a later building, dating from about 1890, but is in a similar style with red brick walls, stone dressings and window surrounds and a slate roof. It stands on a corner site, and one part of the roof is gabled and the other is hipped. It was listed at Grade II on 10 June 1988.

The church is licensed for worship in accordance with the Places of Worship Registration Act 1855 and has the registration number 14463.

== Architecture ==
The church is a 13th-century Early English/Decorated Gothic-style building—a design favoured by Gilbert Blount for his churches. He used red brick, laid out in an English bond pattern, for the exterior walls; there are decorative dressings of blue and black brick, and larger areas of stonework. The brick and stone tower tapers in three stages and is topped with a spire of stone. The layout consists of a chancel, five-bay nave, aisles, vestry and the tower in which a porch and the entrance door are incorporated. There are lancet windows with ornate tracery on all sides and on the middle and upper stages of the tower. The stone dressings on the exterior have intricate carvings.

== The church today ==
St Mary Magdalen's Church was listed at Grade II by English Heritage on 10 June 1988. It is one of 1,124 Grade II-listed buildings and structures, and 1,218 listed buildings of all grades, in the city of Brighton and Hove.

Some reconstruction of the sanctuary led by Father Ray Blake took place between 2008 and 2010, together with new decorative lighting, restoring the church to an appearance closer to that previous to re-ordering which had taken place following the liturgical changes after the Second Vatican Council.

The church is one of eleven Roman Catholic churches in Brighton and Hove. There are five others in Brighton, three in Hove and one each in Rottingdean and Woodingdean.

Hugh Gerard McGrellis (known as Gerry) has been an altar server at the church for over 70 years and was awarded the Benemerenti medal by Pope Benedict XVI in recognition of his services. He has also served as the Chair of Governors for some time at St Mary Magdalen's School.

== See also ==
- Grade II listed buildings in Brighton and Hove: S
- List of places of worship in Brighton and Hove
- Media related to St Mary Magdalen's Church, Brighton at Wikimedia Commons

== Bibliography ==
- Carder, Timothy (1990). The Encyclopaedia of Brighton. Lewes: East Sussex County Libraries. ISBN 0-86147-315-9.
- Dale, Antony (1989). Brighton Churches. London: Routledge. ISBN 0-415-00863-8.
- Elleray, D. Robert (2004). Sussex Places of Worship. Worthing: Optimus Books. ISBN 0-9533132-7-1.
