= Auntie Maria School =

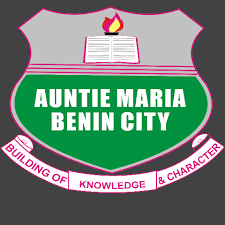

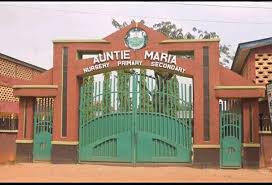

Location
- 10, First Avenue, Garrick Residential Estate, Siluko Road; Benin City, Edo State, South South; Nigeria
- Coordinates: 6.350432°N 5.601233°E

Information
- Type: Private Nursery, Primary & Secondary School
- Motto: Building of Knowledge and Character
- Established: 1974
- Founder: Dame Maria Amieriye Osunde
- Teaching staff: over 50
- Mixed: Mixed
- Enrollment: over 500
- Houses: Green, Blue, Yellow and Red
- Colours: Green and Pink
- Accreditation: Ministry of Education, Nigeria
- Newspaper: Auntie Maria
- Yearbook: Auntie Maria

Auntie Maria School (AMS) is located in Benin City, Nigeria and comprises Auntie Maria Nursery School (Toddler 1 - KG 2); Auntie Maria Primary School (Basics 1 - 5); and Auntie Maria College (JSS 1 - 3 & SSS1 - 3). The institution was founded in 1974 by Dame Maria Amieriye Osunde.

== Bibliography ==
- Osunde, A. M., The Teacher My Memoirs, Benin, 2005.
