= Attingal =

- Municipality-Thiruvananthapuram Metropolitan Area
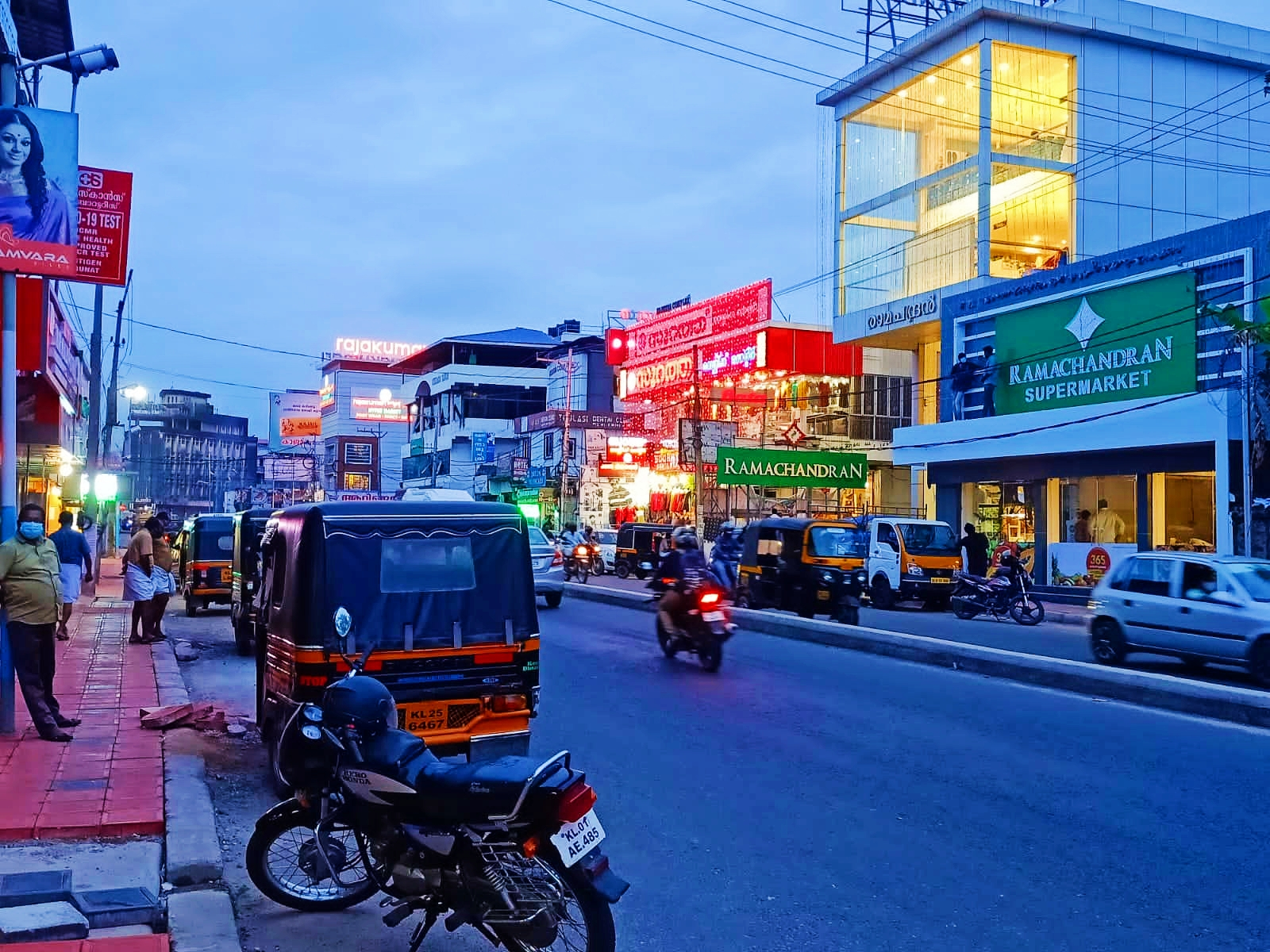
- Attingal Municipal Town

- Location within Kerala Location within India
- Coordinates: 8°41′53.546″N 76°48′49.173″E
- Country: India
- State: Kerala
- District: Thiruvananthapuram

Government
  - Type: Government of Kerala
  - Body: Attingal Municipality
  - MP: Adoor Prakash

Area
  - Total: 16.87 km^{2} (6.51 sq mi)
  - Rank: 4th
- Elevation: 23 m (75 ft)

Population (2011)
  - Total: 37,648
  - Rank: 4th
  - Density: 2,232/km^{2} (5,780/sq mi)
- Demonym: Attingalkaran

Languages
  - Official: Malayalam
- Time zone: UTC+5:30 (IST)
- PIN: 695101-695104
- Telephone code: 0470
- Vehicle registration: KL-16

Attingal KSRTC bus stand

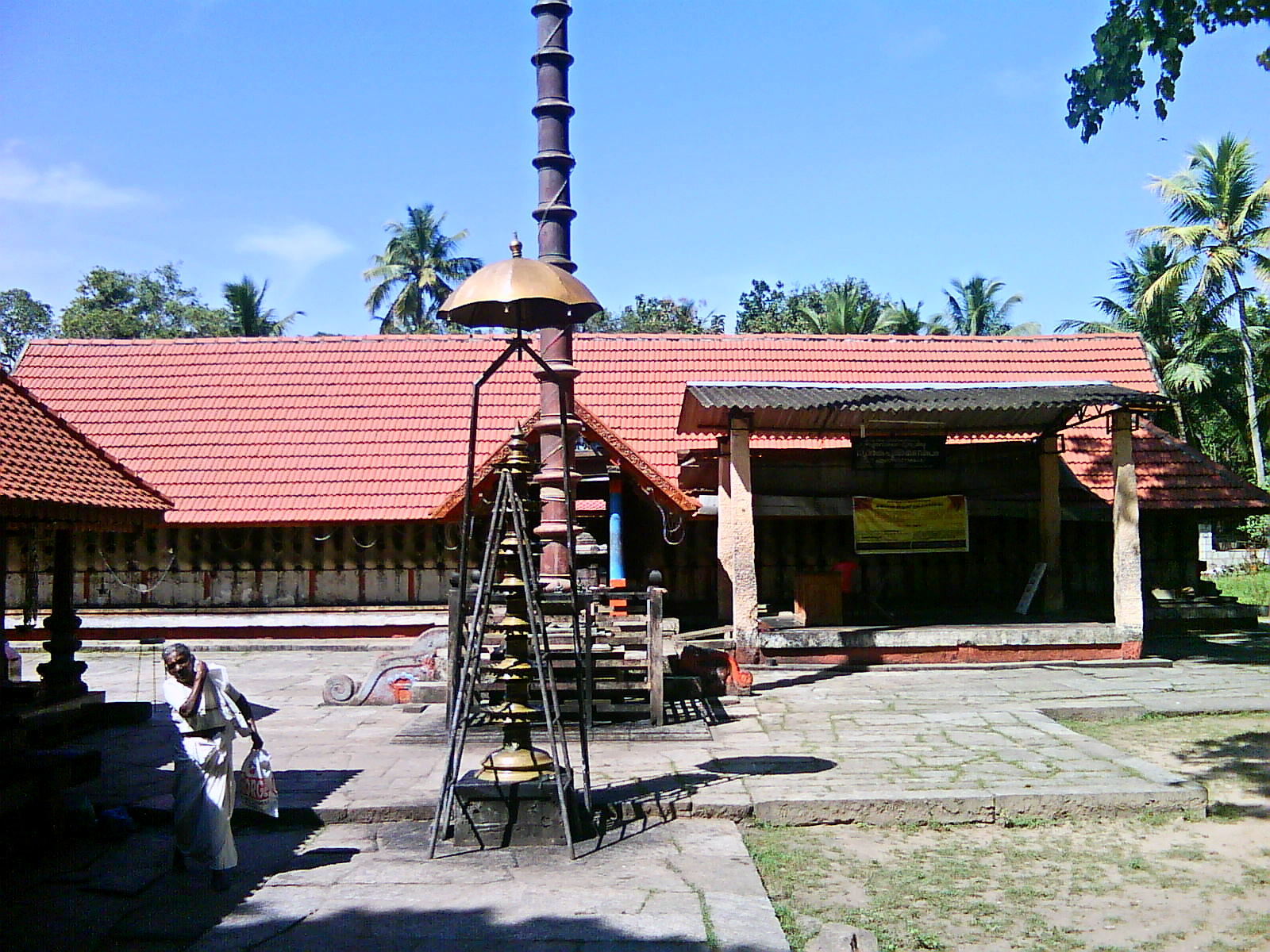
Avanavanchery Sri Indilayappan Temple

Attingal is a municipality and a northern suburb of the Thiruvananthapuram Metropolitan Area, Kerala, India. It is the maternal home and ancestral residence of the Travancore Royal Family (Venad), and was ruled by the female royals (Attingal Ranis) as Attingal Thirumoopil Swaroopam under Travancore.

It is the headquarters of Chirayinkeezhu Taluk, and the important government institutions of the taluk such as the Taluk office, Court Complex, Office of the Deputy Superintendent of Police, Civil Station, and treasuries are situated in Attingal. It is one of the oldest municipalities in Kerala, having been constituted prior to Indian independence in 1924. In 1914, the Attingal Town Improvement Authority (TIA) was formed, operating under that name until the Travancore Municipality Regulation Act of 1922 formally established the Attingal Municipality. Attingal town is located 30 kilometres (19 mi) north of Thampanoor, the city centre, and is the third most densely populated municipality in the district.

== Etymology ==
Attingal is widely believed to have derived its name from “Attinkara,” meaning “river banks,” referring to the Vamanapuram River that flows along the northern and southern boundaries of the municipality at Mamom and Poovanpara.

== Demographics ==
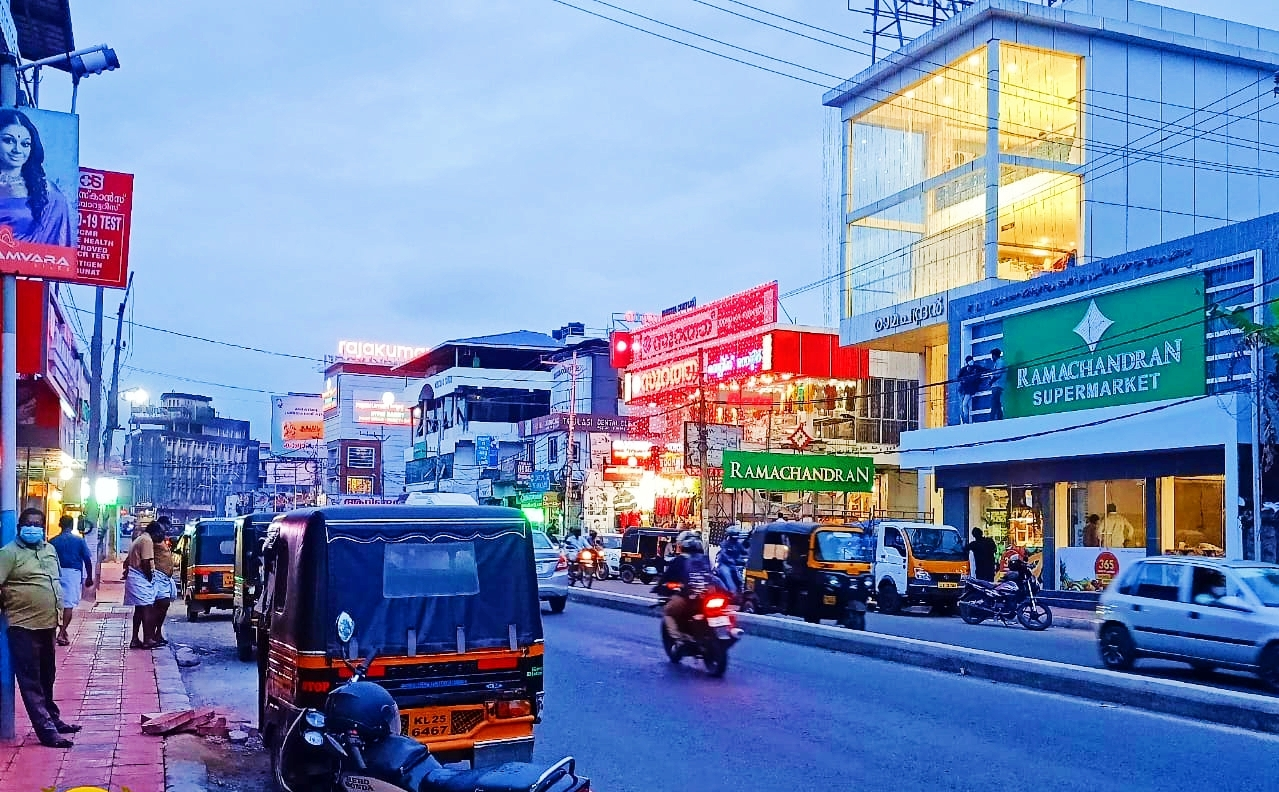
NH 66 at Attingal

According to the 2011 census, Attingal has a population of 37,346. Males constitute 17,009 of the population and females 20,337.

According to 2011 Census data projected to 2026, the Attingal Municipality boasts a high average literacy rate of 96.65%, which is significantly higher than the Kerala state average of 94%. Male literacy in the town is approximately 97.71%, while female literacy is recorded at 95.77%. The town is famed for its cleanliness in recent years. The municipality has undertaken many plans which have been successful. The municipality has also achieved a couple of awards for its success.

== History ==
The Attingal and Anchuthengu uprisings (Kalapam) were the first major revolts against the British East India Company in Kerala. The Anchuthengu revolt occurred in 1697 over disputes regarding the British pepper trade, marking the first uprising against the British in Kerala. Subsequently, the Attingal Outbreak took place in 1721 as the first organized revolt against British rule in the region, which was later settled through an agreement with Venad.

== Politics ==
The Attingal assembly constituency is part of Attingal (Lok Sabha constituency).

In the Attingal Lok Sabha constituency election, United Democratic Front (UDF) candidate Adv. Adoor Prakash was elected as the Member of Parliament. In the 2026 Attingal Legislative Assembly election, Left Democratic Front (LDF) candidate O. S. Ambika was elected as the Member of the Legislative Assembly (MLA). The Left Democratic Front (LDF) is the ruling coalition in the Attingal Municipality, led by CPI(M) leader M. Pradeep, who serves as the municipal chairperson. The LDF emerged as the largest coalition in the municipal council elections and subsequently retained control of the local body administration.

== Tourism ==
=== Attingal Palace ===
Koyikkal Palace is the maternal home of the Travancore royal family. The great rulers of the kingdom, including Anizham Thirunal Marthanda Varma, were brought up in this palace situated at Kollampuzha, Attingal. The palace, built in stone and wood, according to Kerala architecture stands in a nearly 10-acre wide plot, a portion of which is privately owned now. The palace has four temples inside it, including the 700-year-old sanctorum that houses the Palliyara Bhagavathy. The temple of the family deity, Thiruvarattukavu Devi, is also seated in a temple inside the palace complex. The historically important palace, built in an 'ettukettu' structure. The temples and the palace is currently under the control of the Devaswom Board. One of the entrance gates here, ' Chavadipura', was reconstructed recently by the royal family.

=== Anchuthengu Fort ===
The historical fort of Anchuthengu is about 10 km from Attingal town

=== Avanavanchery Sri Indilayappan Temple ===
Avanavanchery Sri Indilayappan Temple and Veerakeralapuram Sreekrishna Swami Temple are within the Attingal Municipal area.

=== Kumaran Ashan Smarakam ===
The memorial museum dedicated to Kerala renaissance leader and poet Kumaran Asan, situated in Thonnakkal near Attingal, preserves his thatched-roof home and exhibits his literary works and personal belongings.

== Transport ==
Attingal is one of the important hubs of the Thiruvananthapuram district. Kanyakumari-Panvel Highway(National Highway 66 (India)) along with SH 46 and SH 47 connecting the town to Kilimanoor and Nedumangadu, passes through the town.SH46 joins the Town at Alamcode and SH47 at Munumukku. Both KSRTC and private buses have frequent services to nearby towns like Varkala, Kilimanoor, Kallambalam, Chirayinkeezhu, Kadakkavoor, Venjarammoodu, Nedumangad, Karette, Vamanapuram, Madathara, including back-to-back Electric Buses and City Shuttle buses between Technopark, Airport, Medical College and East Fort. There are also long distance buses to nearly all major cities in Kerala including Kollam, Ernakulam, Kozhikode, Thrissur, Malappuram, etc. The nearest railway stations are Chirayinkeezhu Railway station (7 km), Kadakkavoor Railway station (8 km), and Kazhakkottam Railway Station (15km), with the closest major railway station being Varkala Sivagiri Railway Station (15 km). Thiruvananthapuram International Airport (33 km) is the nearest airport. Two dedicated bus depots are available in the forms of a Kerala State Road Transport Corporation(KSRTC) bus depot which is one among the 28 Main depots of KSRTC and one Private Bus Terminal, both in the heart of the town. A bypass as part of NH66 6-laning is being constructed that diverts from Mamom and ends at Ayamkonam, that completely avoids the Attingal Municipality limits to reduce traffic bottlenecks. Attingal has been a large traffic bottleneck in Thiruvananthapuram especially on NH66.

== Notable people ==
- K. Chinnamma, social worker and founder of Hindu Mahila Mandiram
- Prem Nazir, film actor
- G. K. Pillai (actor), film actor
- Kumaran Asan, poet
- Marthanda Varma, Travancore King
- Umayamma Rani, Senior Rani of Attingal and Regent of Travancore
- Bharat Gopy, Film Actor (also producer and director)
- Murali Gopy, Film Actor (also screenwriter, author, singer, and former journalist)
- Sukumar (writer)

== Education ==
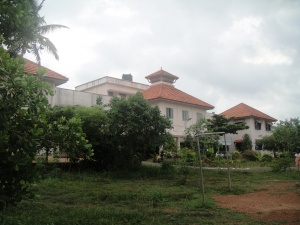
College of Engineering, Attingal

Regular Educational institutions include:

- College of Engineering(IHRD), Attingal
- Government College, Attingal
- District Institute of Education and Training, Attingal
- Rajadhani Institute of Engineering and Technology, Nagaroor, Attingal
- Government Polytechnic college, Attingal
- Government ITI, Attingal
- Government Model Higher secondary and vocational higher secondary school, Attingal
- Government Town UP school, Attingal
- Government High School Avanavanchery, Attingal
- Government Girls HSS, Attingal
- Trivandrum International School, Edackode PO, Korani, Attingal
- Sr. Elizabeth Joel CSI EM HSS, Attingal
- NAVABHARATH HIGHER SECONDARY SCHOOL
- Christ Nagar Public School (CBSE)
- Jyothis Public School ( CBSE), Attingal.
- Amrita Model EM School, Attingal

== Transportation ==
• KSRTC Bus Station, Attingal

• Private Bus Stand, Attingal

• Railway Station, Kadakavur(KVU) (10 km) and Chirayinkeezhu(CRY) (11 km)

• International and Domestic Airport, Trivandrum (30 km)
