= M. Haleema Beevi =

Indian journalist

- Born: 1918
- Died: 14 January 2000 (aged 81–82)
- Occupations: Publisher, Writer, Editor
- Known for: Journalism, Social Reform, Islamic Feminism
- Spouse: K.M. Mohammed Moulavi

M. Haleema Beevi (1918–2000) was an Indian journalist, social activist, freedom fighter, Islamic feminist, newspaper editor and publisher. She has the unique position of being the proprietor of three women’s periodicals and a general magazine in Kerala. Haleema Beevi was also the president of the Thiruvalla Muslim Women’s Association and an active member of the Muslim Majlis.

She worked as a Municipal Councilor at Thiruvalla, Kerala between 1938 and 1945 and was the first Muslim woman to hold that position.

== Personal life ==
Haleema Beevi was born in Adoor in present-day Pathanamthitta district of Kerala in 1918. Her parents were Peer Mohammed and Maideen Beevi. She lost her father at a young age. Maiteen Beevi, a mother of seven, raised her children alone, including Haleema Beevi. Two of the seven children died at a very young age. She and her sister were sent to school, contrary to the custom in their locality. Halima Beevi testified in an interview published in Chandrika Weekly that when her elder sister was sent to school in Adoor, it was strongly opposed by conservative religious thinkers and that her mother did not care. Despite the protests, the mother sent Halima Beevi also to school and called out to the world for her courage and determination. She was able to study till Class 7.

== Publications ==
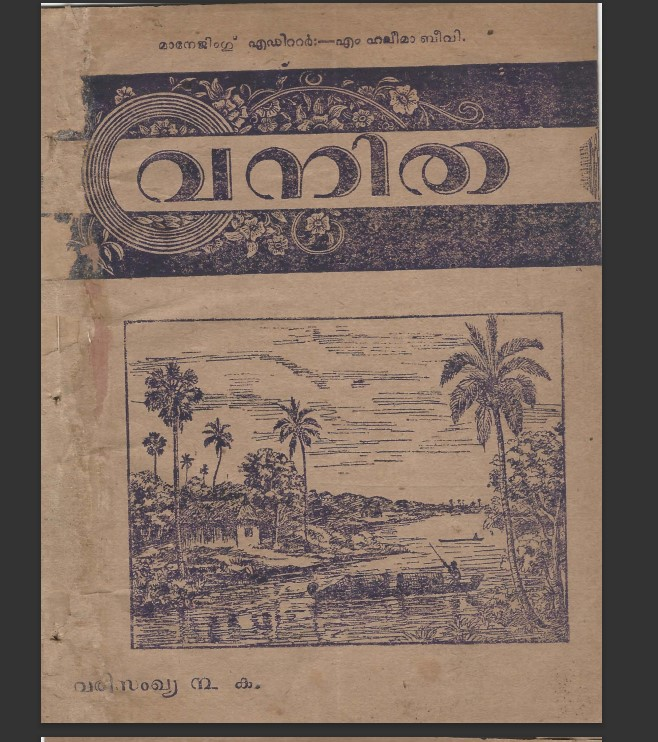
Vanitha Magazine (September 1944) cover page

She started the Muslim Vanitha in 1938 at the age of eighteen. It was printed from Thiruvalla and later moved to Kodungalloor. The magazine had to be stopped due to objections from conservative groups among the local Muslims and a lack of finances. She started a general weekly called the Bharatachandrika in 1944. This was turned into a daily in 1946. The newspaper and weekly had prominent women and men as writers and sub-editors including Vaikom Muhammed Basheer, N. Balamani amma, P. Kesavadev, Thakazhi Sivasankara Pillai, G. Sankara Kurup, M.P. Appan, P. Kunhiraman Nair, O.N.V. Kurup, S. Guptan Nair, etc. She was the printer, publisher and editor for this periodical. Once Bharatachandrika was converted to a daily, it ran into financial difficulties. Concurrently, she started a women’s magazine called The Vanitha (1944). In 1970, she started another magazine called Adhunika Vanitha. This magazine also was unsuccessful.

She used to contribute articles related to Islam in the Al Manar magazine.

== Activism ==
While a religious preaching was going on in the village, a religious scholar gave his own definition to education that Islam does not give. Haleema Beevi and her friends stood up from the audience and questioned the scholar and went down with some women after saying everything she had to say. Before leaving, Beevi challenged that those who could preach Islam cleanly would be preached in the same place the next day. From the next day onwards, K.M. Mohammad Moulavi, Aslam Moulavi, M. Abdul Salam IAS and others preached. This incident in the life of Halima Beevi, had a great impact on the Muslim history of Kerala.

During the reign of Dewan C.P. Ramaswamy, when printing presses and newspapers were running into trouble, she learnt printing, composing and binding. She used to print leaflets and other materials for those protesting against the rule of the dewan. M. Haleema Beevi and her husband helped with the composing and printing of articles and leaflets for the Malayala Manorama when that newspaper came into conflict with the government. Sir C.P. Ramaswamy had offered her a job if she would be ready to give up her political career.

She had been jailed for her ideals and taking part in the Vimochana samaram.

She worked tirelessly for the emancipation of women, specifically Muslim women. She wanted to bring Muslim women to mainstream society. She had fairly radical ideas that were rooted in her Islamic heritage. She wrote and spoke about including subjects such as health, psychology and Quran in the educational syllabus.

== Family and death ==
Haleema Beevi was married to K.M. Mohammed Moulavi when she was sixteen years old. Her husband encouraged her in her public activities. He was himself a writer, editor and religious scholar. Their children are Ansar Begum, Nafisa Beevi, Jameela Beevi, retired headmistress of Paringkanni UPS School Mohammad Ashraf, General Manager, CIDCO, Thiruvananthapuram and late. Ayesha. After the death of Mohammad Moulavi in 1992, Halima Beevi completely withdrew from public life. She later lived in Perumbavoor with her daughter Nafisa Beevi. She died on 14 January 2000.
