= B. Kalyani Amma =

Indian writer (1883–1959)

- Born: 22 February 1883; Thiruvananthapuram
- Died: 9 October 1959 (aged 76)
- Occupations: Writer, Editor, Teacher, Social Reformer
- Notable work: Ormayil Ninnum, Vyazhavatta Smaranakal, Mahathikal, Veettilum Purathum, Arogya Shastram, Arogya Shastravum Grihabharanavum
- Spouse: Swadeshabhimani K. Ramakrishna Pillai

B. Kalyani Amma (22 February 1883 – 9 October 1959) was a writer, editor, teacher and social reformer from Kerala. Kalyani Amma's most notable work is Vyazhavatta Smaranakal (Memories of a Cycle of Twelve Years) and Ormayil Ninnum (Reminiscences). She was one of the editors of two of the earliest magazines published for women in Kerala, Sharada and Malayalamasika. Kalyani Amma was the wife of Swadeshabhimani K. Ramakrishna Pillai, a political writer, journalist and editor.

== Early life and education ==
B. Kalyani Amma lived in the erstwhile princely state of Travancore during the turn of the century. She was born in Kuzhivilaakathu House, Kuthiravattom, Thiruvananthapuram, on 22 February 1883. She was the daughter of Subbraayan Bhatt and Bhagavathy Amma. She belonged to a traditional Nair family. She completed her matriculation in a Zenana Mission School with financial help from missionaries who taught and ran the school. The school where she studied did not officially have a high school. The school authorities engaged tutors to teach her and two other friends.

She was married off before she could complete her F.A. (equivalent to the current pre-university or Grade 11 and 12). Her husband encouraged her to complete her education and she pursued higher education after her marriage to Ramakrishna Pillai.

== Personal life ==
Kalyani Amma knew Ramakrishna Pillai before their marriage. Their marriage was held against the wishes of her family as the horoscopes (which was important in a Hindu marriage), of Kalyani Amma and Ramakrishna Pillai, did not match. The marriage took place in 1904. Her married life was unusual in the strong bond she shared with her husband, which was not the case in early twentieth-century Kerala.

When Ramakrishna Pillai was banished by the Travancore government, she followed her husband with their two young children. She gave up her teaching job and moved to Malabar with him. Both of them were hosted by Tharavath Ammalu Amma, another well-known writer, intellectual and the first woman dramatist from Kerala, at Palghat. She acted as a foster mother to the couple.

== Later life ==
Kalyani Amma continued her education in Madras after Ramakrishna Pillai was banished. She completed her BA Degree in Philosophy and did a teacher training course also. She started teaching in a school in Kannur, Malabar and the family moved with her. She later moved on to a school in Mangalore. Ramakrishna Pillai had contracted Tuberculosis while they were in Malabar. She took care of him until his death in 1916. She retired as a Headmistress in 1937 and stayed on in Malabar instead of moving to her ancestral home in Travancore.

== Literary achievements ==
Kalyani Amma took on editing and writing for Malayalamasika during her stay in Malabar. She had been writing and editing for Sharada while in Travancore. Both the magazines had articles on women's education, health, social reform, etc. Kalyani Amma was a regular contributor to various other magazines also. Ormayil Ninnum (Reminiscences), Vyazhavatta Smaranakal (Memories of a Cycle of Twelve Years), Mahathikal (Great Women), Thamarassery, Karmaphalam (Fruits of One's Actions), Veettilum Purathum (The Home and Outside; a translation of Tagore's The Home and the World), Arogya Shastram (The Science of Health), Arogya Shastravum Grihabharanavum (Health Science and Household Management) are her documented books.

Ormayil Ninnum, her autobiography, is an enlightening read on the social customs, untouchability related practices, and life for a woman during the early twentieth century in Kerala. She was a well-known figure in the literary and social sphere. She left the manuscript of the book with her friend, Tharavath Amminni Amma because she knew that journalists would hound her daughter for her story after her death.

Vyazhavatta Smaranakal is her most popular book. It portrays her life with Ramakrishna Pillai, which lasted for twelve years until his death. The 1998 edition of Vyazhavatta Smaranakal was published by DC Books, Kottayam, containing introductory remarks by Tharavath Ammalu Amma (14.12.1916). Tharavath Ammalu Amma's preface comparing Kalyani Amma to Sita following an exiled Rama into the forest set the tone for the reception of the book. The book went on to have more than thirteen editions since it was first published in 1916.

Mahathikal is purported to have been prescribed as a textbook in the princely state of Cochin.

Kalyani Amma was one of the well-known early contributors to women's magazines from Kerala. She wrote on various subjects like women's health, education, home management, and so on. She was interested in bringing about social and communal reform in early twentieth-century Kerala. Her autobiography is one of the few existing personal documentation on how untouchability and caste system worked in that period in Kerala from the point of view of a Nair.
