= Tharavath Ammalu Amma =

Indian writer and translator

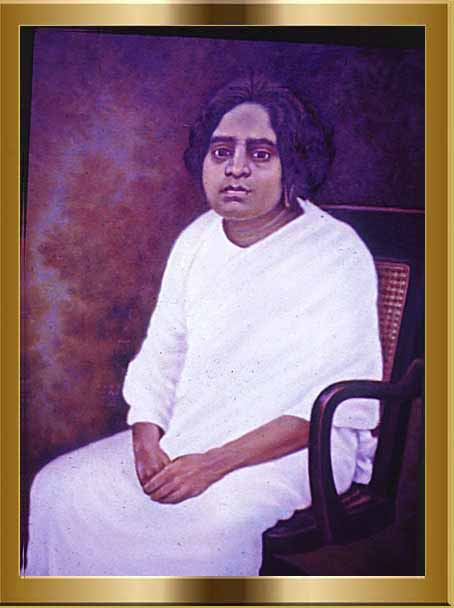
- Ammalu Amma
- Born: 26 April 1873; British India
- Died: 6 June 1936 (aged 63)
- Occupations: Translator, novelist

Tharavath Ammalu Amma was a Malayalam language writer and translator born in Madras presidency, British India (present-day Kerala, India). She translated many works from Sanskrit and Tamil to Malayalam.

Ammalu Amma's 1914 novel Kamalabhai Athava Lakshmivilasathile Kolapathakam (Kamalabhai or the murder at Lakshmivilasam) was the first detective novel written by a woman in Malayalam. She was the only writer who was refused the "Sahitya Sakhi", the highest literary award in the then Kingdom of Cochin.

== Biography ==
Ammalu Amma was born on 26 April 1873, in the Tharavath family of present-day Palakkad district, Kerala to Tharavath Kumminiamma and Chinchamveetil Shankaran Nair who was a tehsildar. Tharavath Ammalu Amma's ancestors came from Malabar to Palakkad Parali during Tipu Sultan's invasion. She had one brother, doctor T. M. Nair. She was taught letters and elementary lessons by a native teacher. Along with this, she also studied Sanskrit and music at home. After that she started learning mathematics and later Tamil language from his father.

She was well versed in Malayalam, Sanskrit and Tamil. The Maharaja of Cochin was willing to grant the "Sahitya Sakhi" award to her, but she rejected it. She was the only writer who was refused the "Sahitya Sakhi", the highest literary award in the then Kingdom of Cochin.

She died on 6 June 1936.

=== Personal life ===
Ammalu Amma married thrice. She was married first at the age of 15. Her first husband, who was the lord of Punnathur Kovilakam, left her after the birth of two children. Due to her mother's insistence, she married Krishna Varyar of Ramapuram, who was a physician, for the second time. Warrier died shortly after having three daughters. Many of the children of the first two marriages died at various times, leaving only two daughters. The third marriage was to Unnikrishna Varyar of Vadakkumtara Varyath.

== Literary career ==
Ammalu Amma's 1914 novel Kamalabhai Athava Lakshmivilasathile Kolapathakam (Kamalabhai or the murder at Lakshmivilasam) was the first detective novel written by a woman in Malayalam. Ammalu Amma's travelogue Oru Tirtha Yatra, a work published by the Norman Printing Press in Kozhikode in 1925, is an account of the holy temples and places visited by her when she went to Varanasi with the mortal remains of her brother T. M. Nair in 1921. Other original works are Chandrika, Balabodhini, Krishna Bhakti, Komalavalli (2 volume), Bhakthamalayile cheukathakal (short stories of Bhakthamala) etc. Some of these have been textbooks in the past.

As translator she introduced many works of Sanskrit, Tamil and English languages to Malayalam. She was a Buddhist devotee, and the biography of Buddha, The Light of Asia was translated by her into Malayalam as Buddha Gatha. She also translated the Sanskrit works like Sarva Vedanta Sidhantha Sara Samgraham and Shiva Bhaktha Vilasam into Malayalam. Krishna Bhakti Chandrika, published in 1912, is a translation of a Sanskrit short play. Bhakthamala (3 volume) published in 1907 is a translation of Sanskrit work with the same name. Sri Shankaravijayam was a Tamil work translated into Malayalam in 1928 at the request of Kumbakonam Shankaracharyaswamy's disciples. Leela published in 1911 is a translation of a Tamil novel.

Ammalu Amma presided over the meetings of the state level literary organisation Sahitya Parishad in 1929 and 1930.

== Activism ==
Ammalu Amma made a place in the history of Travancore by offering shelter to Swadeshabhimani Ramakrishna Pillai and his family when Pillai was deported from Travancore by then king of Travancore Shri Moolam Thirunal.

Ammalu Amma, who was also a feminist and woman egalitarian, called for women to give importance to literary taste as much as or more than men. Once, in an essay on Sthreekalude Sahithyavasana (Women's literary taste) published in Lakshmi Bhai magazine, she wrote as follows, "I know some people are sceptical that women have a taste for literature. But I would say that the very essence of literature is in every woman".
