= Benemerenti medal =

Papal award

Benemerenti Medal
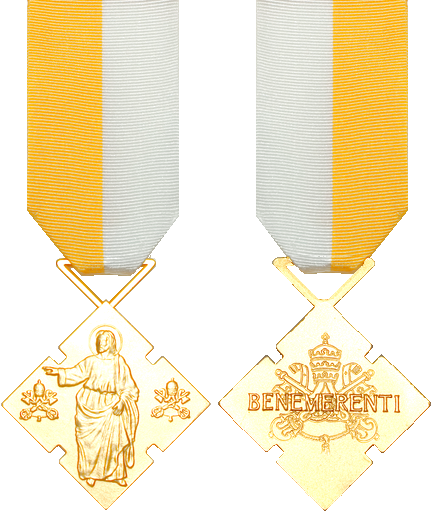
- Obverse and reverse of the medal
- Awarded for: Long (>3 years) and exceptional service to the Catholic Church
- Country: Holy See
- Presented by: Pope Leo XIV
- Eligibility: Clergy and laity
- Status: Active
- Established: 1832
- Ribbon of the medal

Precedence
- Next (higher): Pro Ecclesia et Pontifice
- Next (lower): Lateran Cross; Jerusalem Pilgrim's Cross

The Benemerenti Medal (Italian: Croce pro Benemerenti, lit. 'Cross for Meritorious [Service]') is a medal awarded by the Pope to members of the clergy and laity for service to the Catholic Church. Originally established as an award for soldiers in the Papal Army, it is now a civil decoration but may still be awarded to members of the Pontifical Swiss Guard.

== History ==
The Benemerenti Medal was first awarded by Pope Pius VI (1775–1799) as a military decoration. In 1831 under Pope Gregory XVI (r. 1831–1846) a special Benemerenti medal was struck to reward those who fought courageously in the Papal army at Ferrara, Bologna, and Vienna.

In 1925, the concept of awarding this medal as a mark of recognition to persons in service of the Catholic Church, both civil and military, lay and clergy alike, became acceptable. Members of the Swiss Guard may receive it for three years of faithful service.

== Appearance ==
The current version of the Benemerenti medal was designed by Pope Paul VI. The medal is a gold Greek Cross depicting Christ with his hand raised in blessing. On the left arm of the cross is the tiara and crossed keys symbol of the papacy. On the right arm is the coat of arms of the current Pope. The medal is suspended from a yellow and white ribbon, the colors of the Papacy.

Previous versions and variants consisted mainly of a round medal with the portrait of the reigning Pope on the front and a laurel wreath with an inscription "BENEMERENTI" or "BENE MERENTI" on the back.

== Gallery ==
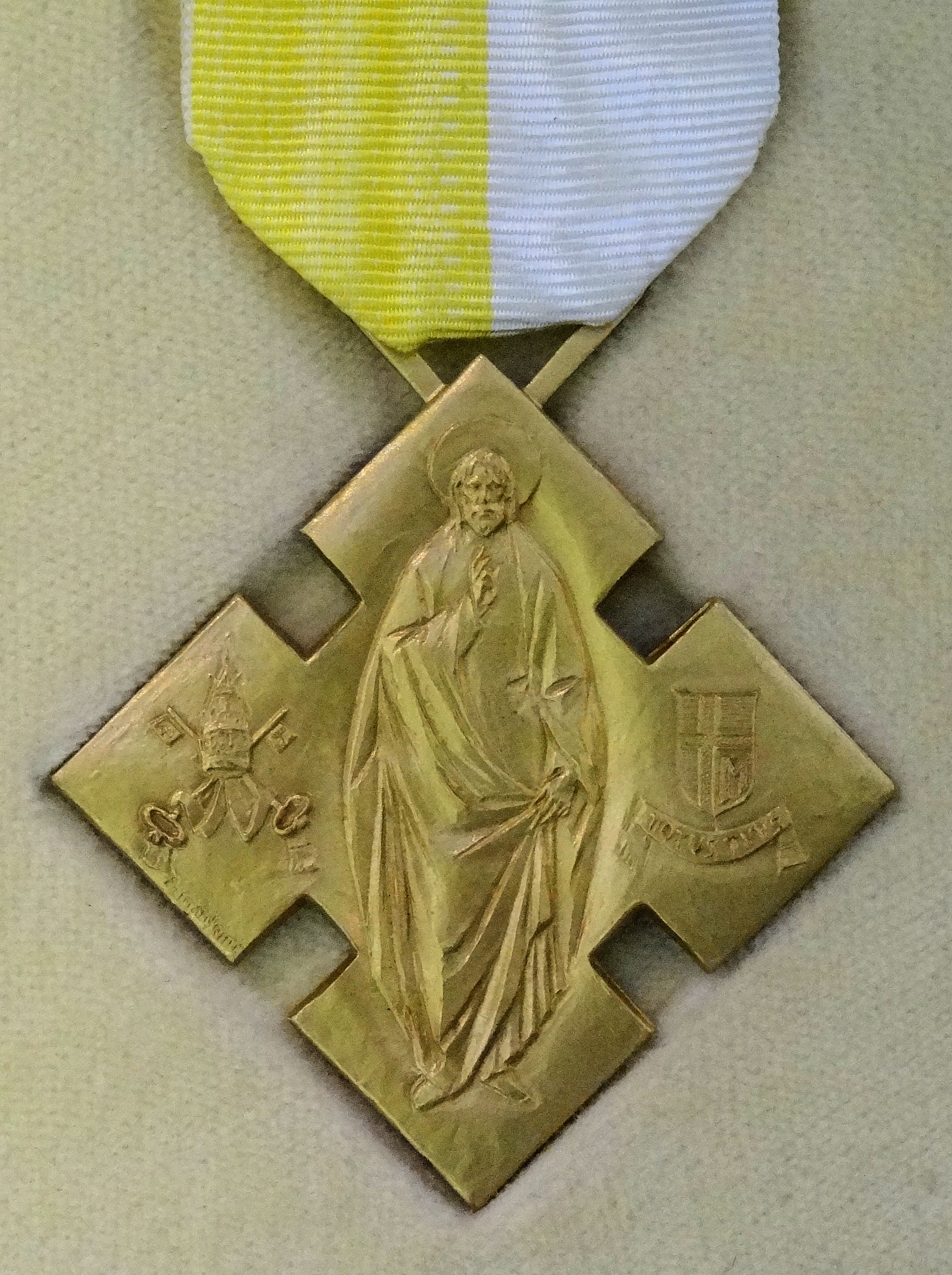
Benemerenti Medal (1984)

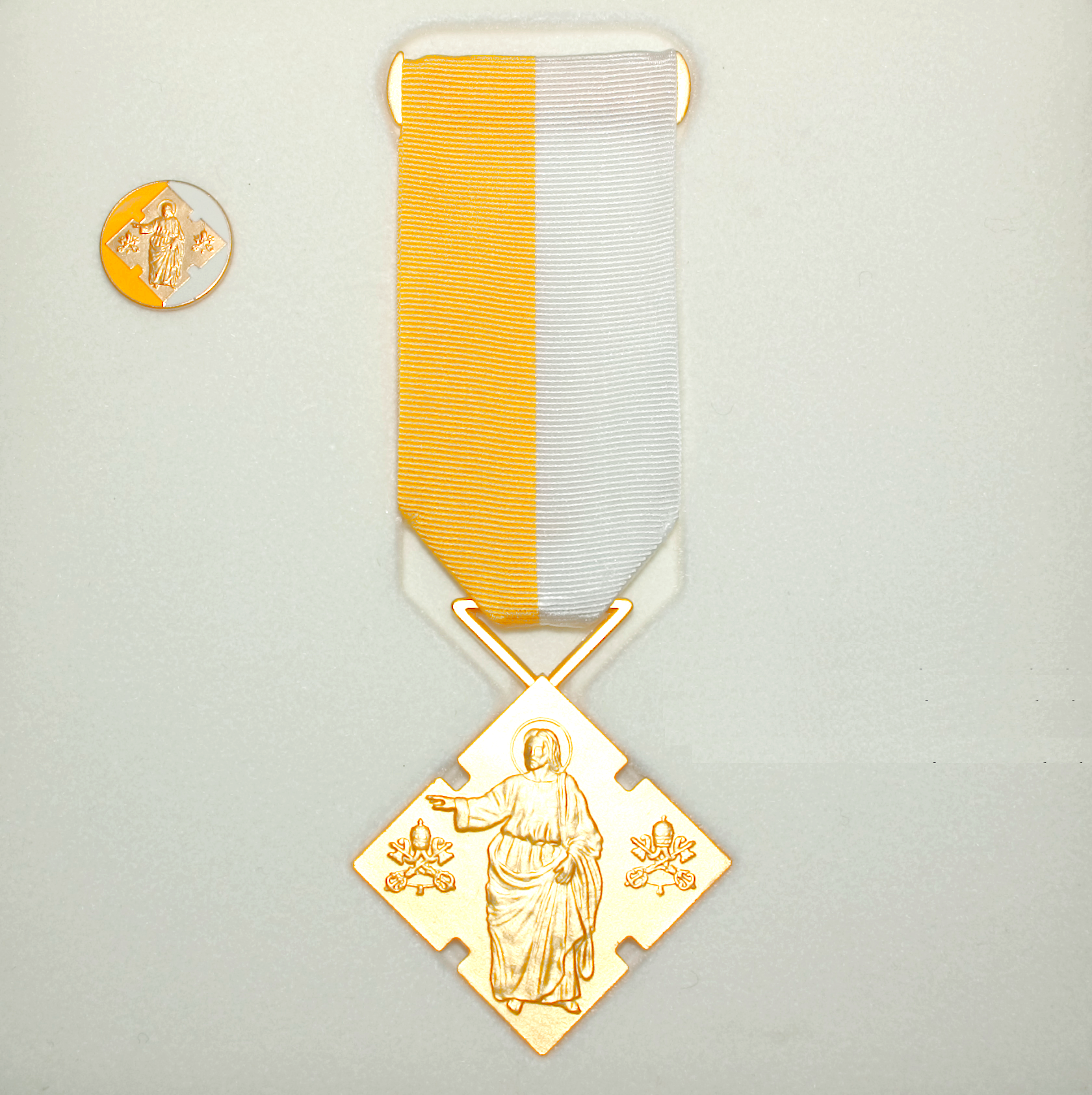
Benemerenti Medal (2009)

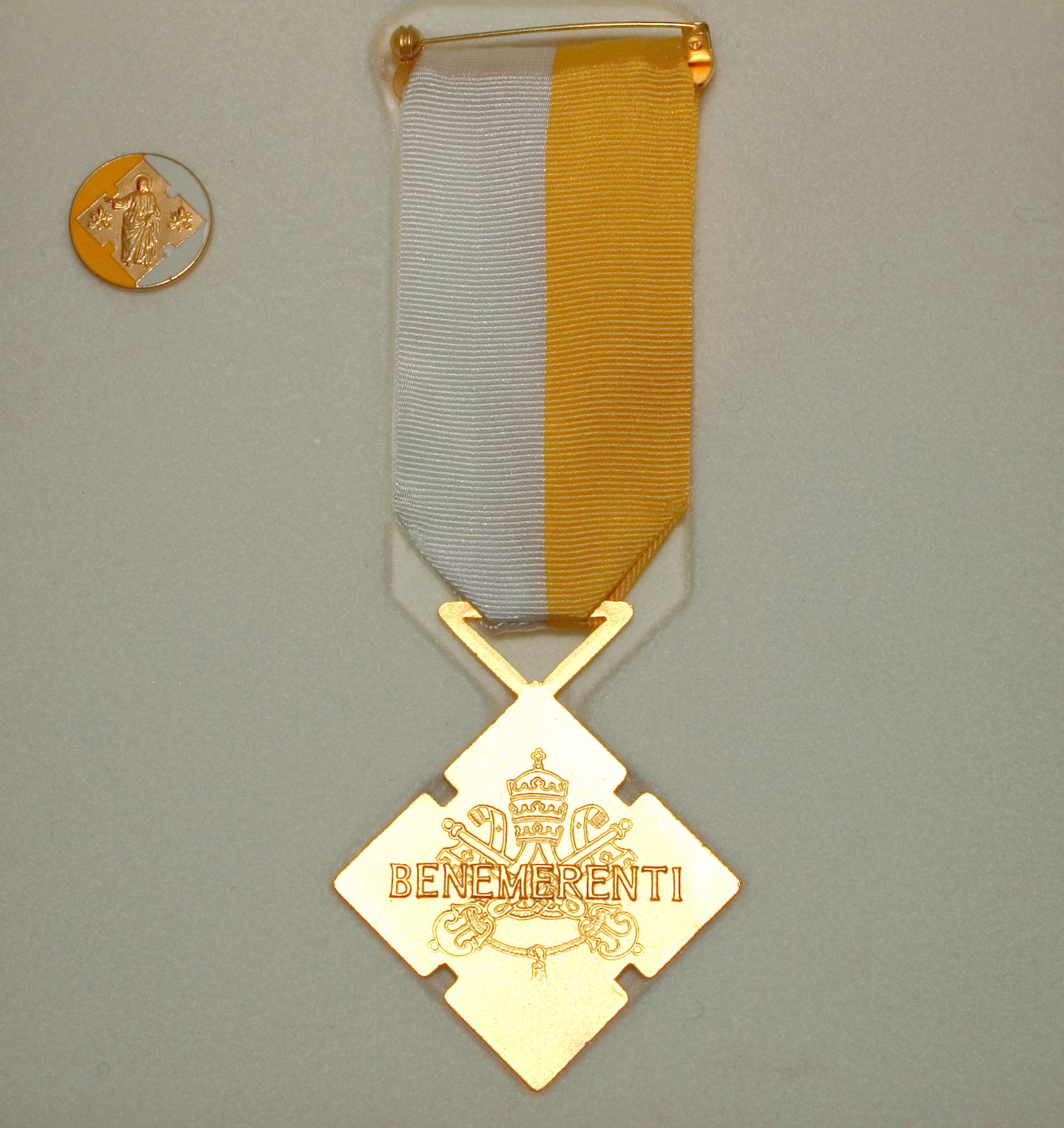
Benemerenti Medal (2009)

== Recipients ==
- List of Benemerenti medal recipients

== See also ==
- List of ecclesiastical decorations
