= Orders, decorations, and medals of the Holy See =

Papal Orders and decoration of merit of the Holy See

The orders, decorations, and medals of the Holy See include titles, chivalric orders, distinctions and medals honoured by the Holy See, with the Pope as the fount of honour, for deeds and merits of their recipients to the benefit of the Holy See, the Catholic Church, or their respective communities, societies, nations and the world at large.

Some of these honours are defunct or currently dormant, while some are still actively conferred.

== Chivalric orders ==
Papal orders of knighthood or Pontifical orders of knighthood are orders of knighthood bestowed in the name of the reigning Pope of the Catholic Church by his authority as head of the Holy See and sovereign of the Vatican City State. Historically, membership in these orders was either conferred by Papal bulls not signed by the Pope or by apostolic letters signed by the Pope himself. Since the reforms of these orders in the beginning of the 20th century, the diplomas have been signed by the Cardinal Secretary of State.

The Papal Orders of Knighthood comprise five orders awarded directly by the Holy See – in recognition of particular merit – and two others which it "recognises and supports": the Equestrian Order of the Holy Sepulchre of Jerusalem and the Sovereign Military Order of Malta. These last two conform with the more ancient tradition of chivalry where a promise or commitment is made on joining relating to future behaviour. Each has a separate merit award system for particular acts of merit. The Equestrian Order of the Holy Sepulchre is an organ of the Holy See and its diplomas are signed by the Cardinal Secretary of State of the Vatican. (The term equestrian in this context refers to the nature of these orders as knightly – conferring knighthood on members – derived from the Equestrians (Equites), a social class of Ancient Rome.)

- Supreme Order of Christ (no members as of 31 July 1993)
- Order of the Golden Spur (no members as of 23 April 2019)
- Order of Pius IX
- Order of Saint Gregory the Great
- Order of Saint Sylvester

Of the papal merit orders, the highest and most infrequently awarded is the Supreme Order of Christ; the second order is the equally rare Order of the Golden Spur; the third is the Order of Pius IX; the fourth is the Order of Saint Gregory the Great; and the fifth is the Order of Saint Sylvester.

- The awards of the Orders of Christ and the Golden Spur are made at the express wish of the Pope in consultation with the Cardinal Secretary of State.
- Awards of the Order of Pius IX (or Pian Order) are made to heads of state and senior members of their household at the time of official visits to the Holy See, to senior members of diplomatic missions accredited to the Vatican, and exceptionally, to those who have particularly served the Pope or the Holy See, at the discretion of the Cardinal Secretary of State.
- Awards of the Order of Saint Gregory the Great and the Order of Saint Sylvester are generally made on the recommendation of diocesan bishops, with the support of the apostolic nuncio.

=== Supreme Order of Christ ===
Tracing its origins to the dissolution of the Knights Templar, the Military Order of Our Lord Jesus Christ was established in 1319 in the Kingdom of Portugal and recognised by the Papal bull Ad ea ex quibus of 15 March 1319 of Pope John XXII. Some historians claim that under the terms of Ad ea ex quibus, the Popes instituted the right to award the membership of the Order themselves, though its text does not explicitly treat of this right. The position of the Catholic Church is that the Pope is the head of every religious order, and thus he can grant admission to these orders without the permission of their superiors general. The awarding of the Pope of the Supreme Order of Christ motu proprio brought the Papacy and the Crown of Portugal into conflict on several occasions, as the King of Portugal believed himself to be the only legitimate fons honorum of the Order. Protests regarding this conflict were made to Rome as late as 1825.

During a reorganisation of the Papal orders in 1905, Pope Pius X rendered the Supreme Order of Christ as the most senior Papal honour. On 15 April 1966, in the Papal bull Equestres ordinis, Pope Paul VI limited the award to Roman Catholic heads of state in commemoration of significant events that the Pope of Rome personally attended. The most recent presentation of the Order was to Frà Angelo de Mojana, 77th Prince and Grand Master of the Sovereign Military Order of Malta, in 1987. The last living member of the Order was King Baudouin of Belgium, who died in 1993.

=== Order of the Golden Spur/Militia ===
The second highest Papal order is the Order of the Golden Spur, also denominated the "Order of the Golden Militia". There is a lack of clear historical evidence of its foundation, but it is certain that it is the oldest of the Papal Orders. Broad authority to grant the Order diminished its prestige, and led Pope Gregory XVI to place the Order under the patronage of the Order of St. Sylvester in 1841. As part of this reorganization, the Pope limited the ability to grant the Order and revoked the appointments of those who were not granted it by Papal brief. In 1905 Pope Pius X separated the Order from the Order of St. Sylvester, establishing it as the Order of the Golden Militia. He also limited the number of knights to one hundred. A Papal bull of 1966 further limited it to Christian sovereigns and heads of state. That bull also denominated it the "Order of the Golden Militia", but the Annuario Pontificio lists it under two names, both as the "Order of the Golden Spur" and as the "Order of the Golden Militia". Jean, Grand Duke of Luxembourg was the last living knight of the Order.

=== Order of Pius IX ===
The third highest Papal order is the Order of Pius IX, founded on 17 June 1847 by Pope Pius IX. The Order of Pius IX is the highest Papal order currently awarded. There previously existed an Order of Pian Knights, founded in the 16th century, which later fell into abeyance. It is not related to this order. The Order of Pius IX is the first of the Papal Orders, by order of precedence, to include different grades. The highest grade is the Collar, followed by the Grand Cross, Commander with Star, Commander, and Knight. The Order may be presented to non-Catholic Christians and to non-Christians.

=== Order of Saint Gregory the Great ===
The fourth highest Papal order is the Equestrian Order of St. Gregory the Great. Pope Gregory XVI established the order on 1 September 1831 by the Papal brief Quod summis. It is awarded in four classes, with military and civil divisions. It was initially founded to reward meritorious civic or military service to the Papal States. Through the reforms of 1905, the Order was modified so that the classes paralleled those of the Order of Pius IX, excluding the collar. The Order is currently awarded for conspicuous service to the Catholic Church, without regard to religious affiliation. These awards are typically given premised on recommendations from bishops or Papal nuncios for specific services rendered to the Roman Catholic Church. Membership in the Order of St. Gregory the Great does not carry the religious obligations of the military orders, making it the preferred award of merit for individual service to the Catholic Church. Since 1994, women have been appointed as "dames" in the same classes as men.

=== Order of Saint Sylvester ===
The fifth highest Papal order is the Order of St. Sylvester. In 1841, Pope Gregory XVI reformed the Order of the Golden Spur as an order of merit, with recipients appointed by Papal brief. This reformed order was known as the "Order of St. Sylvester and the Golden Militia". The reforms of 1905 resulted in the separation of that order into the Order of St. Sylvester and the Order of the Golden Spur. The Order of St. Sylvester is presented in the same classes and grades as the Order of St. Gregory the Great, and is typically awarded to recognize and reward members of the laity for active service in the apostolates. It may also be presented to non-Catholics.

=== Orders under the protection of the Holy See ===
The term Papal Orders of Knighthood officially includes the Equestrian Order of the Holy Sepulchre, a religious order of chivalry, as it is under the direct protection of the Pope, who is sovereign of the order, and which has a Cardinal as Grand Master. The Order is headquartered in the Vatican City State.

Several military religious orders were established at the time of, and since, the Crusades. Of these, only the Order of the Holy Sepulchre and the Order of Malta are recognised by the Holy See.

The Sovereign Military Order of Malta is a sovereign order of chivalry. The Order and the Holy See exchange ambassadors. The Pope is not Sovereign of the Order nor does he appoint members to the ranks of knighthood. He is, however, the first to be informed following the election of the Grand Master and appoints a Cardinal Protector of the Order. The Grand Master, a lay professed religious, ranks as a Cardinal of the Holy Roman Church and his accorded the title Eminent Highness and Prince.

==== Equestrian Order of the Holy Sepulchre of Jerusalem ====
The Equestrian Order of the Holy Sepulchre of Jerusalem traces its founding to the First Crusade, although not as an organised crusading order but an association of knights. After the fall of Jerusalem in 1182, it remained an order of chivalry. In 1489, Pope Innocent VIII suppressed the Order and ruled that it was to be merged with the Knights Hospitaller. In 1496, Pope Alexander VI restored the independence of the Order, decreed that the Order would no longer be governed by the office of Custodian, and further decreed that the senior office of the Order would henceforth be raised to the rank of "Grand Master", reserving this title for himself and his successors. In 1847, Pope Pius IX reorganized the Order and placed it under the direct protection of the Holy See. In 1949, Pope Pius XII decreed that the Grand Master of the Order would henceforth be a cardinal appointed directly by the Pope, who would remain Sovereign of the Order. Appointments and promotions are made by the Holy See and Diplomas signed by the Cardinal Secretary of State of the Vatican. The Latin Patriarch of Jerusalem is ex officio Grand Prior of the Order, while the lay head is the Governor-General. The present Cardinal Grand Master is Fernando Filoni succeeding Edwin Frederick O'Brien, on 8 December 2019.

==== Sovereign Military Order of Malta ====
The Order of Malta also traces its history to the late 11th century, but it first became a religious military order by a bull of Pope Paschal II of 1113. The Grand Master is elected by the Council Complete of State of the Order and serves for life or until abdication. Before a person elected as the Grand Master takes the oath of office, the Pope of Rome must be informed of the election. The Pope also appoints the Cardinal Patron and a prelate of the Order.

=== Defunct/dormant orders ===
- Order of Saint Cecilia
- Order of Saint John of the Lateran
- Order of Saint Sylvester and the Militia Aurata
- Order of the Moor
- Knights of Pius

=== Other Catholic chivalric orders ===
Historically, many military orders and other chivalric orders were founded in association with the Holy See. Most of them became extinct, were suppressed, or merged with contemporary chivalric orders. Some of them survived under the protection of the Holy See as in the list above. A few of them remained as patrimony of dynastic royal houses. Some of these dynastic orders of knighthood were recognised as Roman Catholic by Papal bulls of the Holy See, and although they are no more affiliated with or protected by the Holy See, some of them are still exclusively designated for Catholics.

In response to a proliferation of self-proclaimed chivalric orders claiming recognition from the Roman Catholic Church, the Holy See's Secretariat of State issued a statement clarifying that "other than its own Equestrian Orders [...] the Holy See recognises and supports only the Sovereign Military Order of Malta [...] and the Equestrian Order of the Holy Sepulchre". All other self-styled chivalric orders, the statement continued, "whether of recent origin or mediaeval foundation, are not recognised by the Holy See" and "the Holy See does not guarantee their historical or juridical legitimacy, their ends or organisational structures... to prevent the continuation of abuses which may result in harm to people of good faith, the Holy See confirms that it attributes absolutely no value whatsoever to certificates of membership or insignia issued by these groups, and it considers inappropriate the use of churches or chapels for their so-called 'ceremonies of investiture'."

The Teutonic Order is no longer an order of chivalry, but is a purely religious order within the Roman Catholic Church. The Teutonic Order was founded as a hospital brotherhood in 1190 in Acre, Israel. In 1198, the Order became a religious military order of chivalry. However, since 1929 it has been a purely religious order of priests, brothers and sisters, with a category of 12 honorary knights and an unlimited number of associates, known as Marianer. Its headquarters are in Vienna, Austria. The current Grand Master of the Teutonic Order is Frank Bayard.

== Other distinctions ==
=== Pro Ecclesia et Pontifice ===
The medal was established in 1888 and is awarded by the Pope to members of the clergy and laity for service to the Catholic Church and the Pope of Rome. Until 1996, it was the highest Papal decoration that could be awarded to women.

=== Benemerenti medal ===
The Benemerenti Medal is awarded by the Pope to members of the clergy and laity for service to the Catholic Church. The tradition can be traced back to the 18th century.

=== Jerusalem Pilgrim's Cross ===
The Jerusalem Pilgrim's Cross was established in 1901. It is an honour awarded in the name of the Pope as a recognition of merit to pilgrims to the Holy Land.

=== Golden Rose ===
The Golden Rose is a gold ornament. Recipients have included churches and sanctuaries, royalty, military figures, and governments.

=== Defunct/dormant distinctions ===
- Blessed sword and hat
- Medal of Military Merit
- Fidei et Virtuti
- Pro Petri Sede
- Lauretan Cross
- Peter's Advocacy Cross
- Lateran Cross

== Titles and honours ==
=== Political titles ===
==== Of ecclesiastical or religious authorities ====
- "Sovereign of the State of Vatican City": Supreme Pontiff of the Catholic Church (by Papal supremacy; see Papal coronation); Pope
- Papal styles, i. e., sobriquets:
  - His Holiness
- Prince of the Church:
  - Prince-primate
  - Prince-bishop, especially one of the two Co-Princes of Andorra (1278–)
  - Prince-abbot
  - Prince-provost
  - Prince-Grand Master of the Sovereign Military Order of Malta (originally established as Prince of the Holy Roman Empire in 1607)
- Royal titles:
    - Incomplete
  - Royal styles, i. e., sobriquets:
    - Hereditary royal styles:
      - "Apostolic Majesty" or "Apostolic King": Kings of Hungary
      - "Most Catholic King (Queen)": Kings of Spain
      - "Most Christian King": Kings of France
      - "Most Faithful Majesty" or "Most Faithful King": Kings of Portugal
    - Personal royal styles:
      - "Defender of the Faith": King Henry VIII of England, but Pope Paul III revoked it upon his excommunication, and his wife Catherine of Aragon in her own right; and King James V of Scotland
      - "Protector and Defender of the Christian Faith" : King James IV of Scotland

=== Noble ===
- Papal nobility in se:
  - Prince
  - Duke
  - Marquis
  - Count
  - Baron

=== Clerical ===
- Hierarchy of the Catholic Church
  - Ecclesiastical address

=== Lay members ===
- Papal Household
  - Grand Master of the Sacred Apostolic Hospice
  - Princes Assistant to the Pontifical Throne
  - General Counsellor of the State of Vatican City
  - Commandant of the Papal Swiss Guard
  - Counsellors of the State of Vatican City
  - President of the Pontifical Academy of Sciences
  - Gentlemen of His Holiness
  - Procurators of the Apostolic Palaces
  - Attachés of the Papal Antechamber
  - Those in the personal service of the Pope
  - Aide de Chambre
  - Dean of the Hall of the Papal Antechamber

== See also ==
- Category:Catholic orders of chivalry
- Category:Catholic ecclesiastical decorations
- List of ecclesiastical decorations

== Sources and external links ==
- Noonan, Jr., James-Charles (1996). The Church Visible: The Ceremonial Life and Protocol of the Roman Catholic Church. Viking. p. 196. ISBN 0-670-86745-4.
- Orders, Decorations and Medals of the Vatican, by Megan Robertson (at Medals of the World website)
- The Knights of The Holy See by Alessandra Malesci Baccani, Office of the Knighthood of Honors and Heraldic, official website of the Italian government
- Kay Ehling und Jörg Ernesti: Glänzende Propaganda. Kirchengeschichte auf Papstmedaillen. Herder, Freiburg/Basel/Wien 2019, ISBN 978-3451376986
