= Order of Saint Nicholas =

The Order of Saint Nicholas may refer to:

- Order of Saint Nicholas (Georgia)
- Order of Saint Nicholas Thaumaturgus (Wrangel), 1920
- Order of Saint Nicholas the Wonderworker, 1929, Russia (Exile)
- Order of Saint Nicholas (Melkite Greek Catholic Eparchy of Newton), a regional lay order founded in 1991
