= Archons of the Ecumenical Patriarchate =

Title awarded in the Eastern Orthodox Church

In Christian theology, the title of archon may be given to a layperson who serves in the Eastern Orthodox Church.

The Archons of the Ecumenical Patriarchate are given this title by the Patriarch of Constantinople; they have been selected from among the laity due to service to those portions of the Eastern Orthodox Church under his particular guidance. Approximately twenty-four archons are appointed each year.

The Order of Saint Andrew, comprising the Archons living in America, was founded in 1966 under Patriarch Athenagoras, when Archbishop Iakovos conferred the honor upon thirty members of the Greek Orthodox Archdiocese of America. The Order's first Grand Commander was Pierre De Mets. The current Grand Commander is Anthony J. Limberakis, MD who has led the Order to advocate for religious freedom for the Ecumenical Patriarchate. Upon induction into the "Order of St. Andrew", as the Archons of America are styled as a group, the honoree swears an oath "to defend and promote the Greek Orthodox faith and tradition."

The first major efforts of the Order were aimed at the restoration of the existing Orthodox facilities in Istanbul, an effort that has had limited success with the continued forced closure of the Halki seminary and with President Erdoğan's decree reverting the Hagia Sophia and Chora Church from museums to mosques.

In recent years the Order of Saint Andrew has also concerned itself strongly with the situation of the Ecumenical Patriarchate within Turkey, including governmental interference in church elections, and lack of training facilities for clergy.

While it refers to itself as an "Order", it does not claim to be an order of chivalry, as such.

== Archons outside the United States ==
On November 19, 1991, according to a decision of the Holy and Sacred Synod of the Ecumenical Patriarchate, the "Brotherhood of the Most Holy Lady Pammakaristos" was created and on February 22, 1992, the first administrative board was appointed. The purposes of the Brotherhood were set as the spiritual unity of the Archons outside of the United States, their connection to the Ecumenical Throne and their cultural activity and cooperation as well as their activities on publishing, authorship, social contribution, the annual convention in Phanar on the Sunday of the Samaritan Woman, the commemoration of the Holy Patriarchs of Constantinople, the financial support of the works of the Patriarchate, etc.

== See also ==
- Archon
- Ecclesiastical decoration
- Ecclesiastical award
- List of ecclesiastical decorations
