= Order of Jerusalem =

The Order of Jerusalem may refer to various knighthoods/damehoods:

- Knights Hospitaller and its modern-day successors
- Teutonic Order and its modern-day successors
- Order of Saint Lazarus of Jerusalem and its modern-day successors
- Equestrian Order of the Holy Sepulchre of Jerusalem, a Roman Catholic chivalric order
- Honourable Order of Jerusalem, a Methodist chivalric order
- Sovereign Military Order of the Temple of Jerusalem, an ecumenical Christian self-styled order
- Order of Jerusalem (distinction), a distinction of the State of Palestine
