= Award =

Something given to a person or a group of people to recognize their merit or excellence

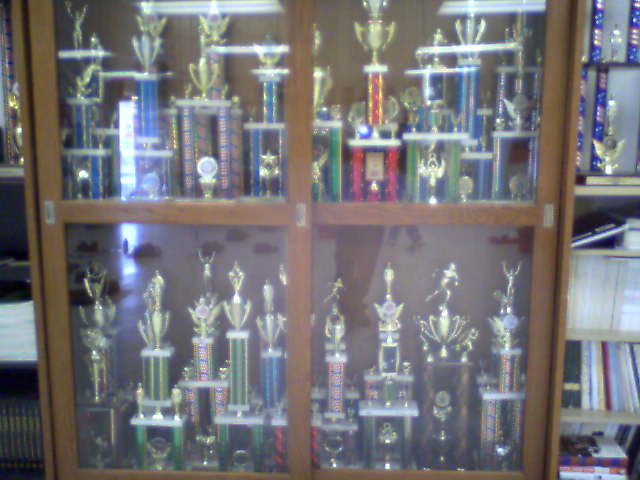
Some of the trophies earned by the NJROTC unit of Port Charlotte High School.

An award, sometimes called a distinction, is given to a recipient as a token of recognition of excellence in a certain field. When the token is a medal, ribbon or other item designed for wearing, it is known as a decoration.

An award may be described by three aspects: 1) to whom it is given to 2) what 3) by whom, all varying according to purpose.

The recipient is often awarded to an individual, a student, athlete or representative of a group of people, be it an organisation, a sports team or a whole country. The award item may be a decoration or an insignia suitable for wearing, such as a medal, badge, award pin or rosette. It can also be a token object such as a certificate, diploma, championship belt, trophy or plaque. The award may also be accompanied by a title of honor, and an object of direct cash value, such as prize money or a scholarship.

Furthermore, an honorable mention is an award given, typically in education, that does not confer the recipient(s) a higher standing but is considered worth mentioning in an honourable way. An award may be conferred as a state decoration by a sovereign state, dynasty or other public authority (see fount of honour), or a private organisation or individual. The latter may also include ecclesiastical authorities, such as in the case of ecclesiastical awards.

For example, the Nobel Prize recognizes contributions to society, while the Pulitzer Prize honors literary achievements. An award may be a public acknowledgment of excellence without any tangible token or prize.

Awards for sports tournaments often take the form of cups, following a tradition harking back to the ancient Greek tripod given to winners in athletic contests. The Stanley Cup is a modern example. In contrast, awards for employee recognition often take the form of plaques or crystal pieces. An award may carry a monetary prize given to the recipient.

Awards may also celebrate the individual season of a player such as mvp awards given in the NFL or the Ballon d'Or.

Finally, an award may recognize participation rather than victory. There is controversy regarding the appropriateness of participation awards for students in United States schools.

A relative field to awards is phaleristics, an auxiliary science of history and numismatics which studies orders, fraternities and award items, such as medals and other decorations.

== See also ==
- Lists of awards
  - Military awards and decorations
  - Civil awards and decorations
    - Ecclesiastical award
    - Ecclesiastical decoration
- Prize
- Title
- Order of precedence
- Order (distinction)
