= Order of the Golden Fleece (Georgia) =

Award of Georgia

Order of the Golden Fleece ოქროს საწმისის ორდენი
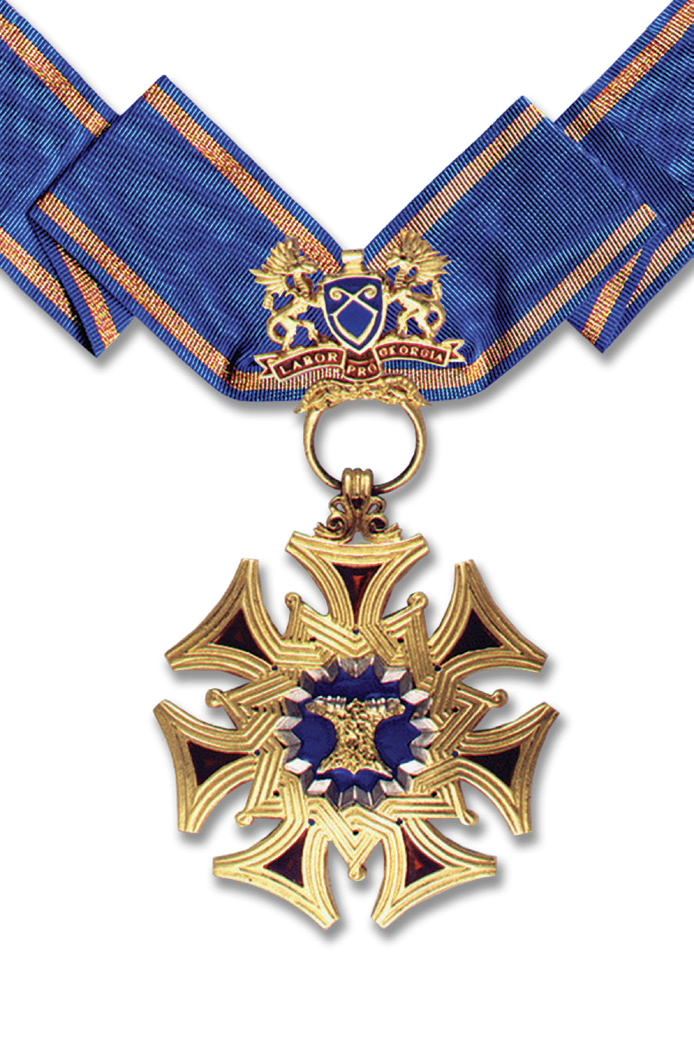
- Order of the Golden Fleece with Collar

Awarded by Georgia
- Type: Single grade order
- Established: 26 June 1998

Precedence
- Next (higher): Order of Saint Nicholas
- Ribbon bar

The Order of the Golden Fleece (Georgian: ოქროს საწმისის ორდენი, ok'ros sats'misis ordeni) is an honor awarded by the government of Georgia. It was established in 1998 and comes next in rank to the Order of Saint Nicholas. The Order is named after the mythical Golden Fleece, which was held in Colchis in what is now western Georgia.

== Statute ==
The Order of the Golden Fleece is awarded to individuals with foreign citizenship and those holding no citizenship who have significantly contributed to Georgia's governmental improvement, national security interests, sovereignty and protection of territorial unity, formation of democratic and free society, development of useful bilateral relationships with foreign countries and international organizations, protection of rights of Georgian citizens living abroad, popularization of Georgian culture, and development of Georgian science and art. As the award is not given to Georgian nationals, it does not carry any monetary grant.

== Notable recipients ==
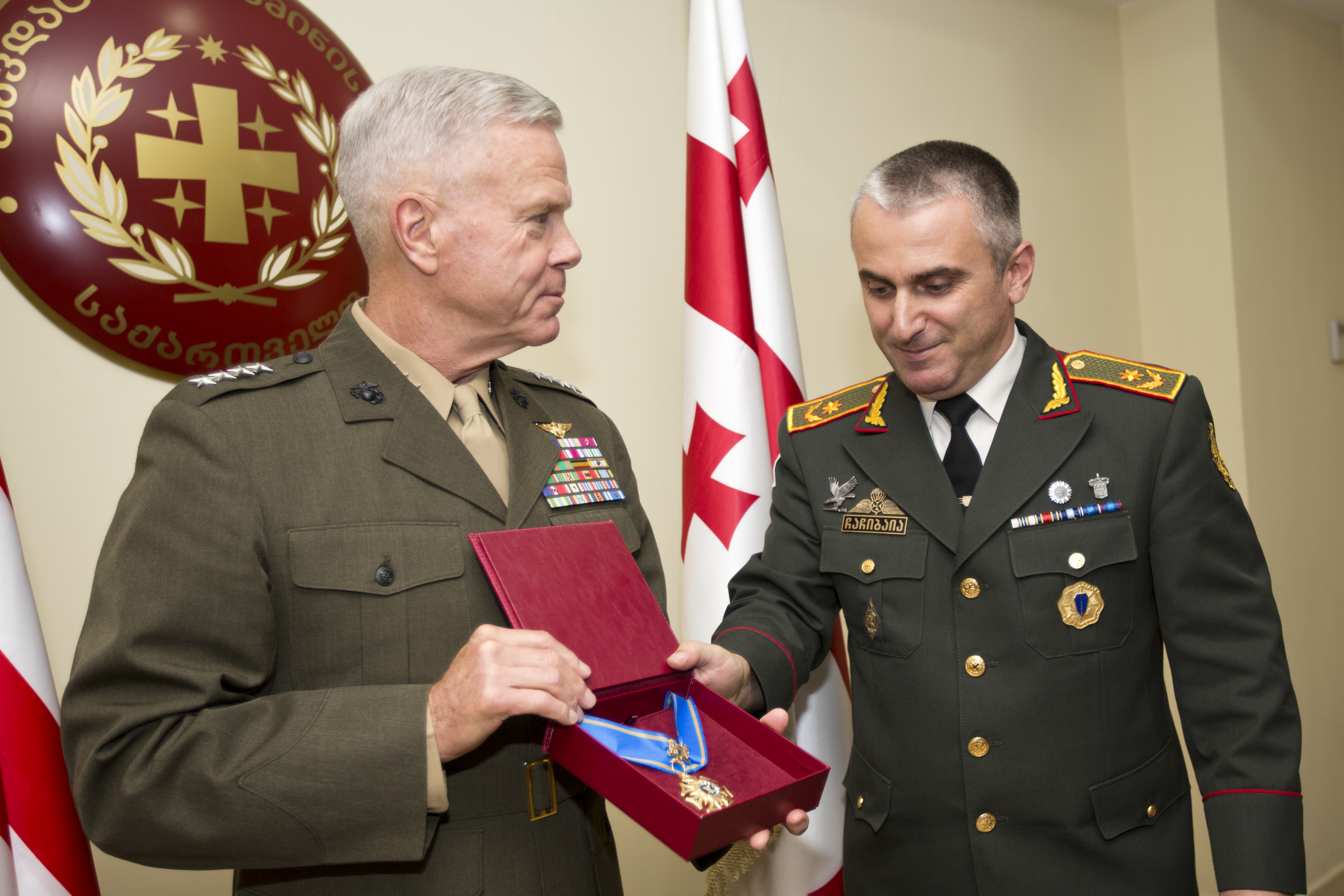
American general James F. Amos is presented with the Order of the Golden Fleece by Georgian general Vladimer Chachibaia in Tbilisi in 2014.

- Süleyman Demirel, 9th President of Turkey (1999)
- Gerhard Schröder, 7th Chancellor of Germany (2000)
- Heydar Aliyev, 3rd President of Azerbaijan (2001)
- Juan Antonio Samaranch, 7th President of the International Olympic Committee (2001)
- Elizabeth II, Queen of the United Kingdom (2002)
- Islom Karimov, 1st President of Uzbekistan (2003)
- Rasul Gamzatov, Avar poet (2003)
- Kirsan Ilyumzhinov, 1st President of Kalmykia (2003)
- Bartholomew I, Patriarch of Constantinople (2007)
- Toomas Hendrik Ilves, 4th President of Estonia (2007)
- Kürşad Tüzmen, Minister of State of Turkey (2009)
- Gabriela von Habsburg, Ambassador of Georgia to Germany and abstract sculptor (2009)
- Serzh Sargsyan, 3rd President of Armenia (2009)
- Allahshukur Pashazadeh, Grand Mufti of the Caucasus (2009)
- Matthew Bryza, United States diplomat (2009)
- Viktor Yushchenko, 3rd President of Ukraine (2009)
- Marie Anne Isler Béguin, French member of the European Parliament (2009)
- Javier Solana, Spanish politician and diplomat (2010)
- Strobe Talbott, American foreign policy analyst (2010)
- Recep Tayyip Erdoğan, Prime Minister of Turkey (2010)
- James F. Amos, 35th Commandant of the United States Marine Corps (2014)
- Ben Hodges, U.S. lieutenant general (2015)
- Juan Echánove, Spanish diplomat (2015)
- Philip Breedlove, American Air Force General (2016)
- John H. Costello, CNFA Europe Board of Directors Chairman and CNFA Board of Director (2016)
- Lech Kończak, Polish diplomat (2021)
- Abdullah II, King of Jordan (2022)

== See also ==
- Orders, decorations, and medals of Georgia
- Order of Queen Tamara (disambiguation)
