= Jerusalem Pilgrim's Cross =

Jerusalem Cross Signum Sacri Itineris Hierosolymitani
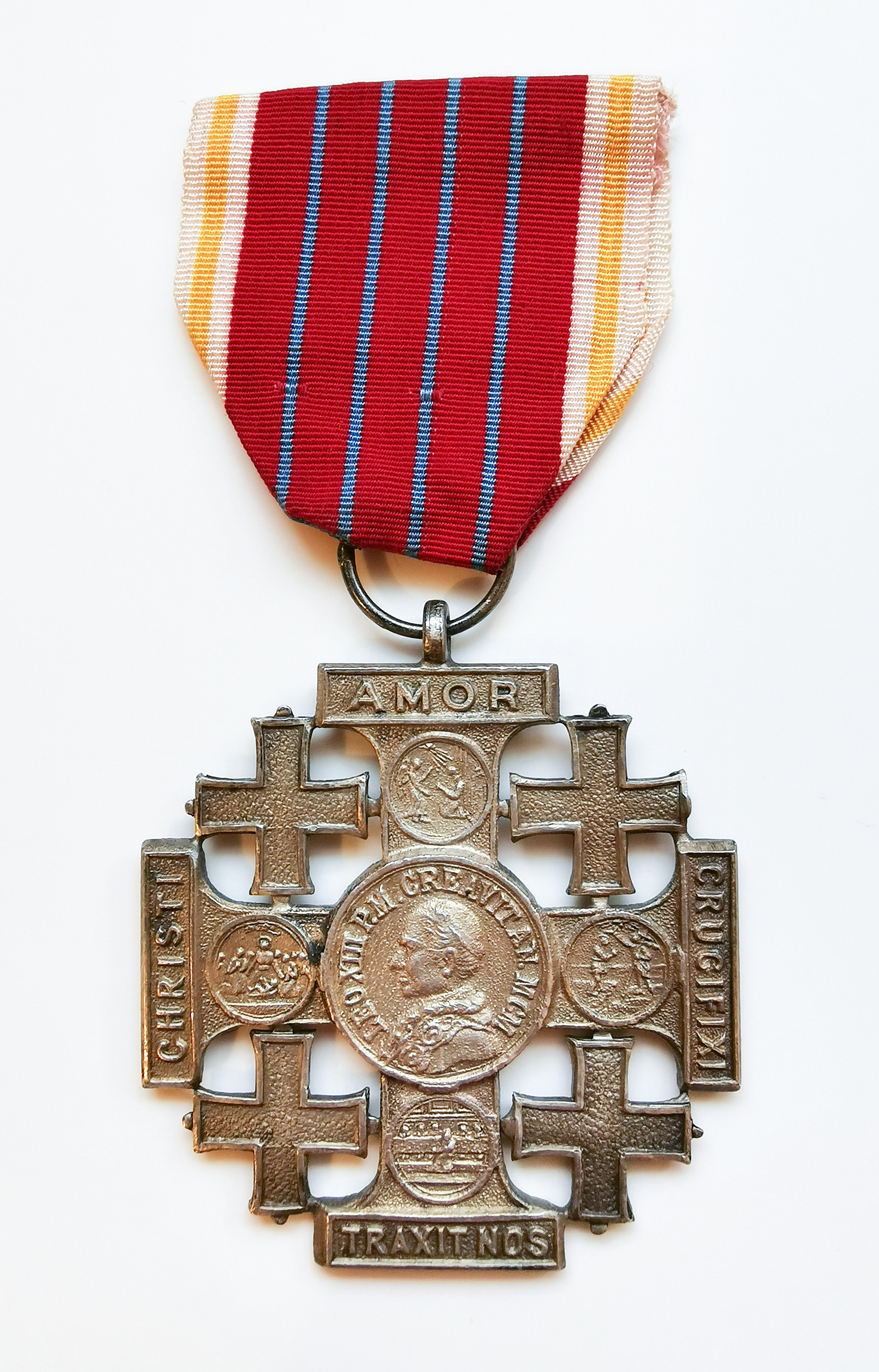
- Obverse of the decoration (silver)
- Type: Three degree medal (Gold, Silver and Bronze)
- Awarded for: Support for Christian holy sites during a pilgrimage to the Holy Land
- Country: Holy See
- Presented by: the Franciscan Custodian of the Holy Land for the Holy See
- Eligibility: Practicing Catholics
- Status: Currently awarded
- Established: 2 May 1901
- Ribbon of the decoration

Precedence
- Next (higher): Benemerenti medal
- Related: Papal Lateran Cross

The Jerusalem Pilgrim's Cross (Latin: Signum Sacri Itineris Hierosolymitani) is an honour of the Holy See awarded in the name of the Pope as a recognition of merit to pilgrims to the Holy Land. It is, alongside the five papal knightly orders, one of the eight distinctions awarded by the Vatican. The order was founded by Pope Leo XIII in the year 1901.

The decoration is worn on the left side of the chest. It should not be worn except in religious solemnities, processions, pilgrimages, or in the presence of the Pope.

== History ==
The Signum Sacri Itineris Hierosolymitani was established by Pope Leo XIII on 2 May 1901 to honour and to endorse pilgrimage to the Holy Places of Christianity.

A certificate from a parish priest was originally needed to attest to the morality of the candidate and affirm that there was a pious motive to undertake the voyage. As of 2015, a certificate is no longer needed. The medal is never sent and can only be conferred at the office of the Custodian of the Holy Land in Jerusalem, belonging to the Franciscan Order. He presents it in the name of the Sovereign Pontiff. The grade depends on the number of trips the recipient has made to the city and whether appropriate actions for the Holy Land have been made.

== Insignia ==
The medal is a Jerusalem cross in gold, silver or bronze. The centre of the front is a small depiction of Pope Leo XIII with the surrounding Latin inscription LEO XIII CREAVIT ANNO MCM (Leo XIII created [this medal] in 1900). In the crossbars, there are four biblical scenes showing the early life and the ministry of Jesus with the inscription CHRISTI AMOR CRUCIFIXI TRAXIT NOS (The love of Christ crucified has attracted us):

- Annunciation
- Nativity of Jesus
- Baptism of Jesus
- Eucharist

In the center of the reverse, there is the image of the risen Christ. The crossbars show four scenes of the Passion with the inscription SIGNUM SACRI ITINERIS HIEROSOL[YMITANI] (Sign of the holy voyage of Jerusalem):

- Jesus praying in the Garden of Gethsemane
- Flagellation of Christ
- Jesus wearing the crown of thorns
- Crucifixion of Jesus

The cross is suspended from a ribbon of red silk with four blue stripes in the middle. On the edges at each side runs a white band broken by a dark yellow bar.

== See also ==
- Jerusalem Cross (Prussia)
- List of ecclesiastical decorations
