= Honourable Order of Jerusalem =

The Honourable Order of Jerusalem (also spelled as the Honorable Order of Jerusalem) is an ecclesiastical decoration conferred by the World Methodist Council. It is one of the highest distinctions in Methodism. The Honourable Order of Jerusalem was created to “honor individuals whose service to the global Methodist/Wesleyan family has been marked with honor and distinction.”

== See also ==
- Chivalric order
- List of ecclesiastical decorations
