= Fidei et Virtuti =

Cross Fidei et Virtuti Cross of Mentana
- Type: one degree medal
- Awarded for: Participation in the campaign against Garibaldi's volunteers in 1867
- Presented by: (Vatican City) The Holy See
- Eligibility: French and Papal troops
- Status: Obsolete
- Established: November 14, 1867
- Ribbon of the Cross Fidei et Virtuti

Precedence
- Next (higher): Benemerenti medal
- Equivalent: Medal Pro Petri Sede

The Cross Fidei et Virtuti, also referred to as Cross of Mentana, was a decoration for military merit bestowed by the Holy See during the Italian unification.

== History ==
The cross was instituted by Pope Pius IX on 14 November 1867 after the victory of French-Papal troops in the Battle of Mentana. It was not limited to the Battle of Mentana and given to all participants of the campaign against Garibaldi's volunteers.

On 3 March 1868, the Imperial French government authorized the wearing of the medal with French uniforms.

== Appearance ==
The silver cross consists of a cross pattée with concave ends to the arms.

The cross is suspended from a white ribbon with two light blue stripes in the middle. Medal bars were attached to the ribbon to indicate the different battles that each individual cross was awarded for.

== See also ==
- List of ecclesiastical decorations
