= 35th Air Defense Artillery Brigade =

- Shoulder sleeve insignia
- Active: 2005 – Present
- Country: United States
- Branch: United States Army
- Type: Air Defense Artillery
- Size: Brigade
- Part of: 94th Army Air and Missile Defense Command
- Garrison/HQ: Osan Air Base (South Korea)
- Nickname: The Dragon Brigade
- Motto: "Ready in Defense"
- Colors: Scarlet and Yellow
- Mascot: Dragon
- Engagements: World War I World War II -Naptles-Foggia -Anzio -Rome-Arno -Southern France (with arrowhead) -Rhineland -Ardennse-Alsace -Central Europe Global War on Terror
- Decorations: -Army Superior Unit Award with Oak Leaf Cluster (2007-2009, 2015-2017)

Commanders
- Current commander: COL Kevin P. Stonerook
- Notable commanders: Aaron Bradshaw Jr.

Insignia
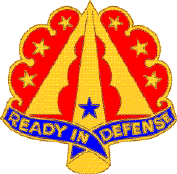
- Distinctive unit insignia

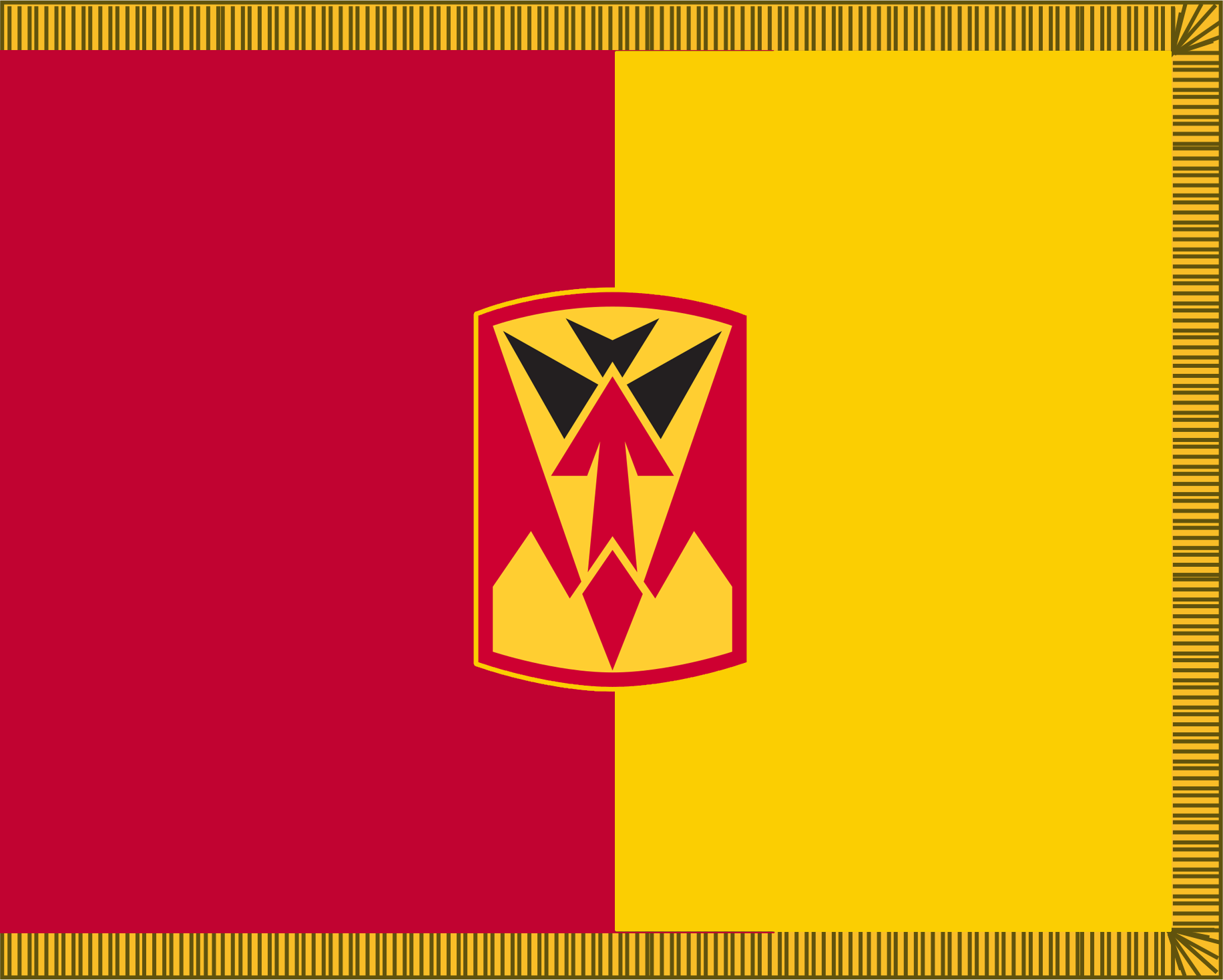
- 35th Air Defense Artillery Brigade Flag

The 35th Air Defense Artillery Brigade (ADAB) is an Air Defense Artillery unit of the United States Army subordinate to the Eighth United States Army, located at Osan Air Base in the Republic of Korea. 35th ADAB has integrated the Terminal High Altitude Area Defense (THAAD) into its layered defense on the Korean Peninsula. D Battery 2nd Air Defense Artillery Regiment (ADAR).

== History ==
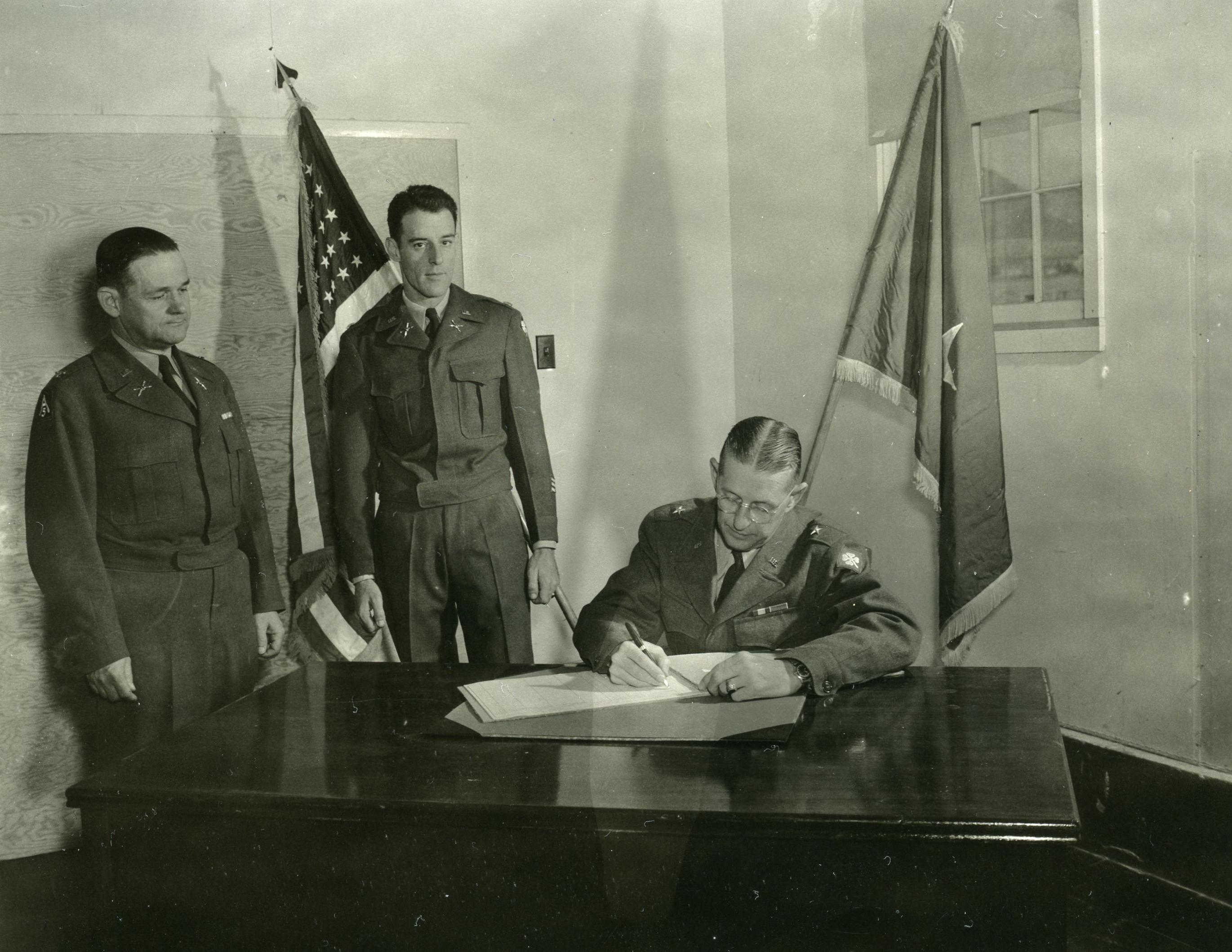
Brig. Gen. Robert W. Berry signs the officer roster of the newly-activated 35th Anti-Aircraft Brigade, Fort Bliss, while Col. Pierre B. Densen (left) and Lt. Col. Walter Killilae (center) look on c. 1948

The 35 ADAB was originally organized at Fort Hunt, Virginia as the 35th Artillery Brigade, Coast Artillery Corps in June of 1918 and was demobilized March of 1919. I was reorganized in October 1933 as HHB, 35th Coast Artillery Brigade. It was redesignated HHB, 35th Antiaircraft Artillery Brigade in June 1944 and demobilized again in October 1945.

It was reactivated in November 1948 at Fort Bliss, Texas. The 35th Anti-Aircraft Brigade subsequently moved to Fort Meade, Maryland in 1950 to provide anti-aircraft defense of Washington, DC and to plan the defense of other cities in the vicinity. There, the 35th Anti-Aircraft Brigade set an Air Defense Artillery milestone as it became the first Nike-Ajax guided missile command in 1957. In March 1958, the Brigade was redesignated as the 35th Artillery Brigade (Air Defense), and operated the country's first Nike-Hercules site at Davidsonville, Maryland. It included the 1st Battalion, 52nd ADAR. The Brigade was inactivated on 4 June 1973 at Fort Meade, Maryland.

It was reactivated again in 1985 at Fort Lewis, Washington.

== Organization ==
- 35th Air Defense Artillery Brigade, at Osan Air Base (South Korea)
  - Headquarters and Headquarters Battery
  - 2nd Battalion, 1st Air Defense Artillery Regiment, at Camp Carroll (MIM-104 Patriot)
  - 6th Battalion, 52nd Air Defense Artillery Regiment, at Suwon Air Base (MIM-104 Patriot, AN/TWQ-1 Avenger)
  - Combined Task Force-Defender (CTF-D), at Camp Carroll
    - Battery D, 2nd ADAR, at Camp Carroll (THAAD)

== Previous Units ==
- 1st Battalion, 43rd ADAR
  - Headquarters and Headquarters Battery (HHB) - Camp Humphreys
  - Alpha Battery (PATRIOT) - Camp Humphreys
  - Bravo Battery (PATRIOT) - Suwon, AB
  - Charlie Battery (PATRIOT) - Camp Humpherys
  - Delta Battery - (PATRIOT) - Osan, AB
  - Echo Battery - (AVENGER AND SENTINEL TEAMS) - Camp Humphreys
  - Fox Company - (Maintenance) - Camp Humphreys
