= Pro Petri Sede =

Papal Award

Medal Pro Petri Sede Castelfidardo Medal
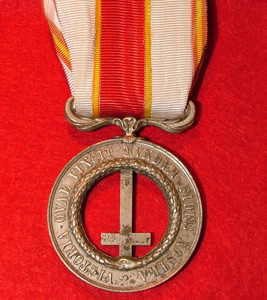
- Medal Pro Petri Sede
- Type: four degree medal
- Awarded for: Participation in the campaign 1859/60
- Presented by: Holy See
- Eligibility: Papal troops
- Status: Obsolete
- Established: November 12, 1860
- Ribbon of the Medal Pro Petri Sede

Precedence
- Next (higher): Benemerenti medal
- Equivalent: Cross Fidei et Virtuti

The Medal Pro Petri Sede, also referred to as Castelfidardo Medal, was a decoration for military merit bestowed by the Holy See in the Second Italian War of Independence during the Italian unification.

== History ==
The medal was instituted by Pope Pius IX on 12 November 1860 after the defeat of the Papal troops in the Battle of Castelfidardo. It was not limited to the Battle of Castelfidardo and given to the participants of the campaign.

== Appearance ==
The decoration consists of a medal with an inverted cross - the Cross of Saint Peter - in the centre. The inscription is VICTORIA, QUAE VICIT MUNDUM, FIDES NOSTRA On the obverse side of the medal the inscription is PRO PETRI SEDE, PIO IX P. M. A. XV (transl. For the See of Peter).

The medal is suspended from a red ribbon with two narrow white stripes edged in yellow. Medal bars were attached to the ribbon to indicate the different battles that each individual medal was awarded for.

It was issued in four classes:

- Enameled gold: For officers in command.
- Gold: For special acts of valor by commissioned officers.
- Silver: For commissioned officers.
- White metal: For non-commissioned officers and enlisted ranks.

== Notable recipients ==
- John J. Coppinger
- Myles Keogh

== See also ==
- List of ecclesiastical decorations
