= Aaron Bradshaw Jr. =

United States Army general (1894–1976)

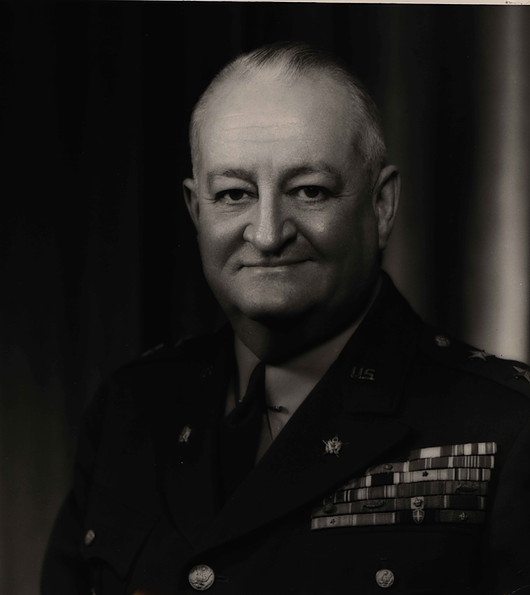
- Born: July 1, 1894; Washington, D.C., US
- Died: November 8, 1976 (aged 82); Washington, D.C., US
- Military career
- Allegiance: United States
- Branch: United States Army
- Service years: 1917-1953
- Rank: Major general
- Service number: 0-5290
- Unit: Coast Artillery Corps
- Commands: 35th Anti-Aircraft Artillery Brigade; 34th Anti-Aircraft Artillery Brigade
- Conflicts: World War I; Meuse–Argonne offensive; World War II; Operation Torch; Invasion of Sicily; Battle of Monte Cassino; Gothic Line; Spring 1945 offensive in Italy
- Awards: Distinguished Service Medal; Silver Star; Legion of Merit (2); Bronze Star Medal; Army Commendation Medal (2); Order of the Crown of Italy

Aaron Bradshaw Jr. CBE (July 1, 1894 – November 8, 1976) was a highly decorated officer in the United States Army with the rank of major general. A graduate of the United States Military Academy, he is most noted as an anti-aircraft artillery officer during World War II.

Following the war, Bradshaw remained in the Army and served in logistics assignments, including assistant chief of staff for logistics (G-4), U.S. European Command.

== Early years and World War I ==
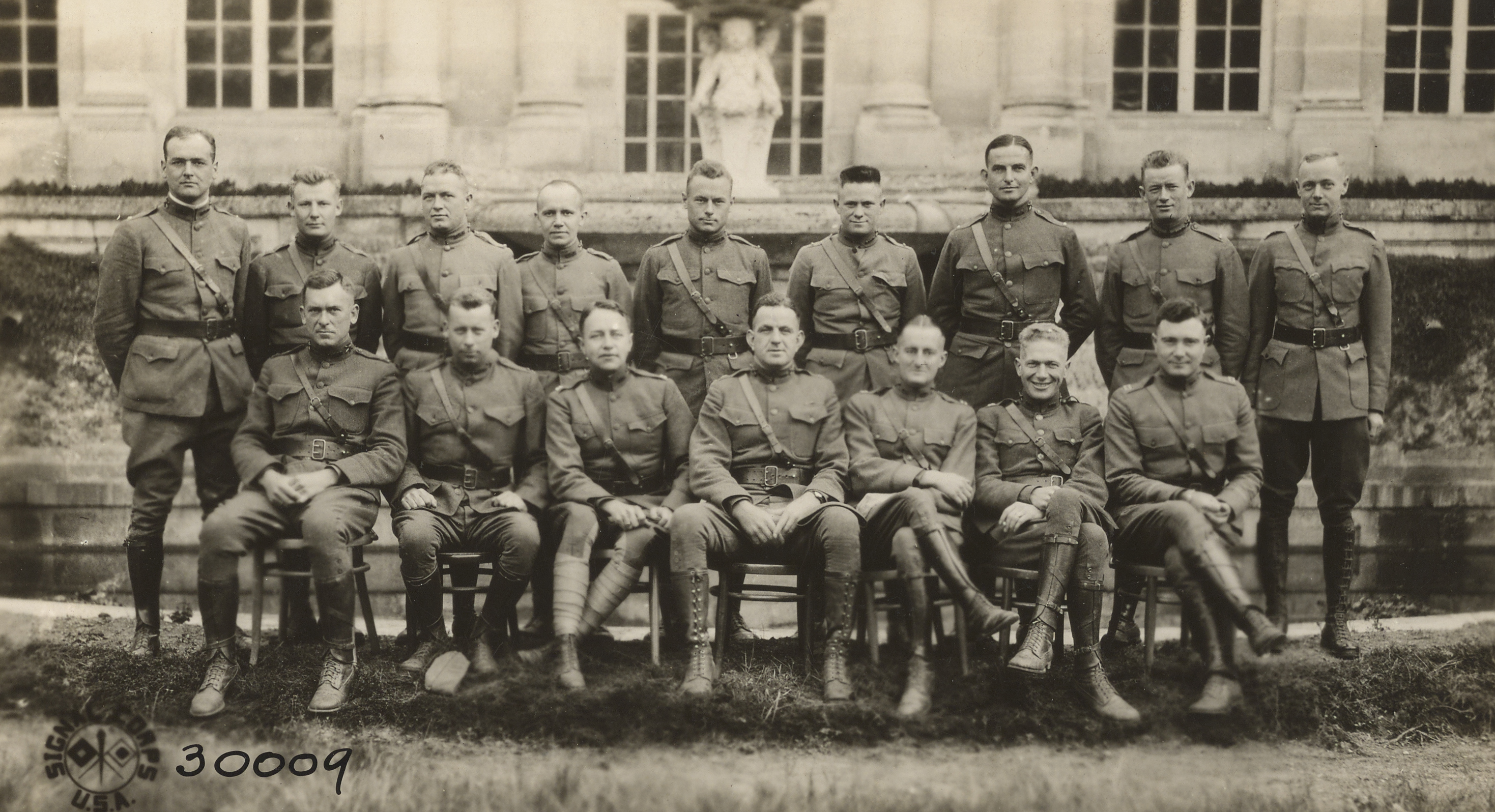
Captain Aaron Bradshaw Jr., in the back row, fifth from the left, along with a group of officers at an anti-aircraft school at Paris, France, October 1918

Aaron Bradshaw Jr. was born on July 1, 1894, in Washington, D.C., as the son of lawyer Aaron Bradshaw and Mary Emma Leech. After graduating from high school, he received an appointment to the United States Military Academy (USMA) at West Point, New York, where he was a member of the Class of 1917.

Bradshaw graduated, 85th in a class of 139, with a Bachelor of Science degree on April 20, 1917, exactly two weeks after the American entry into World War I, and was commissioned as a second lieutenant in the Coast Artillery Corps. He completed his training and embarked for France, where he joined the 3rd Anti-Aircraft Battalion during the air defense of Paris. Bradshaw was later transferred to the 2nd Anti-Aircraft Battalion and participated in the Meuse–Argonne offensive in the fall of 1918.

== Between the wars ==
Following the armistice with Germany on November 11, 1918, which brought a close to hostilities, Bradshaw participated in the occupation of the Rhineland until mid-1919, when he was ordered to England and entered a post-graduate course at the University of Oxford. He later served in a variety of Coast Artillery commands, including with the 59th Coast Artillery Regiment in the Philippine Islands in 1925, and completed the Army Field Artillery School at Fort Sill, Oklahoma.

In August 1936, Bradshaw joined the office of the Chief of Coast Artillery Corps under Major General Archibald H. Sunderland and served as major and editor of the Coast Artillery Journal until October 1940. He was then appointed federal inspector and instructor of the 7th Regiment, New York National Guard, and remained in that capacity until March 1941, when he was appointed deputy for administration, Anti-Aircraft Artillery Training Center at Fort Stewart, Georgia. He was promoted to lieutenant colonel on July 1, 1940.

== World War II ==
Following the Japanese attack on Pearl Harbor, Bradshaw was promoted to the temporary rank of colonel on December 11, 1941, and appointed deputy chief of staff for training at Fort Stewart. With the upcoming Operation Torch, an Anglo–American invasion of French North Africa, he was ordered to England in mid-September 1942 and assumed duty as chief of anti-aircraft section, Allied Force Headquarters, in London under Lieutenant General Dwight D. Eisenhower.

Bradshaw took part in the mentioned landing in French North Africa in November 1942 and was promoted to the temporary rank of brigadier general on April 26, 1943. He then served as chief of anti-aircraft section, U.S. North African theater of operations, for two months, responsible for the anti-aircraft defense of Allied units in North Africa, before joining the headquarters of the newly activated U.S. 7th Army under Lieutenant General George S. Patton in July 1943. For his service during Operation Torch, Bradshaw was decorated with the Legion of Merit.

Following the activation of the 7th Army, Bradshaw participated in the Allied invasion of Sicily in July–August 1943 and also held additional duty as commanding officer of the 34th Anti-Aircraft Artillery Brigade. For his service during the Sicily campaign, he received the Bronze Star Medal.

In December 1943, Bradshaw assumed command of the 35th Anti-Aircraft Artillery Brigade with additional duty as the commanding general of anti-aircraft artillery, French Expeditionary Corps. He served in this capacity during the famous Battle of Monte Cassino in January–March 1943 and then assumed duty as commanding general, anti-aircraft artillery, U.S. Fifth Army, under Lieutenant General Mark W. Clark.

Bradshaw participated in the liberation of Rome and combat on the Gothic Line and in Spring 1945 offensive in Italy until the surrender of Axis troops at Caserta on April 29, 1945. His service with the 5th Army was awarded with the Distinguished Service Medal, the Silver Star and his second Legion of Merit.

The Allies of the United States decorated him with the Order of the British Empire, the Legion of Honour, the Croix de Guerre, the Czechoslovak War Cross 1939–1945, the Order of the Crown of Italy, the Italian Medal of Military Valor, the Order of Saints Maurice and Lazarus, the Papal Lateran Cross and the Sovereign Military Order of Malta.

== Postwar career ==
Following the end of hostilities, Bradshaw took command of the 71st Anti-Aircraft Brigade, tasked with disarming the German 14th Army under General Joachim Lemelsen and placing them into prisoner-of-war camps.

He reverted to the peacetime rank of colonel by the end of December 1945 and was ordered to Berlin, Germany, where he served as deputy chief of plans and operations, Army Service Forces. He was promoted again to brigadier general on January 24, 1948, and assumed duty as chief of plans and operations within Army Service Forces in Berlin. He was promoted to major general on April 28, 1948.

Bradshaw returned to the United States in early 1949 and served as chief of service group, Logistical Division, Department of the Army, in Washington, D.C., and later as chief of service division, Office of the Assistant Chief of Staff for Logistics (G-4), before returning to Europe for duty as assistant chief of staff for logistics (G-4), U.S. European Command, with headquarters in Heidelberg. During his postwar service, Bradshaw received two Army Commendation Medals.

== Retirement ==
His tenure in Europe ended in early 1953 and Bradshaw returned to the United States for retirement. He retired from the Army on February 1, 1953, after almost 36 years of active service and settled in his native Washington, D.C.

Major General Aaron Bradshaw Jr. died on November 8, 1976, aged 82, at Walter Reed Army Hospital and was buried with full military honors at Arlington National Cemetery, Virginia, together with his wife, Gwendoline D. Bradshaw.

== Decorations ==
Here is Major General Bradshaw's ribbon bar:

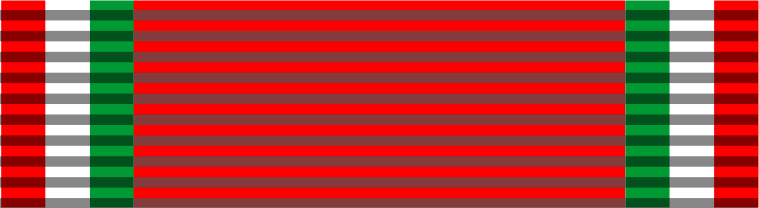

1st Row	Army Distinguished Service Medal		Silver Star	Legion of Merit with Oak Leaf Cluster
2nd Row	Bronze Star Medal	Army Commendation Medal with Oak Leaf Cluster	World War I Victory Medal with two battle clasps	Army of Occupation of Germany Medal
3rd Row	American Defense Service Medal with Clasp	American Campaign Medal	European-African-Middle Eastern Campaign Medal with one silver and one bronze 3/16 inch service stars	World War II Victory Medal
4th Row	Army of Occupation Medal	National Defense Service Medal	Commander of the Most Excellent Order of the British Empire	Officer of the Legion of Honor (France)
5th Row	French Croix de guerre 1939-1945 with Palm	Czechoslovak War Cross 1939–1945	Papal Lateran Cross	Order of Saints Maurice and Lazarus, Commander (Italy)
6th Row	Order of the Crown of Italy, Commander (Italy)	Silver Medal of Military Valor (Italy)	Sovereign Military Order of Malta, 1st Class	Italian Patriot's Medal
