= Lauretan Cross =

Lauretan Cross Loreto Cross
- Type: Three degree medal (Gold, Silver, and Bronze)
- Awarded for: Merit in relation to the Basilica della Santa Casa; Donations to the sanctuary
- Country: Holy See
- Presented by: Roman Catholic Territorial Prelature of Loreto with authorisation of The Holy See
- Status: Obsolete
- Established: November 26, 1888
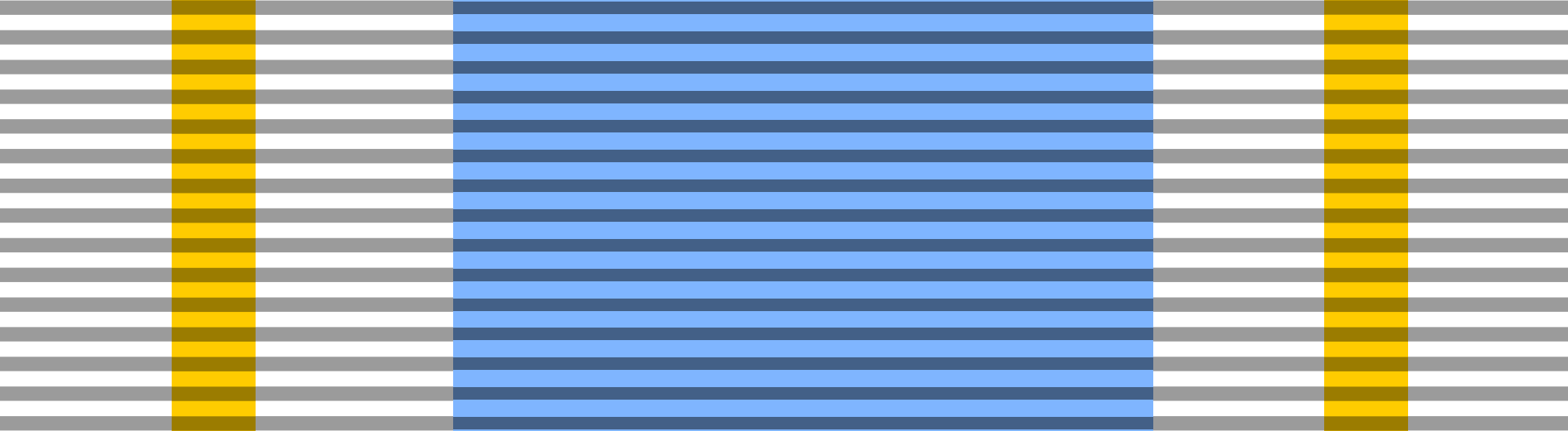
- Ribbon of the Lauretan Cross 1st Class

Precedence
- Next (higher): Benemerenti Medal
- Equivalent: Jerusalem Pilgrim's Cross; Lateran Cross

The Lauretan Cross was a decoration for recognition of support to the Holy House of Loreto in 1888. It was bestowed by the Roman Catholic Territorial Prelature of Loreto with authorisation of the Holy See.

== History ==
The Lauretan Cross was supposed to continue the legacy of the short-lived Order of the Knights of Loreto. Its task was to fight the highwaymen who harassed the surrounding area of the sanctuary and the pilgrims in the Romagna. The order was founded in 1586 by Leo X and already dissolved as a chivalric order and limited only to the members of the cathedral chapter of the Holy House of Loreto in 1588.

To commemorate the third centenary of the conversion, Leo XIII allowed the Bishop of Loreto to honor suitable persons on 26 November 1888. The decoration was awarded for donations for the Basilica della Santa Casa or merit in relation to the sanctuary. Furthermore, indulgences were granted for obtaining the decoration.

The Lauretan Cross was in abeyance in 1983 but might have been abolished earlier under Paul VI.

== Appearance ==
The decoration consists of an eight-pointed cross and a medallion with the image of the Lady of Loreto in the middle which is similar to the medal of the Order of the Knights of Loreto. A golden ribbon winds between the four arms of the cross. Members of the cathedral chapter of Loreto wore the cross suspended on a cord.

The three classes of the Lauretan Cross (with their ribbons) are:

- 1st class: golden cross with blue enameled cross arms and white enameled medallion; blue ribbon with two white stripes on the border which have a thin yellow line in the middle; worn around the neck
- 2nd class: golden cross with blue enameled cross arms and white enameled medallion; the ribbon is red, with delicate lines of white and yellow on each border; worn on the left side of the breast
- 3rd class: cross entirely made of gilded bronze; the ribbon is red, with delicate lines of white and yellow on each border; worn on the left side of the breast

Stamped on the reverse side are the words "BENEMERENTIBUS QUIBUS CORDI EST DECOR DOMUS LAURETANAE", "VIRIS LECTISSIMUS QUIBUS CORDI EST DECOR DOMUS LAURETANAE" or "FEMINIS LECTISSIMUS QUIBUS CORDI".

== See also ==
- List of ecclesiastical decorations
