= John J. Coppinger =

US Army major general

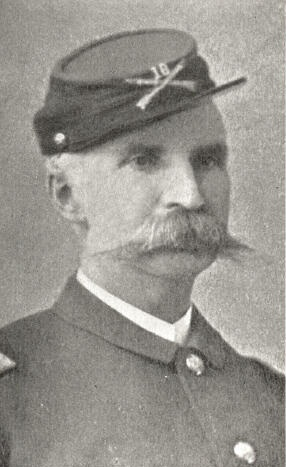
- Coppinger c. 1883
- Born: October 11, 1834; Cobh, County Cork, Ireland
- Died: November 4, 1909 (aged 75); Washington, D.C., US
- Burial place: Arlington National Cemetery
- Spouse: Alice Stanwood Blaine (m. 1883–1890)
- Children: 2
- Relatives: James G. Blaine (father-in-law); Walker Blaine (brother-in-law)
- Military career
- Allegiance: Great Britain; Papal States; Union (American Civil War); United States
- Service: British Army; Papal Army; Union Army; United States Army
- Service years: 1855–1860 (British Army); 1861 (Papal Army); 1861–1866 (Union Army); 1866–1898 (United States Army)
- Rank: Major General
- Unit: U.S. Army Infantry Branch
- Commands: 15th New York Volunteer Cavalry Regiment; Company A, 23rd Infantry Regiment; Fort Reno; Fort Gibson; 23rd Infantry Regiment; Fourth Army Corps
- Wars: American Civil War; American Indian Wars; Spanish–American War
- Awards: Order of St. Gregory the Great (Knight) (Papal States); Pro Petri Sede (Papal States)

John Joseph Coppinger (11 October 1834 – 4 November 1909) was a career officer in the United States Army. A native of Ireland, in 1855 he joined a unit of the Warwickshire Militia that was being raised in England for service in the Crimean War. The war ended in 1856, before Coppinger's unit saw combat. He resigned in 1860, then joined the military of the Papal States during the Pope's effort to oppose Italian unification. Coppinger was taken prisoner during the conflict and held in Austria, then returned to Ireland after his release. In September 1861, Coppinger traveled to the United States and received a Union Army commission as a captain in the 14th Infantry Regiment. He served through the end of the American Civil War and was wounded during the August 1862 Second Battle of Bull Run.

After convalescing from his wounds, Coppinger returned to duty with the 14th Infantry. He received brevet promotion to major for his performance at the June 1864 Battle of Trevilian Station and lieutenant colonel for his heroism in the October 1864 Battle of Cedar Creek. In January 1865, Coppinger was promoted to colonel and appointed to command the 15th New York Volunteer Cavalry Regiment; he remained in command until the end of the war in April 1865 and was wounded at the 9 April Battle of Appomattox Court House.

After the Civil War, Coppinger joined the United States Army as a captain of the 23rd Infantry Regiment. He served in the western United States during the American Indian Wars, and he was promoted to major in the 10th Infantry Regiment in March 1879 and lieutenant colonel of the 18th Infantry Regiment in October 1883. He was promoted to colonel in January 1891 and assigned to command the 23rd Infantry Regiment.

In April 1895, Coppinger was promoted to brigadier general and assigned to command the Department of the Platte. At the start of the Spanish–American War in April 1898, he was promoted to major general of United States Volunteers and assigned to command the 1st Independent Division with headquarters in Mobile, Alabama. The organization was subsequently designated as the Fourth Army Corps. Coppinger's corps was slated for deployment during the Puerto Rico campaign, but the end of the war came before the Fourth Army Corps departed the United States.

Coppinger left the army upon reaching the mandatory retirement age of 64 in October 1898. In retirement, he resided in Washington, D.C. He died in Washington on 4 November 1909. Coppinger was buried at Arlington National Cemetery.

== Early life ==
John Joseph Coppinger was born in Cobh, County Cork, Ireland on 11 October 1834, a son of William J. Coppinger and Margaret (O'Brien) Coppinger. He was raised and educated at private schools in County Cork, and in September 1855 he joined the 1st Regiment of the Warwickshire Militia. Commissioned as an ensign, Coppinger anticipated serving overseas during the Crimean War. The war ended in 1856, before his regiment could leave England. Coppinger was promoted to lieutenant in November 1857.

In November 1860, Coppinger resigned from the British Army. Later that year, he and other Irish recruits joined the military of the Papal States during Pope Pius IX's fight to keep his domain independent during the wars of Italian unification. Coppinger served as a captain in command of Second Company, St. Patrick's Battalion and took part in fighting including a battle at Rocca Paolina in Perugia, for which he received the Order of St. Gregory the Great (Knight) and the Pro Petri Sede medal from the Pope. Coppinger was taken prisoner during this fight and was held in Austria until the end of the conflict in 1861. He returned briefly to Ireland, then traveled to the United States, where in September 1861 he was commissioned as a captain in the Union Army. Coppinger was one of several Irishmen with military experience, including Myles Keogh, who responded to Archbishop of New York John Hughes's efforts to recruit Irish soldiers for the Union Army.

== Continued career ==
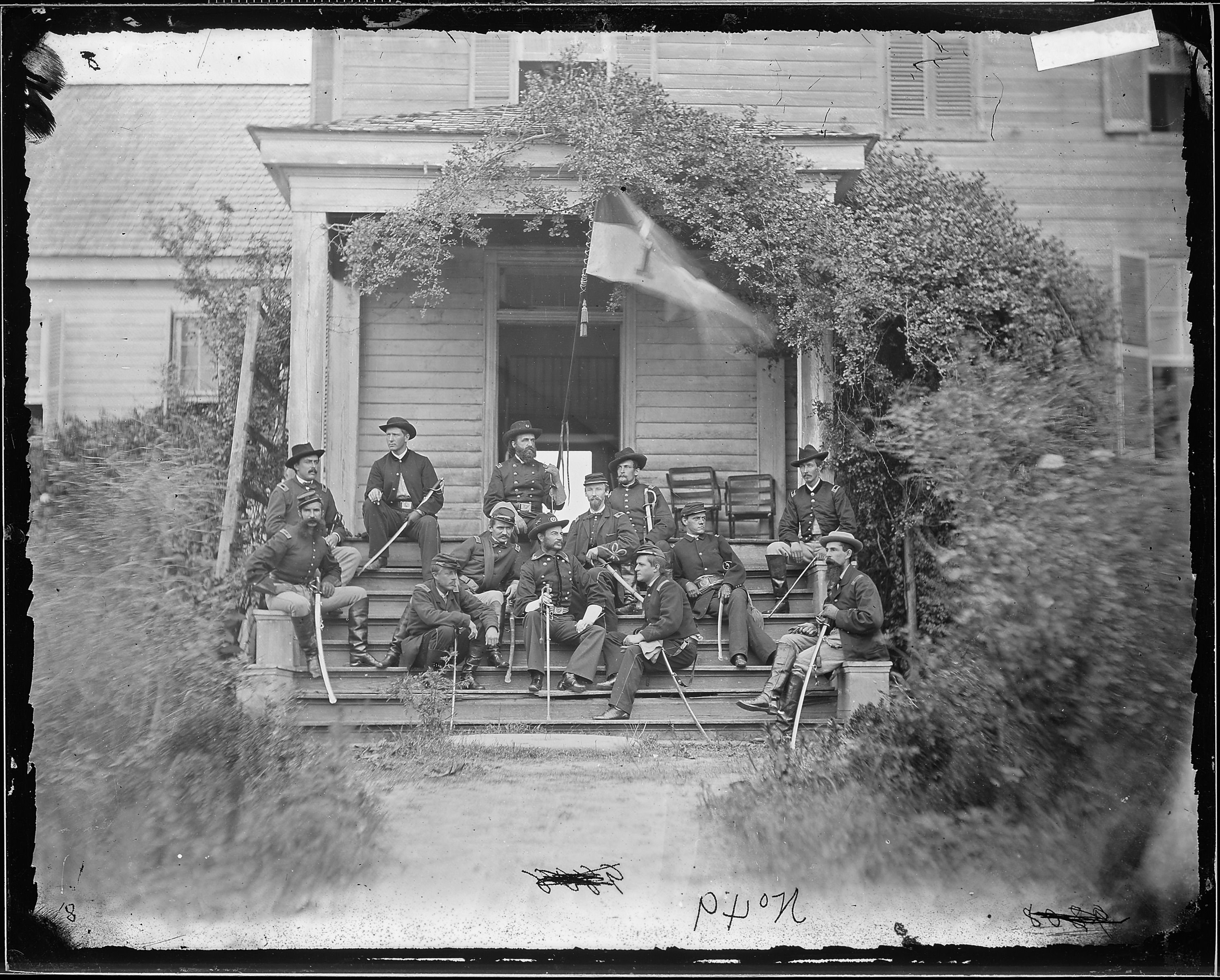
Coppinger (far left, front) with General Alfred T. A. Torbert and other members of Torbert's staff

Assigned to the 14th Infantry Regiment during the American Civil War, Coppinger was wounded during the August 1862 Second Battle of Bull Run. He returned to duty after convalescing and served on the staff of Alfred Thomas Archimedes Torbert, the commander of 1st Division, Cavalry Corps, Army of the Potomac. The subsequent engagements in which he took part included the Battle of Chancellorsville, Battle of Gettysburg, Battle of Mine Run, Battle of the Wilderness, Battle of Yellow Tavern, Battle of Meadow Bridge, Battle of Hanover Crossing, Battle of Haw's Shop, Battle of Old Church, Battle of Cold Harbor, Battle of Trevilian Station, First Battle of Deep Bottom, Second Battle of Deep Bottom, Battle of Newtown, Third Battle of Winchester, Battle of Shepherdstown, Battle of Smithfield, Battle of Fisher's Hill, Battle of Waynesboro, Virginia, Battle of Tom's Brook, Battle of Cedar Creek, Battle of Liberty Mills, Battle of Five Forks, and Battle of Appomattox Court House.

In January 1865, Coppinger received promotion to colonel and was assigned to command the 15th New York Volunteer Cavalry Regiment; he remained in command through the end of the war in April 1865. Coppinger was wounded in the April 1865 fighting at Appomattox Courthouse, and received brevet promotion to major for his performance at Trevilian Station in June 1864. He received brevet promotion to lieutenant colonel for his heroism at Cedar Creek in October 1864.

== Continued career ==
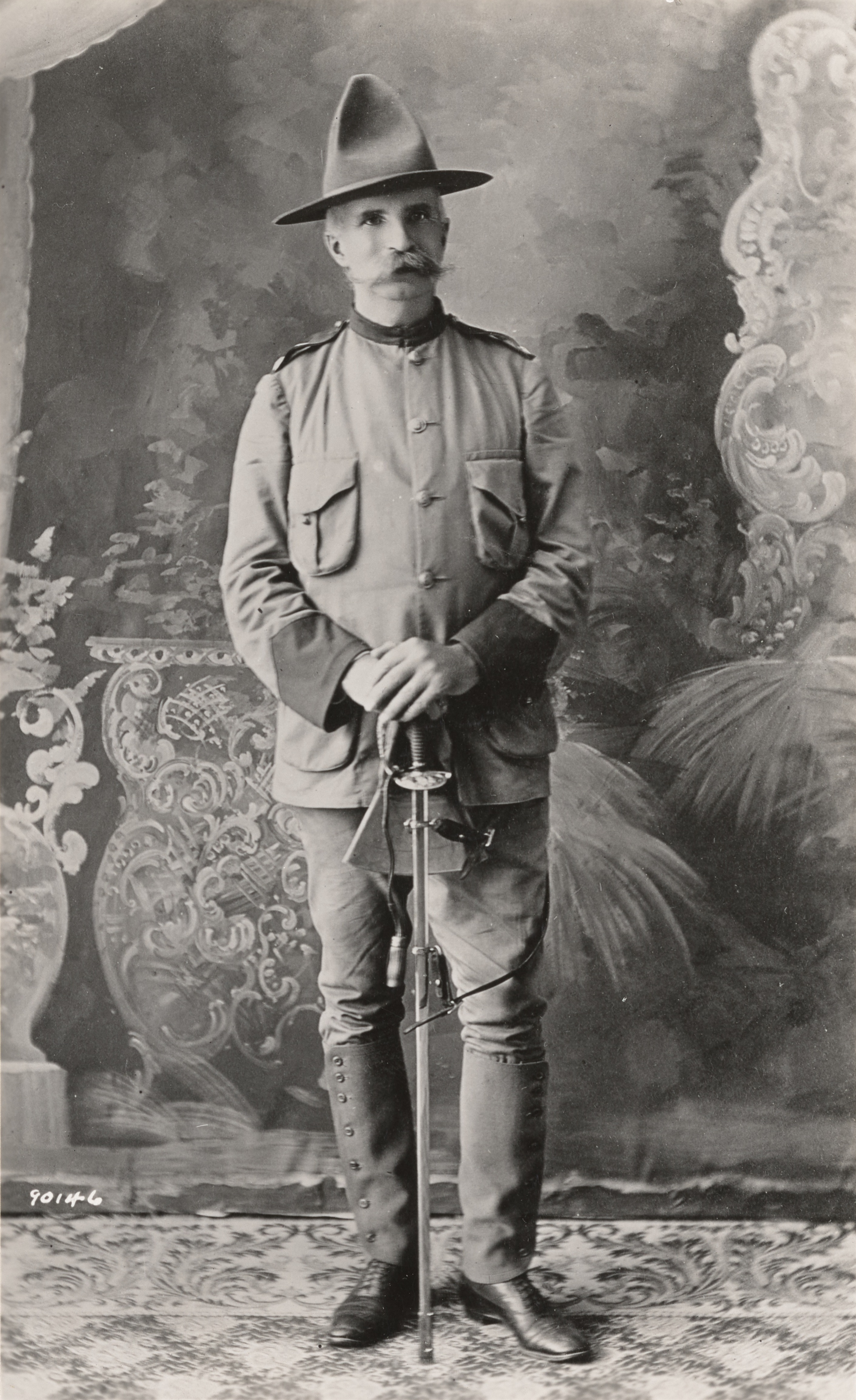
Coppinger at the time of the Spanish–American War

After the war, Coppinger joined the United States Army as a captain in the 23rd Infantry Regiment and was assigned to command the regiment's Company A. He served in the western United States during the American Indian Wars, including command of two companies and the post at Camp Three Forks Owyhee, Idaho. He led several skirmishes against hostile American Indians in 1866, 1867, and 1868, and in 1869 received brevet promotion to colonel in recognition of his heroism. In the mid-1870s, Coppinger commanded the post at Fort Reno, Indian Territory. In March 1879, Coppinger was promoted to major in the 10th Infantry Regiment, and in October 1883, he received promotion to lieutenant colonel of the 18th Infantry Regiment. For several years, Coppinger served as acting inspector general of the Department of the Missouri, which was commanded by Major General John Pope.

=== Family ===
In February 1883, Coppinger married Alice Stanwood Blaine (1861–1890), the daughter of Harriet (Stanwood) Blaine and James G. Blaine. The wedding took place at the Cathedral of St. Matthew the Apostle in Washington, D.C. and was performed by the Reverend Doctor Placidus L. Chappelle. Attendees included President Chester A. Arthur, who postponed a cabinet meeting so the cabinet secretaries could attend. Others in attendance included: many members of the diplomatic corps; J. Warren Keifer, the Speaker of the U.S. House; several members of the United States Supreme Court; Colonel Robert G. Ingersoll; William T. Sherman, the Commanding General of the United States Army; and Admiral John Lorimer Worden. Alice Blaine Coppinger died in 1890, and they were the parents of two sons, Blaine and Conor.

== Later career ==
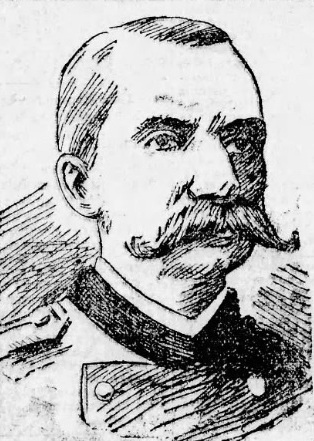
Coppinger in May 1898

From October 1886 to July 1888, Coppinger commanded Fort Gibson, Indian Territory. In October 1890, he was detailed to Paris to observe the French military's methods for training and professional education. He was promoted to colonel in January 1891 and returned to the United States the following April, when he was assigned to command the 23rd Infantry Regiment. While in this post, Coppinger worked with military and civilian officials in Wyoming to coordinate the army and government responses to the Bannock War of 1895.

In April 1895, Coppinger was promoted to brigadier general and assigned to command the Department of the Platte. The brigadier general's vacancy had occurred when Wesley Merritt was promoted to major general; Coppinger's promotion was controversial because he was promoted ahead of 28 colonels who were senior to him. His advancement was also protested by the anti-immigrant, anti-Catholic American Protective Association, led by W. J. H. Traynor. Despite receiving anti-Coppinger petitions from several local APA chapters, the nomination was unanimously reported out of the senate's Military Affairs Committee, and was confirmed by the full senate 46 votes to 17 in April 1896.

When the Spanish–American War broke out in April 1898, he was promoted to major general of United States Volunteers and assigned to command the 1st Independent Division, which underwent organization and training in Mobile, Alabama. This command was later reorganized as the Fourth Army Corps. The corps was intended for overseas service during the Puerto Rico campaign, but the war ended before it embarked for transport to Puerto Rico.

In October 1898, Coppinger reached the mandatory retirement age of 64 and left the army. After retiring, he resided in Washington, D.C. Coppinger died in Washington on 4 November 1909. His funeral took place at St. Matthew's, and pallbearers included Theodore Schwan, Robert Maitland O'Reilly, Francis Munroe Ramsay, Clarence Ransom Edwards, Robert Temple Emmet, Frank McIntyre, and Harry M. Clabaugh. Coppinger was buried at Arlington National Cemetery.
