= Order of Saint Righteous Grand Duke Dmitry Donskoy =

Order awarded by the Russian Orthodox Church

Order of Saint Righteous Grand Duke Dmitry Donskoy Орден Святого благоверного великого князя Димитрия Донского
- Presented by: Russian Orthodox Church
- Status: Active
- Established: 1 October 2004

Precedence
- Next (higher): Order of St. Innocent, Metropolitan of Moscow and Kolomna
- Next (lower): Order of St. Macarius, Metropolitan of Moscow

The Order of Saint Righteous Grand Duke Dmitry Donskoy is an award of the Russian Orthodox Church. It was created on 1 October 2004 by Patriarch Alexiy II and the Holy Synod as a means of marking courageous service to the Russian state or contributions to cooperation between the Russian Orthodox Church and the Russian Armed Forces, providing spiritual and moral support for servicemen and women in active or reserve service, as well as retired servicemen. Typical recipients are clerics, generals and veterans of the Great Patriotic War, although other persons are not barred.

The order is awarded in three classes.

== See also ==
- List of ecclesiastical decorations
