= Participation trophy =

Trophy given to children who participate regardless of outcome

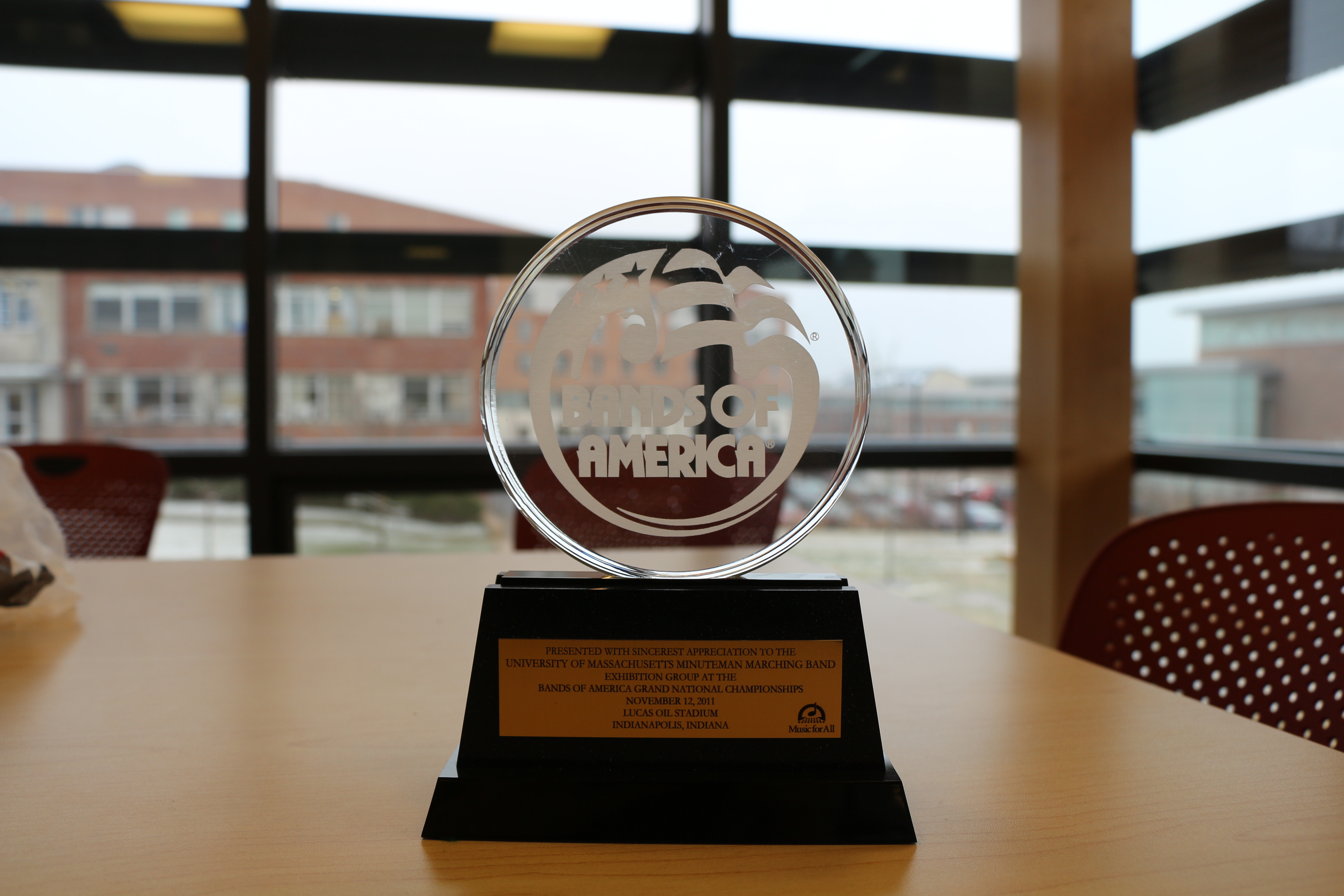
A participation trophy

A participation trophy is a trophy given to participants in a competition, usually children, regardless of their success. One of the first known mentions of participation trophies occurred on February 8, 1922, in a Massillon, Ohio newspaper, The Evening Independent, in an article announcing a high school basketball tournament. The Olympics issue participation medals to athletes and support staff, event officials, and certain volunteers. Military equivalents are the service medal, the campaign medal, and marksmanship qualification badges.

== Justification ==
Defenders argue that participation trophies teach children that trying their best is good enough, even if they do not win. They assert that providing participation trophies raises children's self-esteem, and ensures they do not feel left out, or inferior to their peers who won. It also increases the likelihood that a child will want to return to play other sports in the hope of getting another trophy.

Such trophies are relatively inexpensive, and encourage egalitarianism and continued striving towards a goal; according to Mother Jones, working class families tend to favor them as they "tend to think everyone should be recognized". They cited a 2014 poll by Reason, which found that Americans with incomes of under $30,000 a year were more likely to support participation trophies than those with higher incomes. Mother Jones pointed to ribbons given by the US government to all personnel involved in surface combat as an example of participation awards.

== Critique ==
Critics argue that such trophies promote narcissism and an entitlement mentality among recipients, and are based on incorrect assumptions regarding supposed psychological benefits of self-esteem. Critics also note that some children do not value them as much as they do trophies given only to winners. A backlash against participation trophies intensified in the 1990s.

Jordon Roos and Brad Strand hold that participation trophies do not allow children to learn from failures; losing enables them to learn a lesson from their loss, such as that losing is a part of life.

According to the 2014 Reason poll regarding children's sports, 57 percent of Americans believed that only winning players should receive a trophy, while 40 percent believed that all team participants should receive a trophy." White Americans believed by a 63% to 34% margin that only winners should receive trophies, while black and Hispanic Americans believed by a 56% to 42% margin that all participants should receive trophies. There were also differences by political affiliation, with Republicans opposing participation trophies by 66% to 31%, and Democrats evenly divided at 48% each.

== See also ==
- Self esteem
- Competition
- Sport
- Game
