= Order of Saint Nicholas (Melkite Greek Catholic Eparchy of Newton) =

The Order of Saint Nicholas is a lay order founded in 1991 by Bishop Ignatius Ghattas, attached to the Melkite Greek Catholic Eparchy of Newton of the Melkite Greek Catholic Church in Massachusetts, United States. Its now dissolved forerunner organization, the Saint Nicholas Guild, was founded in 1980 by the bishop's predecessor, Archbishop Joseph Tawil.

Officially as an unincorporated auxiliary of the Melkite Greek Catholic Eparchy of Newton, it is a non-profit corporation under the General Laws of the Commonwealth of Massachusetts.

The Order's National Chairpeople are George Mussalli and Dr. Sherine Rabbat.

== See also ==
- List of ecclesiastical decorations
