= Order of Saint Nicholas (Georgia) =

Civilian Award of Georgia

Order of Saint Nicholas წმინდა ნიკოლოზის ორდენი
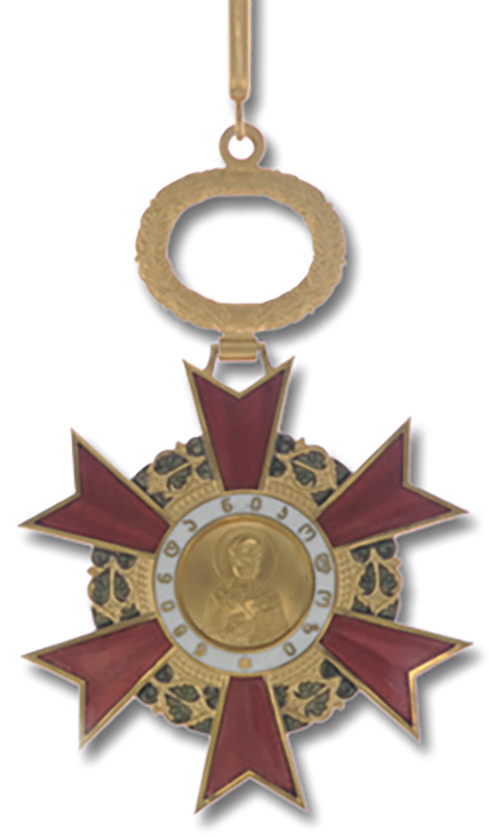
- Order of Saint Nicholas

Awarded by Georgia
- Type: Single grade order
- Established: July 31, 2009

Precedence
- Next (higher): Presidential Order of Excellence
- Next (lower): Order of the Golden Fleece
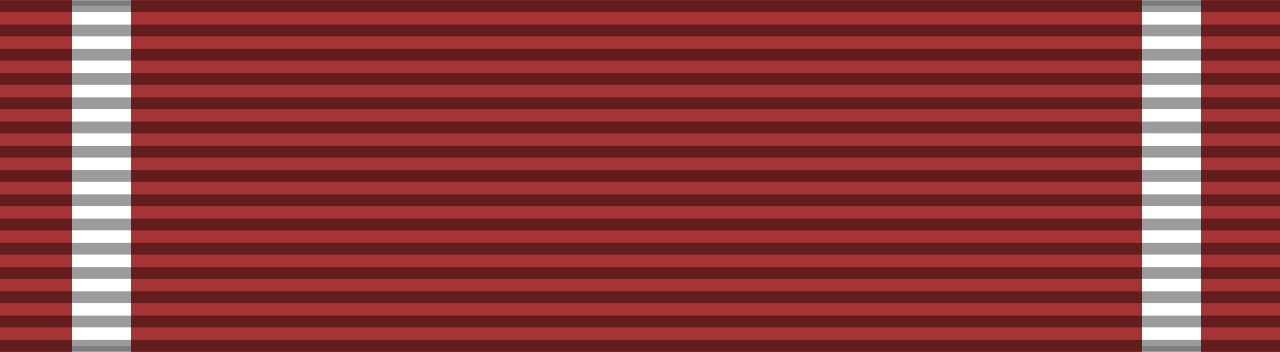
- Ribbon bar

The Order of Saint Nicholas (Georgian: წმინდა ნიკოლოზის ორდენი, romanized: ts'minda nik'olozis ordeni) is an honor awarded by the President of Georgia . Established on July 31, 2009, in accordance with parliamentary decree number 1553, the Order of St. Nicholas is awarded to individuals for outstanding charitable or social activities in free service to the country and the people.

== Insignia ==
The Order of St. Nicholas is a golden star. Obverse of the Order: In the big star, burgundy enamel dominates. The ends are golden, with green and gold enamel as the background. In the center of the star is a relief depicting St. Nicholas. Around it is used white enamel with the inscription "St. Nicholas", the edge of which is decorated with ornaments. The star is attached to the hoop ring by a moving gold stalk. The gold ring is rigidly attached to the bracket. The bracelet ring is gold. Reverse of the Order: In the center of the reverse, on a golden background, is embossed the Coat of Arms of Georgia. The ribbon of the Order is red and white.

== See also ==
- Orders, decorations, and medals of Georgia
