= Ignatius Ghattas =

Palestinian Catholic prelate (1920–1992)

His Excellency, The Most Reverend Ignatius Ghattas BS
- Bishop
- Church: Melkite Greek Catholic
- See: Eparchy of Newton, Massachusetts
- In office: 23 February 1990—11 October 1992
- Predecessor: Joseph Tawil
- Successor: John Elya

Orders
- Ordination: 1946
- Consecration: 23 February 1990

Personal details
- Born: 25 December 1920 Maaloul, Mandatory Palestine
- Died: 11 October 1992 (aged 71) Cleveland, Ohio, U.S.

Ignatius Ghattas, BS (25 December 1920 — 11 October 1992) was a Palestinian Catholic prelate who served as Eparch of Newton in the Melkite Greek Catholic Church from 1990 to 1992. He was a member of the Basilian Salvatorian Order.

== Biography ==
Ghattas was born in Nazareth in 1920 and raised in Maaloul. He entered Holy Saviour monastery in Saida, Lebanon following his primary education and professed his religious vows in 1939. He was ordained a priest of the Basilian Salvatorian Order in 1946. Following his ordination he taught Greek, Latin, English, French and mathematics.

In 1952, he went to the United States to serve as assistant pastor of St. Elias parish in Cleveland, Ohio, and was appointed pastor in 1955. Later he was elected bishop by the Holy Synod of the Melkite Church in July 1989 and approved by the Holy See on December 11. He was consecrated bishop on February 23, 1990, succeeding Archbishop Joseph Tawil as eparch.

Ghattas founded the Order of Saint Nicholas in 1991, a regional lay order attached to the Melkite Greek Catholic Eparchy of Newton.

He died in Cleveland, Ohio, in 1992, aged 71.

== See also ==
- Melkite Greek Catholic Eparchy of Newton
- Melkite Greek Catholic Church
