= Ecclesiastical decoration =

Order or decoration conferred by a head of a church

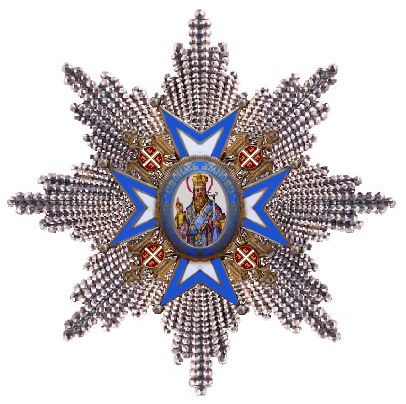
Star of Order of St. Sava

An ecclesiastical decoration is an order or a decoration conferred by a head of a church.

== Catholic ecclesiastical decorations ==
=== Orders, decorations, and medals of the Holy See ===
Award	Notes
Blessed sword and hat	Gift offered by popes to Catholic monarchs or other secular recipients in recognition of their defense of Christendom
Golden Rose	Conferred as a token of reverence or affection to churches and sanctuaries, royalty, military figures, and governments
Fidei et Virtuti	Decoration for military merit bestowed by the Holy See during the Italian unification
Pro Petri Sede	Decoration for military merit bestowed by the Holy See in the Second Italian War of Independence
Benemerenti medal	For long and exceptional service to the Catholic Church
Jerusalem Pilgrim's Cross	Support for Christian holy sites during a pilgrimage to the Holy Land
Lauretan Cross	Merit in relation to the Basilica della Santa Casa
Papal Lateran Cross	Recognition of merit bestowed by the Cathedral chapter of the Archbasilica of Saint John Lateran with authorization of the Holy See.
Per Artem ad Deum Medal	Presented by the Pontifical Council for Culture in recognition of the achievements which contribute to the promotion of dialogue between the diversity of cultures in the contemporary world and thus promote man as an individual
Pro Ecclesia et Pontifice	Conferred for distinguished service to the Roman Catholic Church by lay people and clergy

=== Other Catholic distinctions ===
Award	Presented by	Recognizes
James Cardinal Gibbons Medal	Catholic University of America	Distinguished and meritorious service to the Roman Catholic Church, the United States of America, or The Catholic University of America
John Courtney Murray Award	Catholic Theological Society of America	Work on religious liberty
Laetare Medal	University of Notre Dame	Outstanding service to the Catholic Church and society
Order of Saint Ignatius of Antioch	Syriac Catholic Church	Lay order. Recognised as legitimate ecclesiastical decorations by the International Commission on Orders of Chivalry (2006):
Order of Saint Michael (Bavaria)	Archbishop of Cologne	Military order
Order of Saint Nicholas (Melkite Greek Catholic Eparchy of Newton)	Melkite Greek Catholic Eparchy of Newton	Lay order
Pacem in Terris Award	Quad Cities Pacem in Terris Coalition	Individual achievements in peace and justice, not only in their country but in the world
Patriarchal Order of the Holy Cross of Jerusalem	Melkite Catholic Patriarchate of Antioch	Promote Catholic faith and to support religious, cultural and social works of the Melkite Greek Catholic Church in the Holy Land. Recognised as legitimate ecclesiastical decorations by the International Commission on Orders of Chivalry (2006):
Patronal Medal	Catholic University of America, Basilica of the National Shrine of the Immaculate Conception	Distinguished service in the advancement of Marian devotion, theology, or general appreciation of the place of Mary in the life of the Catholic Church
Paul VI Prize	Paul VI Institute	Individuals or institutions who, with their studies and their works, have contributed to the growth of the religious meaning in the world
Ratzinger Prize	Ratzinger Foundation	Those who perform promising scholarly research relating to or expounding upon Pope Benedict XVI's work
Saint Albert Award	Society of Catholic Scientists	To a Catholic scientist whose life and work give witness to the harmony that exists between the vocation of scientist and the life of faith

=== Local ecclesiastical distinctions ===
- Jerusalem Pilgrim's Cross, established in 1901, conferred in the name of the Sovereign Pontiff at the office of the Custody of the Holy Land of the Order of Friars Minor in Jerusalem, Israel
- Cross of Honour of the Abbot of Lilienfeld, founded in 1980, of the Abbot of Lilienfeld, Austria
- Order of Saint Nicholas, a regional lay order founded in 1991 by Bishop Ignatius Ghattas of the Melkite Greek Catholic Eparchy of Newton
- Medal, Great Cross, and Golden Order of the Maronite General Council of the Maronite Church
- Order Cross of Saint Thomas the Apostle (Ordem Cruz de São Tomé Apóstolo) of the Roman Catholic Diocese of São Tomé and Príncipe

== Eastern Orthodox ecclesiastical decorations ==
Several autocephalous churches of the Eastern Orthodox communion award ecclesiastical decorations.

Award	Given by	Recognizes
Archons of the Ecumenical Patriarchate	Ecumenical Patriarch of Constantinople	Laity for service to those portions of the Eastern Orthodox Church under the patriarch's particular guidance. The archons are organized in two orders: The "Order of Saint Andrew" (est. 1966) for Archons subject to the Greek Orthodox Archdiocese of America; The "Brotherhood of the Most Holy Lady Pammakaristos" (est. 1991) for the rest of the world
Order of Holy Prince Daniel of Moscow	Russian Orthodox Church	Services in the revival of spiritual life in Russia
Order of Saint Righteous Grand Duke Dmitry Donskoy	Russian Orthodox Church	Courageous service to the Russian state or contributions to cooperation between the Russian Orthodox Church and the Russian Armed Forces
Order of St. Sava	Serbian Orthodox Church	Meritorious achievements in the arts, science, education and religion
Patriarchal Cross of Romania	Romanian Orthodox Church	Ecclesiastical service

Others include:

- The Byzantine Order of the Holy Sepulchre, awarded by the Greek Orthodox Church of Jerusalem.
- The Order of the Holy Lamb (est. 1935), awarded by the Finnish Orthodox Church.
- The Order of Bishop Platon (est. 1922), awarded by the Estonian Apostolic Orthodox Church.

== Protestant ==
- Order of Military Merit for Protestant Officer's, rewarded to Protestants officers within the Royal French Army regardless of denomination.
- German Protestant Women’s Aid Badge

=== Anglican Communion ===
In addition to the Lambeth degree, the Archbishop of Canterbury awards the following to recognise outstanding service in various fields.

- Archbishop of Canterbury's Award for Outstanding Service to the Anglican Communion
- Cross of St Augustine for contributions to the life of the worldwide Communion, or to a particular autonomous church within Anglicanism, or members of other traditions who have made a conspicuous contribution to ecumenism
- Lambeth Cross for Ecumenism
- Canterbury Cross for Services to the Church of England
- Archbishop's Awards for ministry priority areas (six awards named after former Archbishops of Canterbury)
  - Dunstan Award for Prayer and the Religious Life
  - Hubert Walter Award for Reconciliation and Interfaith Cooperation
  - Alphege Award for Evangelism and Witness
  - Lanfranc Award for Education and Scholarship
  - Langton Award for Community Service
  - Cranmer Award for Worship

=== Methodism ===
- Honourable Order of Jerusalem, the highest distinction presented by the World Methodist Council. It is conferred for exceptional service to the Methodist Church.
- Order of Saint Luke
- Wesley Guild Medal

=== Lutheran ===
Award	Reference
400 Year Anniversary Of The Lutheran Bible Badge	
“Thüringer Day Of Bach And Lutherans” Celebration Badge	
Day of Lutherans Badge	
Martin Luther commemorative day badge	
Luther Theatre Festival Badge	
Cathedral of St. Johannes and St. Donati Star	
Jerusalem Cross	

== See also ==
- Ecclesiastical award
- List of religion-related awards
