= Papal Lateran Cross =

Medal for recognition of merit bestowed by the Catholic Church

Lateran Cross Croce Lateranense
- Type: Three degree medal (Gold, Silver, and Bronze)
- Awarded for: Support for the restoration of the Lateran Basilica
- Presented by: (Vatican City) Cathedral chapter of the Archbasilica of Saint John Lateran with authorisation of the Holy See
- Status: Obsolete
- Established: February 18, 1903
- Final award: 1977
- Ribbon of the Lateran Cross

Precedence
- Next (higher): Benemerenti Medal
- Equivalent: Jerusalem Pilgrim's Cross; Lauretan Cross

The Lateran Cross (Italian: Croce Lateranense) is a medal for recognition of merit. It was bestowed by the Cathedral chapter of the Archbasilica of Saint John Lateran with authorisation of the Holy See.

== History ==
The Lateran Cross was commissioned by Pope Leo XIII, and instituted on February 18, 1903. The distinction was created as a recognition of merit, and is named in honor of the Basilica of St. John in Lateran in Rome. Initially, it was awarded for donations regarding the restoration of the Lateran Basilica.

The distribution of the award was continued after the completion of the restoration process. Paul VI ended the awarding of the Lateran Cross in 1977.

== Appearance ==
The decoration consists of a Greek cross displaying the image of St. John the Evangelist on the right, St. John the Baptist on the left, St. Peter at top, and St. Paul at the bottom. Christ the Redeemer is displayed at the center of the cross. The reverse side of the cross is engraved with the names, in Latin, of each saint depicted (Joanes, Batis, Petrus, Paulus), as well as the symbol of Christ (P and X inside a circle).

A button located above the cross is inscribed with the phrase: Sacrosancta lateranensis ecclesia - omnium urbis et orbis ecclesiarum mater et caput (The sacred and holy church of the Lateran - the mother and the head of all of the churches of the city and the world).

The medal has been crafted in a number of designs: with or without an adjoining circle, as well as a solid medal with a cross in relief. The accompanying ribbon is red with blue stripes along the sides.

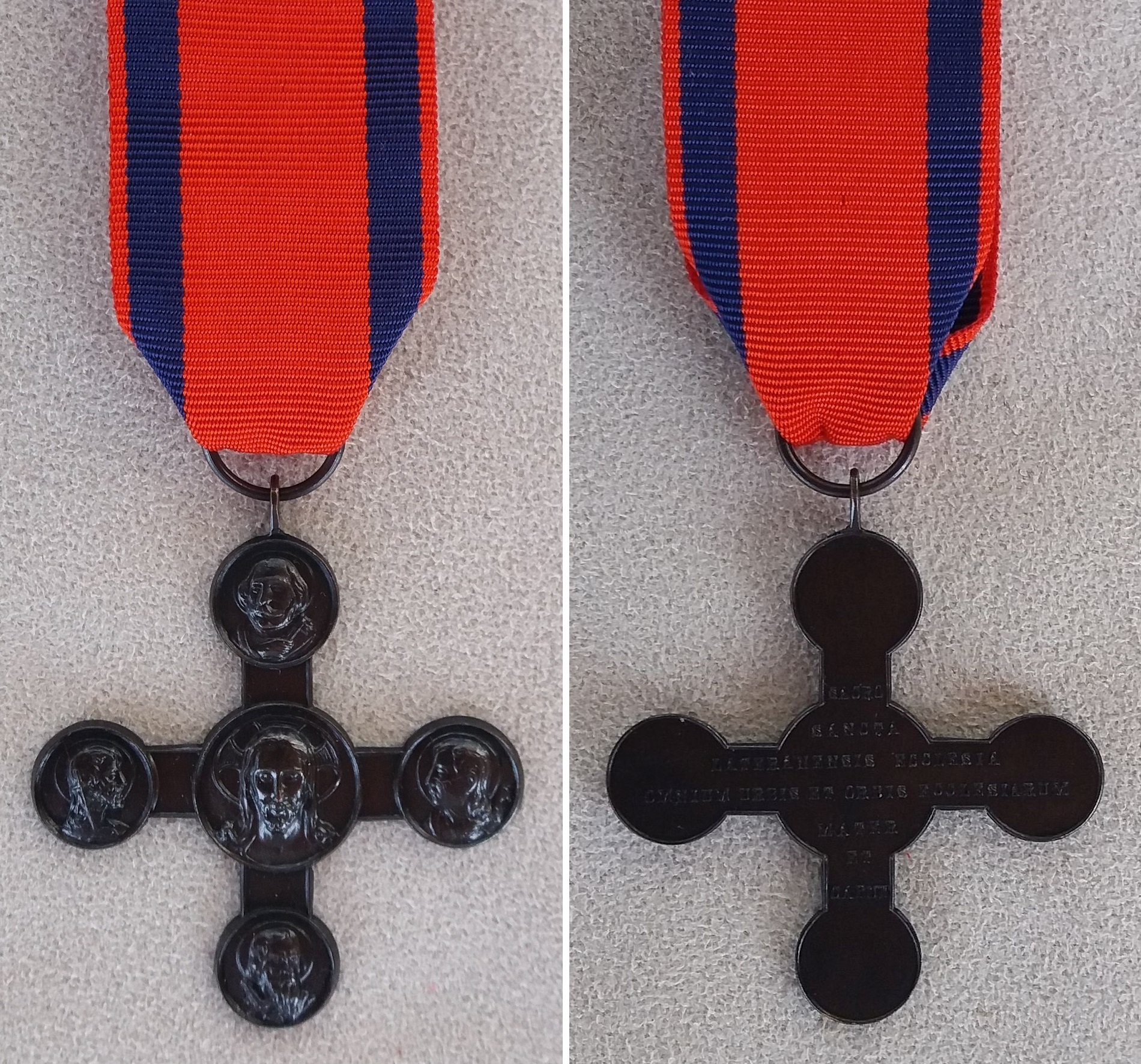
Papal Lateran Cross (1st design) in Bronze

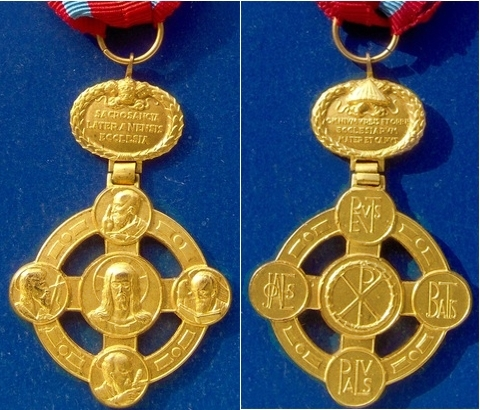
Papal Lateran Cross (2nd design) in Gold

== Recipients ==
Notable individuals who received this honor include:

- Aaron Bradshaw Jr. (United States)
- Charles de Gaulle (France)
- Max Corvo (United States)
- Vincent James Scamporino, United States, OSS.
- William Joseph Donovan (United States)
- Władysław Drapiewski (Poland)
- Ricardo Lancaster-Jones y Verea (Mexico)
- Wolfgang Mayer-König (Austria)
- Constancio C. Vigil (Argentina)
- Antonio Conticelli (USA)

== See also ==
- List of ecclesiastical decorations
