= Order of Queen Tamara =

Order of Queen Tamara may refer to:

- Order of Queen Tamara (1918), awarded by the Democratic Republic of Georgia during World War I
- Order of Queen Tamara (2009), awarded by the current Republic of Georgia
