= Ecclesiastical award =

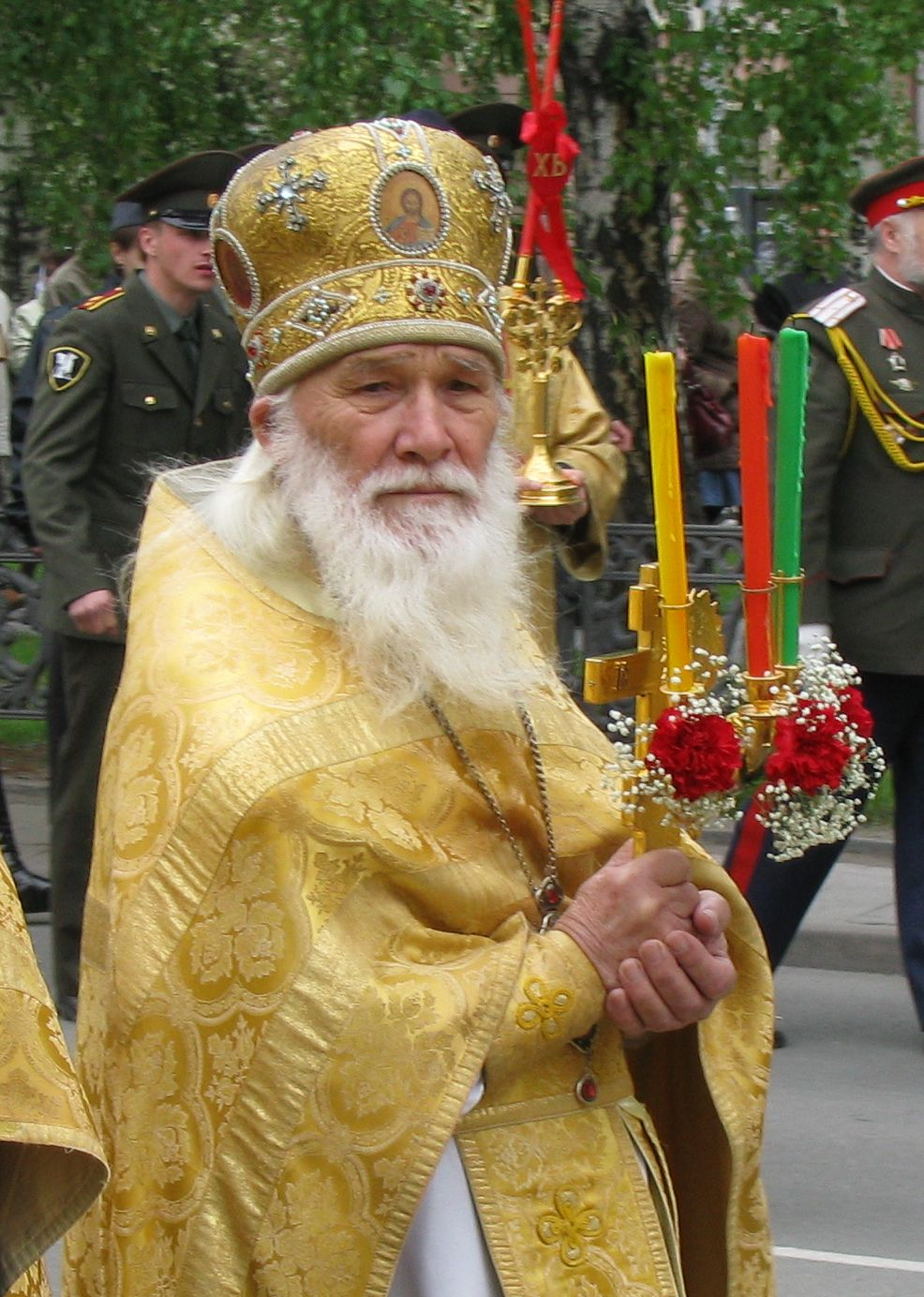
A Russian Orthodox priest who has been awarded the dignity of wearing a mitre.

An Ecclesiastical award is an official award, honor or privilege presented by ecclesiastical authority.

== Eastern Orthodox Church ==
In the Eastern Orthodox Church certain official awards and honours may be bestowed upon members of the clergy and laity. Such awards are bestowed either by the ruling bishop under whose jurisdiction the recipient resides, or—in the case of higher awards— by a synod of bishops.

When a bishop wishes to confer an ecclesiastical award or honor on a deacon or priest under his jurisdiction, this will normally be accomplished at the Little Entrance of the Divine Liturgy. At the end of the Third Antiphon (normally the Beatitudes), the procession with the Gospel Book will halt at the bishop's cathedra (episcopal throne). The clergyman who is to receive the award will be presented to the bishop, the protodeacon will remove the bishop's mitre, the bishop will lay his hand upon the head of the clergyman and say the prayer proper to that particular award. He will then confer the award and the people will exclaim, "Axios! Axios! Axios!" as an expression of their acknowledgment of the clergyman's worthiness for the award, similar to applause at a secular awards ceremony.

Awards differ according to the rank of the individual honored, and will vary among the ecclesiastical jurisdictions. Awards granted to bishops and the higher awards to priests are often reserved to begin conferred by a synod of bishops.

Bishops

- Second panagia (every bishop wears one)
- Mitre with cross (in the Old Russian tradition, only an archbishop or above would have a cross on top of his mitre, unless he was awarded the privilege by the synod)

Priests

- mitre
- Pectoral cross:
  - Jewelled cross
  - Gold cross
  - Silver cross
- Epigonation
- Nabedrennik
- Purple kamilavka
- Purple skufia

Deacons

- Doubled orarion
- Purple or Red kamiavka.

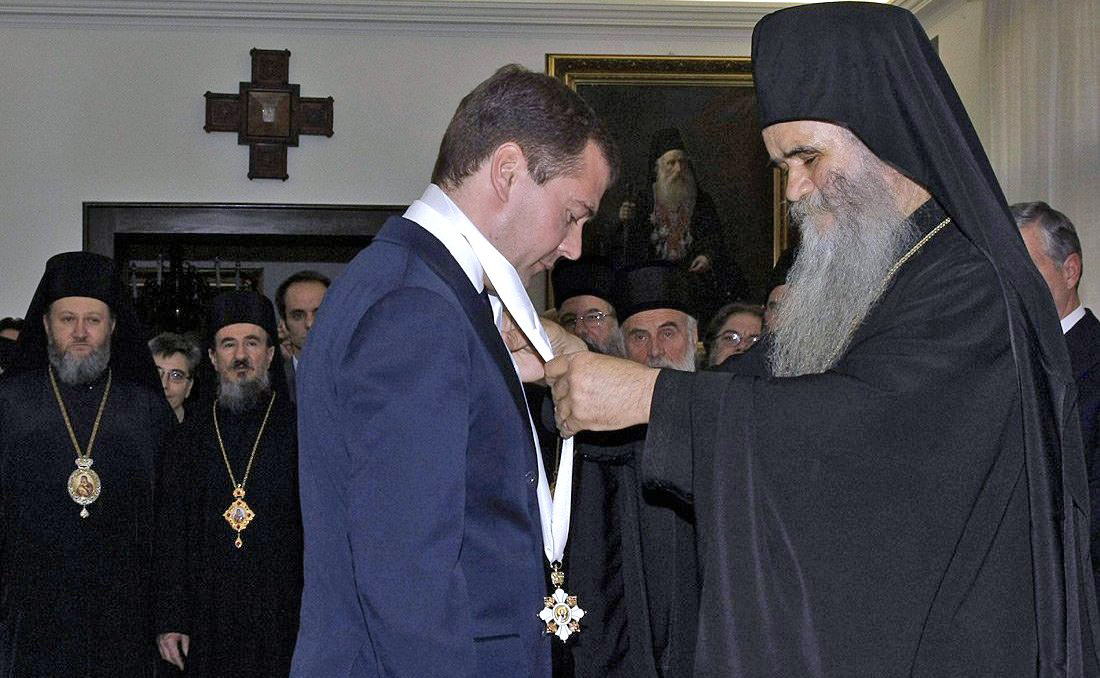
Dmitry Medvedev receives the Order of St. Sava from the Serbian Orthodox Church.

Laity

- Chivalric order or medal
- Gramota (official letter of recognition)

Some of these awards have their origin in the Byzantine court, others developed later. During the reign of Catherine the Great these awards came to be tied to the stipend which was paid to clergymen.

== Anglican Communion ==
In the Anglican Communion, the Church of England awards annually several cash bursaries to ordained ministers, for research. The Sussex Heritage Trust awards annually one grant for restoration or repairs to an ecclesiastical building.

== See also ==
- Ecclesiastical decoration
- List of ecclesiastical decorations
- Ordinance (canon law)
