= List of villages in Kanyakumari district =

This is an alphabetical list of villages in Kanyakumari district, Tamil Nadu, India.

== A-E ==
- Alanchi
- Ambankalai
- Aruvikkarai
- Atchenkulam
- Asaripallam
- Azhagappapuram
- Chemmanvilai
- Chemmuthal
- Chinnamuttom
- Chinnathurai
- Choozhal
- Enayam Puthenthurai

== K ==
- Kandanvilai
- Kappukad
- Karavilai
- Karuparai
- Kattathurai
- Keezha Sarakkalvilai
- Kesavanputhenthurai
- Kesavapuram
- Kinnikannanvilai
- Kodimunai
- Kollenvilagam
- Kombavilai
- Kottagom
- Kulasekaram
- Kumarakovil
- Kurumpanai
- Kusavankuzhi

== M ==
- Madathattuvilai
- Madichel
- Mangavilai
- Maravankudieruppu
- Marthal
- Marthandanthurai
- Mela Raman Puthoor
- Melpuram
- Midalam
- Moolachel
- Moovattumugam
- Muhilankudieruppu
- Muppandal
- Muttom

== N-O ==
- Neerody
- Nesamony Nagar
- Nettancode
- Neyyoor
- Nithiravilai
- North Sarel
- Ottalivilai

== P-R ==
- Padanthalumoodu
- Palliyadi
- Parakuntu
- Payanam
- Pazhavilai
- Peruvilai
- Pallavilai
- Pillayarvilai
- Pillayarvilai-North
- Puthenchanthai
- Rajavoor
- Ramanathichanputhur
- Ramapuram

== S-T ==
- South Thamaraikulam
- Swamiyar madam
- Tamaraikulam
- Thirunanthikarai
- Thoothoor
- Thovalai

== V-W ==
- Vadakkanadu
- Vallan Kumaran Vilai
- Vallavilai
- Vattavilai
- Vavathurai
- Vellicode
- Veturnimadam
- Virivilai
- West Neyyoor
- West Parasery
