= Kaviyaloor =

Kaviyaloor is a developing town panchayat in the Kanyakumari district in the Indian state of Tamil Nadu approximately 47 kilometres from Thiruvananthapuram.

Nearly 250 families are residing, it is one of the smallest towns in the region. There are villages in the west side (Palliyadi), south side (Maruthoor Kurichi), north side (Pulipunnam) and east side (Kattathurai).

Kaviyaloor is located in the center of Pulipunnam and Valvachagostam connecting road. Popular locations include sahaya mary Church and kokkadi kuzhalam, valvachagostam temple.

== Education ==
People have realized the need for education more than anything else. Almost every house has at least one person who is a graduate or a post-graduate. The younger generation has begun looking for both jobs as well as business opportunities in the metropolitan cities in India as well as overseas that has brought about a significant change in the living standards of people. People prefer to send their kids to nearby town schools such as st.michaels matriculation school kattathurai, palliyadi L.M.S, Govt school swamiyarmadam, etc.

== Transportation ==
The people of Kaviyaloor primarily depend on the public transport buses that connect to the nearby towns like Nagercoil, Marthandam, and Karungal. Apart from that a considerable number of auto rickshaws and privately owned cars are available for hire. The nearest airport is Thiruvananthapuram International Airport which falls in the state of Kerala.

== Climate ==
Summers are pretty humid and temperature reaches at 34 °C easily at that time. Summer months start from March and end in May. Monsoon months are from June till September with an average temperature of about 25 °C during the same time. Winters start from November and ends in February with an average temperature of 22 °C. Although, kavialoor is located at a distance of approximately 50 km from Kanyakumari, temperature difference in the day stands at around 3 -4 degrees always.

== Religious Orientation ==
Christian churches and Hindu temples.
