= Vallikkode =

Vallikkode may refer to:

- Vallicode, Pathanamthitta, India.
- Vellicode, Kanyakumari, India.
- Vallicode-Kottayam, Pathanamthitta, India
