= Nettancode =

Nettancode is a small village in Kurunthancode union under Kalkulam taluk in Kanyakumari district, Tamil Nadu, India. It is surrounded by Mottavillai, Mallencode, Karancadu.

http://www.kanyakumari.tn.nic.in/ http://wikimapia.org/#lat=8.2038181&lon=77.3400056&z=18&l=0&m=b&search=nettancode
