= Vattavilai =

- village
- Location in Tamil Nadu, India Vattavilai (India)
- Coordinates: 8°14′18″N 77°16′20″E
- Country: India
- State: Tamil Nadu
- District: Kanyakumari

Languages
  - Official: Tamil
- Time zone: UTC+5:30 (IST)
- Postal Code: 629168
- Telephone code: 04651
- Vehicle registration: TN-75
- Nearest city: Nagercoil

Vattavilai is a fertile village, situated in the southern part of Vilavancode taluk of the Kanyakumari District of Tamil Nadu State.

Some of the neighbouring villages of Vattavilai are Kottavilai, Ooralivilai, Maruthancode, etc. Vattavilai is part of Pacode Panchayat Union. Vattavilai is comprised the half of pacode village Panchayat. Vattavilai spreads over an area of 16 square kilometer. It is known from ancestor that the name Vattavilai derived because of its circle (round) shape layout.

== Population ==
According to 2001 census the population of this area is 4092.

== Temples ==
There is a Lord Krishna temple at Thottathumadam in the banks of Aanatam kulam (pond). There also a devi (Bathrakali) temple at the heart of the village. People in this village are more devoted to their religions.

== Places nearby Vattavilai ==
- Melpuram
- Maruthancode
- Kuzhithurai
- Marthandam
- Arumanai
- Kulasekaram
