= Pillayarvilai =

Pillayarvilai is a small village in Rajakkamangalam Taluk in Kanyakumari district in Tamil Nadu State, India.

Rajakkamangalam, Kurunthancode, Agastiswaram and Thackalai, are the nearby towns to Pillayarvilai. Pillayarvilai is reachable by Nagercoil railway station

== Temples ==
=== Sudalaimadan temple & Ayya temple ===
This Temples is more cute and peaceful for all devotees. It has devotees from surrounding villages also.

== Education ==
The Government Middle School is located in the area Neendakarai-B of Rajakkamangalam. Government Middle School Pillaiyarvilai was established in the year 1946.

Govt Middle School Pillayarvilai is in the Kanyakumari district of Tamil Nadu state. Pin code is 629502. The management of Government Middle School Pillayarvilai is Dept. of Education.
