= Vallavilai =

Village in Tamil Nadu, India

Coordinates: 8°16′53.24″N 77°6′51.47″E

Vallavilai is a fishing village in Kanyakumari district, Tamil Nadu, India.

As of 2011, India census Vallavilai had a population of 10,282. Males constitute 51% of the population and 49% for females. Vallavilai has an average literacy rate of 86%, higher than the national average of 59.5%. Male literacy is 80% and female 80%. In Vallavilai 11% of the population is under 6 years of age.

== Places of Worship ==
- St. Mary's Church
- St. Antony's Crusade
- St. Jude's Crusade
- St. Pio's Shrine
- Our Lady of Health Crusade
- Juma Masjid
- Sri Rajarajeshwari Ishakkiamman Temple
- St. Antony's Shrine Edappadu

== Institutions ==
- St. Jude's High School

== Sports Clubs ==
- St. Antony's Sports Club, Vallavilai
- J4 Indoor Badminton Club
- Subzero Football Turf
- St . Judes sports Club, Vallavilai
