= Kollenvilagam =

Kollenvilagam is a village located near Marthandam, Kanyakumari district, India. The village is home to more than 100 families.
