= Nithiravilai =

Neighbourhood in Kanyakumari district, Tamil Nadu, India

- Village
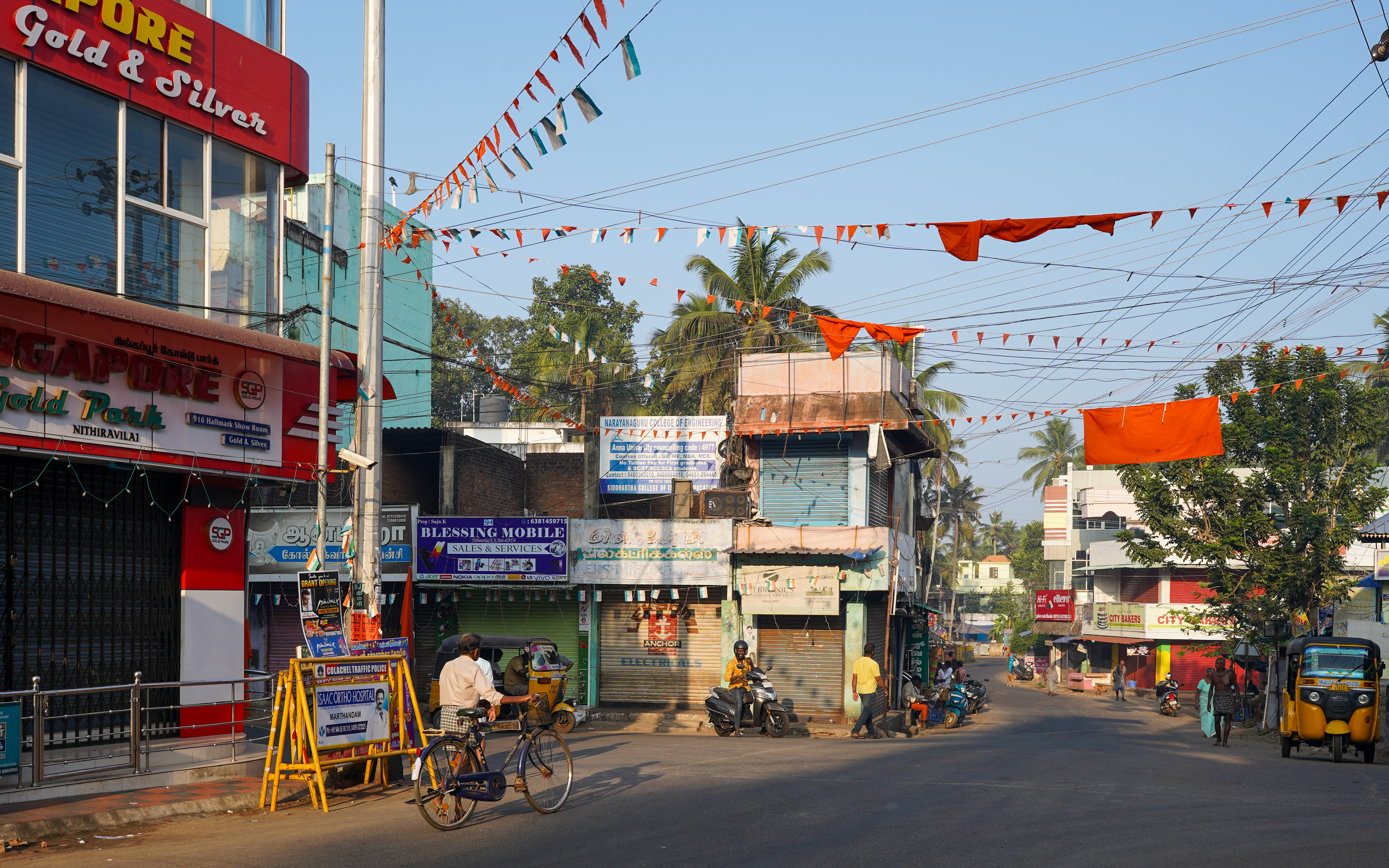
- Nithiravilai junction, Kanyakumari Road

- Location within Tamil Nadu
- Coordinates: 8.2739143°N 77.1435838°E
- Country: India
- State: Tamil Nadu
- Time zone: UTC+5:30 (IST)
- Postal Index Number: 629154
- Website: kanniyakumari.nic.in

Nithiravilai is a village in Kollemcode Municipalilty in Kanyakumari district, Tamil Nadu, India. It is a business town bordering the state of Kerala. The Kerala border is approximately 3 km (1.9 mi) from the village. Nithiravilai is about 14 km (8.7 mi) from Marthandam and 9 km (5.6 mi) north of Kaliyakkavilai.

== Amenities ==
Nithiravilai has an India Post branch post office (B.O.) with pincode 629154 and a police station. LPG cylinders are available for cooking purposes from an Indane gas agency.

== Gallery ==
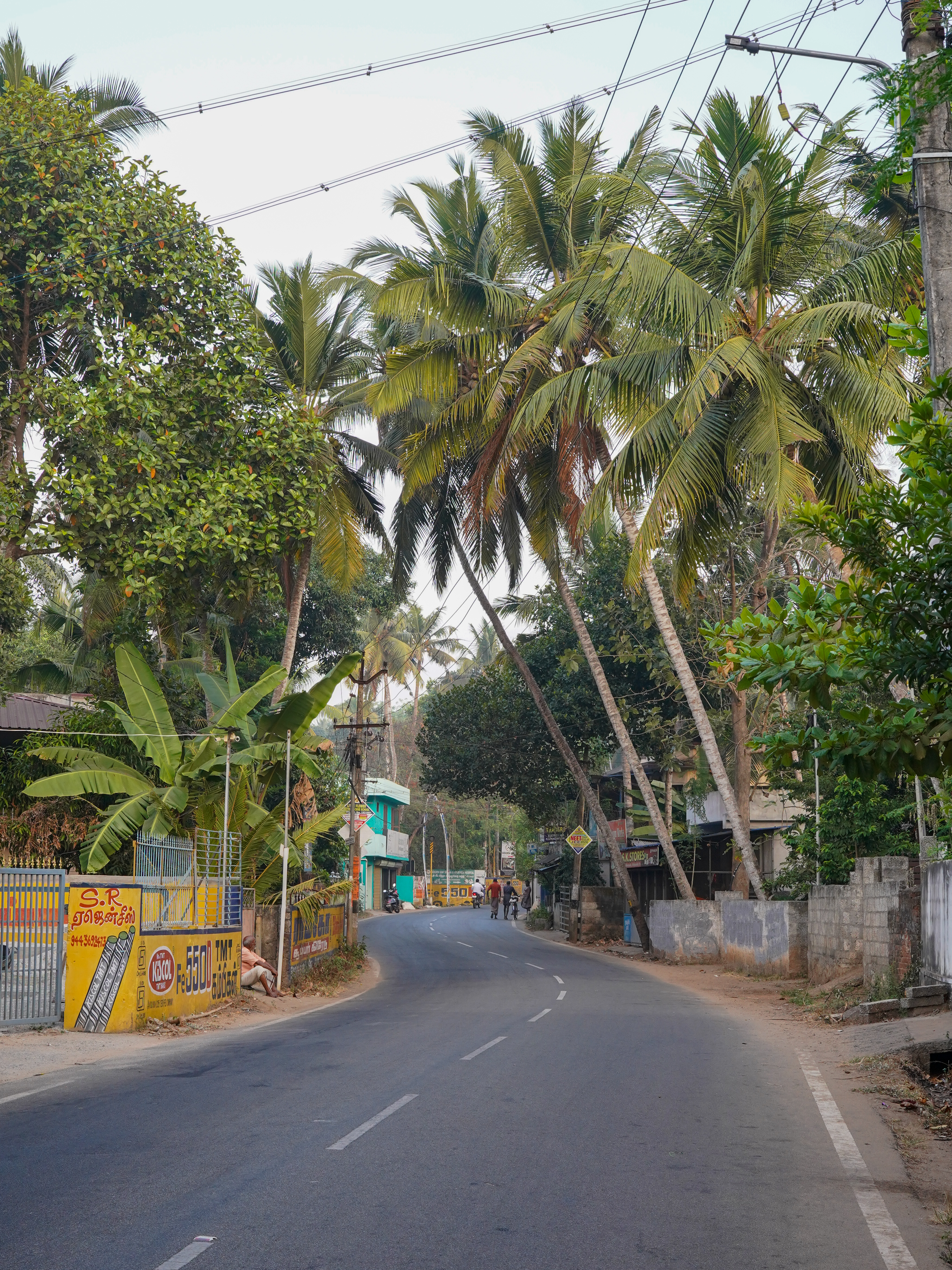
Kanyakumari road

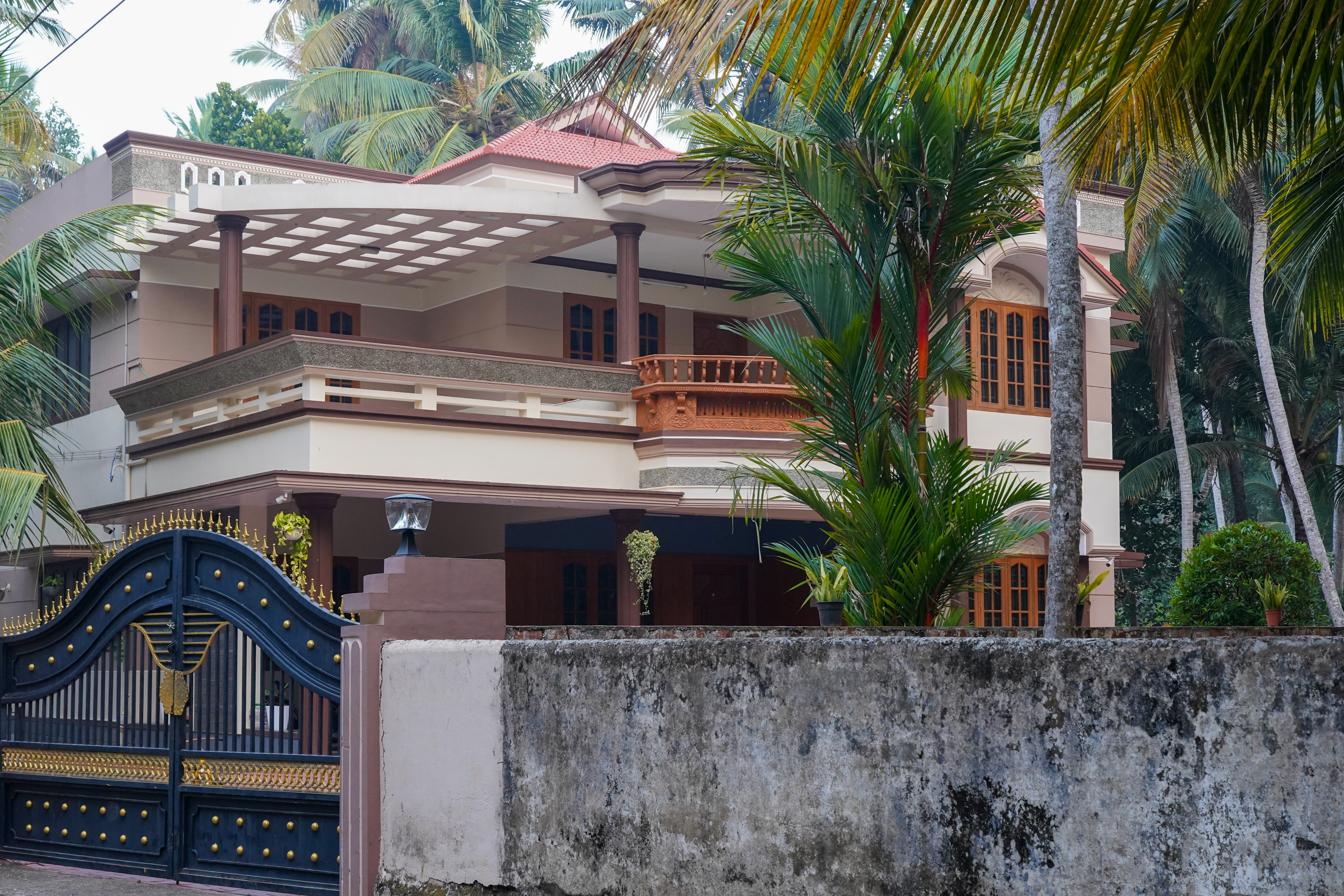
Typical residential building

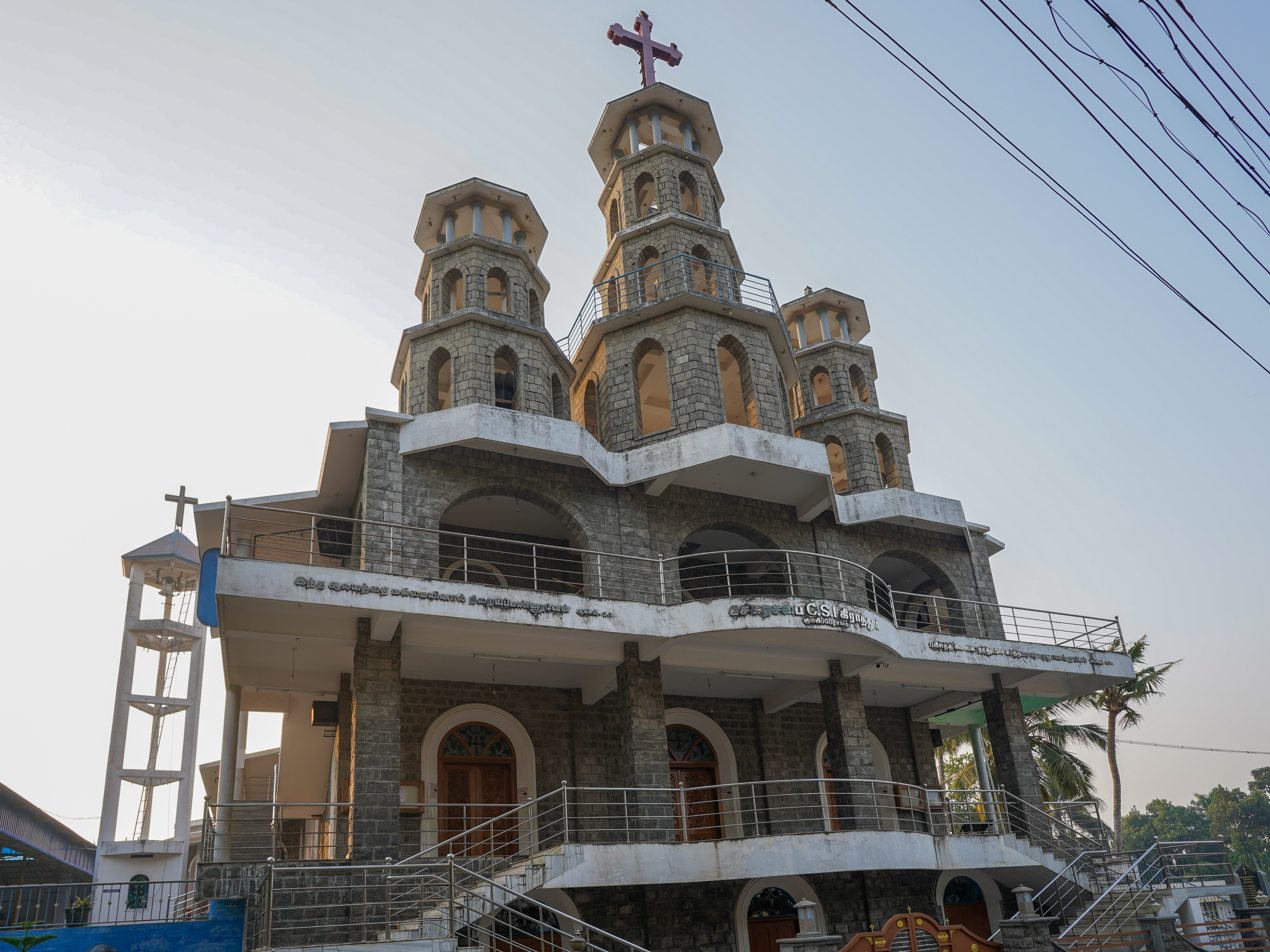
CSI Church, Kirathoor

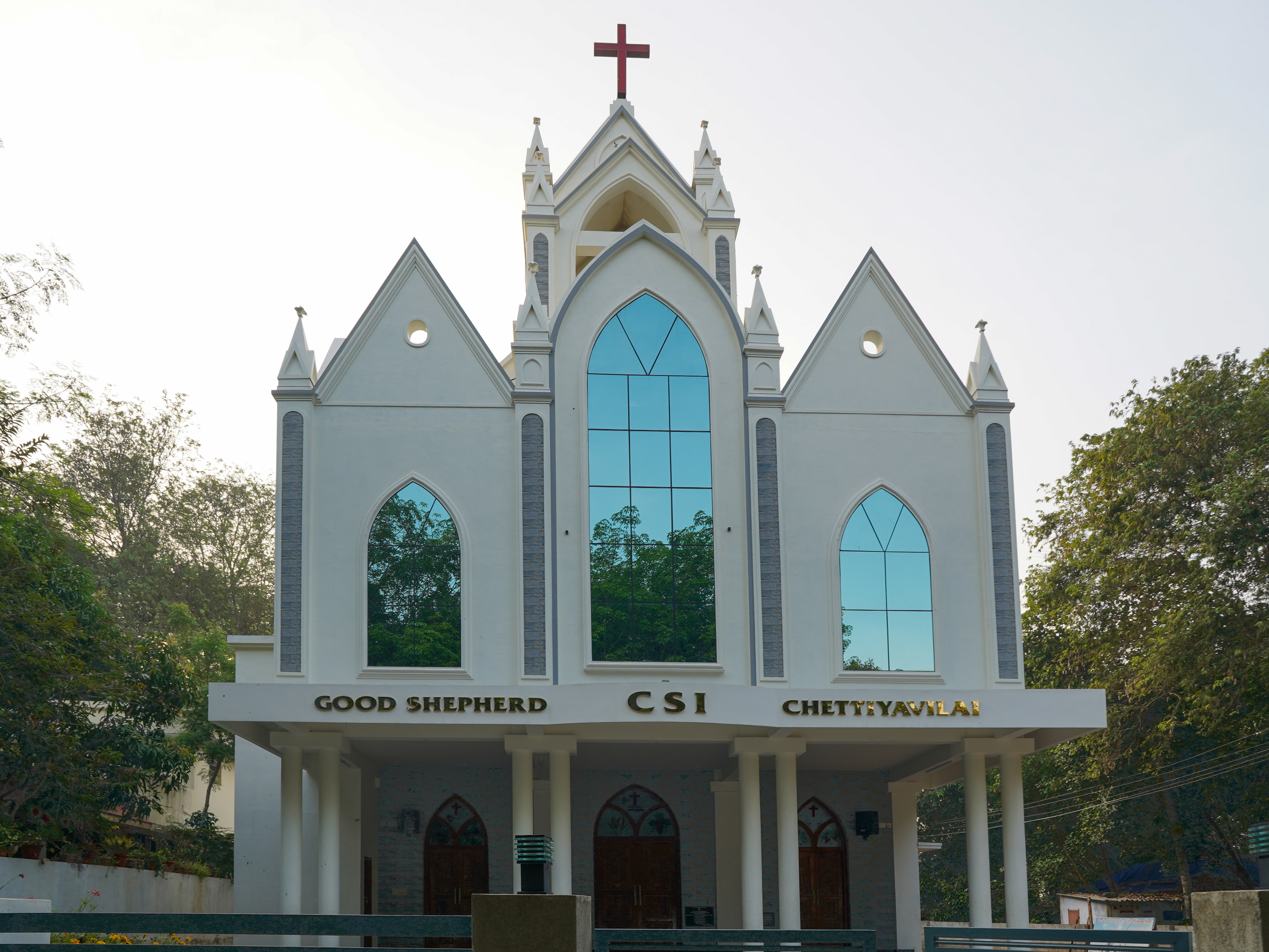
Good Shepherd CSI Church

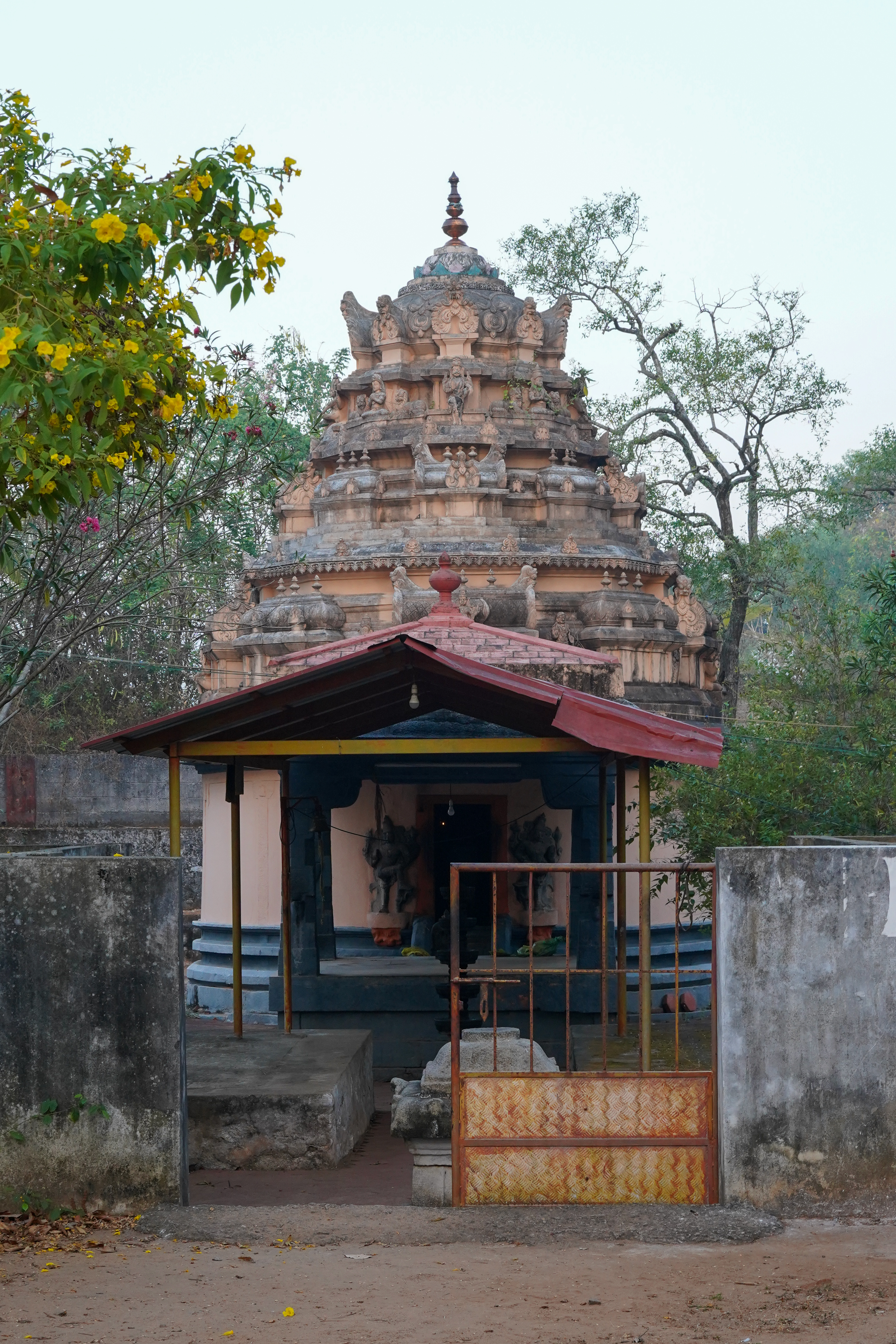
Old Hindu temple

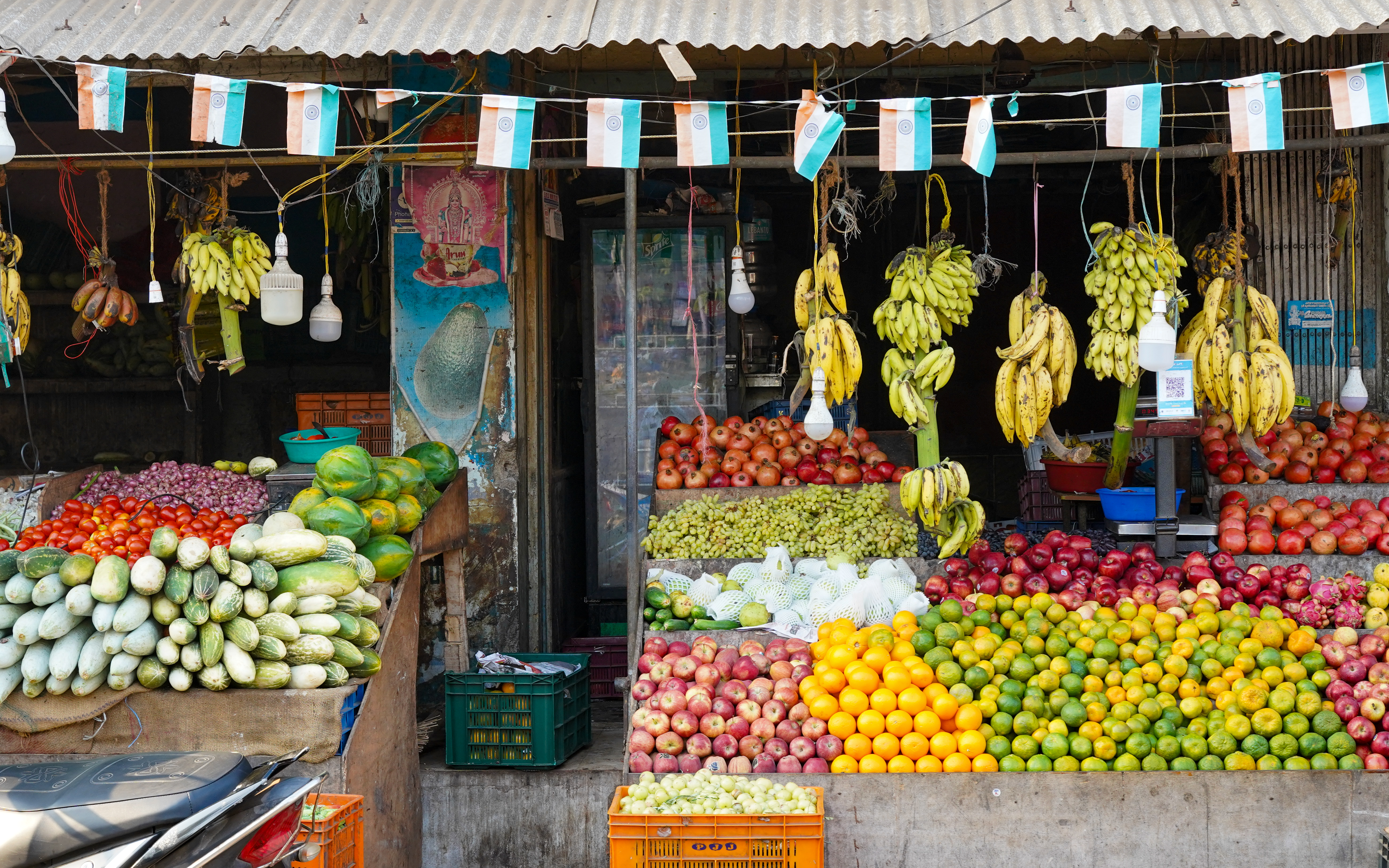
Fruits & vegetables shop

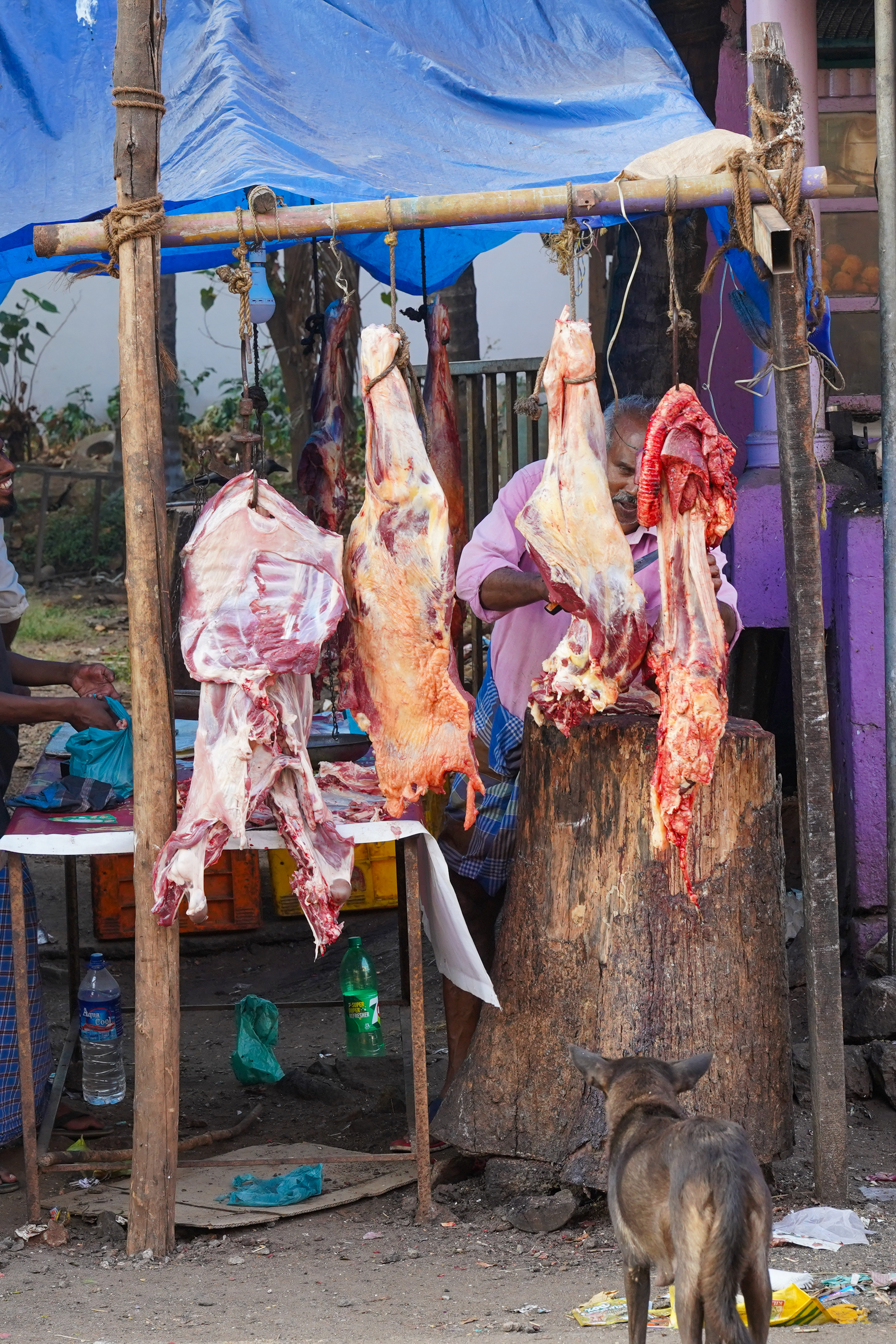
Mutton shop

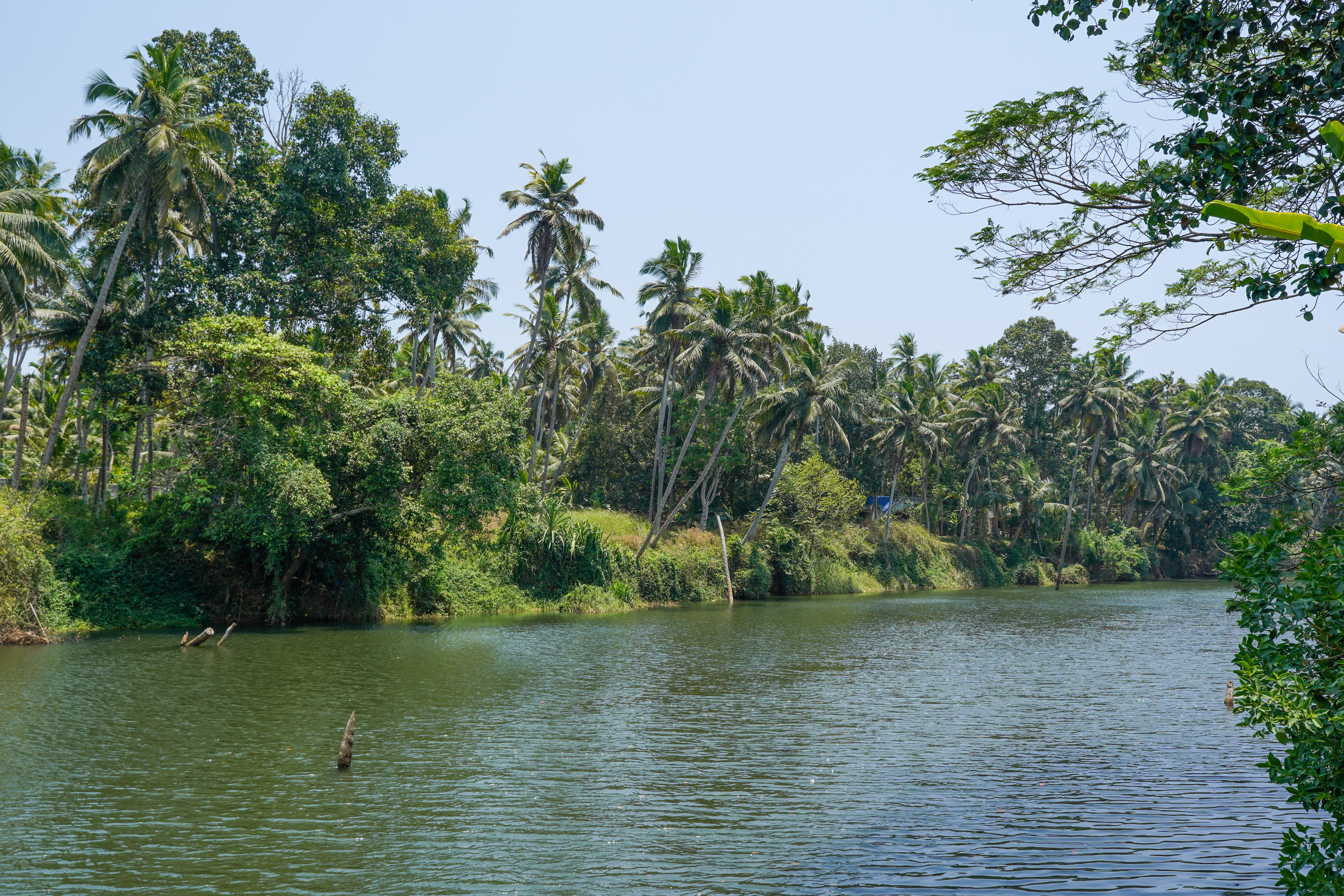
Tambaraparani river near Nithiravilai
