= Ambankalai =

- village
- Country: India
- State: Tamil Nadu
- District: Kanyakumari

Languages
  - Official: Tamil
- Time zone: UTC+5:30 (IST)
- Nearest city: Kulasekharam

Ambankalai is a hamlet located near Thiruvarambu, within the Thiruvattar town panchayat in the Kanniyakumari district of India. The village produces various crops including banana, coconut, and pepper. A canal-like stream supplying water originates from nearby dams such as Pechiparai, Perunchani, and Kodaiyyar, ensuring the village has a steady water supply. Thirparappu waterfalls is situated 3km away from Ambankalai.

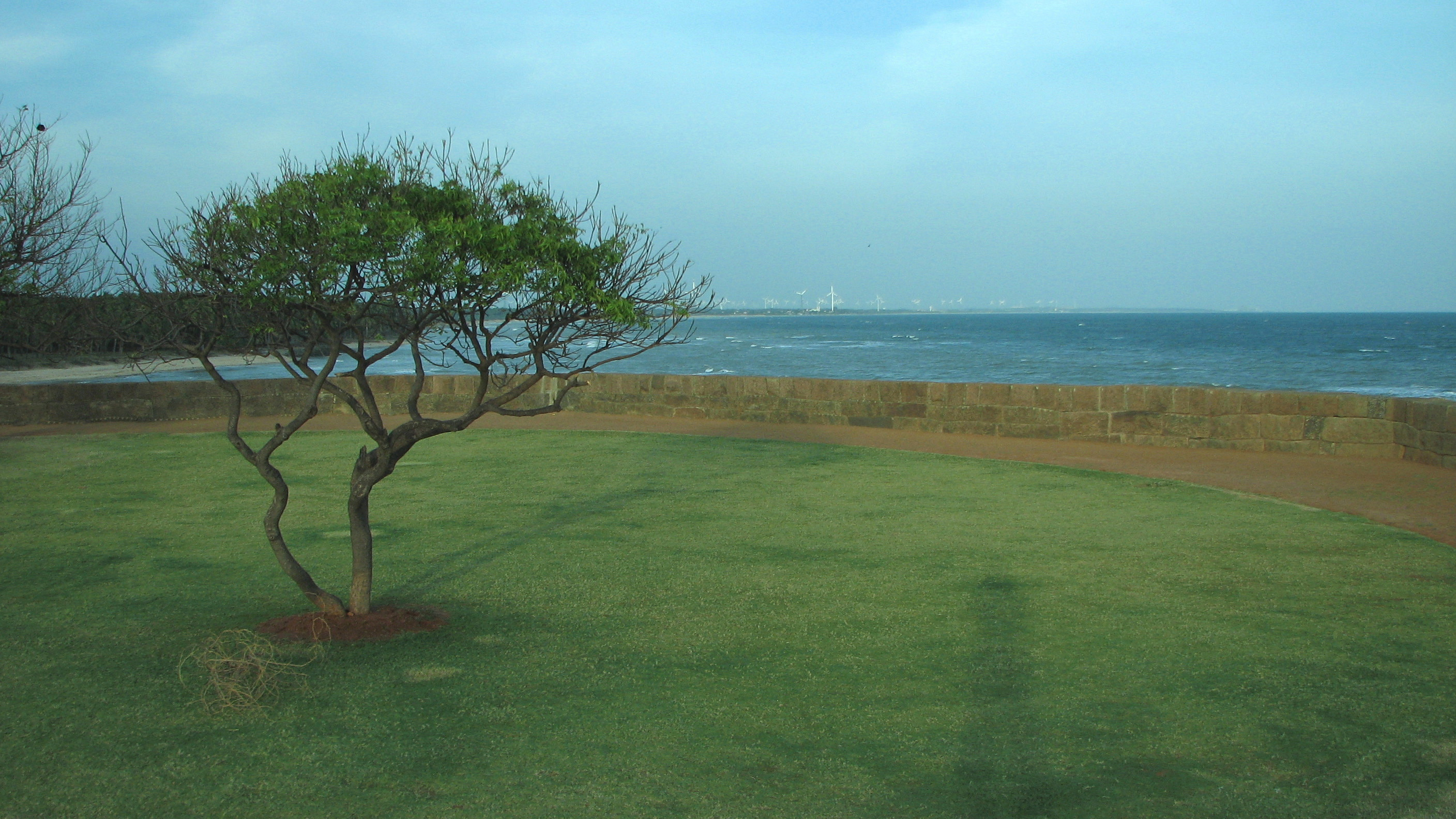
View of the sea from Vattakottai Fort, near Kanyakumari town.

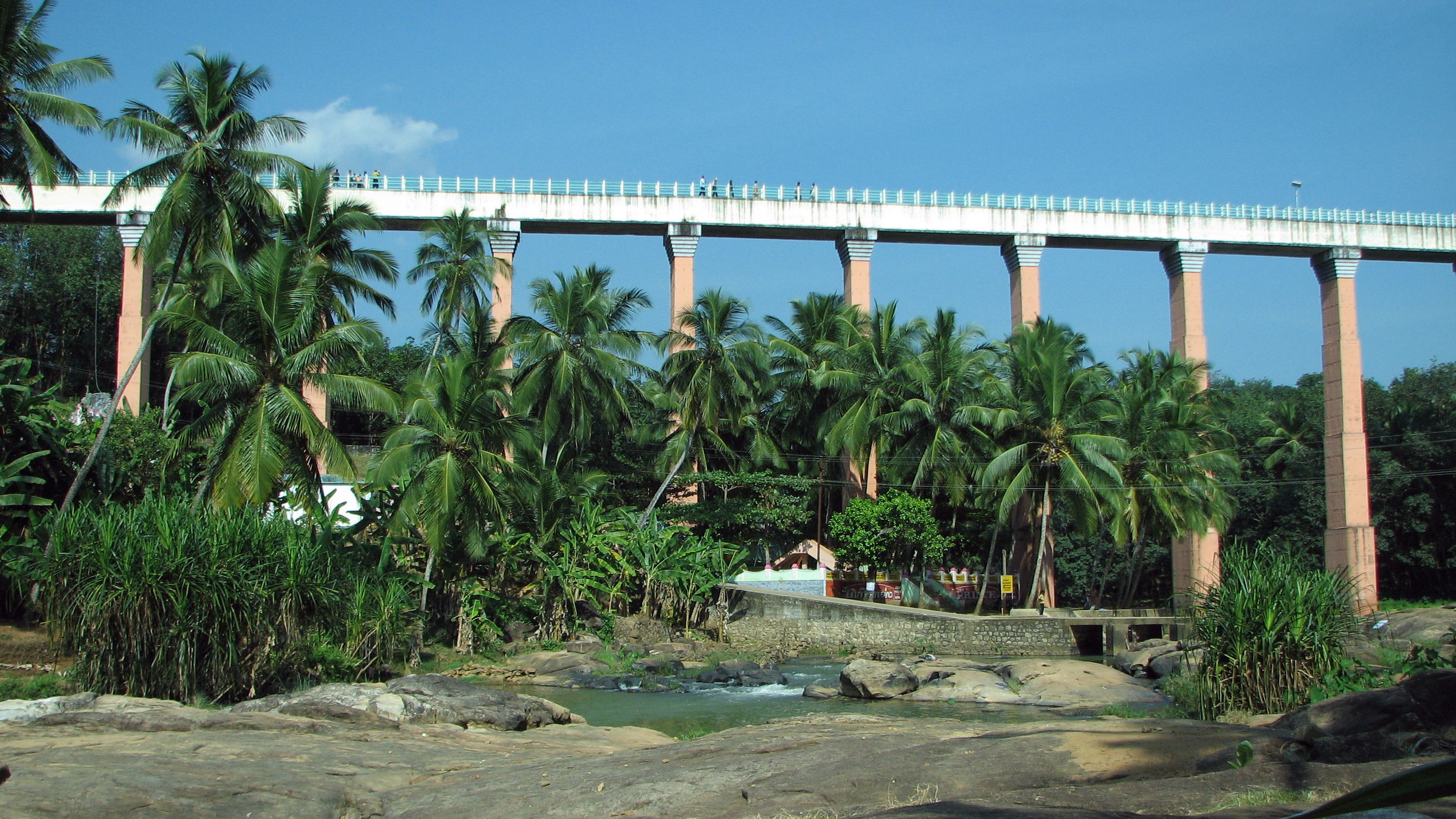
Mathur Aqueduct, near Thiruvattar, is the longest aqueduct in South Asia

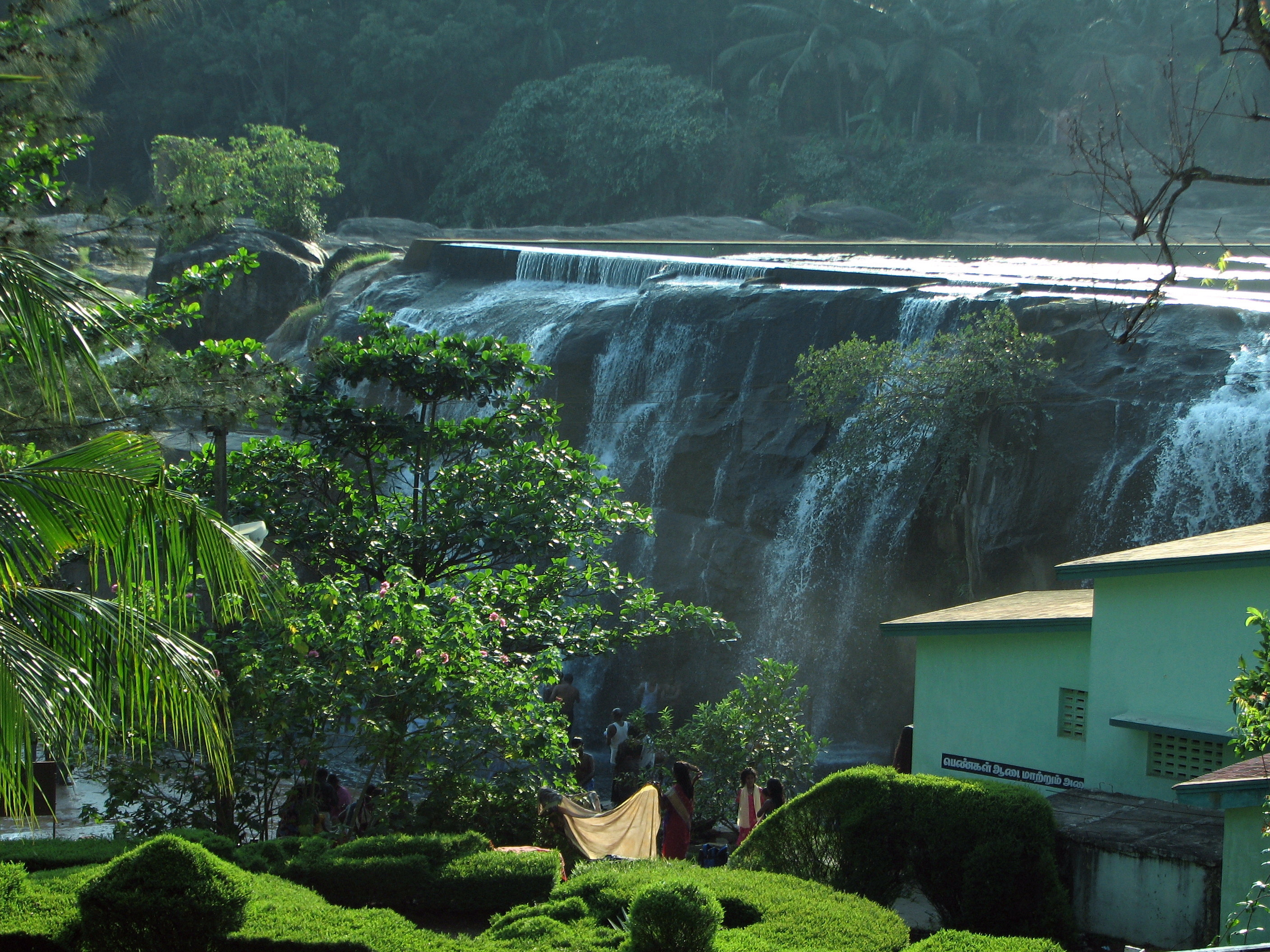
Thirparappu Waterfalls are one of the nice falls around Kanyakumari

.
