= Chinnathurai =

Chinnathurai Ezhudesam Chinnathurai
- Developed Village
- Nickname: The Real Shark Hunters
- Location in Tamil Nadu, India Chinnathurai (India)
- Coordinates: 8.260998°N 77.143094°E
- country: India
- State: Tamil Nadu
- District: Kanyakumari

Government
  - Type: Gram Panchayat
  - Body: Thoothoor Gram Panchayat

Languages
  - Official: Tamil
- Time zone: UTC+5:30 (IST)
- Thoothoor PIN: 629176
- Nearest city: Thiruvananthapuram, Nagercoil
- Climate: Tropical, Coastal (Köppen)
- Website: www.chinnathurai.info

Chinnathurai is a village in Kanyakumari district of Tamil Nadu, at the southern tip of India under the parent village of Ezhudesam.

== Geography and climate ==
Chinnathurai is on the western coast of Tamil Nadu under the parent village of Ezhudesam.

The mean maximum temperature is 34 °C and the mean minimum temperature is 21 °C.
