= Karuparai =

Karuparai (காருபாறை) is a village that comes under Vellimalai Town Panchayat, Kanyakumari District, Tamil Nadu, India. Karuparai Village comes under "Manavalakurichi Police Station". The village is surrounded by Ponds, Paddy fields, Banana trees, coconut trees, etc., Nagercoil, Kanyakumari district. Nearby Post office "Kalpadi, Sub-Post office"

The town is governed by the Kalkulam Talukand town panchayat of Vellimalai. More than 5,000 families residing in the village.

Temples in the village include the Ulakalanthal Amman Koil Temple of god Sivan & Parvathi, situated in the center of the village. There is a Pooja performed both morning and evening. The temple hosts a major festival in the second week of March each year.

The village has another temple "Sudalaimadan Temple" which is situated at the western end of the village, this temple hosts a major festival in the first week of April every year. In this temple the famous "Kaniattam"(கனியாட்டம்) is conducted every year at festival times.

The village has relationship, child center, and group for playing Kabaddi and other games.

There is also a Vellimalai Murugan temple.

== Transport ==
Trivandrum International Airport is 65.4 km away.

The nearest railway is Eraniel Railway Station (ERL), 6.1 km away.

The nearest bus station is Thingal Nagar, 4.1 km away, and private minibus services like Selvi, Mathavas, etc.,

The buses available from the Nagercoil town bus stand are 12G, 12F, 12M, 12R, and 12K.

Bus route No. 47 from Thuckalai to Muttom, via Karuparai.

Bus route No. 46C from Marthandam to Kadiapattinam, via Karuparai.
