= Madichel =

Village in Tamil Nadu, India

Madichel is a village in Vilavancode taluk, Kanniyakumari district, Tamil Nadu, India.

It has an area of 3 km².
