= Puthenchanthai =

Neighbourhood in Kanyakumari district, Tamil Nadu, India

- Village
- Location in Tamil Nadu, India
- Coordinates: 8°23′12″N 77°12′02″E
- Country: India
- State: Tamil Nadu
- District: Kanyakumari

Languages
  - Official: Tamil;Malayalam
- Time zone: UTC+5:30 (IST)
- PIN: 629152
- Telephone code: 04651&+91xxxxxxxxxx
- Vehicle registration: TN-75
- Nearby cities: Nagercoil & Trivandrum
- Literacy: 100%

Puthenchanthai is in Villavancode taluk, Kanyakumari District in the Indian state of Tamil Nadu. It is a small village shared by Maruthancode & Edaikodu Panchayats.

== Economy ==
The economy rests on farmers, rubber tappers and a few organized sector workers.

== Geography ==
Vilavancode (2 km), Melpuram (2 km), Muzhucode (3 km), Vellamcode (5 km), Mancode (6 km) are nearby villages. Puthenchanthai is surrounded by Parassala Taluk to the west, Thiruvattar Taluk to the east, Munchira Taluk to the south, and Neyyattinkara Taluk to the north.

Pacode, Thiruparappu, Unnamalaikadai, and Kollankodu are nearby cities.

== Education ==
A government primary school is in Edaicode. A primary school is in Parakkunnu, a government middle school at Melpuram, Higher secondary schools are in Kalluppaam, southwest Edaicode. Chemmankalai. Maruthancode, Anducaode, English medium schools are also present.

== Transport ==
The nearest railway station is Kuzhithurai west. Puthenchantha is at an equally accessible distance either from Trivandurm, Kerala or from Nagercoil, but all access to the village requires crossing at least one river.
