= West Neyyoor =

Village in Tamil Nadu, India

West Neyyoor is a village in Kanniyakumari district, Tamil Nadu, India.
