= Virivilai =

Virivilai is a village situated in Kanyakumari District of Tamil Nadu, India. One of the fertile lands with plantations, the perennial water flow through the river tributary Thamiravaruni which flows into Arabian Sea after running for 6 kilometers from here.
