= Ottalivilai =

- village
- Location in Tamil Nadu, India Ottalivilai (India)
- Coordinates: 8.3164°N 77.2987°E
- Country: India
- State: Tamil Nadu

Population
  - Total: 500

Languages
  - Official: Tamil
- Time zone: UTC+5:30 (IST)

Ottalivilai is a village located in the Kanyakumari District of Tamil Nadu, India. This village ancestors are great landlords. Main job of this villagers is Farming. Many of youngsters are working in abroad. Girls are primarily choosing nursing studies. Neighbouring villages are Chenkody, Muthalaaru. Pattanam Canal which came from Mathoor, is passing through this village.

== Village Name Description ==
Village name is derived from "Ottal", which means "Pond". 'This village is situated around the pond. "Vilai" means agriculture land. Thus, it had this name.

== Community & Population ==
Christian Sambavars are the sons of this village. Here, 110 families are living there. Total population of this village is, 500.

== Religious Places ==
The Salvation Army Church is situated at the middle of this village.

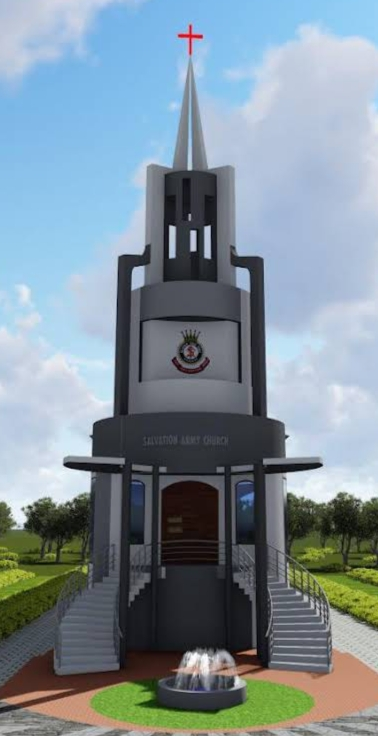
Ottalivilai Salvation army Church
