= Kinnikannanvilai =

- village
- Location in Tamil Nadu, India Kinnikannanvilai (India)
- Coordinates: 8.100°N 77.541°E
- Country: India
- State: Tamil Nadu
- District: Kanyakumari

Government
  - Village head: P. A. I. Senthil

Area
  - Total: 25.89 km^{2} (10.00 sq mi)
- Elevation: 0–300 m (0–984 ft)

Population (2007)
  - Total: 678
  - Density: 165/km^{2} (430/sq mi)

Languages
  - Official: Tamil
- Time zone: UTC+5:30 (IST)
- PIN: 629 701
- Telephone code: 914652
- Vehicle registration: TN 74

Kinnikannanvilai is a village on the west coast of Kanyakumari, Tamil Nadu, India, flanked by Muhilankudieruppu in the south and Kovilvilai in the north. Kinnikannanvilai is bound by Puviyoor in the east and Arabian Sea in the west. The village is connected with Kanyakumari Bus Terminus (4 km) and Nagercoil town (16 km) by road. The nearest city is Thiruvananthapuram (Capital of Kerala). The holy capitals, Swamithope and Suchindrum are 4 km (2.5 mi) and 7 km (4.3 mi) away from Kinnikannanvilai respectively.
