= Pazhavilai =

- Village
- Nickname: fruit village
- Country: India
- State: Tamil Nadu
- District: Kanyakumari

Government
  - Body: Rajakkamangalam Gram Panchayat, Asaripallam Panchayat

Area
  - Total: 2 km^{2} (0.77 sq mi)
- Elevation: 6 m (20 ft)

Population
  - Total: 500 and more
  - Density: 250/km^{2} (650/sq mi)

Languages
  - Official: Tamil
- Time zone: UTC+5:30 (IST)
- PIN: 629501
- Telephone code: 04652
- Vehicle registration: TN-74
- Nearest city: Nagercoil
- Lok Sabha constituency: Nagercoil
- Civic agency: Rajakkamangalam Gram Panchayat, Asaripallam Panchayat
- Climate: Humid (Köppen)
- Avg. summer temperature: 35 °C (95 °F)
- Avg. winter temperature: 29 °C (84 °F)

Pazhavilai is a small village located 8 km from Nagercoil, Tamil Nadu, India. It is home to Kamarajar Polytechnic College and the Rajakkamangalam Punchyat Union Block Development Office for Neendakarai B Agastheeswaram Taluk.

== Transportation an communications ==
It is located near the Nagercoil-Colachel Road. Bus routes 38E, 38G, 38K, 40, and 54 run through Pazhavilai. Pazhavilai Post Office (629501) is the postal office responsible for distribution of post to the surrounding villages in the area.

== Environment ==
The village is set in a green environment with coconut plants, cashew nut trees and banana plantations.

== Spirituality ==
Mutharamman temple, Pattrakali Amman koil, Guruswamy koil, and Sastha temple are the famous temples located near the Block Development Office. The Mutharamman temple annual celebrations, known as Kovil Kodai Vizha, take place in May. Family members working in remote cities come back to the village to take part in the celebration.

== Education ==
Pazhavilai Middle school is located adjacent to Block Office. The School fulfills the primary education of the people of nearest villages. Even though most of the people prefer the schools in the Nagercoil town, still the Pazhavilai School satisfies some poor children around the village.

NMS Kamaraj Polytechnic College serves as the important technical education institution in the district. It is Tamil Nadu Government Aided Institution run by a society called "Nadar Mahajana Sangam". This College has provided good technical education, employment after completing the studies to many village students. The institution is sprawling across a large area, has a basketball ground, cricket ground, a Sastha temple, students hostel and surrounded by rich coconut trees and plantations

NMS Kamaraj College of Education is a B.Ed college, located inside the campus of the Kamaraj Polytechnic.

Sakker Nursery and Primary School is located near Kamaraj Polytechnic College.
