= Parakuntu =

Parakunnu is a village in Kanyakumari district, South Tamil Nadu, India. It is one of the modern villages in India.

== About ==
=== History ===
Before the independence of India, the area was a thick forest. Fr. James from Belgium played an important role in the history of the village.Fr.James has developed this village with various schemes Parakunnu Palm Mortgage Scheme is one of them.

=== School ===
- St.James RC High School, is the only school in the village.

=== Occupation ===
Major income for the village is rubber farming. The major occupation of the village is masonry.

=== Religion ===
Christianity and Hinduism are the major religions in the village.

=== Sports ===
- Kiliyanthattu (கிளியாந்தட்டு)
- Otra onnu (A traditional game played using the ball made of coconut leave).
- Seventy
- Kabadi
- Kachi (Goli)
- Vattu (Girls)
- Cricket

=== Hospital ===
- Ithayam Mision Hospital, Parakunnu

=== Ithayam Community Hall ===
- A community hall where most of the functions like Marriage Receptions,

Birthday parties and other functions takes place. Currently Barathanatiyam Arangetam took place. This Hall is the Sacred Heart church belongings.

=== Specials ===
- Sacred Heart Church is 1st dravida architecture catholic church.

The construction of this church is in the way that the pillars inside the church is in the model of the Hindu temple and a tomb at the top of the church which resembles muslim mosque. The pillars were similar to Dravidian style decorated by bundle of plantains. This church shows the connection with Dravidian architecture and art.

- New Life AG Church
- Saron Bethel Deva Sabai Parakuntu Church Estd 1979
- Vanniyoor Munnootti Mangalam Sri Dharma Sastha Temple

=== Shopping ===
- Parakunnu is one of the largest shopping center. Here many types of shops are available and a market is there which provides all types of fresh fishes and green vegetables.
