= Kappukad =

Village in Tamil Nadu, India

Kappukad/Kappukadu is an ancient village in southern Tamil Nadu in Kanyakumari District in Southern India. The village is also known as Kappiyankadu due to the belief that the ancient Tamil poet Tholkappiyar, the disciple of Agasthya, was born 1 May in the Tamil month of Chitirai on a pournami day in 865 BC.

The area of Kappukad covers around 1 square kilometre and St. Antony's Church is located at the centre of the village. The area is densely populated and over 5000 families live in the village.

The village is situated 2 km away from the Nagercoil - Thiruvananthapuram National Highway (NH47) and 3 km away from the continuation of East Coast Road connecting Kanyakumari and Kochi. The village is an important junction for traffic from both directions and for the proposed Express Highway from Thiruvananthapuram to Kanyakumari too.

The village is surrounded by paddy fields and coconut trees. One side of the village is heightened with rocks and small hills and the river Thamiraparani is located on the other. The nearest railway station is Kuzhithurai and the nearest town is Marthandam, located 1 and 2 km away respectively.

The people here speaks a mix of both Tamil and Malayalam languages. This language resembles the Srilankan Tamil. This place has belonged to Kerala around Independence but now is part of Tamil Nadu.

The nearest airport to Kappukad is Trivandrum International Airport, Thiruvananthapuram it's pin code is 629162

== Schools ==
- St. Antony's High School
- Artesia Matriculcation School
- Vigneshwara Matriculation School
- Govt. Middle School.

== Location ==
- Position : LAT : 8.3451335, LON : 77.18204
- Nearest Town : Marthandam
- Nearest Railway : Kuzhithurai, Kanyakumari
