= Chinnamuttom =

- Village
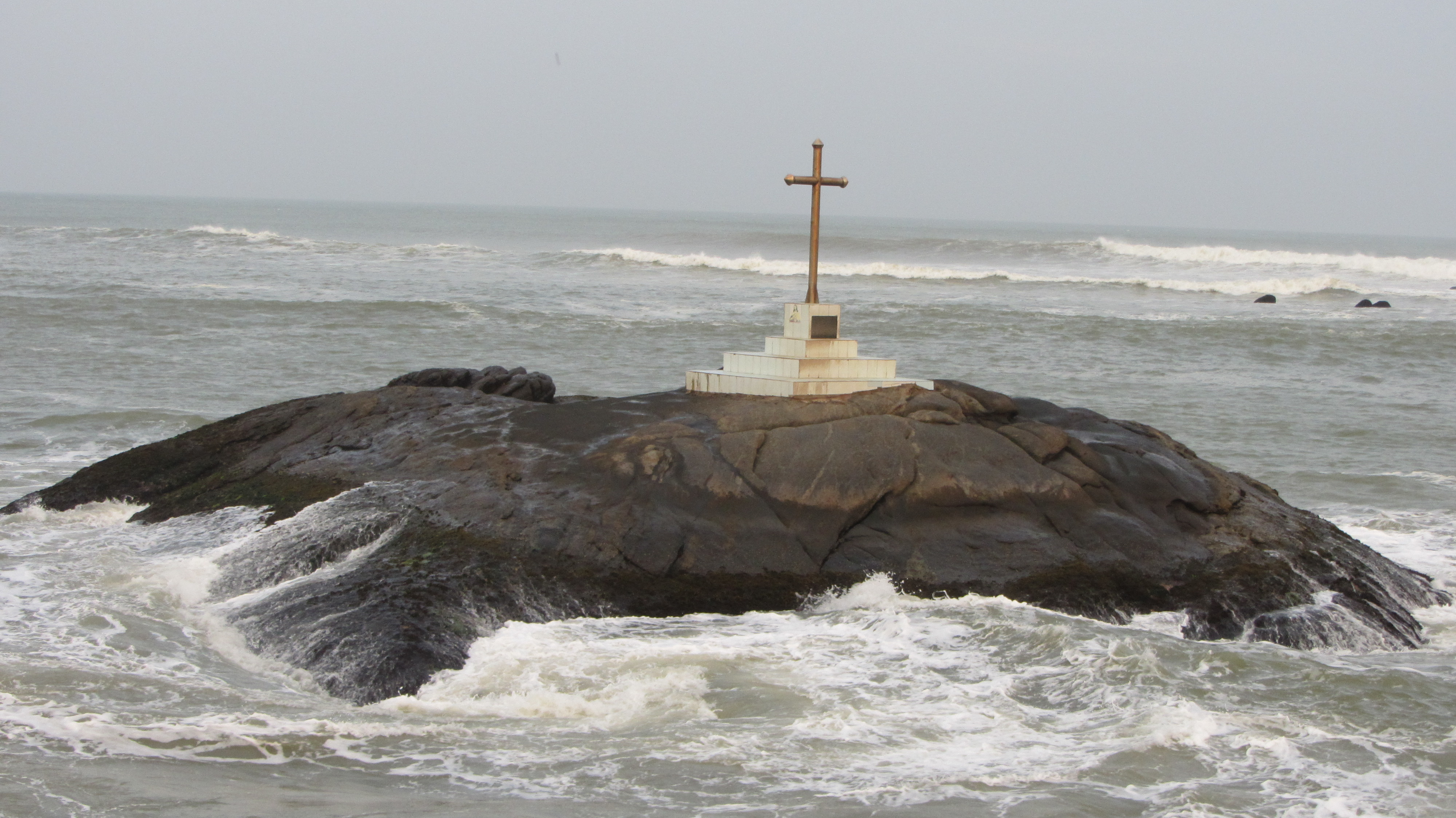

- Location within Tamil Nadu
- Coordinates: 8.094345°N 77.561445°E
- Country: India
- State: Tamil Nadu
- District: Kanyakumari
- Established: late 1970s

Government
  - Chairman: E. Silvester s/o Ennasiyar

Area
  - Total: 0.78 km^{2} (0.30 sq mi)
- Elevation: 200 m (660 ft)

Population (2012)
  - Total: 15,000

Languages
  - Official: Tamil
  - Spoken languages: Tamil; English
- Time zone: UTC+5:30 (IST)
- PIN: 629 702
- Telephone code: 91-4652 (Chinnamuttom Village)
- Vehicle registration: TN 74 & 75

Chinnamuttom is a special-grade village in Kanyakumari District in the state of Tamil Nadu in India. Chinnamuttom is at the southernmost point of the Indian subcontinent. Chinnamuttom mostly consist of roman catholic paravar (Fernandez and Gomez) people. The nearest town is Kanyakumari, a special-grade township and an international tourist spot 1.5 km (1 mi) away. Nagercoil, the administrative headquarters of Kanyakumari District, is 24 km (15 mi) away.

== Etymology ==
The name comes from Tamil word Muttu (Tamil: முட்டு); (முட்டு = Edge).

== Geography ==
Chinnamuttom is located at 8.094345°N 77.561445°E, at an altitude of 200 metres (660 ft). Though the coastal areas of Kanyakumari District are at the juncture of the Western Coastal Plains and Eastern Coastal Plains, Chinnamuttom is the only coastal area that lies on the Eastern Coastal Plains. Chinnamuttom is surrounded by sea on three sides. The coastal area has black sand and is rich in minerals. There are numerous illegal mines near Chinnamuttom's coastal area.

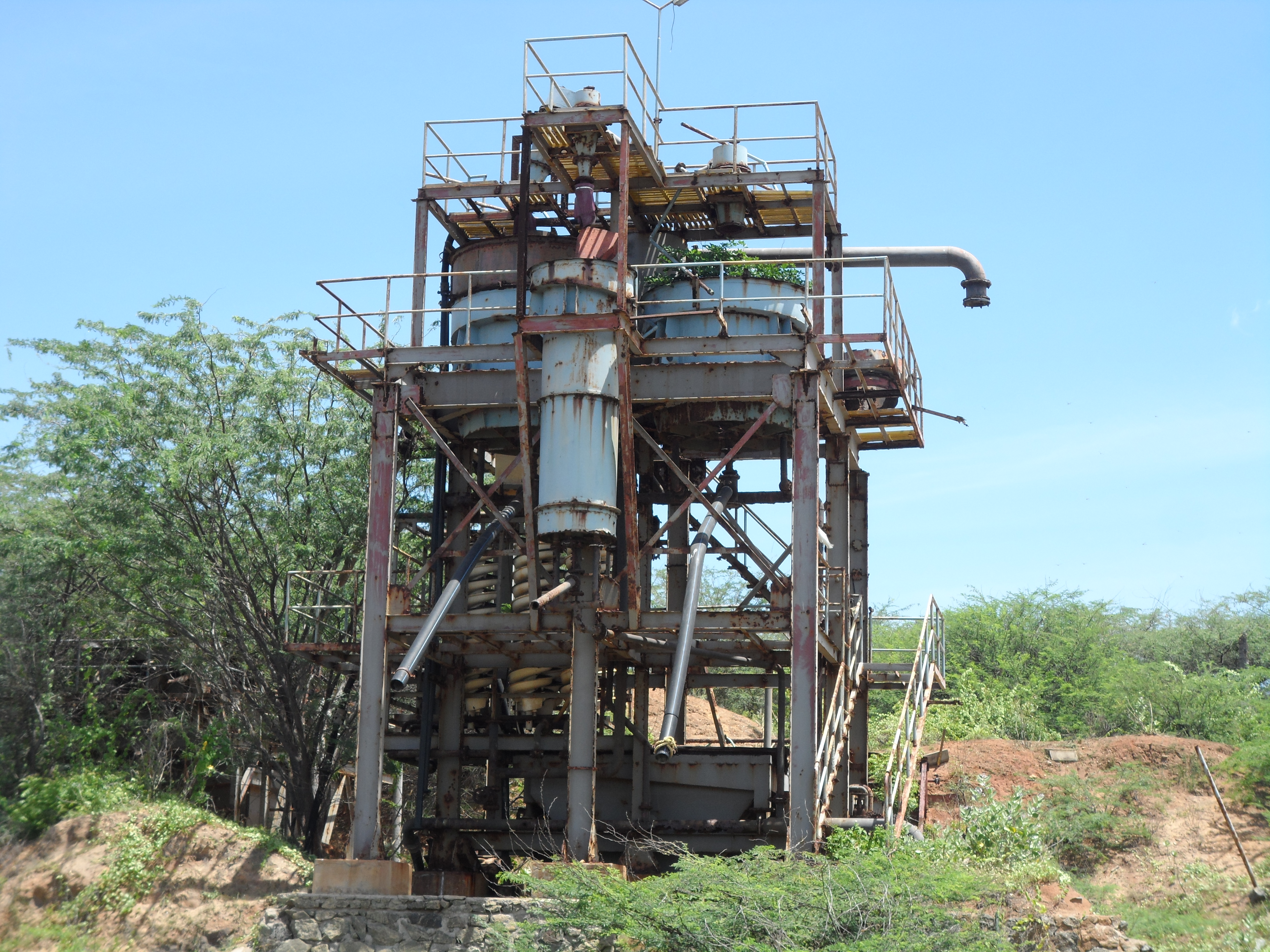
Old mine

== Climate ==
Chinnamuttom experiences a vast amount of rainfall during the Monsoon season. The annual rainfall is approximately 1,465 millimetres (57.7 in). Temperatures vary from 20 to 35 °C (68 to 95 °F).

The following table shows the climate data for chinnamuttom:

Climate data for Chinnamuttom
Month	Jan	Feb	Mar	Apr	May	Jun	Jul	Aug	Sep	Oct	Nov	Dec	Year
Mean daily maximum °C (°F)	28.9 (84.0)	30.6 (87.1)	32.2 (90.0)	32.7 (90.9)	32.4 (90.3)	30.7 (87.3)	31.8 (89.2)	31.9 (89.4)	30.6 (87.1)	30.4 (86.7)	30.1 (86.2)	29.3 (84.7)	31.0 (87.7)
Mean daily minimum °C (°F)	23.4 (74.1)	23.8 (74.8)	25.1 (77.2)	26.1 (79.0)	26.1 (79.0)	24.6 (76.3)	24 (75)	24 (75)	24.3 (75.7)	24.3 (75.7)	24 (75)	23.8 (74.8)	24.5 (76.0)
Average rainfall mm (inches)	13.6 (0.54)	13.2 (0.52)	27.3 (1.07)	62.1 (2.44)	54.2 (2.13)	84.1 (3.31)	47.4 (1.87)	39 (1.5)	45 (1.8)	126.6 (4.98)	166.5 (6.56)	55.3 (2.18)	734.3 (28.9)
Average precipitation days	1.4	1.7	2.6	4.1	4.2	11.3	9	6.5	5.5	10.1	11.2	5.3	72.9
Source: World Weather Information Service

== Religion ==
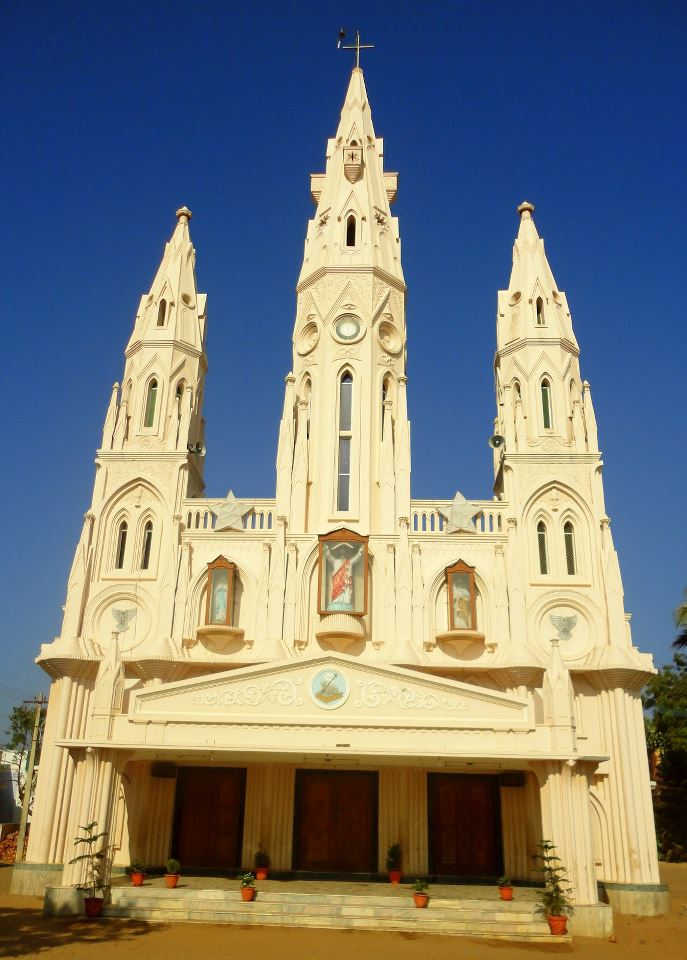
Saint Thomas Church

After separating from Kanyakumari, a Roman Catholic parish was created during the late 1990s in the name of Thomas the Apostle, who visited India in 52 AD. The first mass was held by Rt. Rev. Fr. Leon Dharmaraj, the Bishop of Roman Catholic Diocese of Kottar. There were about 800 families in this original church. In October, there is a pilgrimage festival that lasts for 10 days.

=== Gallery ===
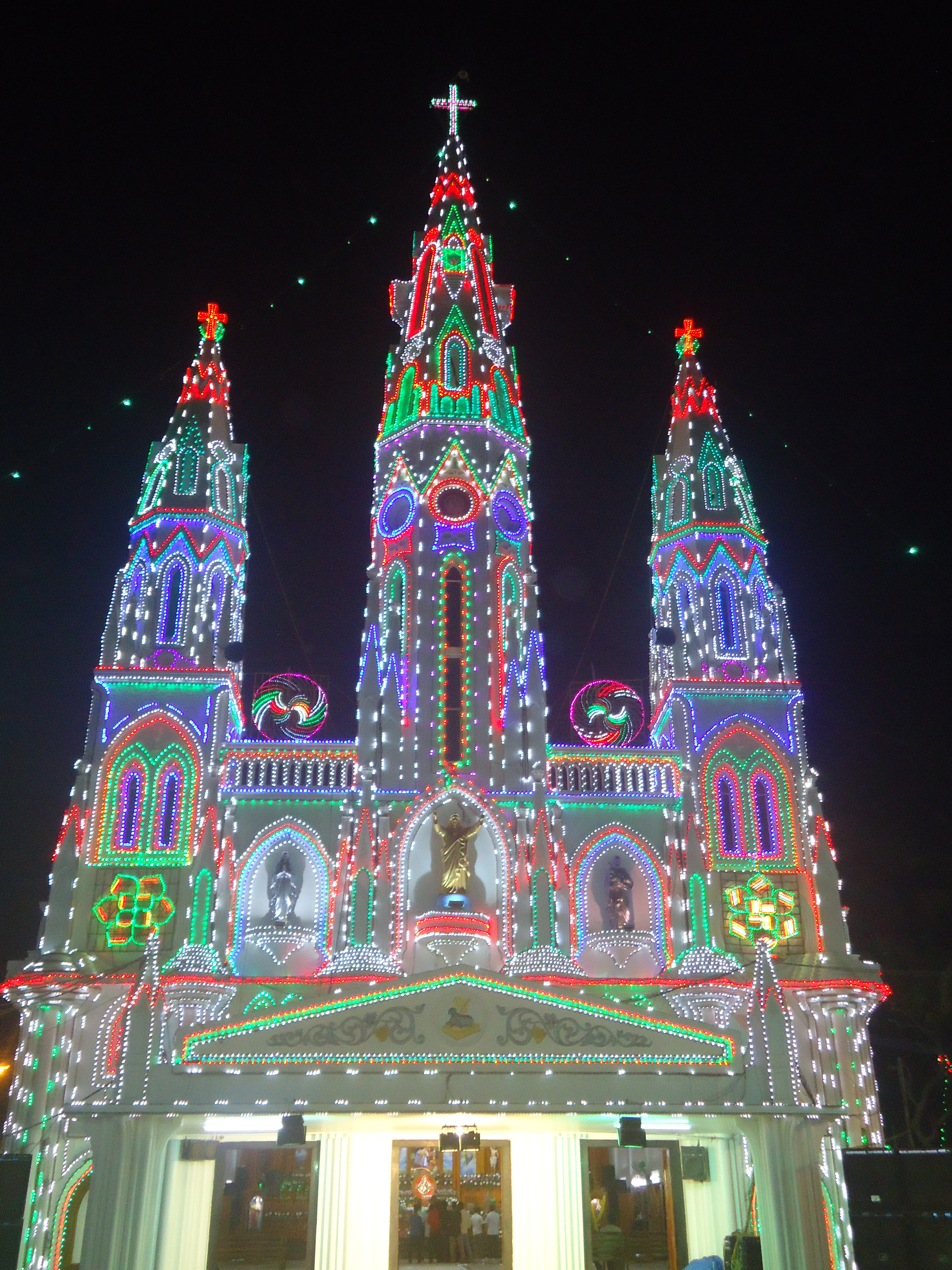

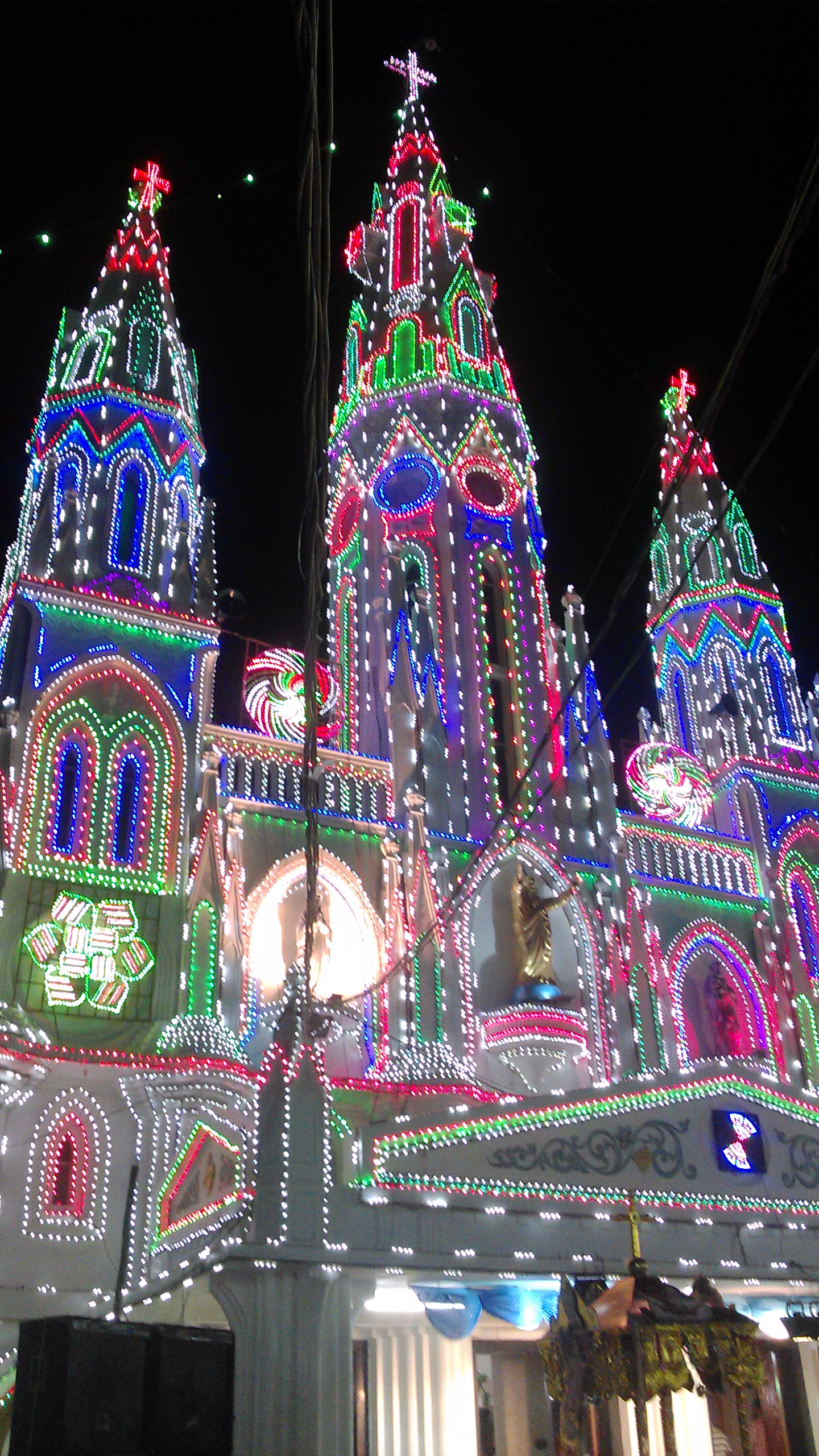

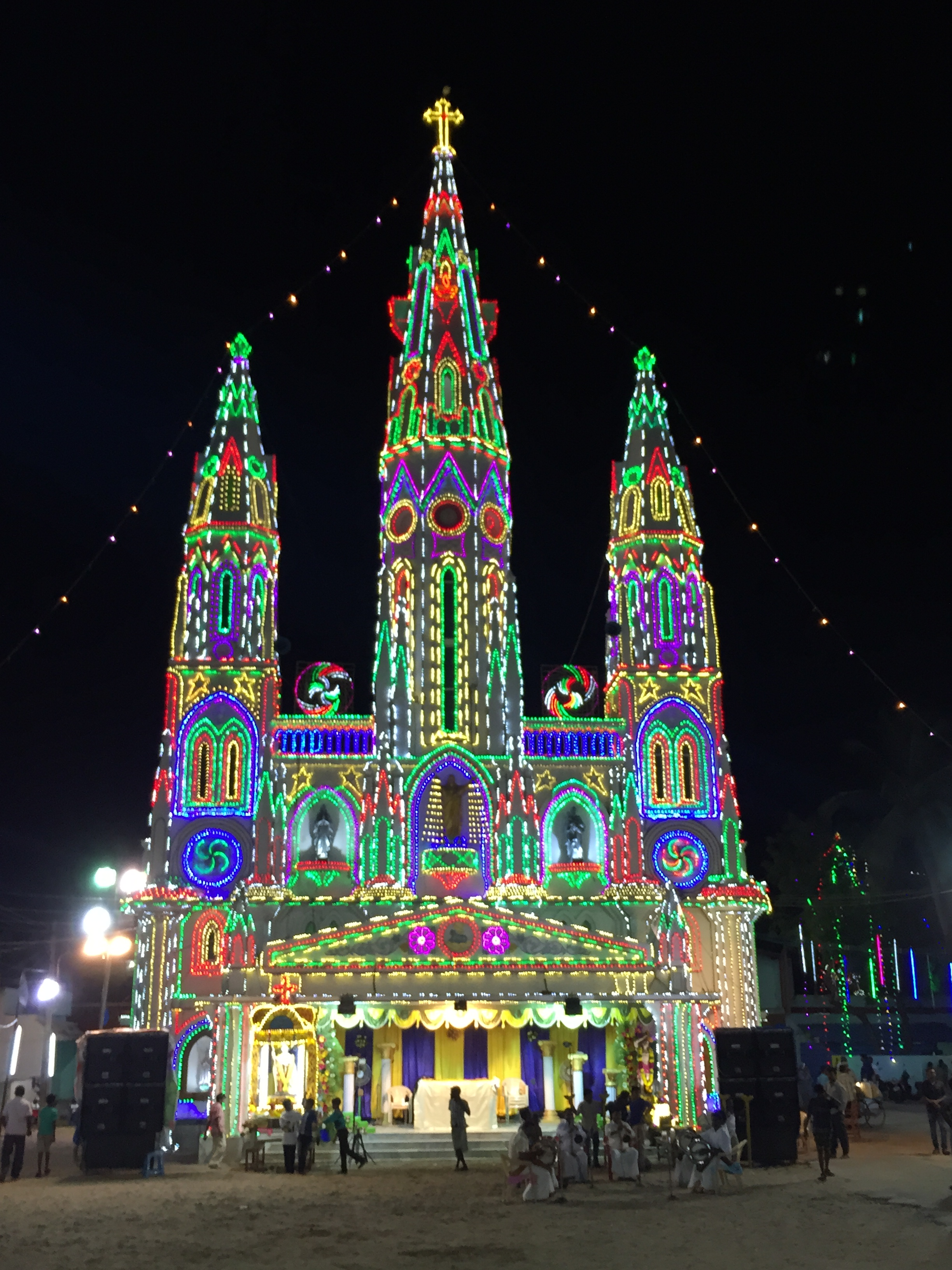

== Fishing harbours ==
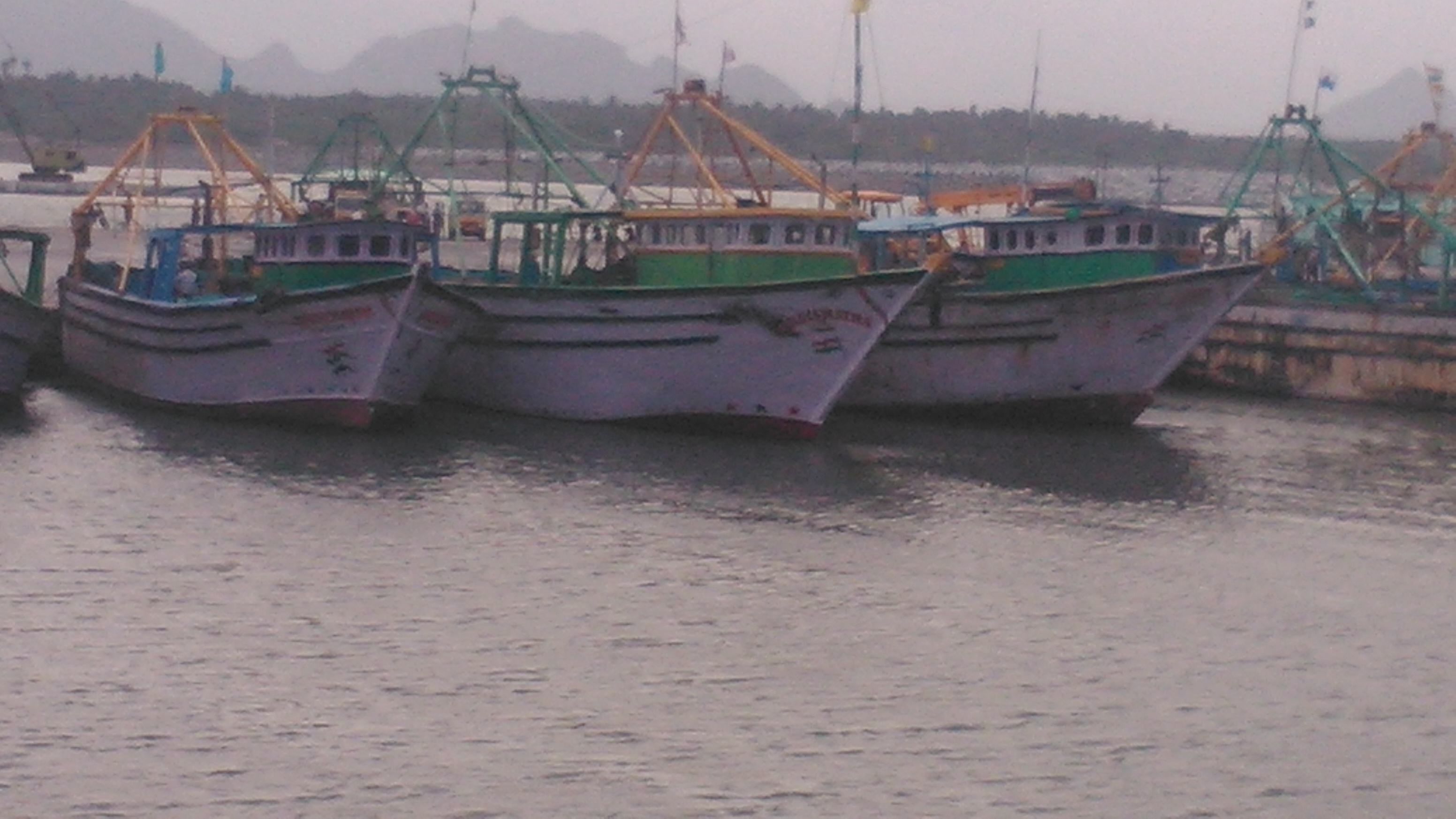
Chinnamuttom Harbour

Along Tamil Nadu's 1,076 km (669 mi) coastline, there are 3 major fishing harbours, 4 medium fishing harbours, and 10 fish-landing centres developed for safe berthing of boats and for hygienic landing and handling of fish catches.

Chinnamuttom has the only fishing harbour in Kanyakumari District. The harbour was constructed between 1984 and 1994 at the cost of 684.70 lakhs under a 50% Government of India (GOI) grant. The construction of the harbour encouraged the local fishing fleet to grow from 70 mechanized boats and 100 country boats to 143 mechanized boats, 166 country boats and 20 fibre-reinforced boats by 1994. The fishing season is June to March. During the months of April and May, the vessels are not allowed into the sea due to the fishes' reproductive season, and are instead moved to dry-land and are repaired, painted, and refreshed in the vessel-building yard.

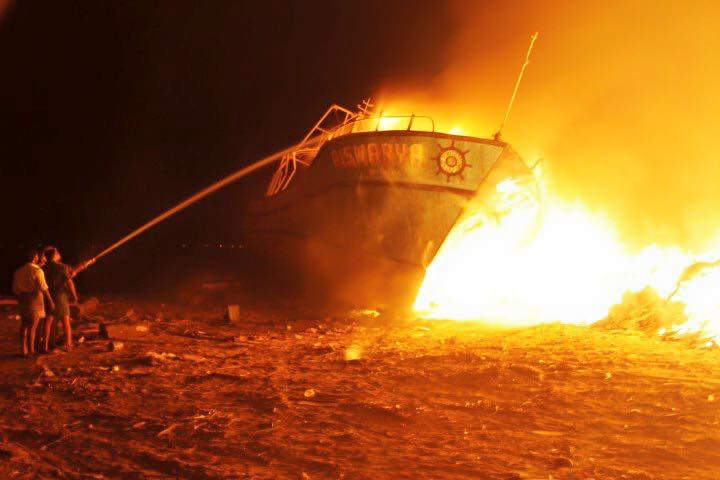

=== Expansion of harbour ===
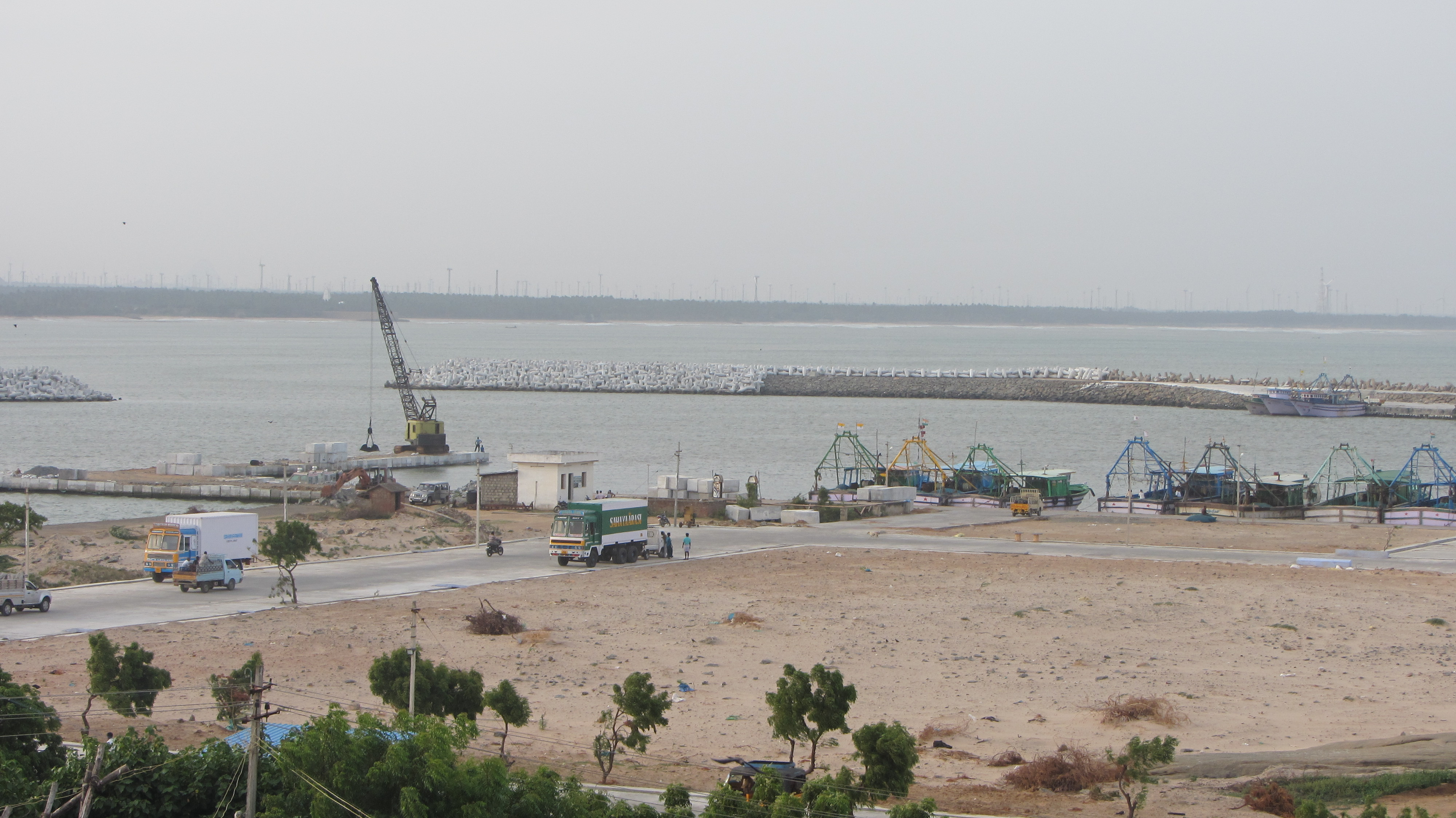
Expansion of Harbour, 2013

The harbour was badly damaged in the 2004 tsunami. After conducting various studies, the state government decided to carry out an expansion work. The existing eastern breakwaters area were lengthened and a new breakwater area formed on the western side. Once expanded, the harbour could house 150 more mechanized boats, benefiting around 1,500 fishermen.

As of 2013, there are 300 mechanized boats, 115 fibre-reinforced boats and 15 country boats in the harbour. Another 500 mechanized boats from the nearby areas use the harbour.

=== Marine Police ===
A three-level Coastal Security Scheme (CSS) is being implemented to safeguard the Indian coast. One of the (CSS) measures is Marine Police, who patrol up to 12 nautical miles from the coast. The Tamil Nadu coastline of 1,076 kilometres (669 mi) is to be guarded by 12 Marine Police stations, 10 outposts, and 100 check posts. In Kanyakumari District, Chinnamuttom and Colachel have Marine Police stations. As of 2009, there are typically 6–7 coastal security boats in Chinnamuttom Harbour.

== Indian Ocean Tsunami ==
The 2004 Indian Ocean earthquake and tsunami caused significant damage to the harbour. The tsunami arrived in the states of Andhra Pradesh and Tamil Nadu along the southeast coast of the Indian mainland shortly after 9:00 a.m. At least two hours later, it arrived in the state of Kerala along the southwest coast. Tamil Nadu and Kerala were extensively damaged, while Andhra Pradesh sustained moderate damage. On the southeast coast it arrived at 9:05 a.m. at Visakhapatnam, 9:05 a.m. at Kakinada, 9:05 a.m. at Chennai, and 9:37 a.m. at Tuticorin. On the southwest coast it arrived at 11:10 a.m. at Kochi and 12:25 p.m. at Marmagoa. There were two to five waves of varying amplitude. The water receded after the first wave struck.

On the western coast, the run-up elevations were 4.5 metres (15 ft) at Kanyakumari District in Tamil Nadu. The time lapse between the waves also varied from about 15 to 90 minutes.
