= Rajavoor =

- village
- Location in Tamil Nadu, India Rajavoor (India)
- Coordinates: 8°11′06″N 77°29′51″E
- Country: India
- State: Tamil Nadu
- District: Kanyakumari

Languages
  - Official: Tamil
- Time zone: UTC+5:30 (IST)
- PIN: 629402
- Vehicle registration: TN 74
- Nearest city: Nagercoil
- Lok Sabha constituency: Kanyakumari
- Website: http://www.stmichaelshrine.org/

Rajavoor is a village located in Agastheeswaram Taluk of Kanniyakumari District of Tamil Nadu.

Previously Rajavoor was called as Vanchimarthandanalloor in some land registration documents during the reign of Travancore Princely State ruled by Maharajas (refer Nagam Ayya's 'State Manual of Travancore').

Rajavoor has nearly 99% Catholic population. Rajavoor is popularly known for St. Michael's Shrine which is located at the center part of Rajavoor. The annual feast starts on the first Friday of May with a flag hoisting followed by a ten-day Mass and adoration. The eighth, ninth and tenth days are marked with a car procession to St. Michael Archangel, carnival ended with High Mass in front of the Holy Cars. The Roman Catholics and parish are administered by the Kottar Diocese.

Another notable church, Our Lady of Presentation (Kaanikkai Maathaa) Church is attached to the Rajavoor Parish as Sub-station. The annual feast starts on the last Friday of January with a flag hoisting followed by a ten-day Mass and adoration. The ninth and tenth day are marked with a car procession to Our Lady of Presentation Church.

Rajavoor is facilitated with Government Upgraded Primary Health center, the land and hospital building worth about one crore was donated by the people of Rajavoor and newly modified St. Michael High school. The school was established in the year 1922.
