= Alanchi =

- village
- Location in Tamil Nadu, India
- Coordinates: 8.17°N 77.24°E
- Country: India
- State: Tamil Nadu
- District: Kanyakumari

Government
  - Parish Priest: Rev. Fr. Maria Soosai Vincent

Population (2011)
  - Total: 9,000

Languages
  - Official: Tamil
- Time zone: UTC+5:30 (IST)
- PIN: 629159
- Telephone code: 91-4651
- Vehicle registration: TN 75
- Website: www.alanchi.com

Alanchi (or Alanchy) is a small village in Kanyakumari district, Tamil Nadu, India.

== History ==
Christianity set foot in Alanchy during the days of St. Francis Xavier, in the 1540s. Today, 99% of the Alanchy people are Catholics. The Catholic Church in Alanchy is 180 years old. The first church was established by Carmelite missionaries, Rev Fr Elias and Fr Martin. The present church is the third church. There is a belief among the people of Alanchy that the Stone Cross, currently placed in the Church porch, was erected by St. Francis Xavier who is the patron saint of the church. There is also a convent in the village.

In early 1950s, Rev. Fr. C. M. Hillary laid the foundation stone for the modern Alanchy of today. He encouraged education among children and attempted establish a school.

During the time of Indian independence, Alanchi was a very poor village with very few houses and others living in huts. The primary occupation then was climbing palm trees and selling palm juices. Jaggery was also produced from palm juices. Over time, residents of Alanchi soon found opportunity in the growing Middle Eastern economy. Workers flocked to the Gulf Coast countries of Oman, Bahrain, the UAE, Kuwait, Saudi Arabia, and Qatar. By the 1990s Alanchi was completely transformed into a modern village.

== Geography ==
Alanchi (or Alanchy) is about 45 km (27 miles) from Trivandrum, the capital of Kerala, India. It is also about 25 km (15 miles) from Nagercoil, the headquarters of Kanyakumari District.

== Demographics ==
Christianity is the primary religion of Alanchi, except for a few families of Hindus and Muslims.

The official language of the area is Tamil, which is spoken by all the residents of the village. The Malayalam language is also used.
