= Vadakkanadu =

- Village
- Country: India
- State: Tamil Nadu
- District: Kanyakumari

Population
  - Total: 3,000
  - Density: 30/km^{2} (78/sq mi)

Languages
  - Official: Tamil
- Time zone: UTC+5:30 (IST)
- PIN: 629177
- Telephone code: 04651
- Vehicle registration: TN 75
- Nearest city: Marthandam
- Sex ratio: 40/60 ♂/♀
- Literacy: 100%
- Lok Sabha constituency: Kanyakumari
- Vidhan Sabha constituency: Padmanabhapuram
- Climate: Normal (Köppen)

Vadakkanadu is a hamlet located in Thiruvattar block of Kanyakumari district. The village is served by the Thiruvattar police station through its village outpost at Mecodes. The Ministry of Rural Development, Government of India has generated local employment though the building of a drainage system for the hamlet.

Asia’s biggest Mathur Aqueduct Hanging Trough is near to the Vadakkanadu village (from here 3 km). The village also has a beautiful river flowing east to west, with a bridge modeled after the Mathur Aqueduct.

CSI Pastorate Church Pullani in Vadakkanad, is an around 88-year-old church.
