= Kottagom =

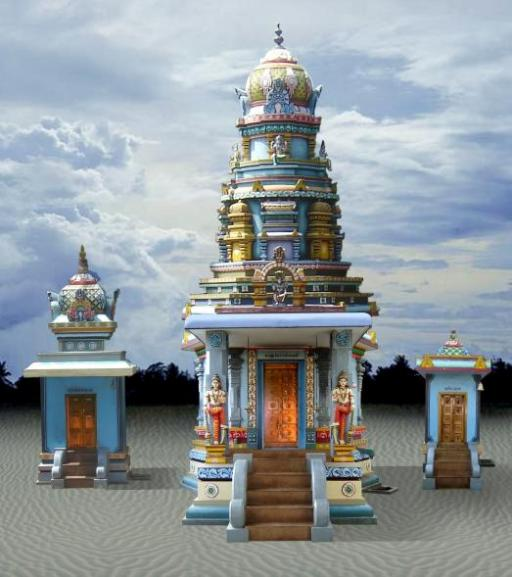
Sree Krishnan Temple, Kottagom

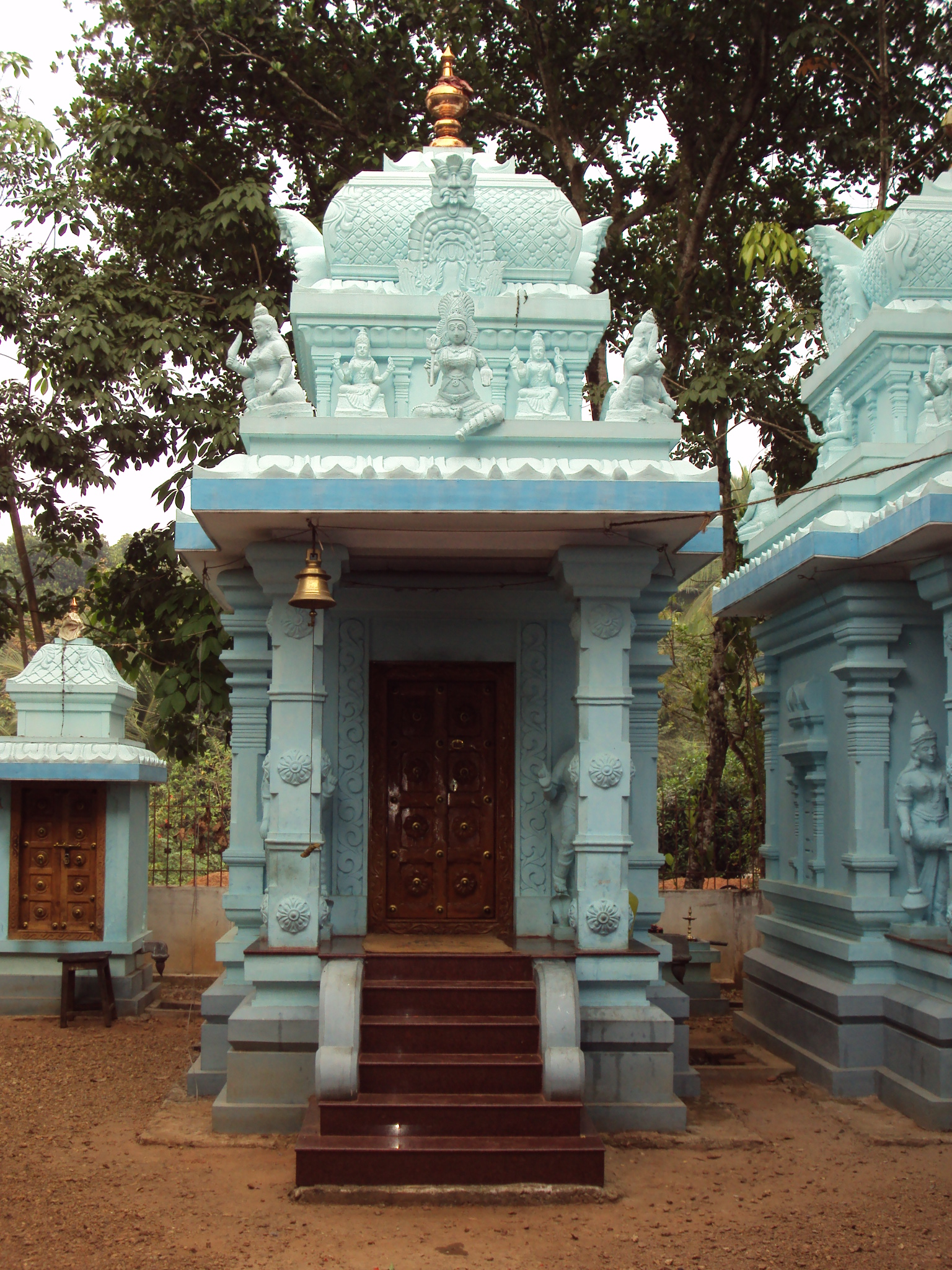
Muttakuzhi Vilai Amman Temple

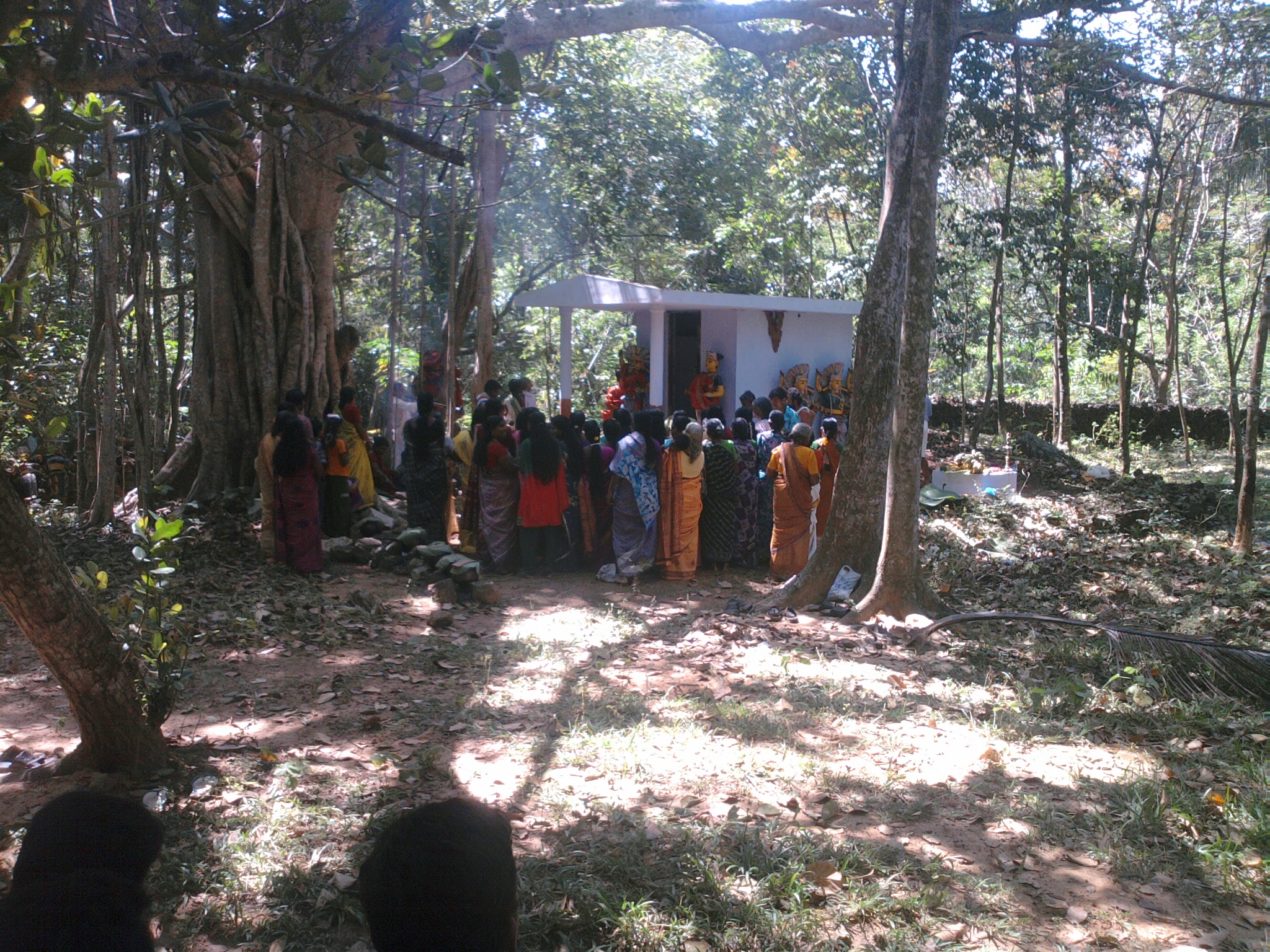
Kollennalai Kavu Temple

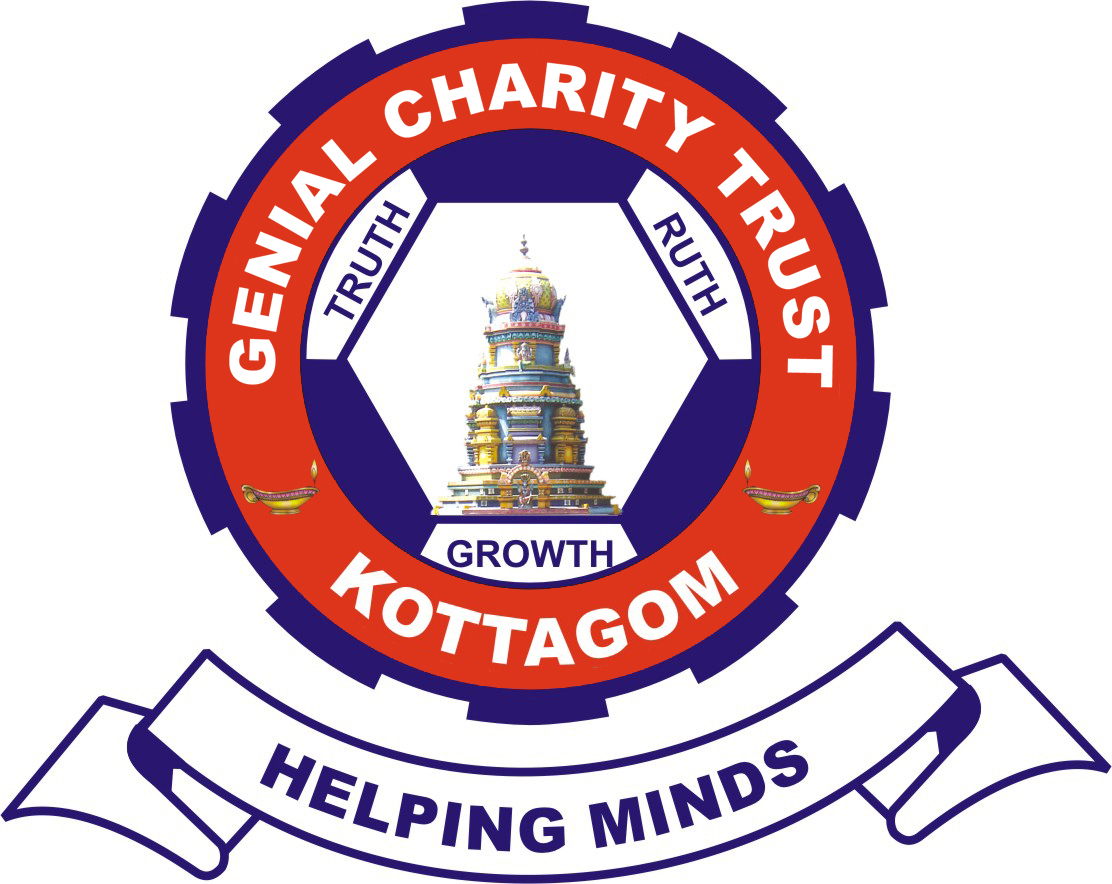
Helping Minds Genial Charity Trust Logo

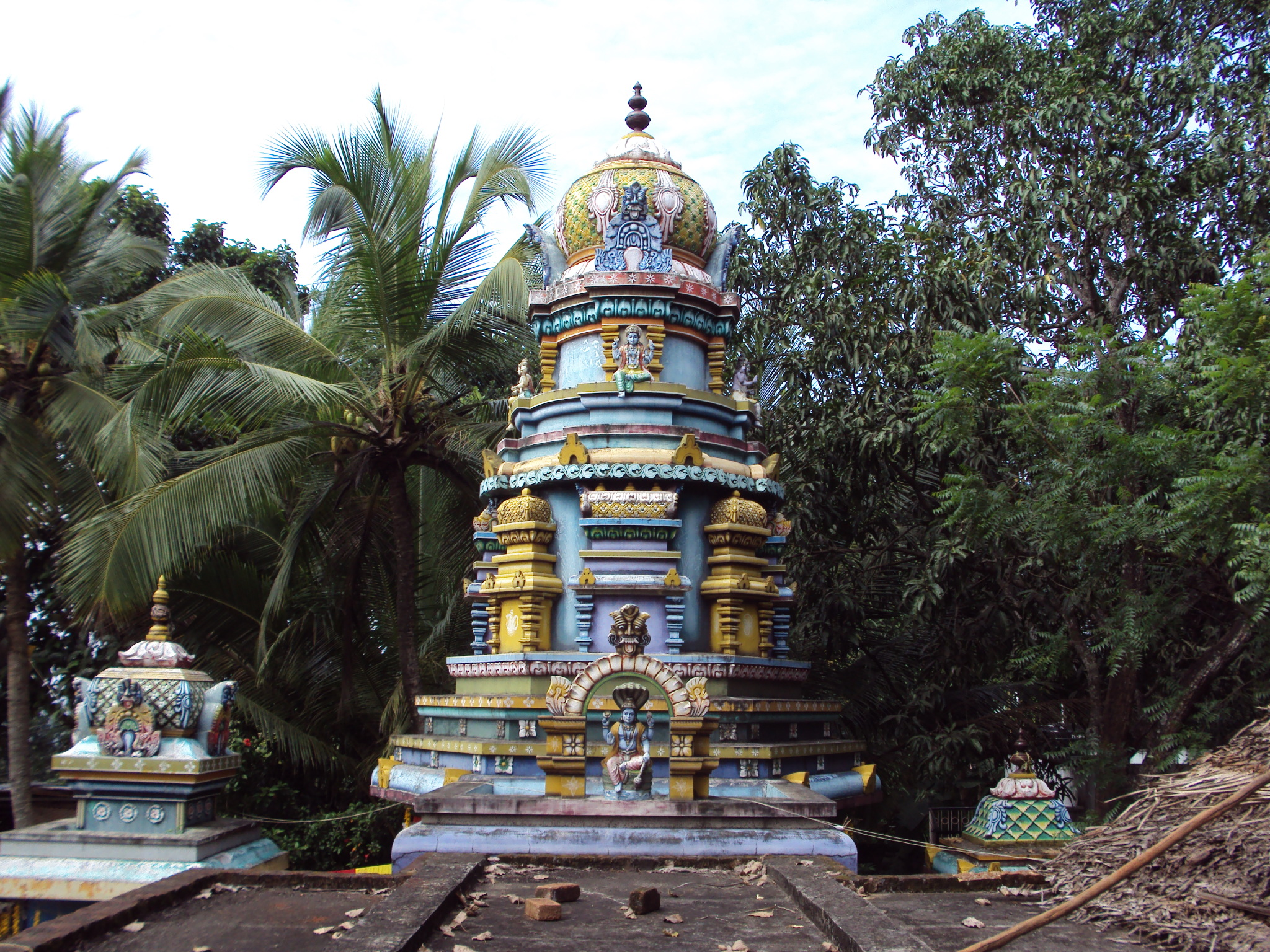
Temple

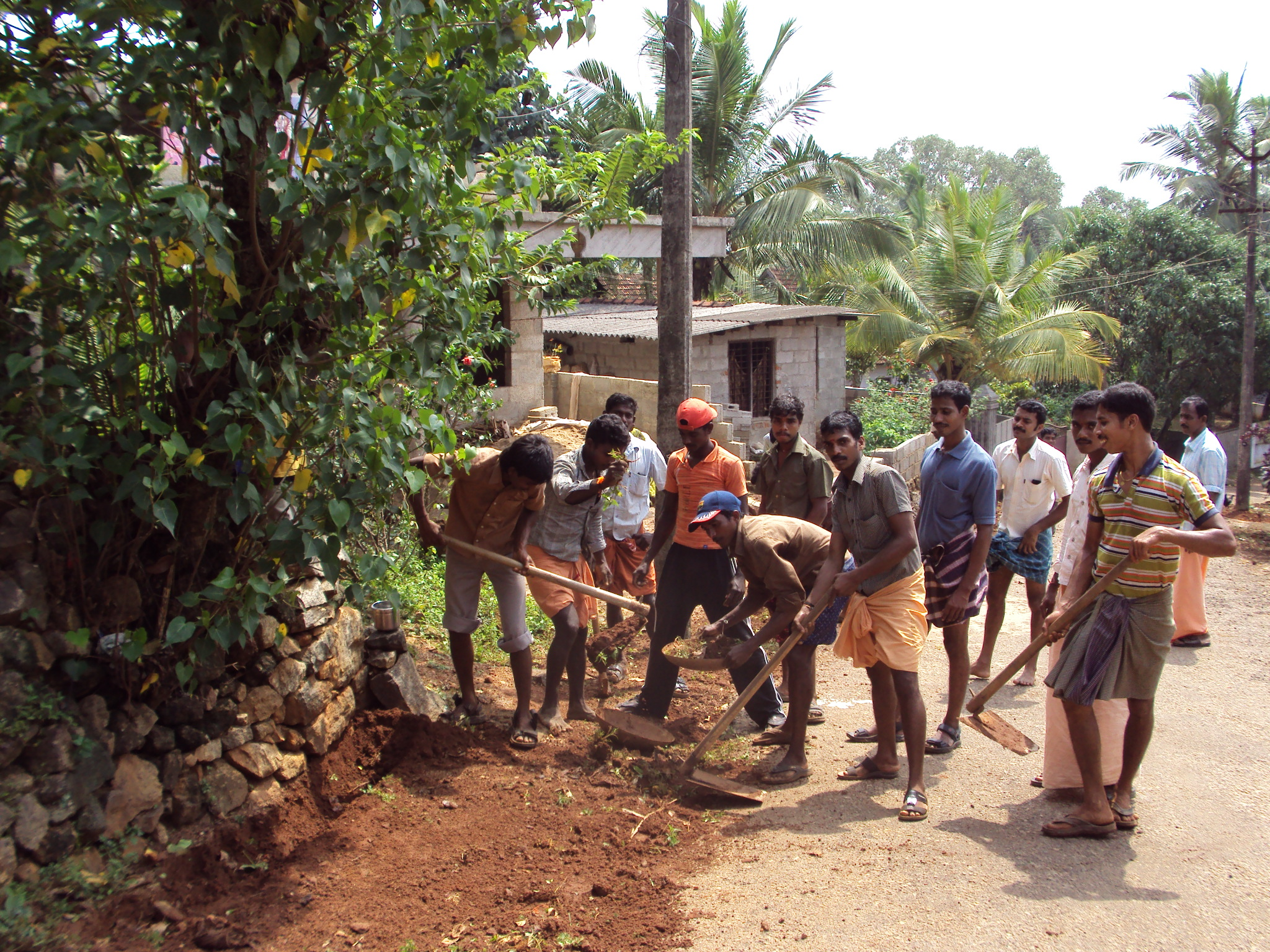
Vyasar Ilaignar narpanimantam cleaning the road

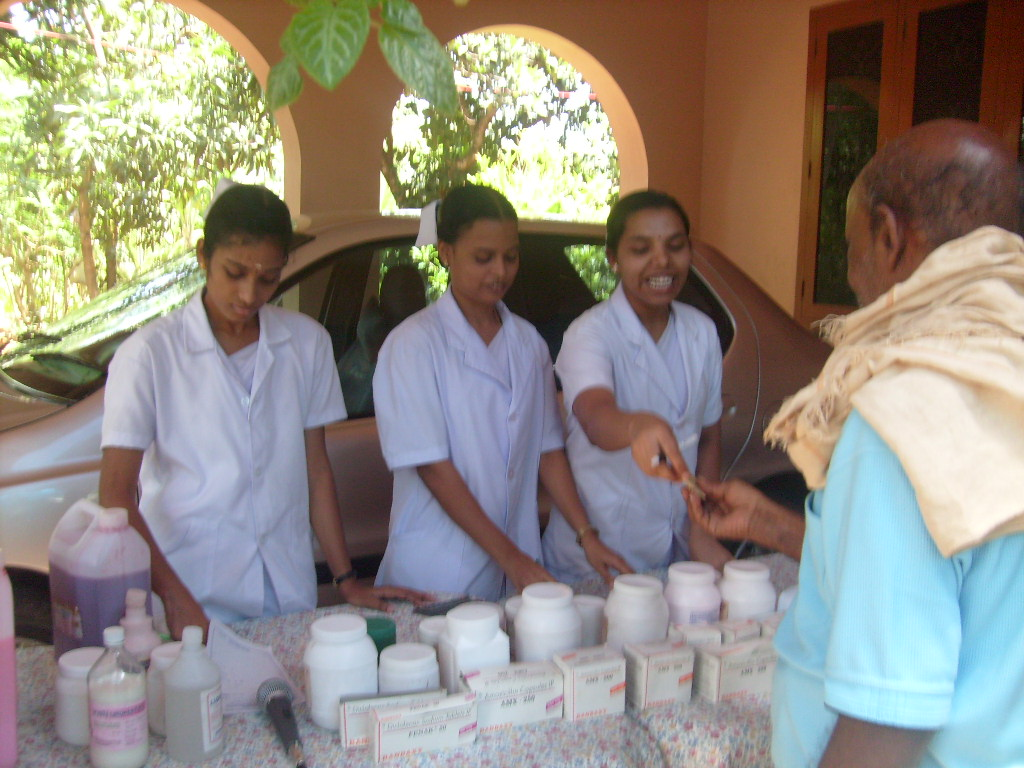
Free Medical Checkup & Blood Donation Camp

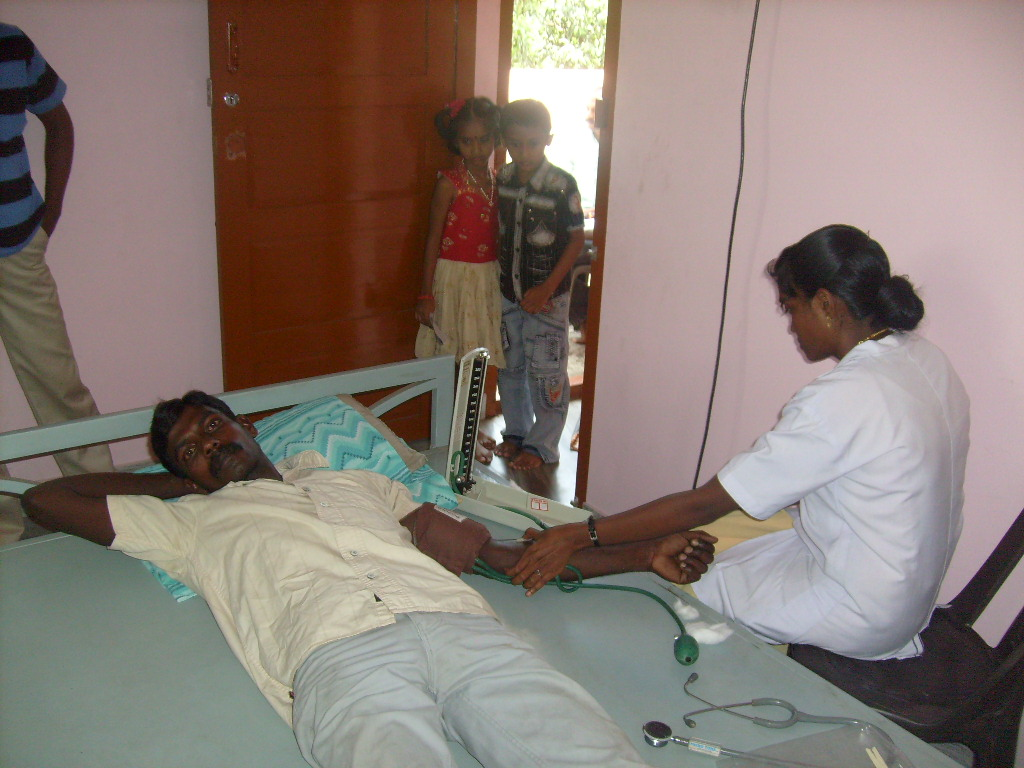
Free Medical Checkup & Blood Donation Camp

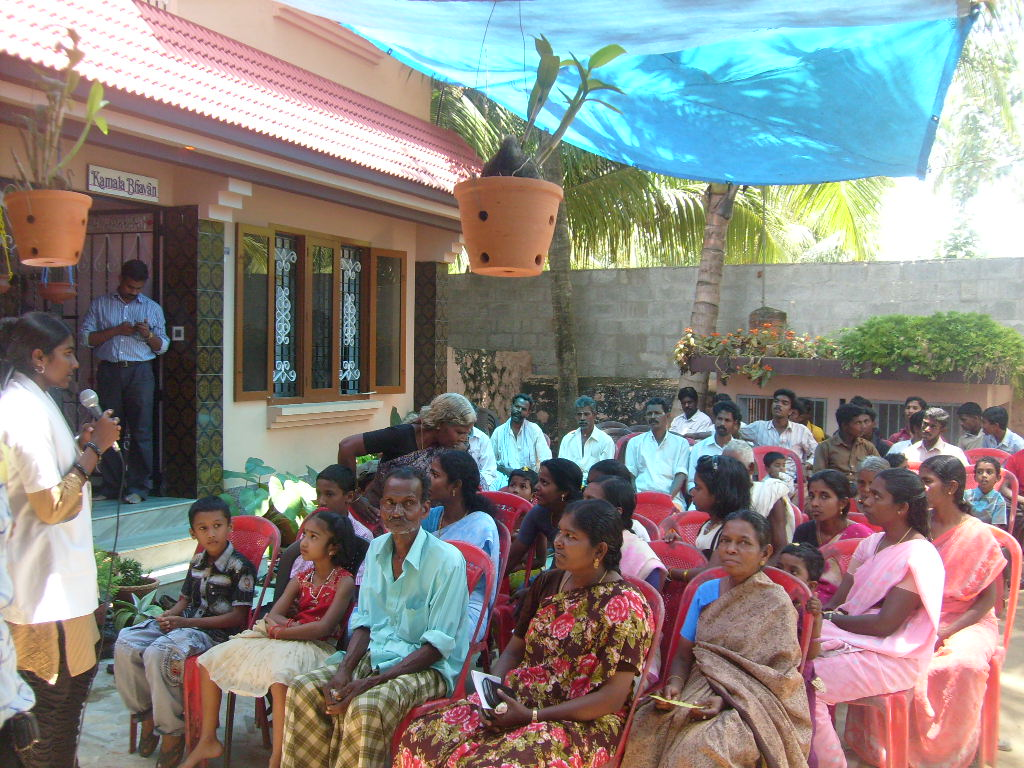
Free Medical Checkup & Blood Donation Camp

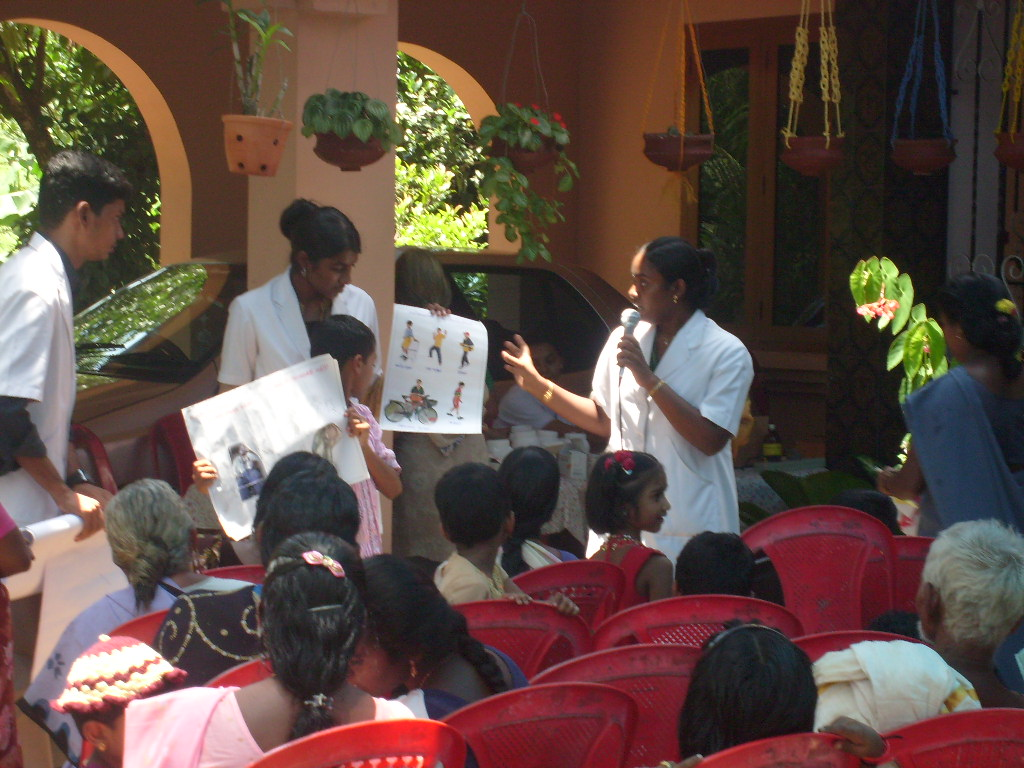
Free Medical Checkup & Blood Donation Camp

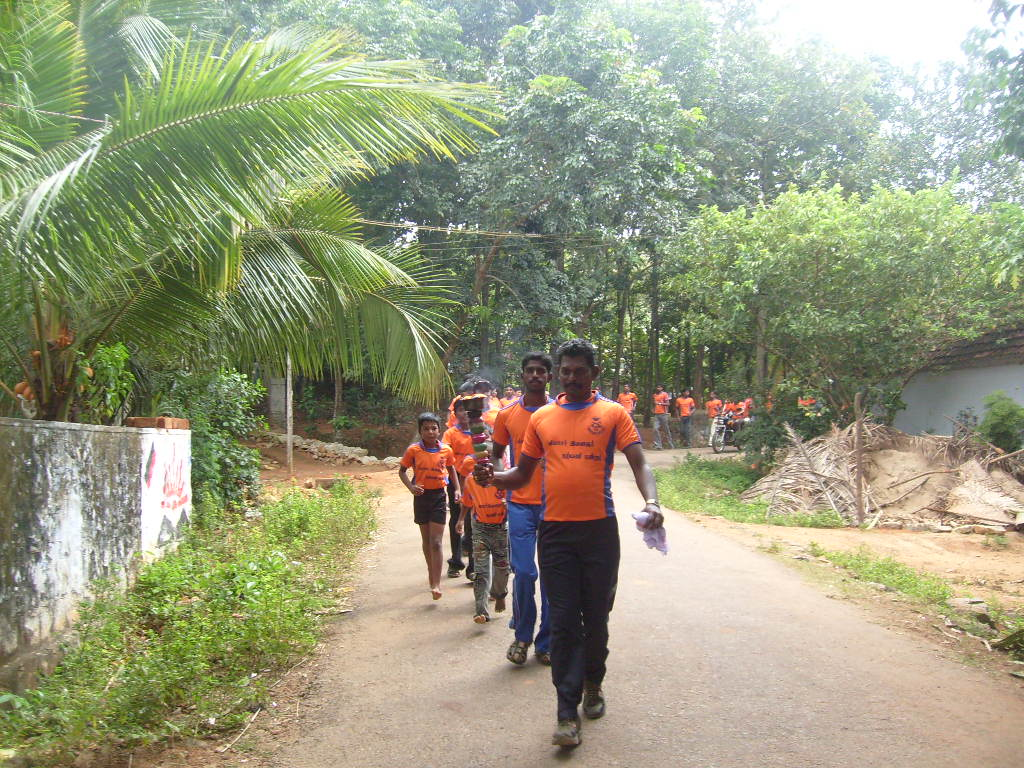
Vyasar Ilaignar narpanimantam Jothi Ottam

Kottagom is a village located near Marthandam, Kanyakumari District, Tamil Nadu, India. The village is home to more than 300 families. The main three family names are Mutakuzhi Vilai, Melan Vilai, and Pitchan Vilai.
