= Karavilai Gram Panchayat =

Village in Kanniyakumari, Tamil Nadu, India

Karavilai is a small village in the Villukuri panchayat, Kanniyakumari district, in the Indian state of Tamil Nadu.

Most of the family resides belongs to Krishnavaha community.
