= Kusavankuzhi =

Kusavankuzhi is a village in Kanyakumari district in Tamil Nadu, India.
