= Atchenkulam =

- village
- Location in Tamil Nadu, India Atchenkulam (India)
- Coordinates: 8.126°N 77.520°E
- Country: India
- State: Tamil Nadu

Languages
  - Official: Tamil
- Time zone: UTC+5:30 (IST)

Atchenkulam is a village in Kanyakumari District, Tamil Nadu. The village is 1 km from Kottaram, part of Kottaram town Panchayat and comes under Agastheeswaram taluk. The village has a pond of almost lake size at the entrance. Next to the pond is a river, Puthanar Channel. Next comes the 120+ years old CSI Church, the newly built Church is very nice. The village has about 300 families of different religions. The main occupation of the local people is agriculture.

This village is located on the way to kanyKumari from nagercoil.
