= Kodimunai =

- village
- Location in Tamil Nadu, India Kodimunai (India)
- Coordinates: 8.17°N 77.24°E
- Country: India
- State: Tamil Nadu

Government
  - Body: Gram panchayat

Population (2012)
  - Total: 9,078(estimation)

Languages
  - Official: Tamil and malayalam
- Time zone: UTC+5:30 (IST)
- PIN: 629251
- Website: www.kodimunai.com

Kodimunai is a coastal fishing village located 22 km north-west of Kanyakumari at Southern Arabian seashore in the Indian state of Tamil Nadu. The nearest major city is Thiruvananthapuram (capital of India state of Kerala) around 68 km from here. There is a rock located offshore which is the second largest rock in Tamil Nadu.

== Geography ==
Kodimunai is located at 8.17°N 77.24°E.

== Demographics ==
As of 2010 Population count, Kottar Diocese census, Kodimunai had a population of 7250(estimated). Males constitute 51% of the population and females 49%. This consists of around 2,200 families. Kodimunai has an average literacy rate of 70%, higher than the national average of 59.5%: male literacy is 70%, and female literacy is 60%. In Kodimunai, Majority of the population belong to the Roman Catholic Mukkuvar community.

== Local economy ==
A significant number of the residents of Kodimunai have jobs related to fishing. This includes deep sea fishing, shallow water fishing, fishing from the shore ( shore seine fishing, known as karamadi in the local language but also locally know as karaivalai), fishing with mechanized boats, exporting fish, etc. Many of them work in a number of other fields like IT, medicine, education, engineering, trading, cargo shipping, etc. However, there is no noticeable local industry except for fishing. even most of the people discovered the passion towards fishing.

== Places to visit ==
Since Kodimunai is surrounded with water, there is a numerous amount of beaches. Kodimunai beach is the local beach located right in the village. Its famously known for its offshore rocks, seasonal shellfish and mussels, and the local church nearby.

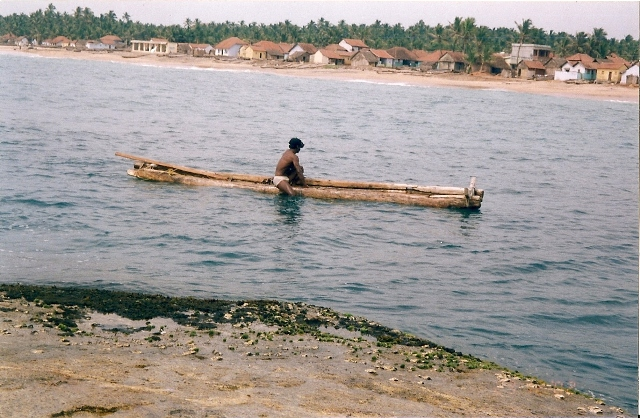
A Single fisherman of Kodimunai sets out for fishing in his catamaran

== Educational institutions ==
- St. Michael's primary school
- St. Michael's high school
