= West Parasery =

West Parasery Merku parasery
- village
- Location in Tamil Nadu, India West Parasery (India)
- Coordinates: 8.2072°N 77.3556°E
- Country: India
- State: Tamil Nadu

Population
  - Total: 300

Languages
  - Official: Tamil
- Time zone: UTC+5:30 (IST)
- Postal code: 629180

West Parasery is a village situated in Kalkulam taluk of Kanyakumari district, Tamil Nadu, India. It is nearby Nagercoil town.
