= Kombavilai =

- village
- Country: India
- State: Tamil Nadu
- District: Kanyakumari

Languages
  - Official: Tamil
- Time zone: UTC+5:30 (IST)
- Telephone code: 04652 - 258 xxx

Kombavilai is a village located in Agasteeswaram Taluk, Kanyakumari District, Tamil Nadu, India. The village is surrounded by paddy fields, coconut groves, element enriched and beautiful sea shore (Arabian Sea). Further, this village has a pleasant climate throughout the year and benefited by both north east and south west monsoons. The people are living harmoniously with religious diversity of worshiping Hindu Goddess Devi Mutharamman, Esakiamman, Swamy Sriman Ayya Narayanaswamy and Christians as minor population. Nearly two hundred people live here and most of the people are educated; kombavilai has an average literacy rate of 90%, far higher than the national average of 59.5%: male literacy is 91%, and female literacy is 89%. The Holy place of Swamythoppu pathy (Ayyavazhi) is located near Muhilankudierrupu, 7 km away

== Geographical location ==
Kombavilai is located at 5 km away from Kanyakumari on west coastal road and 16 km from Nagercoil (capital town of Kanyakumari on the road connecting Kanyakumari with Nagercoil and nearest city 80 km from Trivandrum (Kerala). It has an average elevation of 10 metres (10 feet). It lies at the Arabian Sea. It is situated at 8° 4′ 41″ N, 77° 32′ 28″ E.

== Institutions ==
An institution for Varmam kalai, an ancient form of art and medicinal value is started to protect the ancient values

== Economic activity ==
This village has agriculture as main economy with rice, banana and coconut cultivation. Some people work in rice field, plucking coconut and palm tree products are produced. Some part of population are working in service sector like teaching, Pharmacy, nursing and construction workers. There are many other household artwork related jobs are taken up by fever people. They include dolls made up of palm seed (பனம் கொட்டையில் வடித்த சாமி பொம்மைகள்), coconut sculpted god dolls, coir production from coconut based fibres, கத்தாளை நாரில் இழைத்த வென் பொம்மைகள்., கடல் சிப்பிகளில் கோர்த்த மாலைகள், etc. these fine crafted items are rich in artwork. They are also marketed in the nearby tourist places like kanyakumari,சுசீந்திரம், etc.

== Art and culture ==
சில சிறுகதை எழுத்தாளர்களும், ஐக்கூ கவிதைநடை முதல் நெடுங்கதை ஆசான்களும் இருந்தும் வாழ்ந்தும் மறைந்த ஓர் ஊராக திகழ்கின்றது. தொலைகாட்சி இல்லாத காலங்களில் மேடை நாடங்களில் கலை மற்றும் இலக்கியம் வளர்த்த சான்றோர்கள் இவ்வூரின் சாட்சி..
