= Kesavanputhenthurai =

Kesavanputhenthurai is a coastal village in Tamil Nadu, India. It is located 10-km from Nagercoil and 25-km from Kannyakumari.

Rice is the staple food of the people, although for some people in the hilly areas, tapioca is the main food. Though there are some vegetarians among the populace, a majority of the people use agro, meat and fish products. Fish caught in the seas around the district during the night or early morning hours reach the markets in the interior towns and villages in the early morning. The food is spicy, and the people in the district tend to use more grated coconut in their curries and food-preparations, like neighbouring Kerala.

As coconut trees are abundant in this place, the place might have derived its name from them. This village had, in ancient times, trade relations with foreign countries like Arabia.

Majority of the people speak Tamil, Malayalam and English. This village also boasts a high literacy rate. Majority of the men of this village indulge in the fishing business either here or abroad.

== Churches ==
Kesavanputhenthurai has a church called the Church of the Imm. Heart of Mary, which was established in 1964. Its length is 200 feet, 70 feet wide and height is 160 feet. The Central Dome of the church has a Virgin Mary. The church has a statue of the Blessed Immaculate Heart Of Mary. There are also three smaller churches: St. Holy cross church, St. Peter church and St. Michael Church Click here.

PONGAL

Every year the Pongal was celebrated in a very special manner. There was a lot of events conducted by village people. In 2017, the 50th Pongal day is going to be celebrated by village people.
