= North Sarel =

Narth Sarel is a village near Nagercoil, in the Kanyakumari district of Tamil Nadu, India.

Greatest Village Narth sarel in the southernmost Indian state of Tamil Nadu and a municipality and administrative headquarters of Kanyakumari District.
