= Kesavapuram =

Neighbourhood in Kanyakumari district, Tamil Nadu, India

- village
- Location in Tamil Nadu, India Kesavapuram (India)
- Coordinates: 13°14′27.86″N 79°44′15.09″E
- Country: India
- State: Tamil Nadu
- District: Kanyakumari

Languages
  - Official: Tamil
- Time zone: UTC+5:30 (IST)

Kesavapuram is a village in Thiruvattaru taluk, Kanyakumari district, Tamil Nadu. The village is part of the Viswnabhapuram legislative assembly constituency and the Kanyakumari parliamentary constituency. The village is located about 7 km north-east of Marthandam and 31 km north-west of Nagercoil.

The village is home to the St. Sebastian Church which is considered to be 100 years old.
