= Melpuram =

Coordinates: 12°28′N 77°48′E

- village
- Interactive map of Melpuram
- Country: India
- State: Tamil Nadu
- District: Kanyakumari
- Time zone: UTC+5:30 (IST)
- Postal code: 629168

Melpuram is a village in Kanyakumari district, Tamil Nadu, India.

Rubber plantation plays a role in this village's economy.

Melpuram is sandwiched by Pacode town panchayat and Edaicode town panchayat also the Melpuram union block. Christians and Hindus are the inhabitants of the Melpuram.

== History ==
Melpuram had been also a part of the Travancore Kingdom till India got freedom from the British. After India emerging as country, the small town was an enclave of the state of Kerala.

== Landmarks ==
Churches and Temples are notable landmarks of Melpuram. Among them, the [Assemblies of God Church] (AG), established in 1922 by missionaries, stands out as one of the oldest churches in India. It has played a pioneering role in spreading the gospel and has been instrumental in establishing many churches throughout the region. People worship Hindu village temples and Kudumpa Deva, devi swamis like Nagar Kavoo, Essakki Amman temples, Ayya Vaikundar Nilal Thangals with age-old temples. The other old Church near melpuram is Immanuel Lutheran Church Melpuram (near Aluvilai) established by American missionaries in 1947, India Elim Deva Sabai, which is called Elim church established in 1947, Saron Bethel Deva Sabai, which is called as Saron church established in 1979 by Rev D Samuel, Sree Navaneetha Krishna Temple, and the Sree Eeshwara Kaala Bhoothathaan Temple

== Economy ==
The rubber industry and cashewnut industry is a main income source of the people of melpuram. The agriculture of tapioca (Marichini kilangu) and palm tree are also diminishing sectors in the areas of Melpuram which was once considered as part of livelihood.
