= Vellicode =

Vellicode vellikodu
- village (Semi Urban Village type)
- Location in Tamil Nadu, India Vellicode (India)
- Coordinates: 8.273°N 77.280°E
- Country: India
- State: Tamil Nadu
- District: Kanyakumari

Government
  - Type: Democratic
  - Body: Kattathurai

Languages
  - Official: Tamil
- Time zone: UTC+5:30 (IST)
- PIN: 629167
- Telephone code: 914651
- Vehicle registration: TN 74, TN75
- Nearest city: Marthandam
- Literacy: 100%
- Lok Sabha constituency: Kanyakumari
- Assembly constituency: Padmanapuram
- Civic agency: Kattathurai
- Climate: Sub Tropical (Köppen)

Vellicode is a village located in Kanyakumari District of Tamil Nadu, India on National Highway 47 approximately 47 km south of Trivandrum.

Vellicode is a village which lies on the Trivandrum Kanyakumari Highway.
