= Kattathurai =

- Village
- Interactive map of Kattathurai
- Location in Tamil Nadu
- Coordinates: 8°16′50″N 77°16′35″E
- Country: India
- State: Tamil Nadu
- District: Kanyakumari

Kattathurai is a village located in Kanyakumari district of Tamil Nadu, India. It is on National Highway 47, approximately 44 km southeast of Trivandrum.
