= Kurunthancode =

Kurunthancode Kurunthancode
- town
- Country: India
- State: Tamil Nadu
- District: Kanyakumari

Languages
  - Official: Tamil
- Time zone: UTC+5:30 (IST)

Kurunthancode is a block or Panchayat Union of Kanyakumari district, India. It is one of the nine administrative divisions of the district of Kanyakumari. The present chairman of the Kurunthancode Panchayat union is [ANUSHA DEVI]. It includes the following Village Panchayats,

1. Kakkottuthalai
2. Kattimancode
3. Kurunthencode
4. Muttom
5. Nettancode
6. Simoncolony
7. Thalakulam
8. Tenkarai
9. Vellichandai
