= Aruvikkarai =

Village in Tamil Nadu, India

- Village
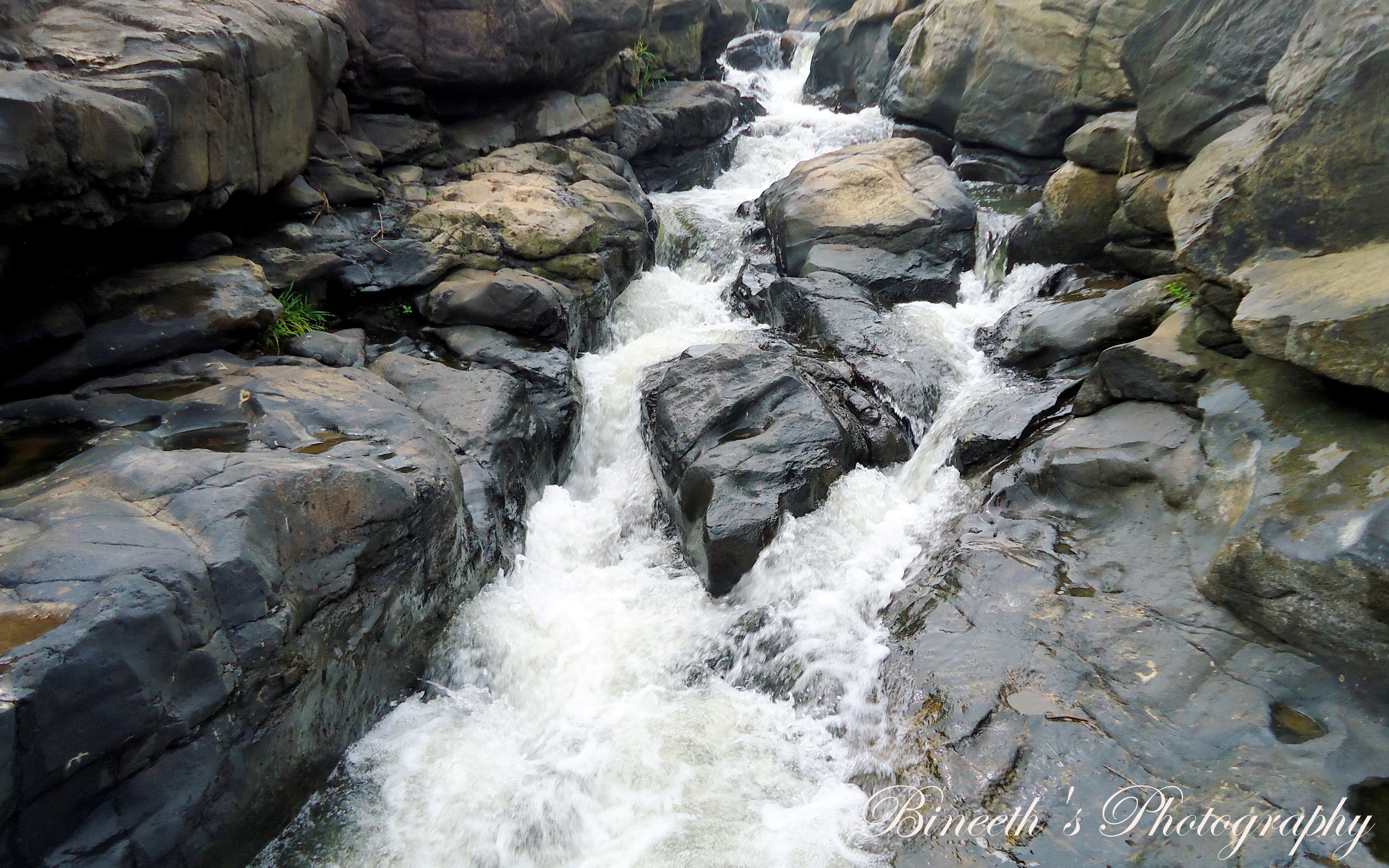
- The river situated at the back side of the temple
- Interactive map of Aruvikkarai
- Coordinates: 8°20′4.13″N 77°16′50.26″E
- Country: India
- State: Tamil Nadu
- District: Kanyakumari

Population (2011)
  - Total: 5,203

Aruvikkarai is a village near Thiruvattar in Kanyakumari district in the state of Tamil Nadu, India.

== Overview ==
Aruvikkarai lies near Thiruvattar, which is about 50 km (31 mi) from Thiruvananthapuram, Kerala. The nearest major city are Thiruvattar and Marthandam. Ponmanai is situated in the east, Thirparappu in the north-east and Arumanai in the north-west. Hanging Bridge at Mathur, Padmanabhapuram Palace, Thengapattanam, and Tirparappu Waterfalls are nearby tourist spots.

The nearest airport is Trivandrum International Airport. Kuzhithurai Railway Station serves the town. Nagercoil Junction Railway Station is the nearest major railhead. Aruvikkarai can be accessed from Kuzhithurai and Nagercoil by road.
