= Ithiyapuram Kaavu =

Ithiyapuram Kaavu (இத்தியபுரம் காவு) Swamiyarmadam (சுவாமியார்மடம்) Ithiyapuramkaavu
- Village
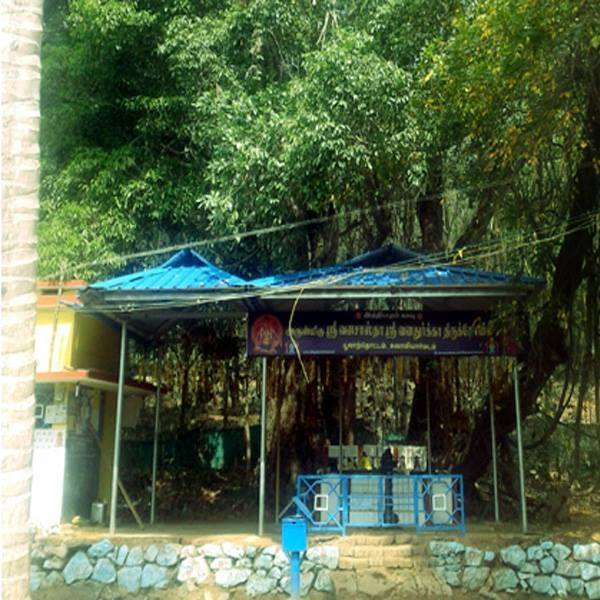
- Nickname: Sasthan kovil
- Location in Tamil Nadu, India
- Coordinates: 8.3076°N 77.221785°E
- Country: India
- State: Tamil Nadu
- District: Kanyakumari

Languages
  - Official: Tamil
  - Spoken: Tamil Malayalam
- Time zone: UTC+5:30 (IST)
- PIN: 629158
- Vehicle registration: TN-75
- Nearest cities: Marthandam, Thuckalay, Thiruvattaru, Nagercoil & Trivandrum
- Lok Sabha constituency: Kanyakumari
- Vidhan Sabha constituency: Padmanabapuram
- Literacy: 100%
- Website: ithiyapuramkaavu.in

Ithiyapuram Kaavu is a Hindu temple in Tamil Nadu, India.

== Geography ==
This temple is situated in the National Highway NH-47 which runs from Kanyakumari to Thiruvananthapuram. It is located about 30 km from Nagercoil and about 52 km from Thiruvananthapuram and is on the Swamiyarmadam-Verkilambi road, near the Kovikal Bridge. Its exact age is unknown.

In this temple, the primary god is Sree Vana Sastha and the prime goddess is Sree Vana Durga. The gods Bala Ganapati, Nagaraja, Naga Yakshi, Naga Kanni, Sree Krishna, Sree Eeshvarakala Boothathaan are also available. In this shrine Sree Vana Sastha, Sree Vana Durga and Bala Ganapathy gods are self-manifested. In this shrine, Goddess Sree Vana Durga is in the state of penance, and God Sree Bala Ganapathy is regaining his original form on his own day by day.

There are golden and white-colored snakes as well as king cobras in the forest at the back of this temple. The large trees that surround the temple is a sign of this temple's existence eons ago. No one is permitted to go into the forest behind the temple.

=== History ===
The 18th-century Travancore king Marthanda Varma ran via this place to save his life and after becoming the King he handed over a copper record of legal documents as a gift to this temple as said by people during his period. There was no one to maintain this temple for a long time and it was lying dilapidated. In the past, this temple was well maintained because of the action taken by the local public and regular workshops are taking place. During every Pankuni Uthram, a festival of five days is grandly celebrated in this temple. In the month of Karthigai Mandala Pooja of 41 days, Powrnami Pooja, and Aayilya Pooja takes place. Each evening, Santhya Pooja is taking place as a Nithya Pooja.

It is believed that Goddess Sree Vana Durga came to the temple from the dense jungle of Pechiparai, in protection to her God Sree Vana Sastha and snakes troops. During every Powrnami Pooja, one could have a darshan of Nager without fail.

== Gallery ==
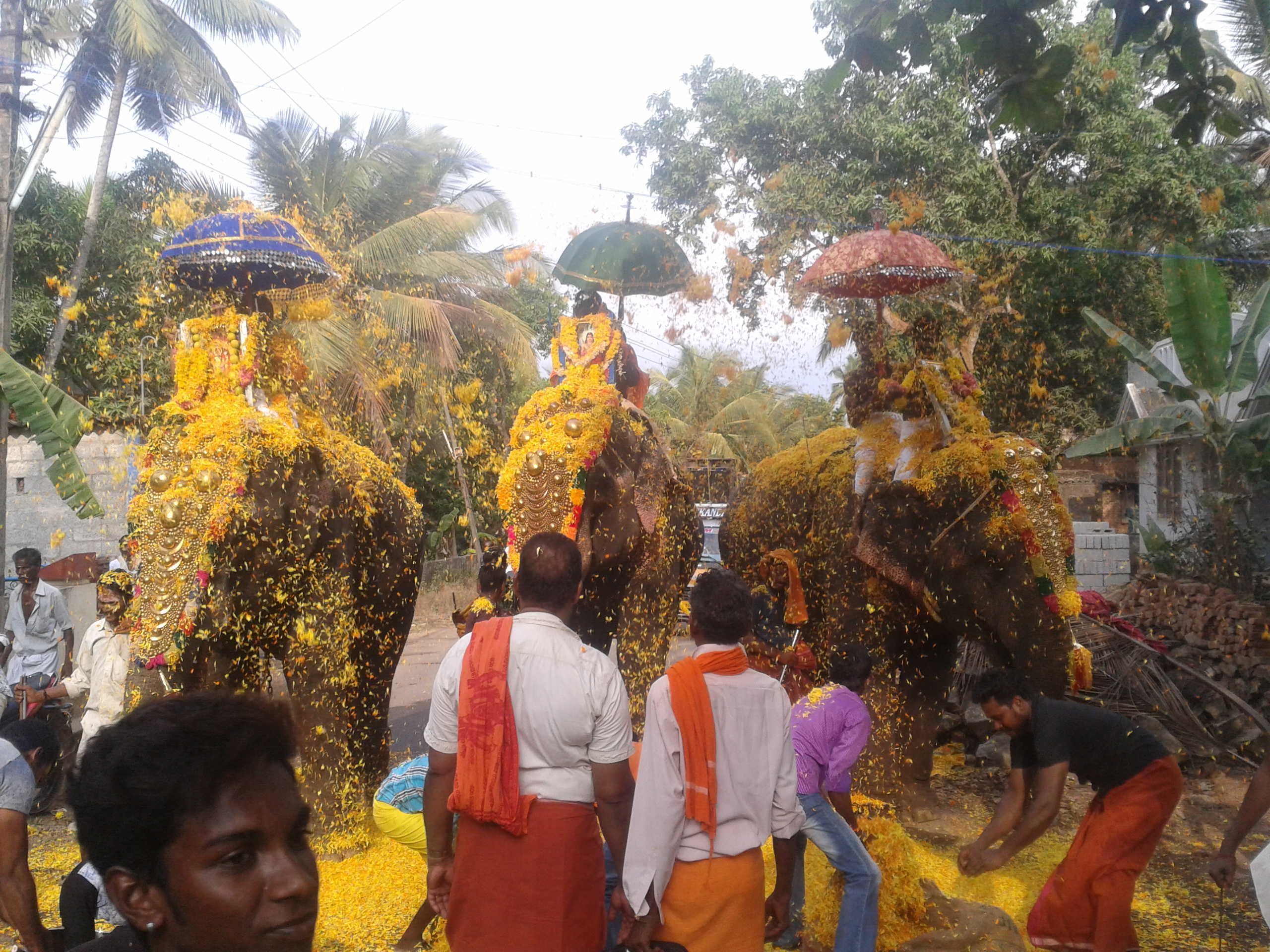
