= Pothigai =

Hills in South India

Agasthiyar malai
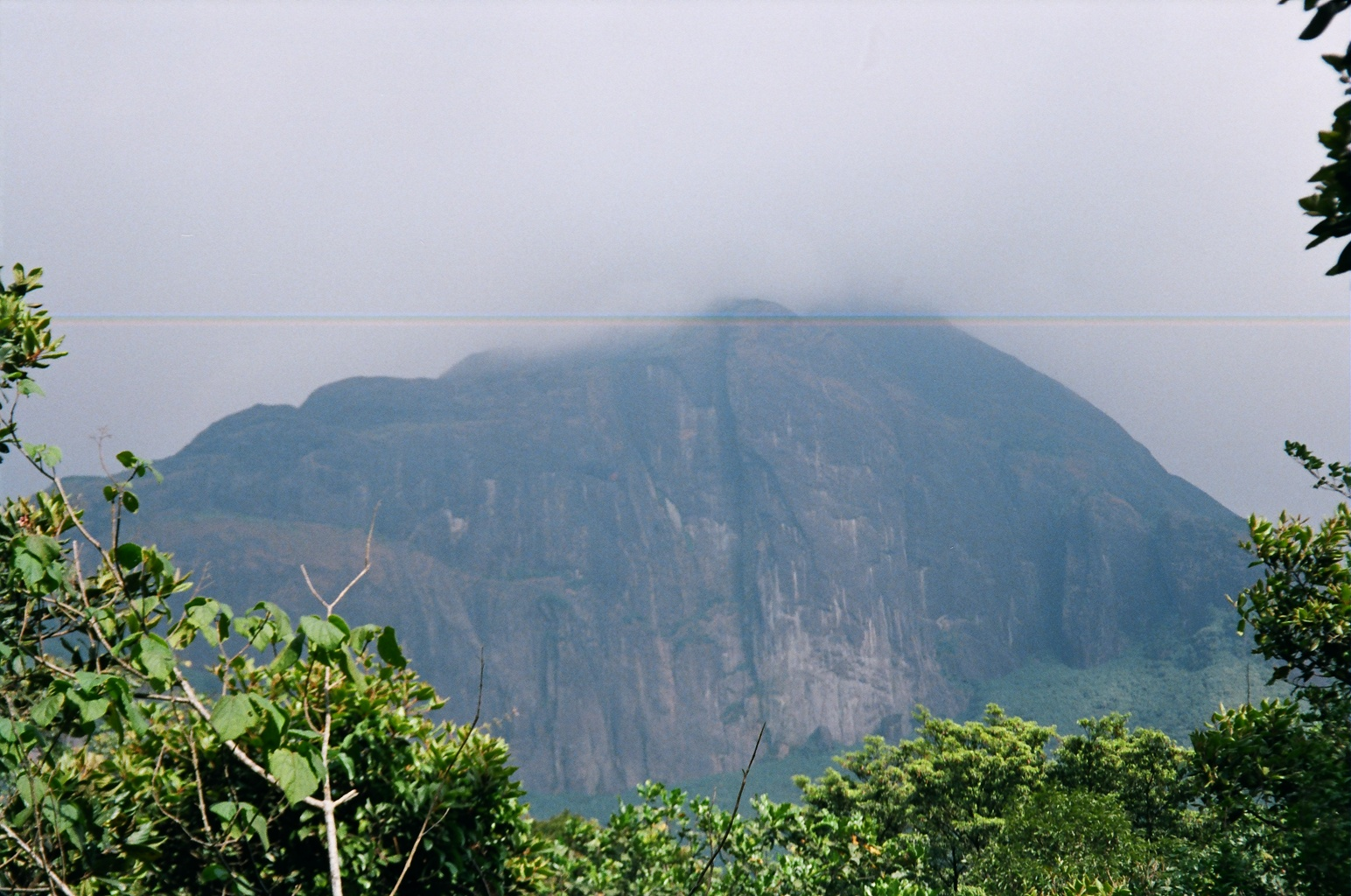
- Agasthiyar malai, the highest of 26 peaks in these hills over 1,600 metres (5,200 ft)

Highest point
- Elevation: 1,868 m (6,129 ft)
- Prominence: 1,668 m (5,472 ft)
- Coordinates: 8°39′N 77°13′E

Naming
- English translation: Mountains of the medicine maker
- Language of name: Tamil

Geography
- Location: Tamil Nadu, India
- Parent range: Western Ghats
- Topo map: Trivandrum Area Map

Geology
- Rock age(s): Cenozoic, 100 to 80 mya
- Mountain type: Fault Description

Climbing
- Easiest route: trekking via Peppara Wildlife Sanctuary

Pothigai Malai
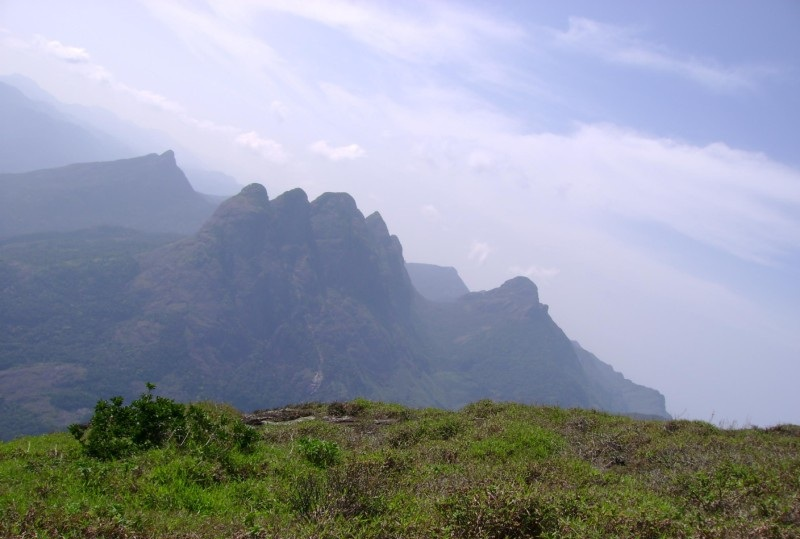

Highest point
- Elevation: 1,866 m (6,122 ft)
- Coordinates: 8°37′00.09″N 77°14′46.50″E

Geography
- Location: Tirunelveli district, Thiruvananthapuram district, Kanyakumari district,Tenkasi district, India
- Parent range: Anaimalai Hills

The Pothigai Hills, also known as Agasthiyar Mountain, is a 1,866-metre (6,122 ft)-tall peak in the southern part of the Western Ghats or Sahyadri of South India. The peak lies in Tirunelveli District of Tamil Nadu.

The area contains several important natural habitats for in-situ conservation of biological diversity, including forests containing threatened species of significant value to science and conservation.

== Geography ==
The western slope is located in the Thiruvananthapuram district of Kerala state, eastern slope of Pothigai hills is in the Tirunelveli district, southern slope is located in Kanyakumari district of Tamil Nadu. At 1,866 meters, it is the highest peak in the rugged Ashambu hills, which have one of the richest concentrations of biodiversity in the Western Ghats. The area is known for its extensive views, forests, waterfalls, ancient temples, and the river Thamirabarani, the lifeline of the region.

== Environment ==
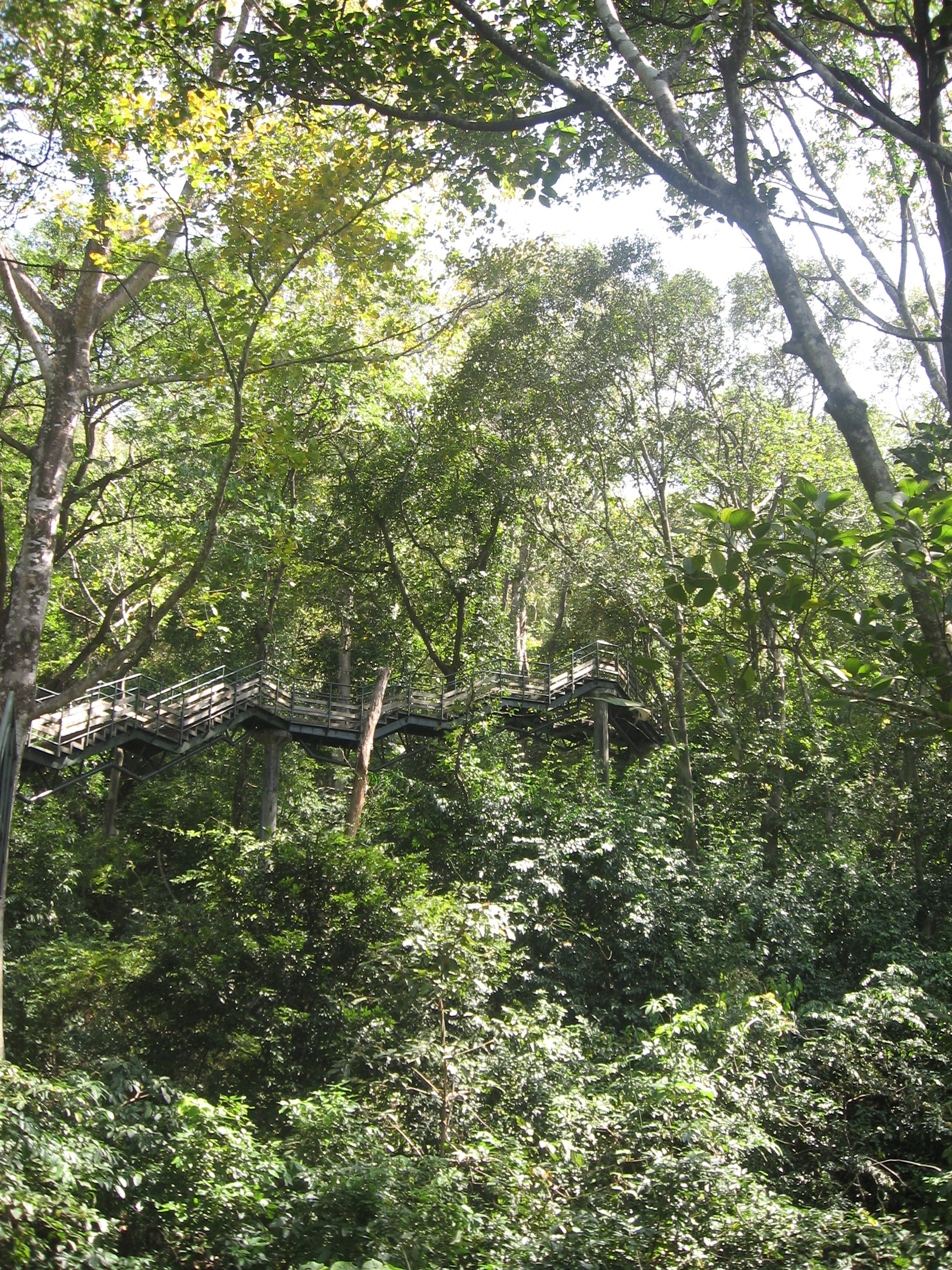
Thenmala Adventure Zone

Agastyamalai is home to the Kanikkaran people, one of the oldest surviving hunter-gatherer tribes in the world.

The Agasthiyar malai include the Indian Ecoregions of South Western Ghats moist deciduous forests above 500 metres (1,600 ft), South Western Ghats montane rain forests above 1,000 metres (3,300 ft) and shola-grasslands complex on peaks above 1,600 metres (5,200 ft).

These hills are noted as the habitat for at least 2,000 species of medicinal plants, of which at least 50 are rare and endangered species. There are also wild relatives of jackfruit, mango, cardamom, turmeric and banana.

Endangered mammals here include the Bengal tiger, Indian elephant, lion-tailed macaques, Nilgiri tahr and the vulnerable gaur, sloth bear, Malabar spiny dormouse and Nilgiri marten. There are also Jerdon's palm civet, gray slender loris, great pied hornbills and king cobras. Ecotourism is popular in the area.

== History ==
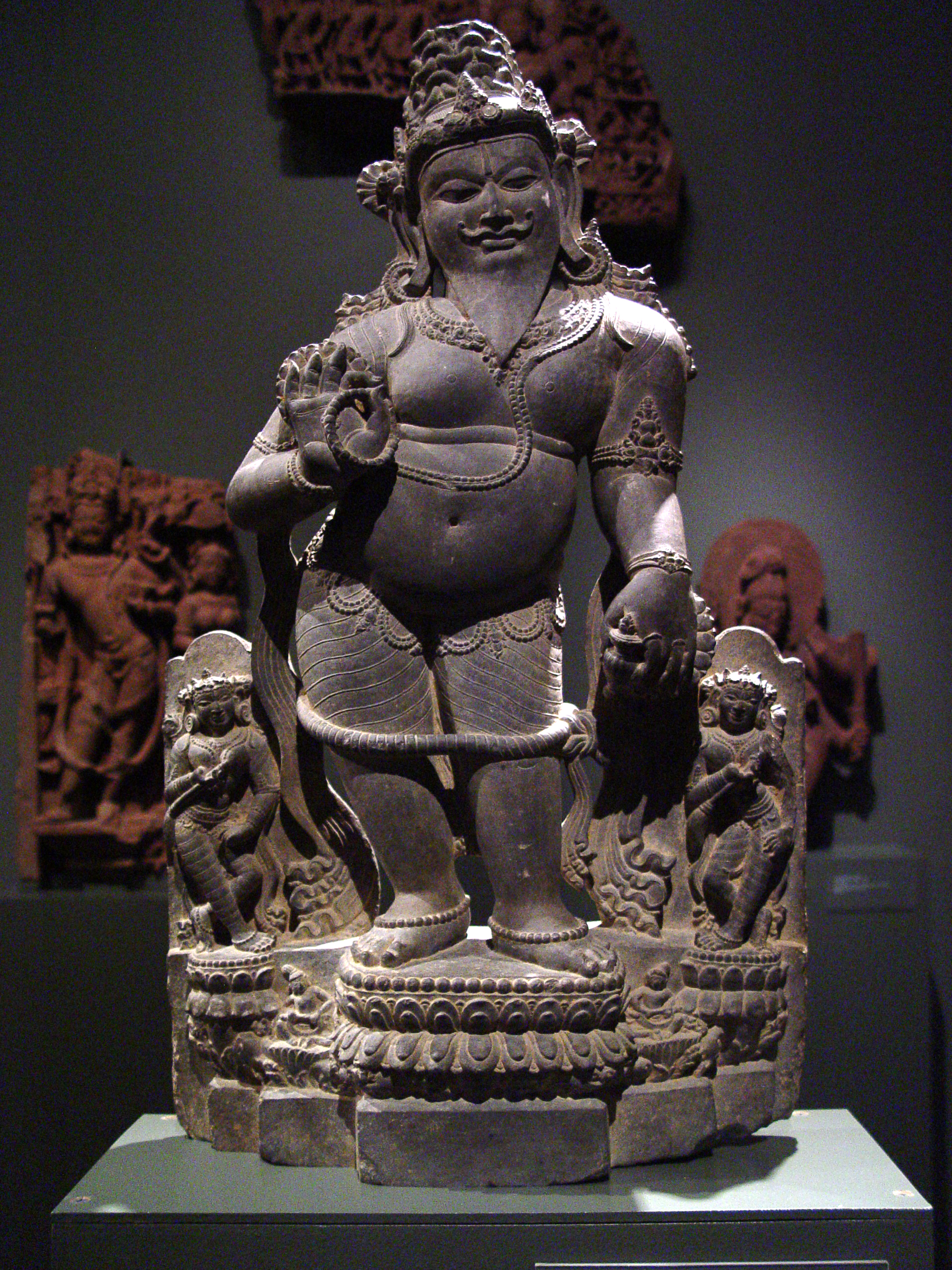
Statue of Agastya, 12th century CE. Shrines of Agastya, chairman of the first Tamil Sangam in Madurai Pandya kingdom, are worshipped at the Tamraparni river's source and in Sri Lanka, ancient Tamraparni

The Pothigai hills are mentioned as Potiyil, Potiyal, Pothikai and Potalaka in historical sources largely in relation to the river Tamraparni and the ancient Sage Agastya (Akattiyan).

The Egyptian Greek cartographer Ptolemy names the mountain "Bettigo", from where three rivers rise, including Solen (Tamraparni River), meaning chank - the river was famous for its pearl fishing.

At the mountains, Tamil was created by Agastya, according to Kamban and Villiputturar, while Kancipuranam and Tiruvilaiyatarpuranam assert Shiva taught Agastya Tamil. Tamil Hindu tradition holds that Shiva and Murugan taught Agastya the Tamil language, who then constructed a Tamil grammar, at Pothigai mountains. According to the Tambraparni Mahatmyam, an ancient account of the river from its rise to its mouth, a string of red lotus flowers from sage Agastya at Agastya Malai, Pothigai hills, transformed itself into a damsel at the sight of Shiva, forming the river at the source and giving it its divine name, Tamraparni. The shrine to Agastiyar at the Pothigai hill source of the Tamraparni river is mentioned in both Ilango Adigal's Cilappatikaram and Chithalai Chathanar's Manimekalai epics, in relation to blessings sought by Sugriva and his army from the Ramayana.

Peraciriyar states that Agastiyar taught this grammar to Tolkappiyar, one of his twelve disciples, at Pothigai hills, who then wrote Tolkāppiyam, although mentions that some scholars believe Tolkappiyar based the Tamil grammar on other forms no longer extant; Agastiyar is not mentioned in Tolkāppiyam. Paripāṭal of the Eṭṭuttokai anthology speaks of "vaynta Potiyin munivan", the famous sage of Poti". In Naccinarkiniyar's commentaries, quoting lines of Nakkiranar, Agastiyar is associated with the Pothigai mountains and pure Tamil. In Sundarar's Tevaram, the Pothigai mountains are mentioned.

Following the establishment of Siddhar Gnana Koodam, and traveling the world to spread his knowledge, Agastya returned to Agastya Mala, the point on the Pothigai hills where he merged into the cosmos. A temple dedicated to him is built here, close to the Papanasam Falls, on the banks of the Thamirabarani River. Pilgrims believe Sage Agastya gives appearances to sincere aspirants and devotees.

Tamil Buddhist tradition developed in Chola literature, such as in Buddamitra's Virasoliyam , states Agastya learnt Tamil from the Bodhisattva Avalokiteshvara; the earlier Chinese traveler Xuanzang recorded the existence of a temple dedicated to Avalokiteshvara in the South Indian hill Potala. A Buddhist text, Tarasukkam, refers to Avalokitesvara as "Potalagirinivasini". The author of the Cilappatikaram, utilizing the word "Potiyil" for the hills, hails the southern breeze that emanates from the hills that blows over the kingdom of the Pandyas of Madurai and Korkai that own it. Chithalai Chathanar's Manimekhalai describes a river flowing on the slope of Potiyil mountain where the Buddhist monks observed meditation. The author utilized the word "Potiyil" for Buddhist pallis. In fellow Sangam work Kuṟuntokai of the Eṭṭuttokai anthology, a Buddhist vihara under a Banyan tree is described at the top of the mountain. A comment that God had disappeared from the mountain was found in Ahananuru, from whose inaccessible top the stream of clear waters flows down with noise in torrents, and the fact that old men assembled and played dice in the dilapidated temple is described in Purananuru.

The Japanese scholar Shu Hikosaka on the basis of his study of Buddhist scriptures, ancient Tamil literature, as well as field survey, proposes the hypothesis that, the ancient mount Potalaka, the residence of Avalokiteśvara described in the Gaṇḍavyūha Sūtra and Xuanzang’s Records, is the real mountain Pothigai (or Potiyil) situated at Ambasamudram in Tirunelveli district, Tamil Nadu. Shu also says that mount Potiyil/Potalaka has been a sacred place for the people of South India from time immemorial. With the spread of Buddhism in the region beginning at the time of the king Aśoka in the third century B.C.E., it became a holy place also for Buddhists who gradually became dominant as a number of their hermits settled there. The local people, though, mainly remained followers of the Hindu religion. The mixed Hindu-Buddhist cult culminated in the formation of the figure of Avalokiteśvara.

== Protected areas ==
The southern side of the hills in Tamil Nadu includes Kanyakumari Wildlife Sanctuary a 402.4 square kilometres (155.4 sq mi) protected area in Kanyakumari district, Tamil Nadu. The eastern side of the hills in Tamil Nadu includes the Kalakkad Mundanthurai Tiger Reserve (KMTR), a 895 square kilometres (346 sq mi) protected area. The Kerala side of the hills hosts the 128 square kilometres (49 sq mi) Neyyar Wildlife Sanctuary, the 53 square kilometres (20 sq mi) Peppara Wildlife Sanctuary, the 171 square kilometres (66 sq mi) Shenduruny Wildlife Sanctuary and the Kulathupuzha and Palode Reserve forests near Courtallam. The Naraikadu forest or "grey jungle", surrounded by the Kalakad Mundanthurai Tiger Reserve, is privately owned by the Dhonavur Fellowship. This community has restored and protected the area so well that it is one of the best preserved forest tracts in the whole Ashambu Hills.

These protected areas in the Agasthyamala Hills comprise the Agasthyamalai Biosphere Reserve (ABR). This reserve includes 3,500.36 km^{2} (1,351.50 sq mi) out of which 1,828 square kilometres (706 sq mi) is in Kerala and 1,672.36 square kilometres (645.70 sq mi) is in Tamil Nadu.

The Western Ghats, Agasthyamalai Sub-Cluster, including all of Agasthyamalai Biosphere Reserve, included in Man and the Biosphere(MAB) programme by the UNESCO World Heritage Committee that concluded in Peru on 19 March 2016.

== Tourism ==
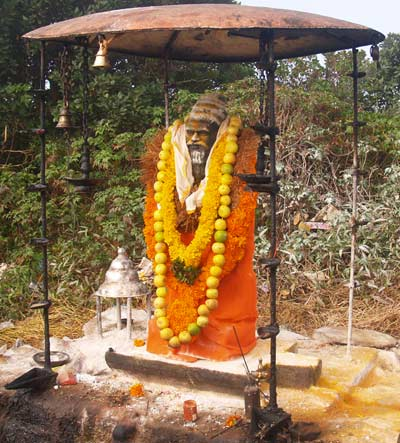
Agasthya Murti at the top of Agasthyamalai Peak

There are several Hindu Temples and seasonal waterfalls which are tourist attractions in these hills. At Suruli Falls there is a 2-stage Cascading water fall The Suruli River supplying the falls originates from the Meghamalai Hills. The falls drop from a height of 150 feet (46 m) collect into a pool, flow for a short distance and again plummet an additional 40 feet (12 m). Near the falls are 18 caves some of which represent Indian rock-cut architecture temples of the 18th Century. This tourist and pilgrimage destination is easily reached by road 56 km (35 mi) from Theni and 10 km (6.2 mi) from Cumbum in the Theni District.

Many pilgrims climb Agasthyamalai in the core of the hills to perform a puja ceremony at the Agasthya Murti on the top the Peak. Most pilgrims use the well-worn path through Peppara Wildlife Sanctuary on the Kerala side. The trekkers start from Bonaccord estate in Thiruvananthapuram district with a guide from the Forest Department. The first night is spent at a camp facility set up by the department in the middle of the forests. Trekkers reach the peak the next day and return to the camp the same day. Only 100 pilgrims per day are allowed on this route during the January February season.

Visitors must obtain an entry pass from the Trivandrum Forest Headquarters or through Online booking against payment of Rs 1000. The Chief Conservator is responsible for on-site management of the protected areas on the Kerala side of the Hills.

== Gallery ==
Views of the Agasthyamalai Hills

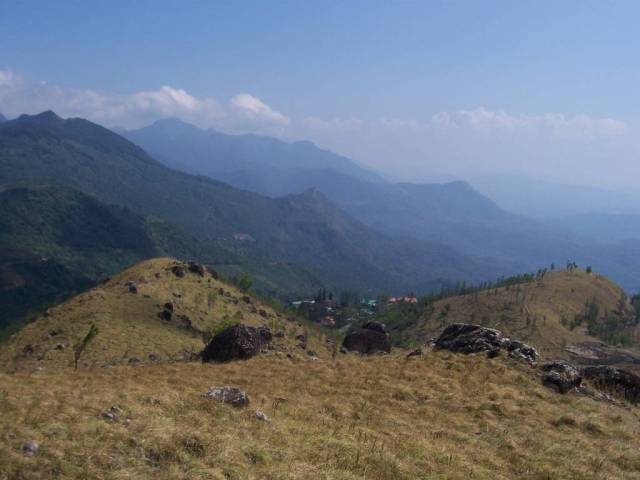
Hills at Ponmudi

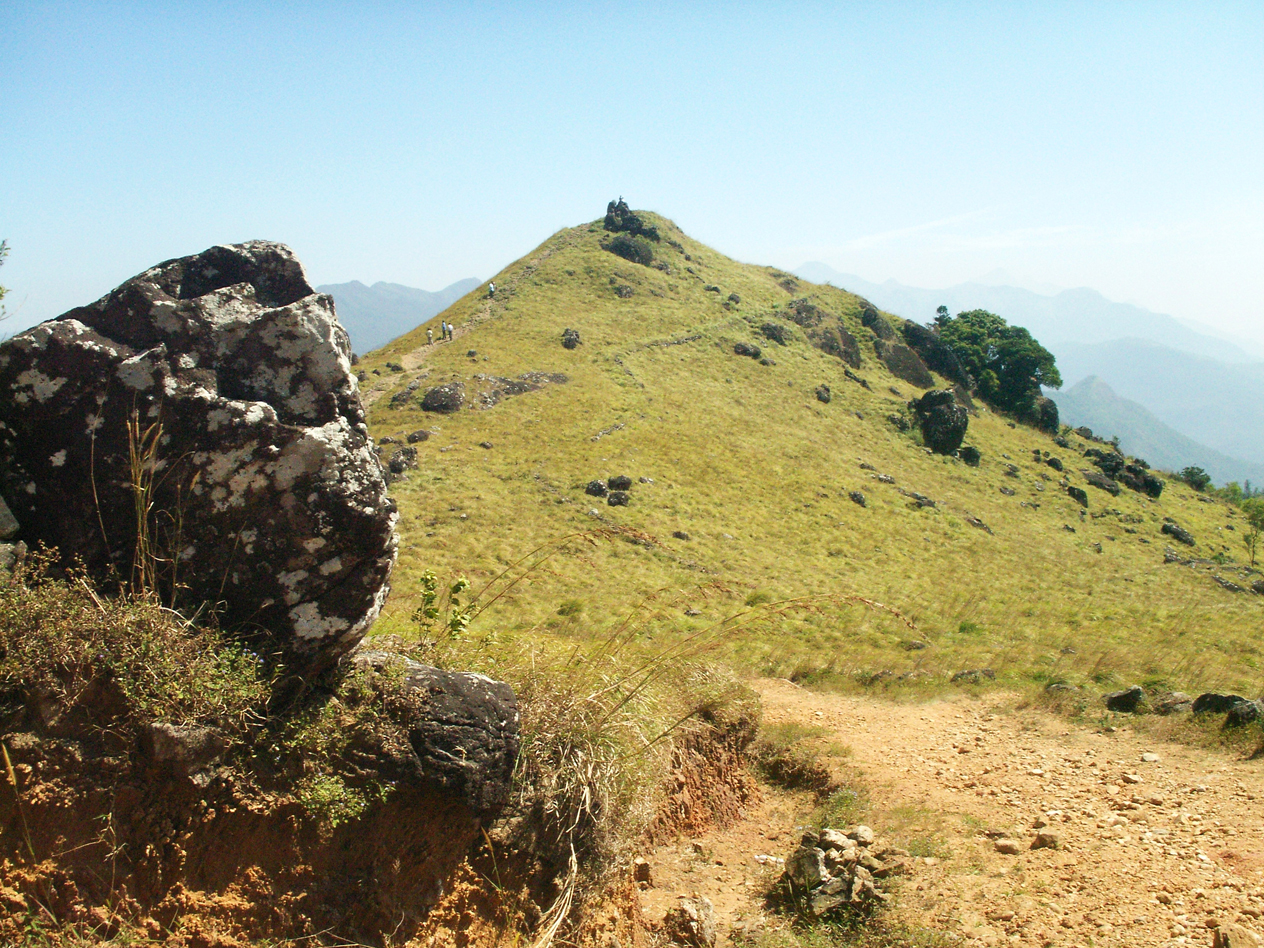
Ponmudi Peak

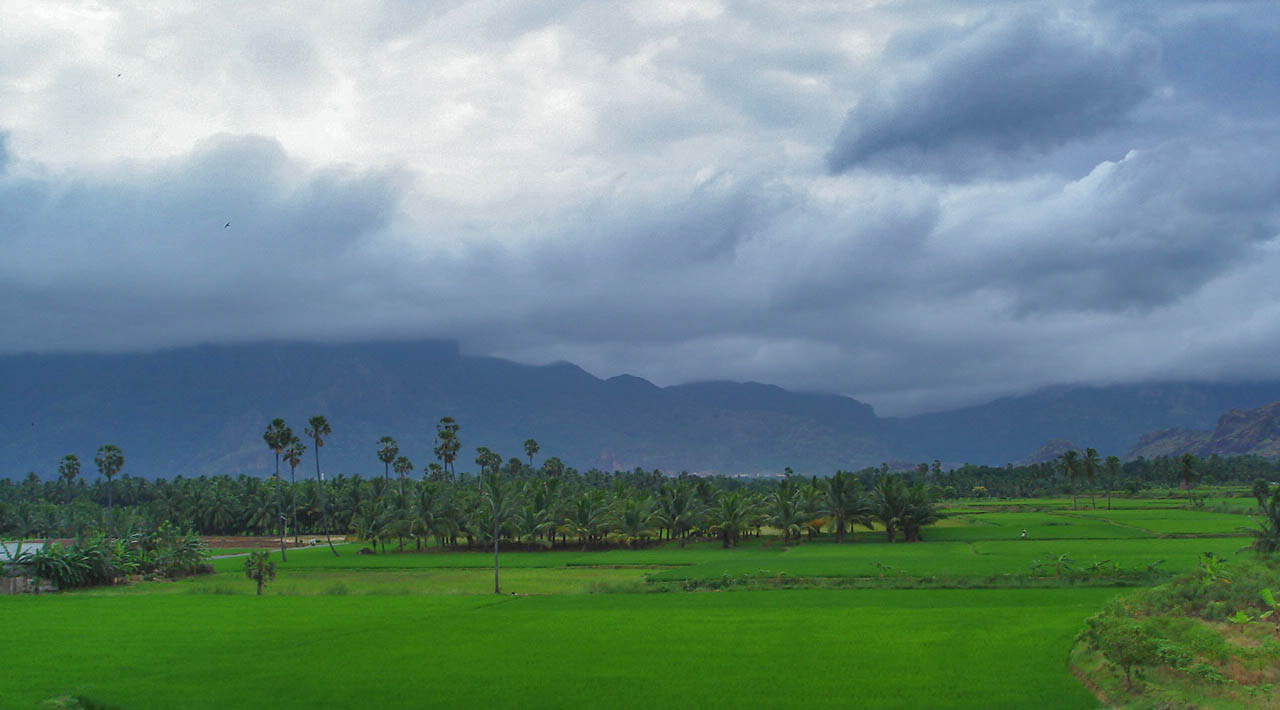
Hills from Nagercoil

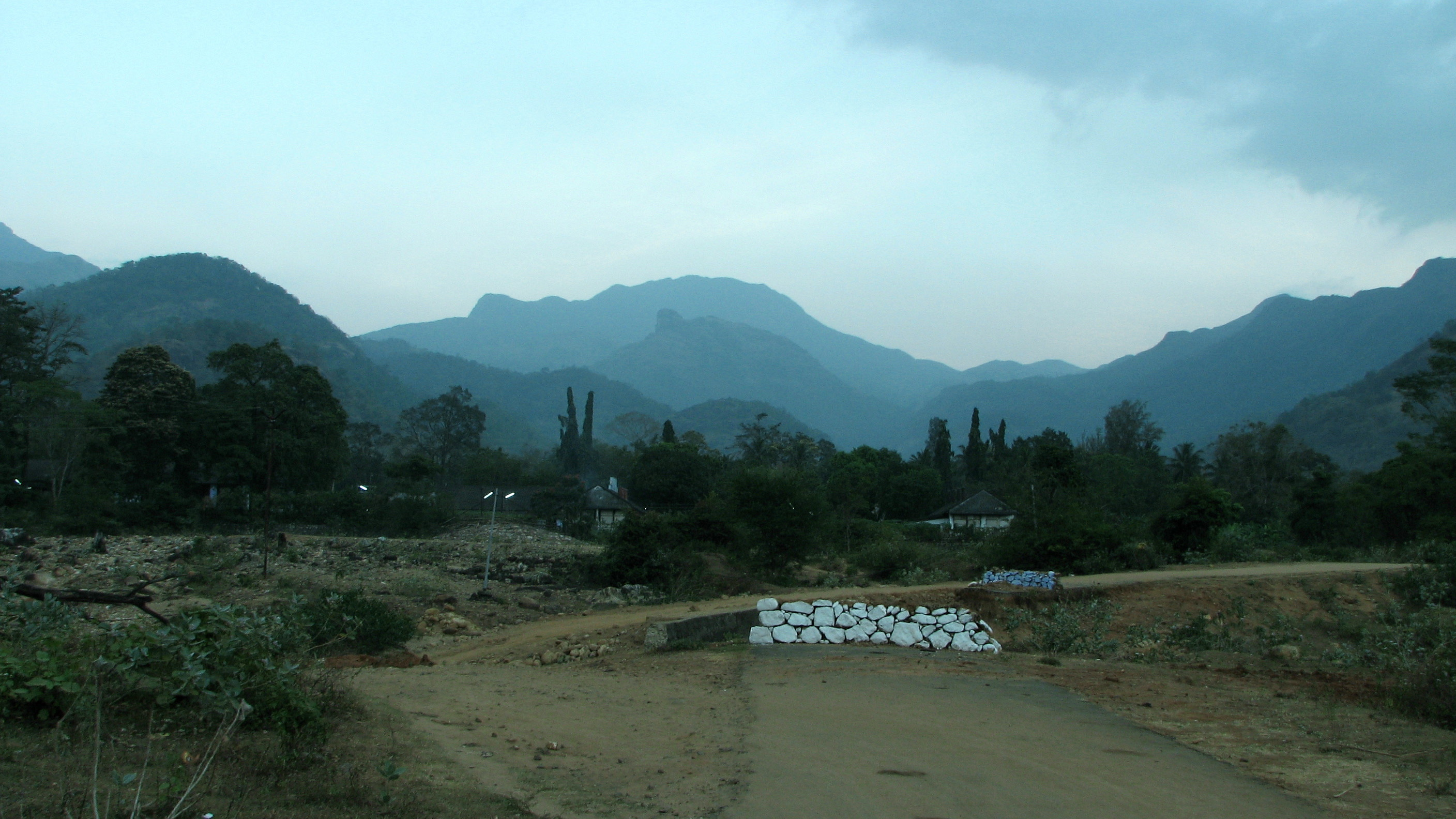
Hills from Keeriparai Reserve Forest

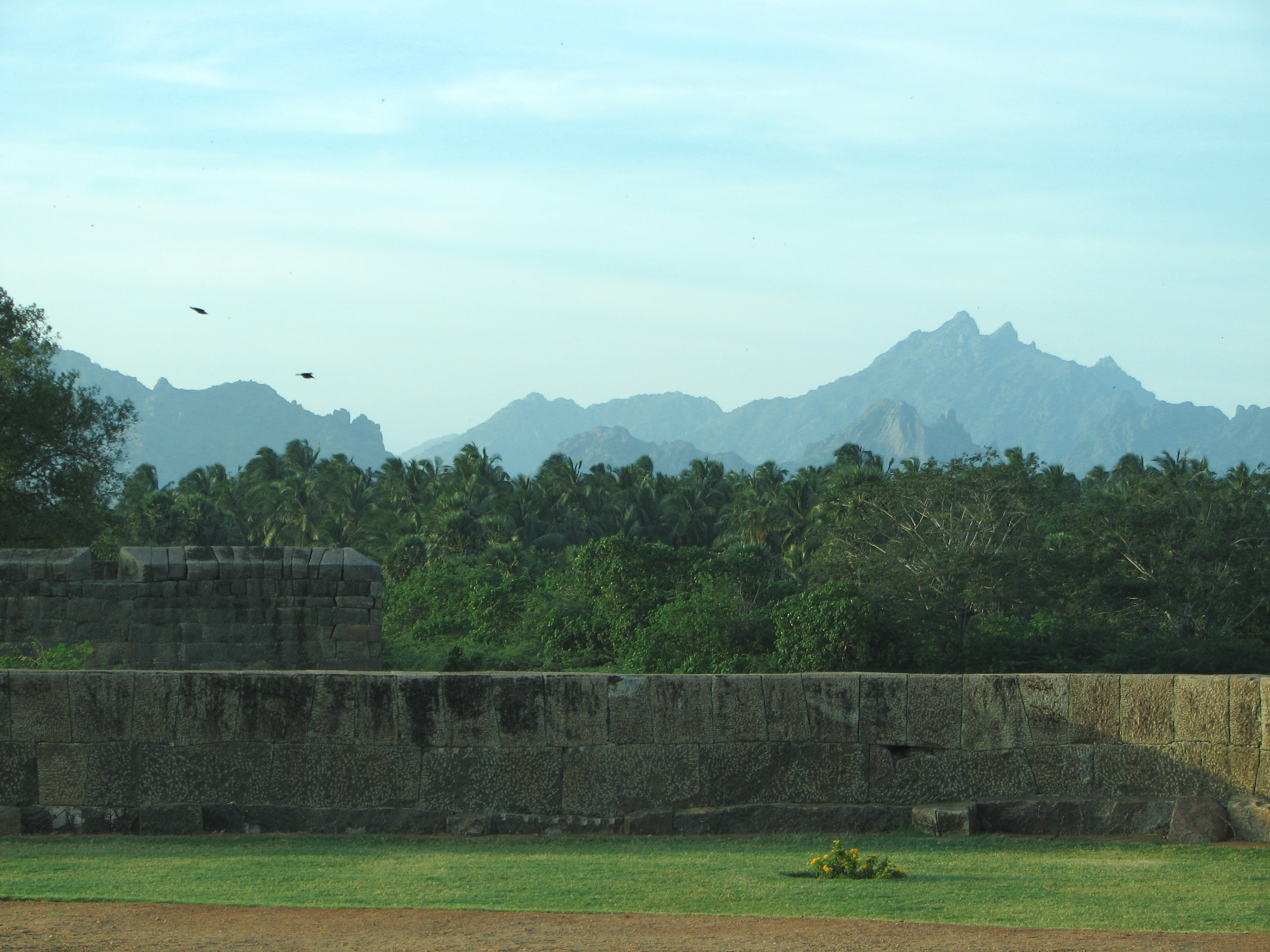
Hills from Vattakottai Fort

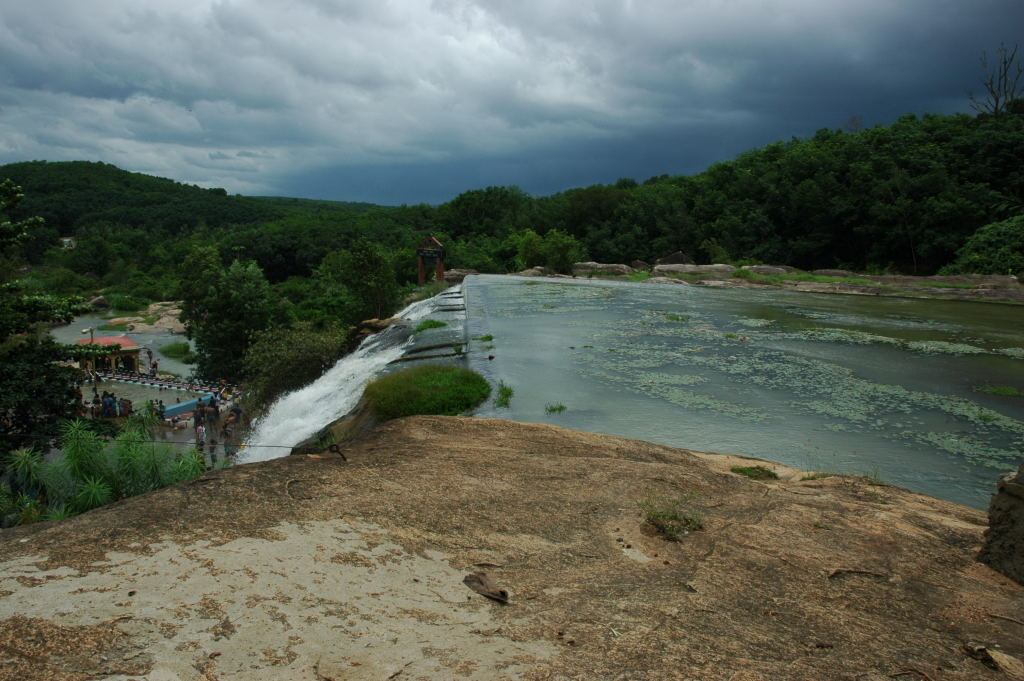
top of Tirparappu Waterfalls

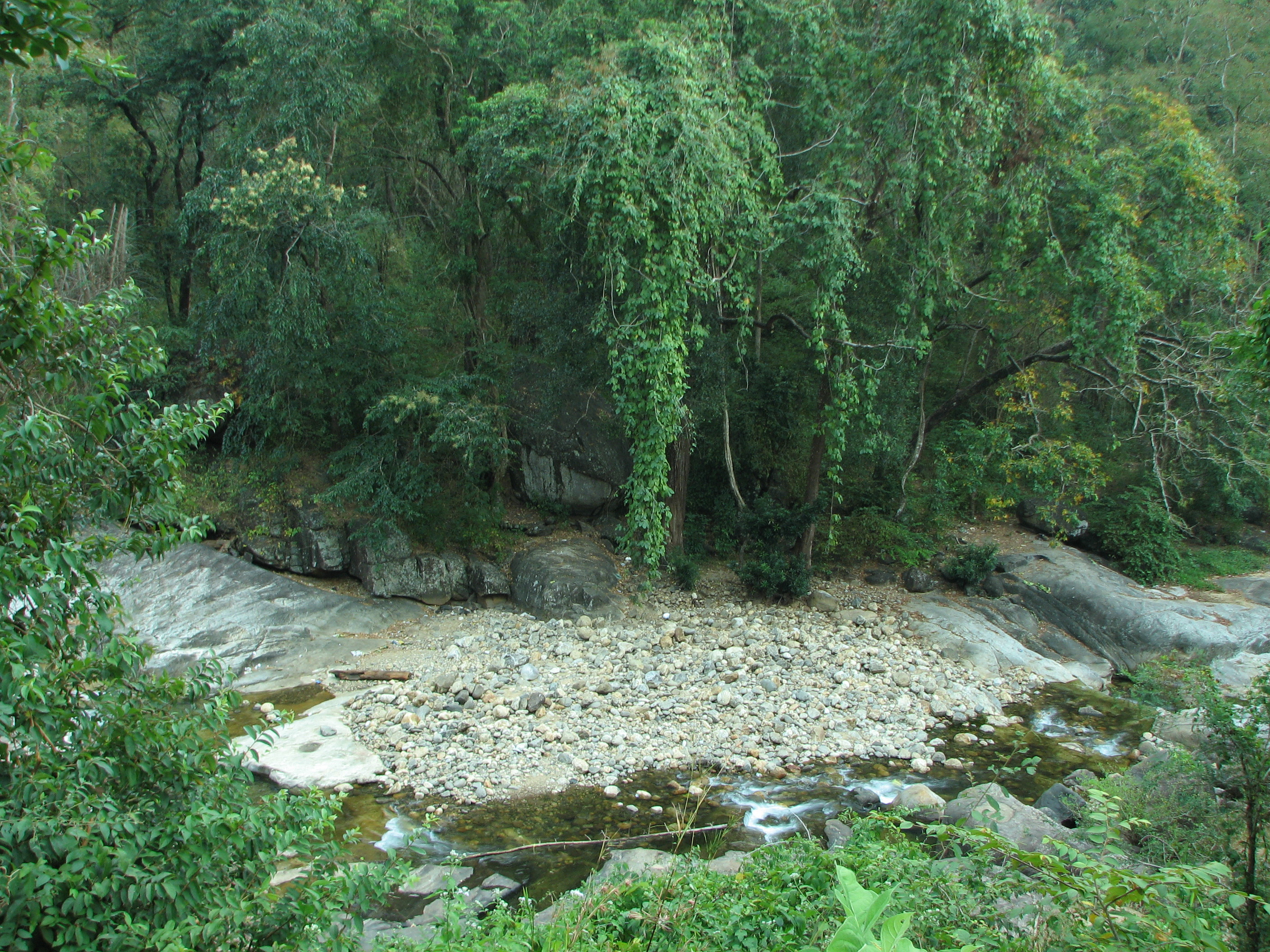
Stream in Keeriparai Reserve Forest

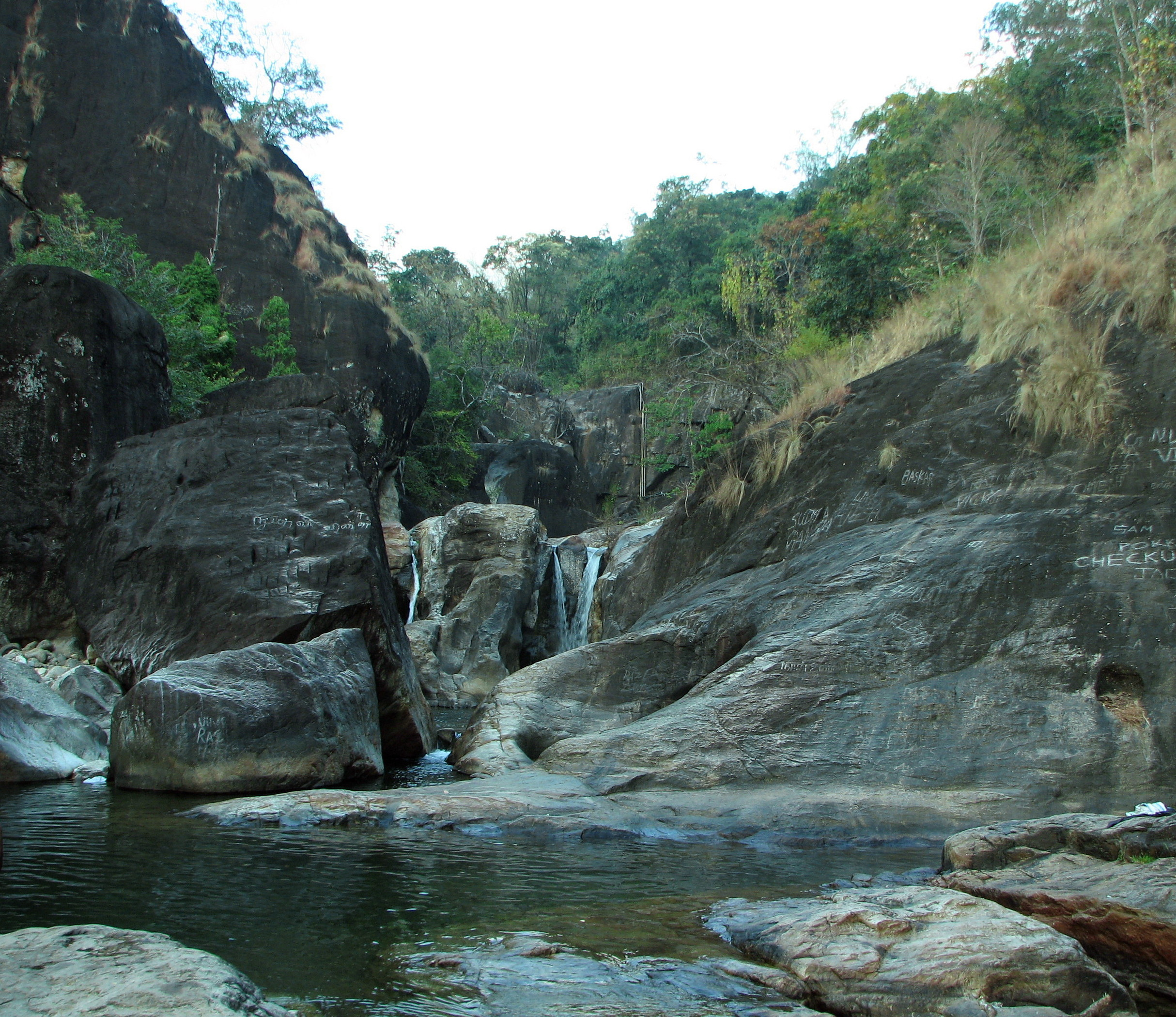
Vattaparai Falls in dry season

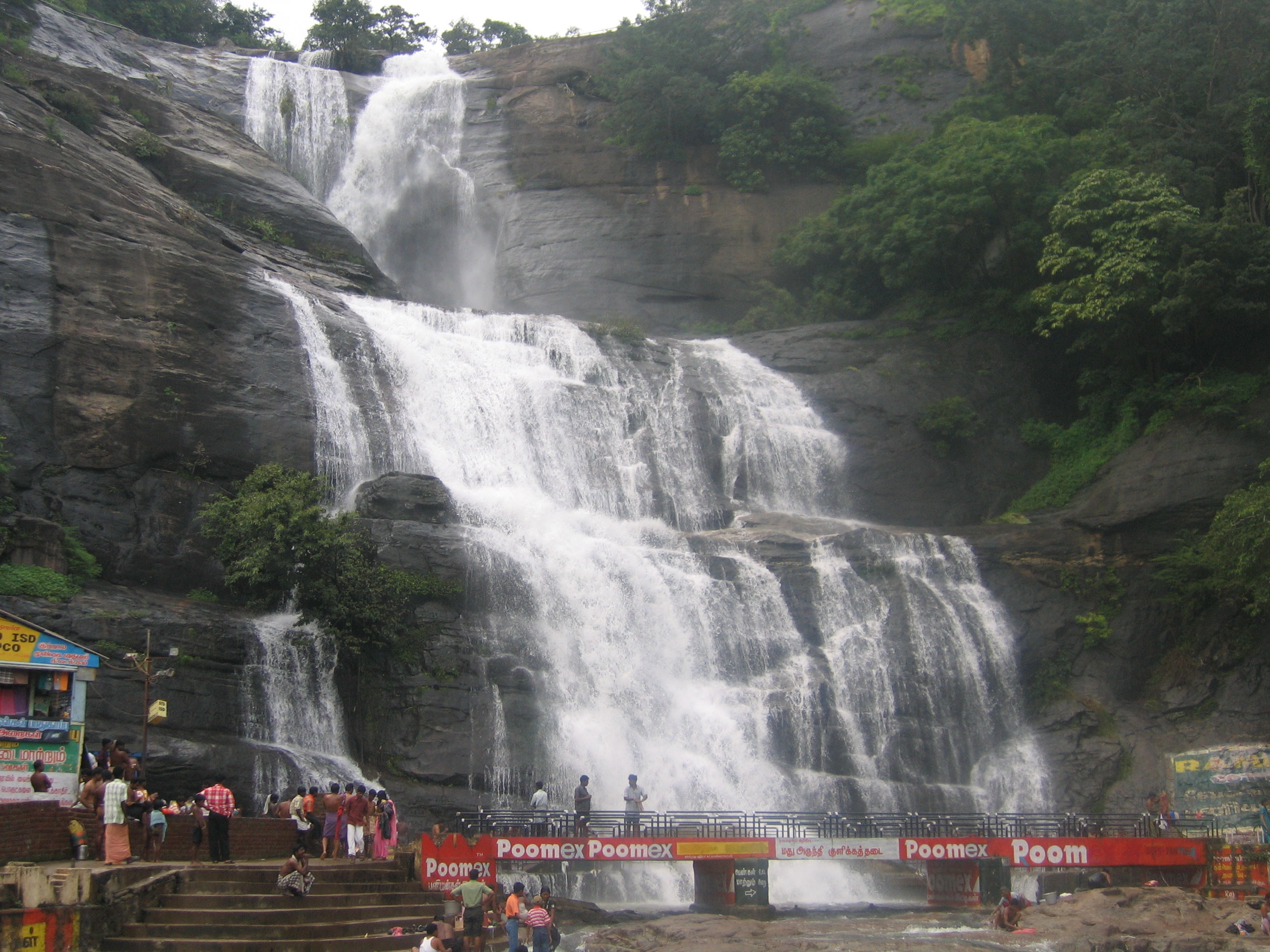
Courtallam Waterfalls
