= Kulasekaram =

Neighbourhood in Kanyakumari district, Tamil Nadu, India

Kulasekharam
- Town
- Location in Tamil Nadu, India
- Coordinates: 8.3667°N 77.3°E
- Country: India
- State: Tamil Nadu
- District: Kanyakumari
- Elevation: 280 m (920 ft)

Population (2011)
  - Total: 17,267

Languages
  - Official: Tamil
  - Spoken: Tamil Malayalam
- Time zone: UTC+5:30 (IST)
- PIN: 629161
- Telephone code: 91-4651
- Vehicle registration: TN-75
- Sex ratio: 1000:1018 ♂/♀
- Literacy: 90.71%
- Lok Sabha constituency: Kanniyakumari
- Vidhan Sabha constituency: Padmanabhapuram
- Climate: Moderate (Köppen)

Kulasekharam is a town located in the district of Kanyakumari, Tamil Nadu, India. It is one of the most important business centres in the district, after Marthandam.

Kulasekharam has many rubber plantations that yield high quality latex, which is one of the town's major revenue source. The town has made significant contributions in the field of healthcare by providing medical facilities to the semi-rural population of nearby areas. Kulasekharam has a mix of Hindu, Christian, and Muslim communities and has historically been a peaceful town. Malayalees and Tamilians form the majority of the population.

== Etymology ==
Kulasekhara is the name of a dynasty that ruled over Kerala, from which the name may have been derived. Kulasekharam and its surrounding areas have a rich royal heritage and were once part of the Travancore kingdom.

== Administration ==
Kulasekharam is a town panchayat located in Kanyakumari district, and comes under Thiruvattar taluk. It has 18 wards in the panchayat. The elected Councilors are responsible for the development of their wards. Drainage facilities, local roads, and water facilities are maintained by them.

=== Police station ===
The Kulasekharam Police station is located at Arasumoodu.

=== Fire control ===
The Fire Control Station is located in Eanchacode.

== Tourism ==
Although Kulasekharam is named for its scenic views, it doesn't have any important tourist spots within the town limits. However, it serves as a key place to reach various tourist destinations in Kanyakumari district, such as Thirparappu, Mathur Aqueduct, Pechiparai Reservoir, Perunchani Dam, and Kothayar. The Thirparappu waterfalls and Pechiparai Dam are the main tourist attractions in the district. Kothayar has a hydroelectric power plant located in a dense forest area. In addition, it has one more nature-viewed place called Kalikesam, with waterfalls, rocks, and a historical temple.

== Education ==
Kulasekharam is home to several higher educational institutions, including medical, nursing, dental, and agricultural colleges.

=== Medical colleges ===
- Sree Mookaambika Institute of Medical Sciences (SMIMS)
- Sree Ramakrishna Medical College of Naturopathy and Yogic Sciences
- Sarada Krishna Homeopathic Medical College

=== Nursing colleges ===
- Sree Mookambika College of Nursing (SMCON)
- Sree Ramakrishna College of Nursing

=== Dental colleges ===
- Sree Mookambika Institute of Dental Sciences

=== Arts and science ===
- Sri Ramakrishna College of Education

=== Polytechnic college ===
- BWDA Polytechnic College, Vendalicode

=== Agricultural college ===
- TNAU Institute of Horticulture Research Station

Several private educational institutions in Kulasekharam also offer education in various fields.

== Location and significance ==
Kulasekharam is located approximately 50 km south of the Trivandrum Metropolitan Region and about 30 km from Nagercoil, the nearest major city. It is situated around 12 km from the commercial town of Marthandam, 18 km from Thuckalay and Kaliyakkavilai, and 22 km from Monday Market. Due to its proximity to Trivandrum, the capital of Kerala, the younger population of Kulasekharam either commutes to or has migrated to the city. Kulasekharam is connected to Trivandrum by National Highway 66 and the Vizhinjam Harbour–Beach Road. Additionally, the Hill Road which runs through Nedumangadu is used by commuters, particularly during peak hours when traffic congestion is heavy on the main routes.

== Demographics ==
As of 2011 India census, Kulasekharam had a population of 17,267. Males constitute 49.5% of the population and females 50.5%. Kulasekharam has an average literacy rate of 90%, higher than the state average of 80.09%: male literacy is 92.54%, and female literacy is 88.91%. In Kulasekharam, 9.39% of the population is under 6 years of age. The majority of the population belongs to the Nair and Nadar communities. Other communities present in the town include Ezhava (Panikker), Viswakarma, Vannan, and Paraya.

== Medical facilities ==
Kulasekharam has one government hospital, three medical college hospitals and more than 15 hospitals, which serve people in almost all kind of treatments. There is also a government veterinary hospital located within Kulasekharam. People also do visit medical facilities available in Nagercoil, Marthandam and Trivandrum in which it includes Trivandrum Medical College, General Hospital, Thar Salvation Army Catherine Booth Hospital (CBH), KIMS, NIMS, Ananthapuri, Cosmopolitan Hospital, PRS, Lord's Hospital, Aster Medicity, etc. The town is also home to Saradha Krishna Homeopathy Medical College which has a 100-bed hospital.

== Shopping ==
Kulasekharam Market is one of the important shopping centres for Kulasekharam and the nearby towns. Some 8000-10000 people gather there daily to buy their basic needs.

== Climate ==
Kulasekharam has a pleasant, though humid, climate for a majority of the year. The maximum temperature during the summer hovers around 86 °F (30 °C) or 30 °C, with extremely high humidity at times. Kulasekharam receives both the north-east monsoon and the south-west monsoon. It rains more often in Kanyakumari district than in any other part of Tamil Nadu, with the exception of Chennai.

== Culture and Religion ==
Both Malayalam and Tamil are widely spoken in Kulasekharam. Tamil, along with English, is used as the medium of instruction in most schools. The local dialect of Tamil spoken in the region incorporates elements of Malayalam, sometimes unintelligible to the people of North Tamil Nadu.

The culture reflects a blend of Tamil and Malayalam traditions. Hinduism, Christianity, and Islam are the major religions practiced in the town. The region has a notable population of the Nair community, and several temples in and around Kulasekharam are traditionally managed by Nair families. The Nadar community also constitutes a significant portion of the population. Various communities in Kulasekharam coexist harmoniously, contributing to the town’s diverse cultural fabric.

Local cuisine reflects influences from both Tamil Nadu and Kerala. Common food items include Idli, Dosa, Puttu, Appam, and Idiappam. Curries are typically prepared using coconut and coconut oil, characteristic of Kerala-style cooking.

== Festivals ==
Some of the festivals celebrated in Kulasekharam include Onam, Vishu, Diwali, Pongal, Christmas, Easter, New Year’s Day, Ganesh Chaturthi (Vinayaka Chaturthi), Krishna Janmashtami (Krishna Jayanti), Navaratri, Karthikai Deepam, Karkidaka Vavu, Sivalaya Ottam, Pradosham, Vaikunta Ekadashi, Aayilyam, Ramzan (Eid al-Fitr), and Bakrid (Eid al-Adha).

== Transport ==
=== Road ===
Road transport is the primary means of transportation in Kulasekharam. SH90 and SH45 pass through the town, connecting it with nearby major centres such as Aralvaimozhi and Marthandam. The SETC operates a daily bus service to Chennai at 3:00 pm. Kulasekharam has road connectivity to important cities and towns including Nagercoil, Kanniyakumari, Nedumangadu, Coimbatore, Madurai, Tirunelveli, Thiruchendur, Thoothukudi, and Chennai. The Kulasekharam bus stand is located at Thumbacode, from where government and private buses operate to various destinations, serving the commuting needs of the local population. Auto-rickshaws, private cars, vans, and minibuses are also used for local transportation.

=== Train ===
The nearest railway station to Kulasekharam is Kuzhithurai (KZT), situated approximately 10 km away. Several passenger and express trains operate from Kuzhithurai to destinations such as Thiruvananthapuram, Nagercoil, Chennai, Madurai, and Mumbai. For long-distance trains that do not halt at Kuzhithurai, passengers generally travel to Nagercoil Junction (NCJ) or Thiruvananthapuram Central (TVC).

=== Air ===
Kulasekharam is served by Trivandrum International Airport which is approximately 45 km away. Kulasekharam Town is only 16 km away from the southern border of Trivandrum Metropolitan Region and hence considered one of its suburbs even though it lies across the state border.

== Communication ==
=== Telecommunication ===
State owned BSNL is offering land line, mobile, wireless and wired internet facility. Private telecom operators include Airtel, Vi and Jio. Airtel is offering their 3G services in Kulasekharam from September 2011 & BSNL 3G from November 2013, Vodafone 3G and Aircel 3G (not in operation) has launched around May 2015. All major operators, including BSNL, Airtel, Vi, and Jio, provide 4G services in the town, while Airtel and Jio have also rolled out 5G services.

=== Postal ===
Kulasekharam head post office is in Arasumoodu Jn. Various services like postal, speed post, parcel service, and banking service are also offered here. The Postal Index Number for Kulasekharam post office is 629161.

== Religious Institutions ==
- Ittakaveli Mudippura Sri Neelakeshi Amman Temple, Kulasekharam
- Kulasekharam Chembakappara Sri Balabbhadra Devi Temple, Kavuvilai, Cheruppalur
- Manalivila Sri Bhadrakali Devi Temple, Kulasekharam
- St. Augustine's Church, Kulasekharam
- Mohaideen Masjid, Kavalsthalam, Kulasekharam
- C.S.I District Church, Kulasekharam
