= List of Shiva shrines in Kanyakumari district =

The Sivalayams are 12 Saivite shrines in Kanyakumari district of Tamil Nadu, India. On the day of Sivarathri, the devotees go on a marathon from Thirumalai, the first Sivalayam, to the last, Thirunattalam.

The Sivalayam Temples are

1. Thirumalai
2. Thikkurichi
3. Thiruparappu
4. Thirunanthikkarai
5. Ponmanai
6. Pannippagam
7. Kallkkulam
8. Melancode
9. Thiruvidaicode
10. Thiruvithamkode
11. Thiruppanticode
12. Thirunattalam
