= Tirparappu Waterfalls =

Thriparappu falls
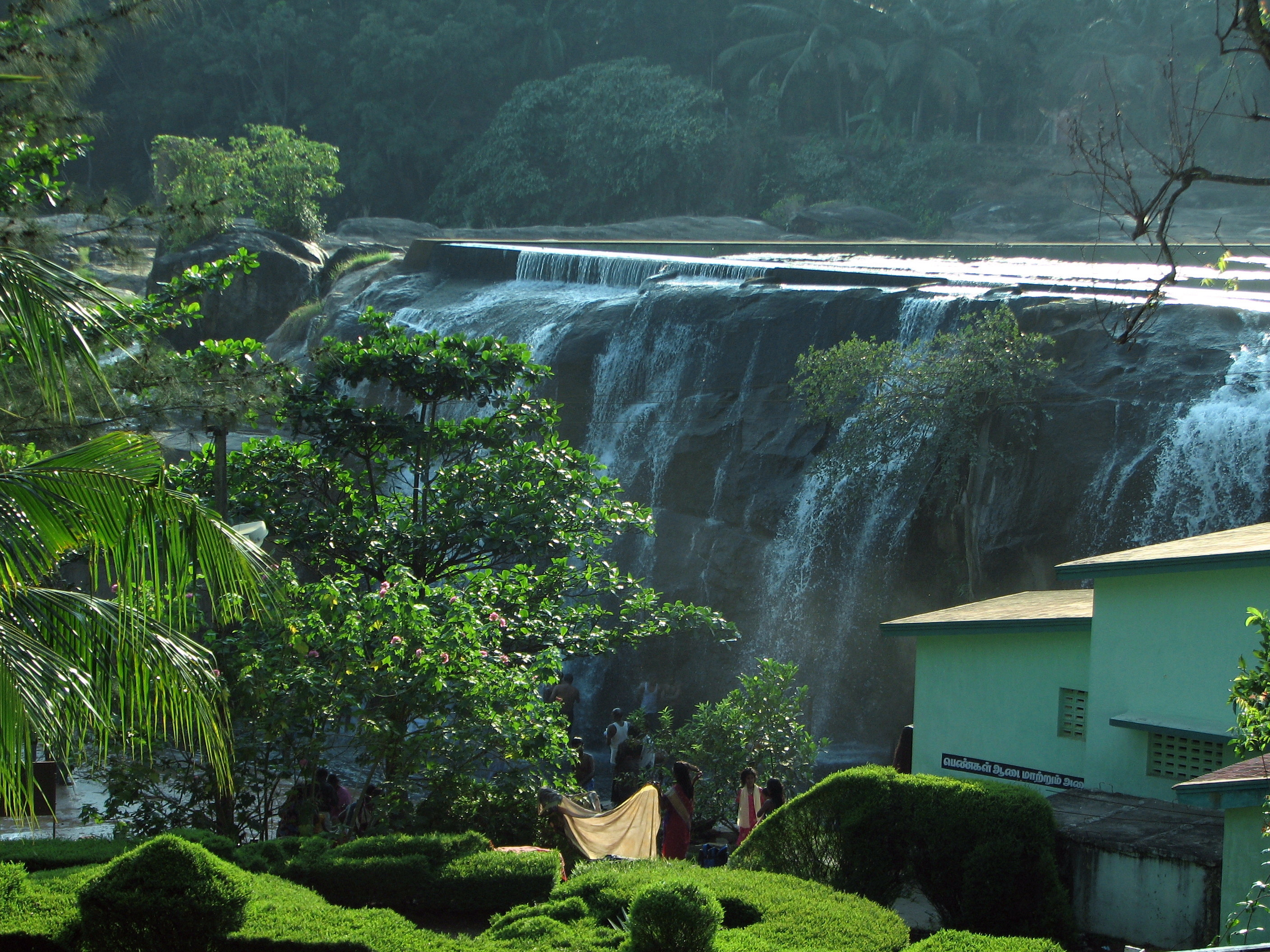
- Interactive map of Thriparappu falls
- Location: Thirparappu
- Coordinates: 8.3913°N 77.2594°E
- Total height: 50 ft (15 m)

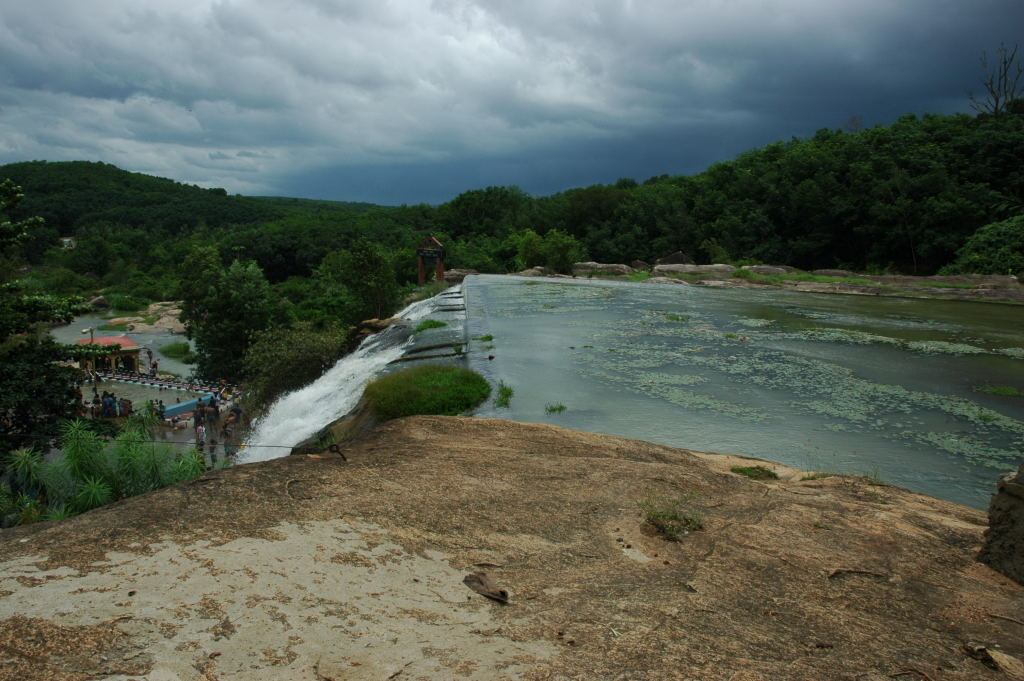
Top of Tirparappu Water Falls

Thirparappu Waterfalls is located near Kulasekharam town in Kanyakumari district, Tamil Nadu state, India.

The Kodayar River makes its descent at Thirparappu. The waterfalls is about 13 kilometres (8.1 mi) from Pechiparai Dam. It is just a 15 min drive from the waterfalls. The riverbed is rocky and about 300 feet (91 m) in length.

Other popular waterfalls in Kanyakumari District are Ullakaarvi falls, Vattaparai Falls and Kalikesam falls. All these falls are located in the Western Ghats.

== Access ==
Thirparappu Waterfalls is about 35 km from Nagercoil, the headquarters of Kanyakumari District, about 55 km from Kanyakumari town and about 52 km from Thiruvananthapuram city, the capital of Kerala.

== See also ==
- List of waterfalls
- List of waterfalls in India
