= Verkilambi =

Coordinates: 8°17′40″N 77°17′40″E

Verkilambi Verkilambi
- Town Panchayat
- Interactive map of Verkilambi
- State: Tamil Nadu
- District: Kanyakumari

Government
  - Type: Democracy
  - Body: Government of Tamil Nadu

Languages
  - Official: Tamil
- Time zone: UTC+5:30 (IST)
- PIN Code: 629166
- Website: http://www.townpanchayat.in/verkilambi

Verkilambi is an interior rural area in the district of Kanyakumari at the state of Tamil Nadu. This is a grade – I Town panchayat spread in a total area of 15.7 Sq. km and consists of 18 wards, represented by 18 councilors. The Executive officer is the administrative head and the elected Chairman is the political head of this Town Panchayat. This was constituted as Kumarankudy Village, Pathmanapapuram MLA Constituency, Nagercoil MP Constituency. The town is located at a distance of 5 km from Ponmanai Town Panchayat on the East, 5 km from Thiruvattar Town Panchayat on the west. 3 km from Kothanalloor Town Panchayat on the South. This town is located along the Kanyakumari, Thiruvananthapuram, National High way and Colachel – Kulasekaram state high way Road through this TP. This TP Constitutes its village component to talking an area of 3.25 Sq. km up graded as town Panchayat

== Manalikkarai ==
Manalikkarai (Formerly Manalikkara) is an old village in the Kothanallur village. It could well be assumed that Manalikkara was the headquarters of the village called Kothanallur. Muttacaud, Kumarapuram, Chempakaramankonam, Aatukkonam, Pavoorkonam, Marankonam and Mundavilai were all constituents of the grand village of Manalikkara. The location is historically important since a medieval king has proclaimed an announcement that came to be called as Manalikkara Sasanam. One of the Tantri (hereditary high priests of Brahmin community) families of Kerala had lived in this village with there address as 'Manalikkara Matom'. The Krishna temple at Vazhikkalampadu is still known as Manalikkara Azhwar sreekrishna swamy temple. There are thousands of Muslims also living in this village known as Manalikarai Muslim jamaath and a mosque is situated in Manalikarai. There are two Catholic churches and one The Salvation Army Church located in Manalikarai. Manalikarai is a village situated at a distance of 10 kilometers from the town Thuckalay and 10 kilometers from the town Marthandam.

Manalikarai is a rural town in the district of Kanyakumari and has a number of educational institutions. One such educational institution is St.Mary Goretty Higher Secondary School.

St.Mary Goretty higher secondary school is a school at state level, and students regularly secure good state level ranking in SSLC exam and go on for further higher education.

Other institutions situated in this place are 1.Carmel nursery and Primary School 2.St. Joseph's Primary School 3.Carmel Girls High School 4.Nirmala Institute of Technology 5.Carmel nursery and primary English school.

A hospital called Carmel Hospital which is more than 30 years old is located here.

Manalikarai market is very famous in olden days.

Route no 13N is connecting this village to the district capital Nagercoil.

== Chemparuthivilai ==
Chemparuthivilai is a small rural town in kanyakumari district, Tamil Nadu, India. Chemparuthivilai is around 5 km distance from Verkilambi. This village is inhabited by around 3000 Tamil people who are of the Christian faith. A decade ago the whole population was Roman Catholic. However, more and more people are moving away from Roman Catholic religion to other Christian denominations such as The Salvation Army Church and Pentecostal. There is a primary English medium School (St Antony's primary School) and a Tamil medium middle school in Chemparuthivilai. Child Development Centre (run by The Salvation Army) and Vocational Training Centre (run by The Salvation Army)

== Vazhikalampadu ==
Vallikillampadu is the village next to Chemparuthivilai. This village is inhabited by people who follow the Hindu religion. This community has a temple which dates back to the Travancore kings era. They have additionally renovated a new temple called Kaverikadu Sree Dharma Sastha temple in this village near the small river which flows along the edge of this town. In 1982 there was a big fight between Chemparuthivialai and Vallikillambadu inhabitants for religious reasons. However, both communities behave in a much more mature manner now, living peacefully side by side.. There are also several other temples around the village such Amman Koil, Samundeshwari Temple and small temples too. Govi store is one of the important landmarks in the village. The village has another nostalgic hospital, called Kamala Clinic which people still calls Ten rupees hospitalis the other beauty.

== Manakkavilai ==
Arulmigu Ambalavanar Thirukkovil is an ancient temple situated in a village called Manakkavilai. The presiding deity of the temple is Lord Shiva. It is believed that there was a samadhi of a great saint whose name is Ambalavanar who lived in this place was located here . This temple is situated 3 kilometers from Verkilambi. The temple was rebuilt in the year 2004 and the festival is organized once in three years.

Poovangapurambu, Kallankuzhi, Mugilankarai, Andamparai, Chithiramcode are some of the villages which surround this place

== Andamparai ==
Andamparai is a small village located near to Manalikarai. Andamparai derives its name from a Rock. There are 2000 people living in the village. One CSI church is located in the village and one The Salvation Army Church located in the Andamparai area where the lower caste peoples were living. This village occupied two pond and surrounded with coconut trees. Major works of the people is rubber tapping, farmer, mason and 40% of the men's are working in gulf countries. 80% of them got education up to school education.

== Maranconam ==
It is a village situated in the midst of four main villages i.e. Mundavilai, Manalikkarai, Mekkamandapam and Chemparuthivilai. It has two C.S.I churches in its area, the Hakkarpuram church and the Maranconam church. It has a Hindu shrine called Chempoosi Kandan Sastha Temple on a hilltop. It belongs to a Pushpaka Brahmin family of Pavoorkonam. Maranconam also has a The Salvation Army Church at Varukkavilai. The place was part of the greater Manalikkara(i)in olden days. It has around 5 ponds.

The main occupation of the people here is farming, rubber tapping.

There are two buses which moves in and out of this village which connects four important towns in the district.

== Poovangaparambu ==
Poovangaparambu is a small village located near to Manalikarai. Poovangaparambu derives its name from a flower cultivation. There are 1000 people are living in the village. One Sri Samundeeswari Amman temple and Bathirakali amman temple is located in the village. Manalikkara Azhwar sreekrishna swamy temple is 2 km from here. This village occupied one pond called annikulam and surrounded with coconut trees. great saint whose name is Ambalavanar who lived in this place belongs to Poovangaparambu. Major works of the people is rubber tapping, farmer, drivers, there are professional like engineers, lawyer, software professional, teachers, professors living in this village and 90% of them got education up to school education.
