= Thiruvattar taluk =

Thiruvattar Taluk is one of the six taluks in Kanyakumari district. Its headquarters is in Cherupaloor, Kulasekharam. The taluk was established as a result of the bifurcation of the erstwhile Kalkulam Taluk. Thiruvattar Taluk is administratively divided into two firkas: Thiruvattar and Kulasekharam, which collectively cover its 21 revenue villages.
