= Thirunattalam =

Neighbourhood in Kanyakumari district, Tamil Nadu, India

Thirunattalam Nattalam
- Town
- Thirunattalam's location within the state of Tamil Nadu
- Coordinates: 8.277194°N 77.226988°E
- Country: India
- State: Tamil Nadu
- District: Kanyakumari

Thirunattalam, also called Nattalam, is a Panchayat town in Kanyakumari district in the Indian State of Tamil Nadu. It is located 4 km (2.5 mi) from Marthandam, 6 km (3.7 mi) from Karungal and 10 km (6.2 mi) from Thuckalay.

== Demographics ==
As of the 2001 India census, Thirunattalam had a population of around 11,037. Males constitute 51% of the population and females 49%. Thirunattalam has an average literacy rate of 79.9%, higher than the national average of 59.5%: male literacy is 81%, and female literacy is 77%.

The village was given the Nirmal Gram Puraskar award in 2006.

== Religion ==
The last temple of Sivalaya Ottam is in Thirunattalam. On the day of Sivarathri, devotees of Siva finish their 24-hour marathon in Thirunattalam. It is the 12th temple in this marathon.
