= Swamiyar Madam =

Swamiyar Madam is a village located in the Kanyakumari district of Tamil Nadu, India, on National Highway 66, approximately 44 km southeast of Trivandrum. This village has a mosque named Shahul Hameediya Jumma Masjid.

Swamiyarmadam is also famous for Saint Thadeyus church, Kanjimadam Sree Dharma Sastha Temple, and sree Vana Sastha Sree Vana Durga Temple. The Kuruswamy Mani General Merchant Store is about 40 years old.

The original name of Swamiyarmadam is Elanthai Ampalam. The market is still called Elanthaiampalam Market.
