= Vattaparai Falls =

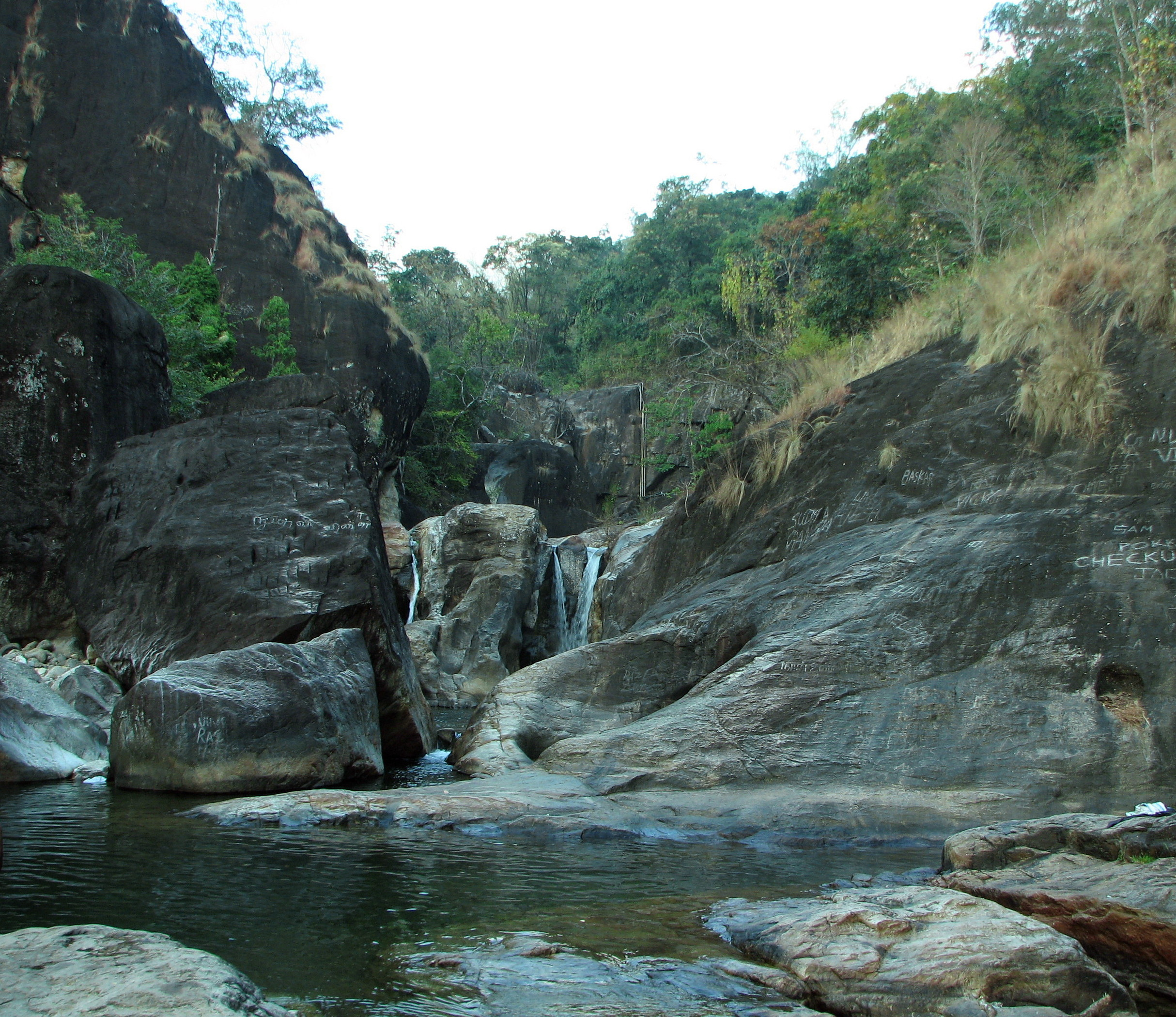
- Interactive map of Vattaparai Falls

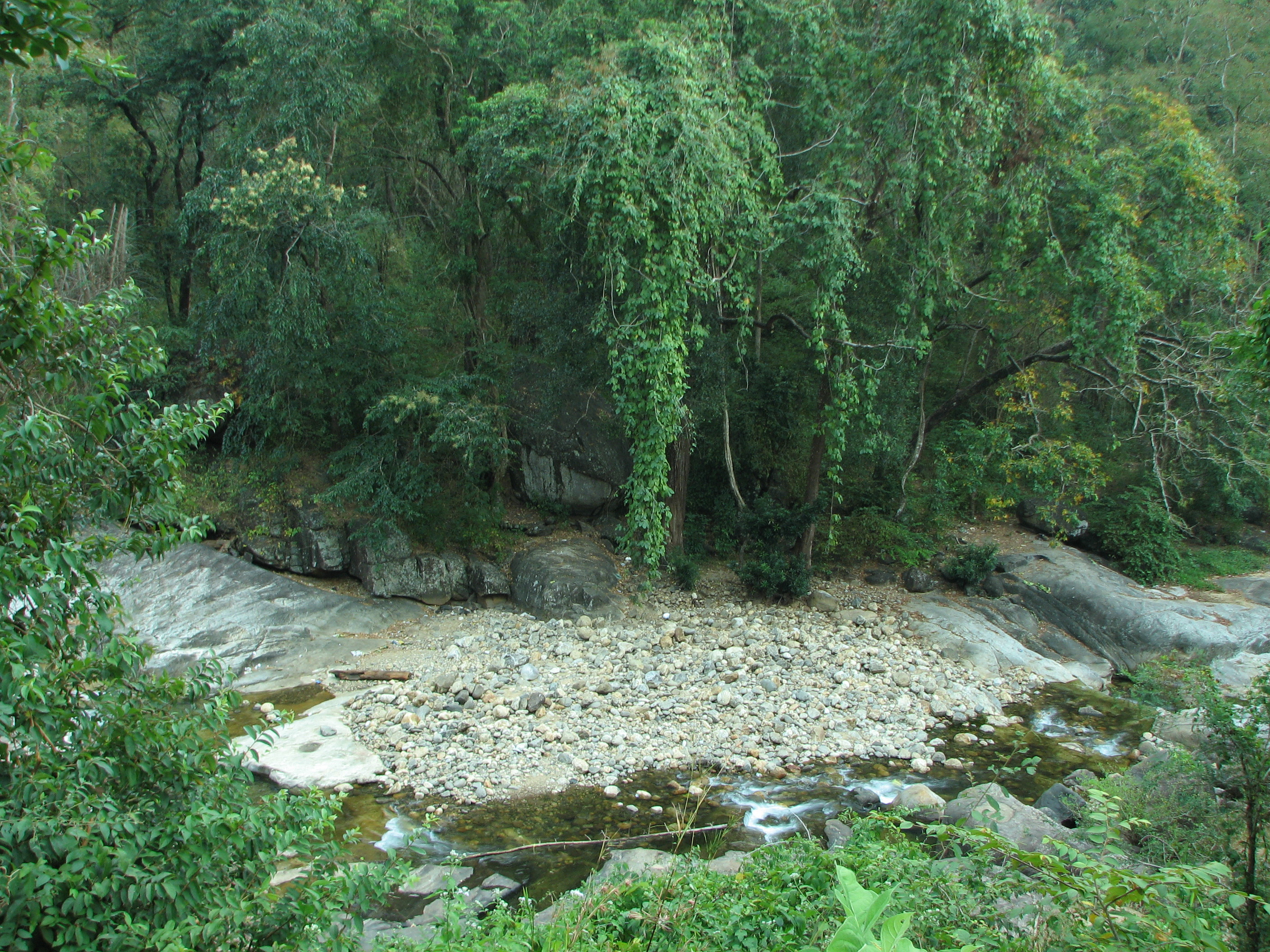
Stream in Keeriparai Reserve Forest

Vattaparai Falls are located at: 8°15.919′N 77°27.062′E, elevation 40 m (130 ft), in the Keeriparai reserve forest near Bhoothapandi village (Pin:629852) (Met Sta #10145) on the Pazhayar River in Kanyakumari district, Tamil Nadu state, South India. It is 25 km (16 mi) N of Nagercoil) and 32 km (20 mi) NW of Kanyakumari. This 20 km^{2} (7.7 sq mi) area is proposed to be a Wildlife Sanctuary.

There are a few small waterfalls in this area - the noticeable ones being Vattaparai Falls and Kalikesam falls. There is a small Kali temple, next to the falls. This is a very serene and undeveloped place with only one small tea stall. One can enjoy water rushing through small mountain streams, ferns and pebbles in the rainforests. The falls are surrounded by forest on all sides and form part of an active animal corridor. The long stream is pollution-free. People are allowed to take a natural bath here and it is believed that the water from the stream has some medicinal effects.

This is a serene and peaceful place. It is unlike the most popular falls in this district, the Tirparappu Water Falls on the Kodayar River, which has become a typical crowded tourist spot.

== See also ==
- List of waterfalls
- List of waterfalls in India
