= Ponmanai =

Coordinates: 8°21′01″N 77°19′33″E

- panchayat town
- Interactive map of Ponmanai
- Country: India
- State: Tamil Nadu
- District: Kanniyakumari

Population (2001)
  - Total: 13,553

Languages
  - Official: Tamil
- Time zone: UTC+5:30 (IST)

Ponmanai is a panchayat town in Kanniyakumari district in the Indian state of Tamil Nadu. Snehalatha arts club, one of the oldest of club in Kanyakumari ( started in 1975 ) named after Actress Snehalatha reddy is still doing many social services. Gramasabha is also an old organization. Writer and Social Activist Ponmanai Valsakumar born at this place.

== Demographics ==
As of 2001 India census, Ponmanai had a population of 13,553. Males constitute 50% of the population and females 50%. Ponmanai has an average literacy rate of 76%, higher than the national average of 59.5%: male literacy is 78%, and female literacy is 74%. In Ponmanai, 10% of the population is under 6 years of age. Thimbileshwarar Temple(5th shivalaya), a Hindu Temple dedicated to Lord Shiva is located here. Chaakku Swami temple (Ponmanai to Valiyatumugam road) (5th to 6th Shivalaya route) is also located here.

== Snehalatha Arts (Ponmanai) ==
Snehalatha Arts is a cultural and social organization based in Ponmanai, a village in Kanyakumari district, Tamil Nadu, India. Established in the mid-1970s, the organization is known for organizing an annual Thiruvonam (Onam) festival and conducting cultural, educational, and community welfare activities.

Ponmanai, formerly part of the erstwhile Kingdom of Travancore, has a long tradition of celebrating the Thiruvonam festival. While the festival is observed separately by different parts of the village, a common celebration at the village junction has been organized for more than five decades.

Snehalatha Arts was founded by a group of progressive young people from Ponmanai, many of whom were influenced by left-wing ideals, during the period of the Indian Emergency (1975–1977). The organization was named in honor of Snehalatha Reddy, an Indian film and theatre actress, social activist, and political detainee who was imprisoned during the Emergency.

Before Snehalatha Reddy's death in January 1977, the founders launched a handwritten monthly magazine in her name to commemorate her legacy. This initiative later evolved into Snehalatha Arts, which has continued its activities under successive generations of volunteers.

=== Activities ===
Since its establishment, Snehalatha Arts has organized a wide range of cultural and literary events, including stage plays, modern Villisai (bow-song folk performances), storytelling sessions, quizzes, and public lectures. The organization has also invited renowned theatre troupes from Kerala and prominent speakers to participate in its annual celebrations.

The organization's activities are primarily supported through public donations from residents and former villagers, reflecting community trust in its social and cultural initiatives.

=== Annual Thiruvonam Festival ===
The festival included:

- A free medical camp with consultations and distribution of medicines.

- Sports competitions for children, women, and adults.

- Literary and cultural competitions for school students.

- Traditional lamp-lighting ceremonies.

- A community Onam feast open to people of all religions and castes.

- An annual quiz competition, regarded as one of the organization's signature events.

- A public pledge promoting a drug-free society under the theme "Drug-Free Ponmanai."

- Dance competitions and prize distribution ceremonies.

=== Community Welfare ===
In addition to cultural activities, Snehalatha Arts undertakes several welfare initiatives during the festival, including:

- Financial assistance for economically disadvantaged patients requiring medical treatment.

- Distribution of school bags and educational materials to underprivileged students.

- Educational support for students facing financial hardship.

- Distribution of Onam sarees to sanitation workers and economically disadvantaged women.

- Recognition and awards for students with outstanding academic achievements.

- Prizes for participants and winners of sports, cultural, and literary competitions.

=== Community Participation ===
The annual festival is supported by volunteers from Ponmanai, including many who live and work outside the village and return each year to contribute their time and resources. Their participation has helped sustain the festival as an important community event, promoting cultural heritage, social service, and communal harmony in Ponmanai.
