= Marthandam =

- Municipality
- Location within Tamil Nadu
- Coordinates: 8.3076°N 77.221785°E
- Country: India
- State: Tamil Nadu
- District: Kanyakumari

Government
  - Type: democratic
  - Body: municipality

Languages
  - Official: Tamil
  - Minority: Malayalam
- Time zone: UTC+5:30 (IST)
- PIN: 629165
- Telephone code: 04651
- Vehicle registration: TN-75
- Nearby Cities: Nagercoil & Trivandrum
- Lok Sabha constituency: Kanyakumari
- Tamil Nadu Legislative Assembly constituency: Vilavancode
- Literacy: 96.3%

Marthandam is a major trade centre in Kuzhithurai municipality across State Highway in the Kanyakumari district of Tamil Nadu, India. Marthandam comes under the kuzhithurai Municipality, also known as Thoduvetty (another name for the Marthandam market region), it was a portion of Kanyakumari district which was added to the state of Tamil Nadu on 1 November 1956.

Marthandam is the second-largest town in the district. It derived its name from the founder and ruler of Travancore, Anizham Thirunal Marthanda Varma. Marthandam is famous for honey, cashew nut processing, rubber and hand-embroidered motifs. The area is among the most fertile lands of Tamil Nadu, with substantial vegetation and a river adjoining. It is also a major trade centre due to its location bordering Kerala.

Marthandam Honey, a distinctive and natural product from the Kanyakumari District in Tamil Nadu, received the Geographical Indication (GI) tag in 2023. Registered under GI Application No. 800, it holds the distinction of being the GI product of India. Known for its purity, unique flavor, and medicinal properties, Marthandam Honey reflects the rich biodiversity and traditional beekeeping practices of the region.

== History ==
Southern Division, or Padmanabhapuram Division till 1921 and Trivandrum Division from 1921 to 1949, was one of the administrative divisions of the princely state of Travancore. It covered the five taluks of Agastiswaram, Eraniel, Kalkulam, Thovalay and Vilavancode and was administered by a civil servant of rank Diwan Peishkar equivalent to a District Collector in British India. The Southern division was predominantly Tamil-speaking in contrast to the other three divisions where Malayalam was spoken. In 1920, the neighbouring Trivandrum was also merged with the Southern division. In 1949, the princely state of Travancore was dissolved and the Southern Division was included in the Travancore-Cochin state of India. In 1956, the Tamil-speaking taluks of Southern Division were transferred to the neighbouring Madras State as per the States Reorganisation Act of 1956 and forms the present-day Kanyakumari district of Tamil Nadu. The Malayalam-speaking taluks of the erstwhile Trivandrum division form the Thiruvananthapuram district of Kerala. The headquarters of the Southern Division were at Padmanabhapuram.

== Education ==
=== Colleges ===
- BWDA Polytechnic College

== Industries in Marthandam ==
Industrial Opportunities in Marthandam

There are rubber, coir, fruit based and wood-based industries. The influence of both Tamil and Kerala artisans produces unique designs and furniture works. Wood industries, directly and indirectly, employ a few thousand people.

== Geography ==
It is one of the most fertile lands of Tamil Nadu and has the climatic conditions of Kerala. It has a railway line connecting the capital of Kerala, Trivandrum, with the southernmost tip of India, Kanyakumari. Marthandam is well connected to Chennai, Mumbai, Bangalore by rail service also bus service to all over Tamil Nadu. The river Thamirabarani runs through the Marthandam city and every year a festival known as Vavubali is celebrated at the banks of river Thamirabarani.

== Climate ==
Climate data for Kanyakumari
Month	Jan	Feb	Mar	Apr	May	Jun	Jul	Aug	Sep	Oct	Nov	Dec	Year
Mean daily maximum °C (°F)	28 (82)	28 (82)	30 (86)	32 (90)	32 (90)	29 (84)	28 (82)	28 (82)	28 (82)	28 (82)	27 (81)	27 (81)	29 (84)
Mean daily minimum °C (°F)	24 (75)	24 (75)	26 (79)	27 (81)	28 (82)	26 (79)	26 (79)	26 (79)	25 (77)	25 (77)	23 (73)	22 (72)	25 (77)

== Transport ==
=== Roads ===
Marthandam lies in the National Highway (NH66) connecting Kanyakumari to Panvel. The main bus stand of Marthandam is located along the Market Road in Kaalaichanthai. This bus stand is the base for MTM-based TNSTC (local) and SETC (long-distance buses). KeralaSRTC buses and also SETC buses to Chennai, Bengaluru, Ooty, Vellore and Pondichery operate from here. Private long-distance buses departing from Marthandam operate from various parts of the town. Marthandam is one of the heavy-traffic areas in the two-lane section of NH544. The recent steel flyover which spans more than 2 km has considerably reduced the traffic. Other major state roads from Marthandam include MTM-Pechiparai road via Kuzhithurai, MTM-Kulasekaram road and MTM-Colachal road.

=== Air ===
The nearest Airport is Trivandrum International & Domestic Airport (TRV), Kerala. Distance is about 40 kilometres (25 mi) from Marthandam.

=== Railways ===
Kuzhithurai(Marthandam) is the second largest station in the district.It has a railway line connecting the capital of Kerala, Trivandrum, with the southernmost tip of India, Kanyakumari. Kuzhithurai station serves the town of Marthandam and is found midway along the Trivandrum — Kanyakumari railway line. This railway station's collection is more than seven crore per annum and a daily passenger patronage of more than 50,000 people. The station has two platforms and falls on the Kanyakumari—Trivandrum line in the Trivandrum Division of the Southern Railway zone. Marthandam is well connected to Chennai, Mumbai, Delhi, Howrah and all over India by the rail service. Kuzhithurai West is the secondary station where only local trains halt.

== Religion ==
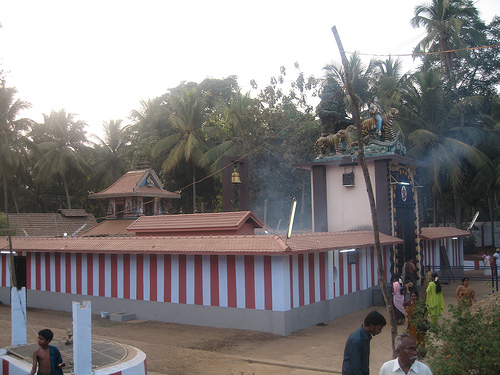
Vedisasthan Kovil

The Lord Ayyappa temple in Marthandam is at the banks of Kuzhithurai River. This temple is known as either "Vettuvenni temple" or "Vedi Vechan Kovil". The latter one due to the fire crackers being set off at the temple as a mark of prayer to Lord Ayyappa. This temple is just by the side of National Highway NH-47 connecting Trivandrum with Nagercoil.

The Sree Krishna temple is at Kannacode in Marthandam. The name of the locality Kannacode is derived from the presence of this temple dedicated to Sree Krishna (Kanna) who is in Balagopala form in this temple. Historical records say that Travancore king Sri Vishakam Thirunal who ruled from 1880 to 1885 used to pray every month at this temple to ward off his BudhagrahaDosham. Renovation of the temple has been recently done through contributions from devotees. Situated in a peaceful location on the banks of the Tamiravaruni river, this temple is called Guruvayoor of Kanyakumari district. On the Rohini star day of every Tamil/Malayalam month, SriSudarsana homam is conducted in this temple.

The Alappancode Sree Easwarakla Boothathan Temple is just 4 kilometres (2.5 mi) from Kuzhithura Jn towards Arumana Road and adjacent to Melpuram Jn. In Tamil Nadu it is the only temple where a large number of caparisoned elephants participate in the annual festival. Every year more than thirty-five decorated elephants join the procession. The procession starts from the Kariyathara Temple in Anducode and finishes in Alappancode, and the procession covers about seven kilometres (4.3 miles). Devotees from Kerala and Tamil Nadu gather here to see the festival. The festival is held on the last Saturday of December.

The Sree Chamundesari temple is just adjacent to the Mahadevar temple. Though the temples are under the Devaswam board, they are maintained by a trust called Kuzhithurai Sree Mahadevar Shektra Samrakshna Samithi; with the help of devotees of this surrounding area, the committee has spent a huge amount for the renovation of the temples. A large number of devotees from Kanyakumari and Trivadrum District visit Sree Chamundeswari Temple for special poojas, especially unmarried girls, wishing for a good married life.

The Anjukannu Kalungu Sree Madan Thampuram Yakshi Amman Temple's festivals are: Yearly festival for 7 days, Shivrathri (Shivalaya Ottam), Saraswathy pooja, Deepawali, Thrikkarthika, Monthly Ammavasya, yearly Kumbhabishegam, Pongal. The main festivals celebrated there are Samivaravu, Sivarathri, Vavubali, and Onam.

The Marthandam CSI Church on the Main Road at the junction was built by Rev. Robert Sinclair born in Scotland who came to India after his ordination as a minister on 3 August 1910, in Scotland. He succeeded Rev. H.I. Hacker in 1919 and came to Marthandam and served from 1920 to 1939.

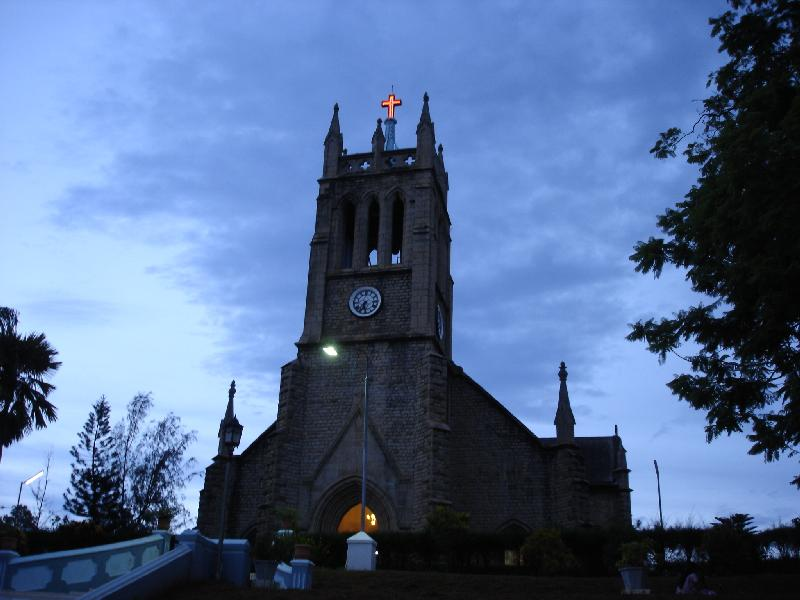
CSI District Church in Marthandam

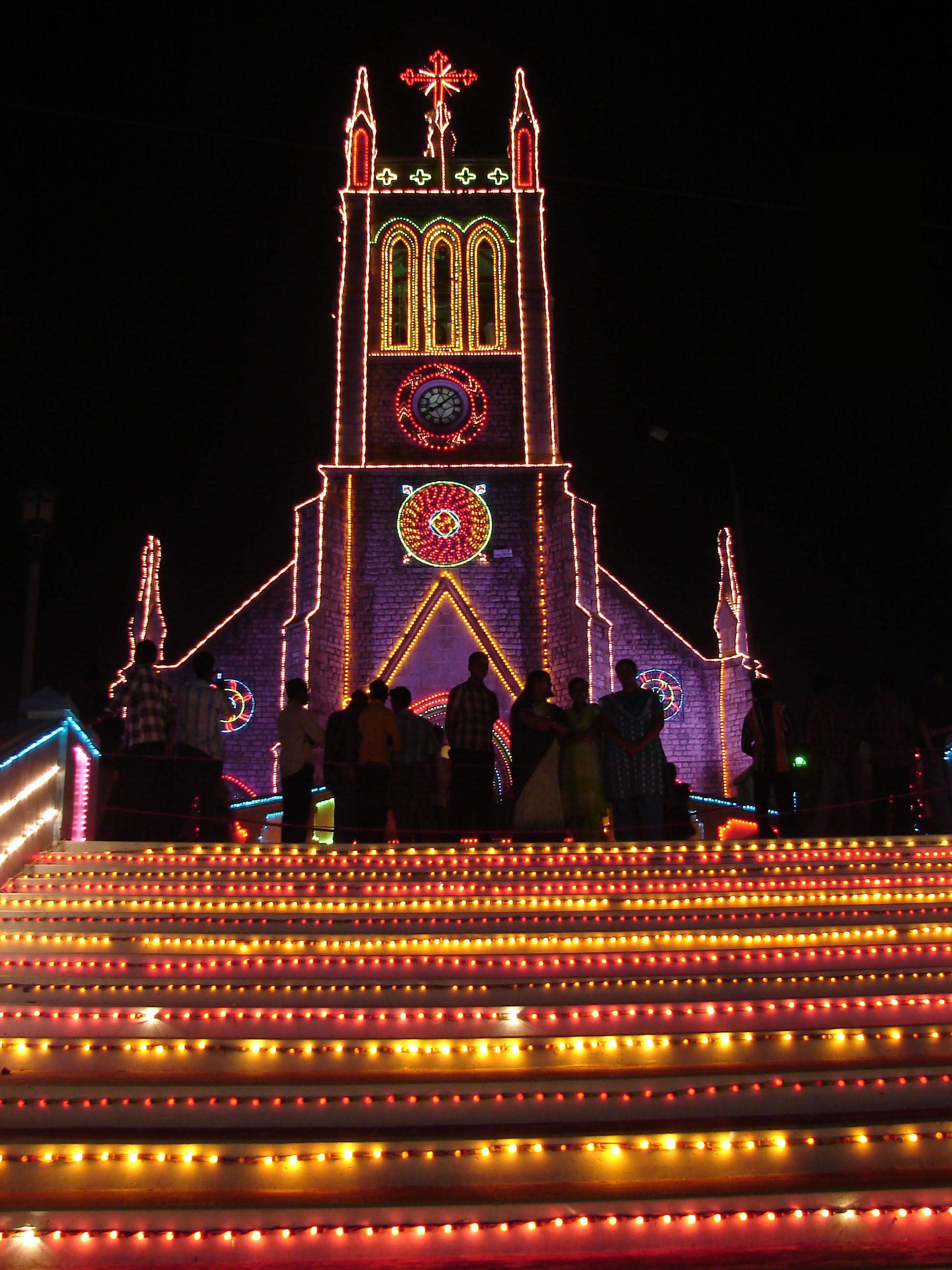
Light Decorations During Christmas

=== Religious festivals ===
Pongal, Onam and Christmas celebrations are quite substantial in Marthandam. In this district, Christmas is celebrated more than in the rest of Tamil Nadu. Vishu is also celebrated well in this district due to its neighbour Kerala and the presence of Malayalam-speaking people throughout the border of district. Also festivals such as Deepavali, New Year, Eid, and Easter are celebrated in this district.

== Attractions ==
=== Tourist spots nearby ===
Padmanabhapuram Palace

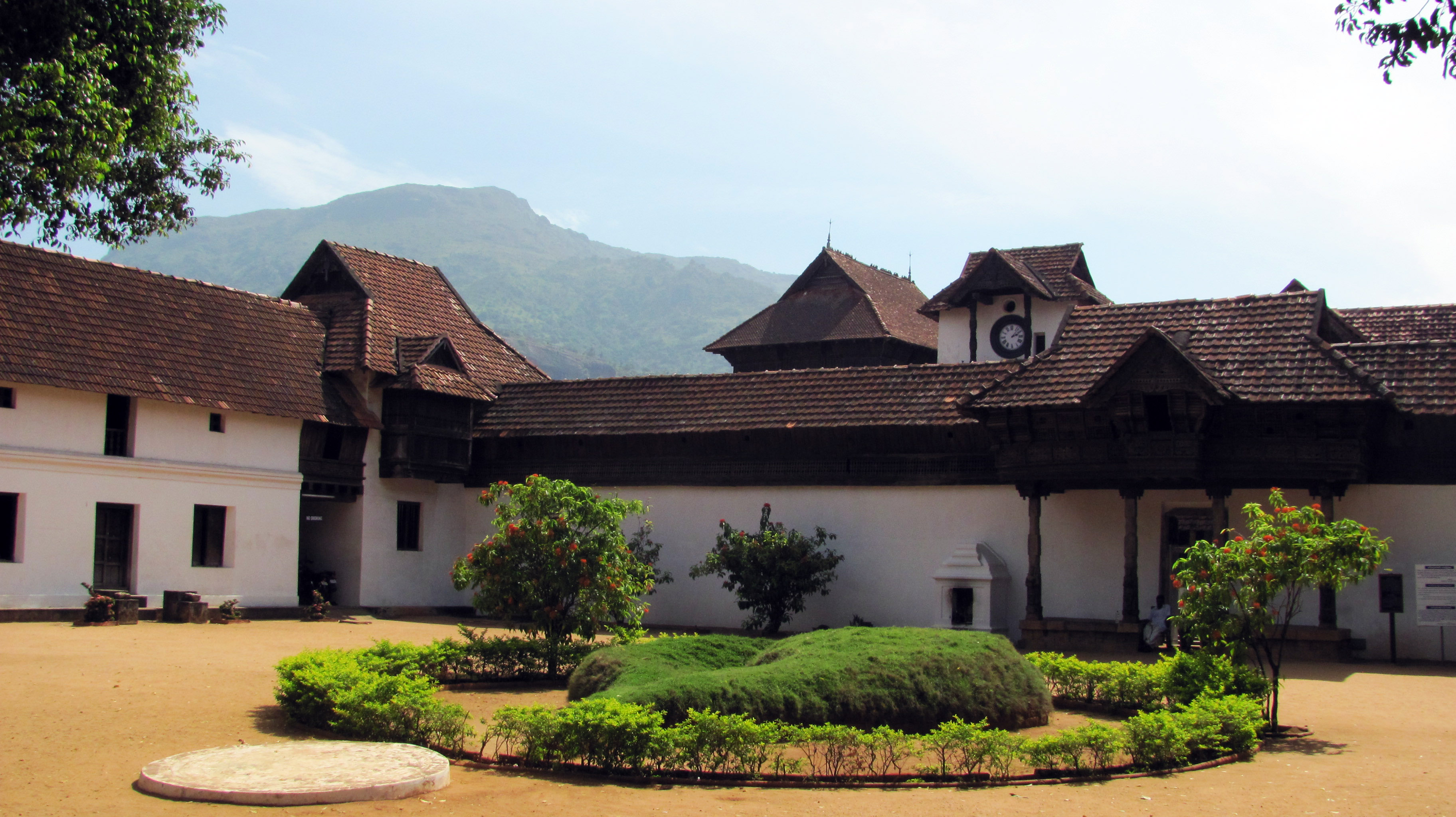
Padmanabhapuram Palace

Udayagiri Fort

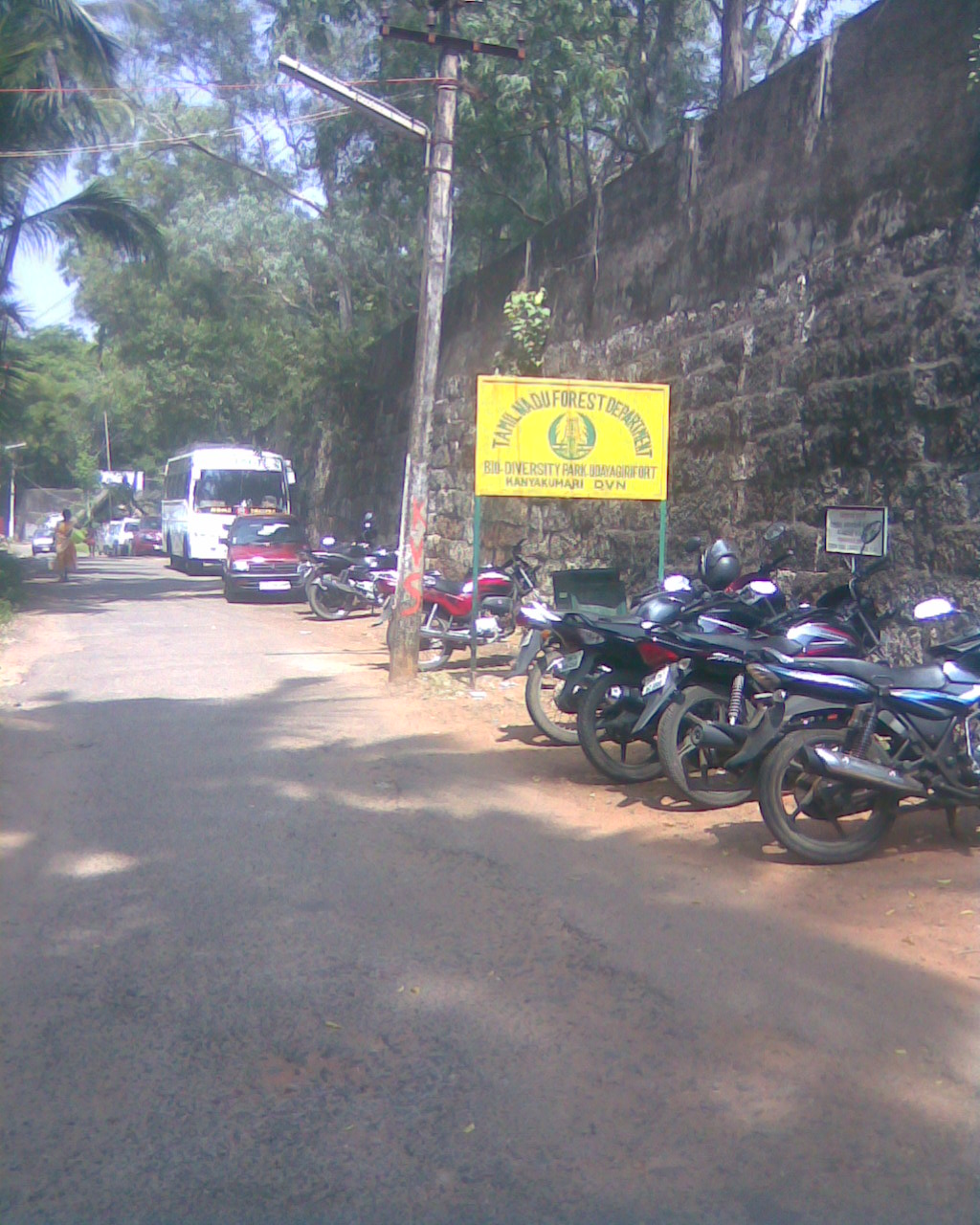
Udayakiri fort

Thirparappu waterfalls

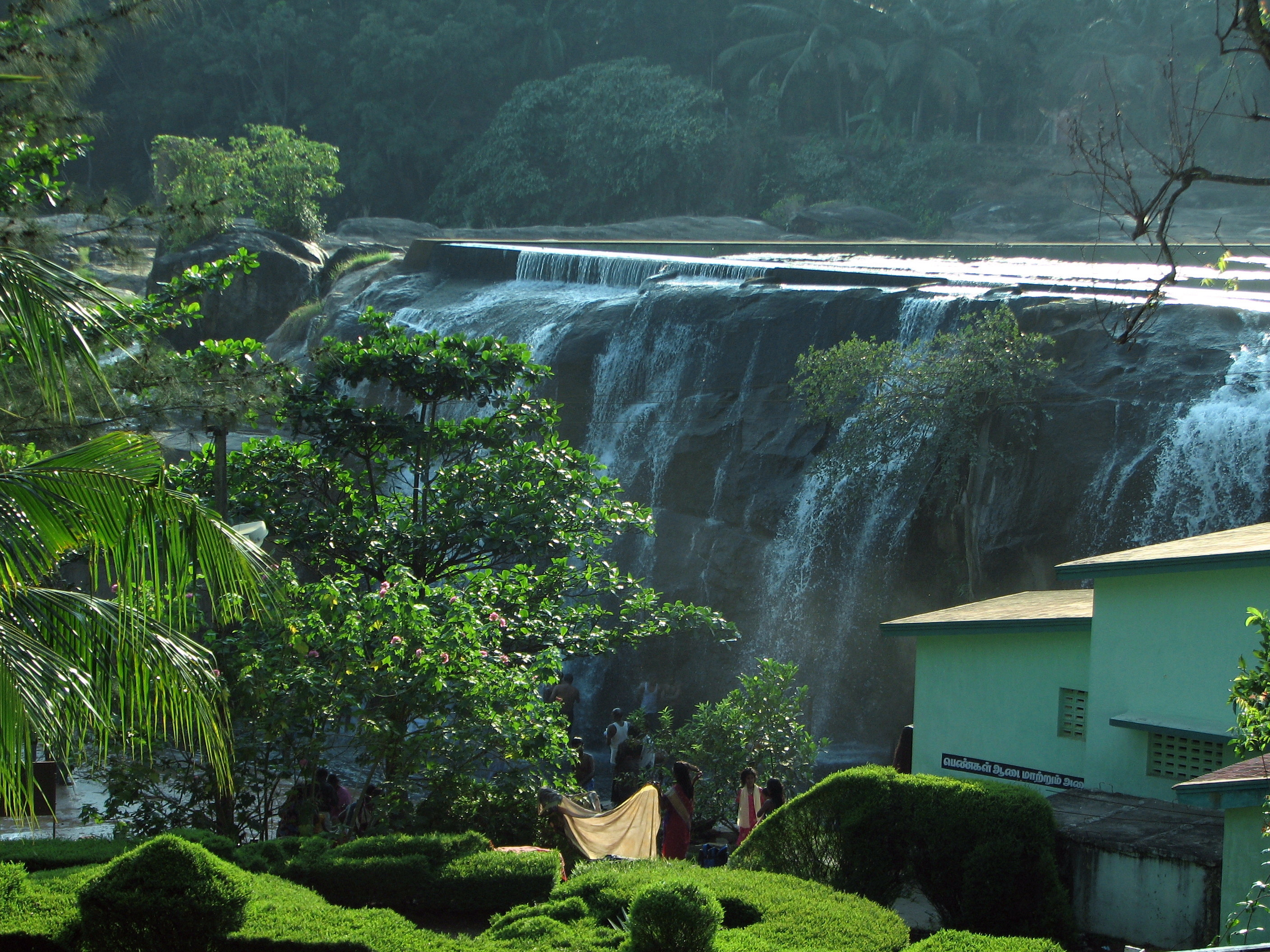
Thriparappu falls

Pechiparai Reservoir

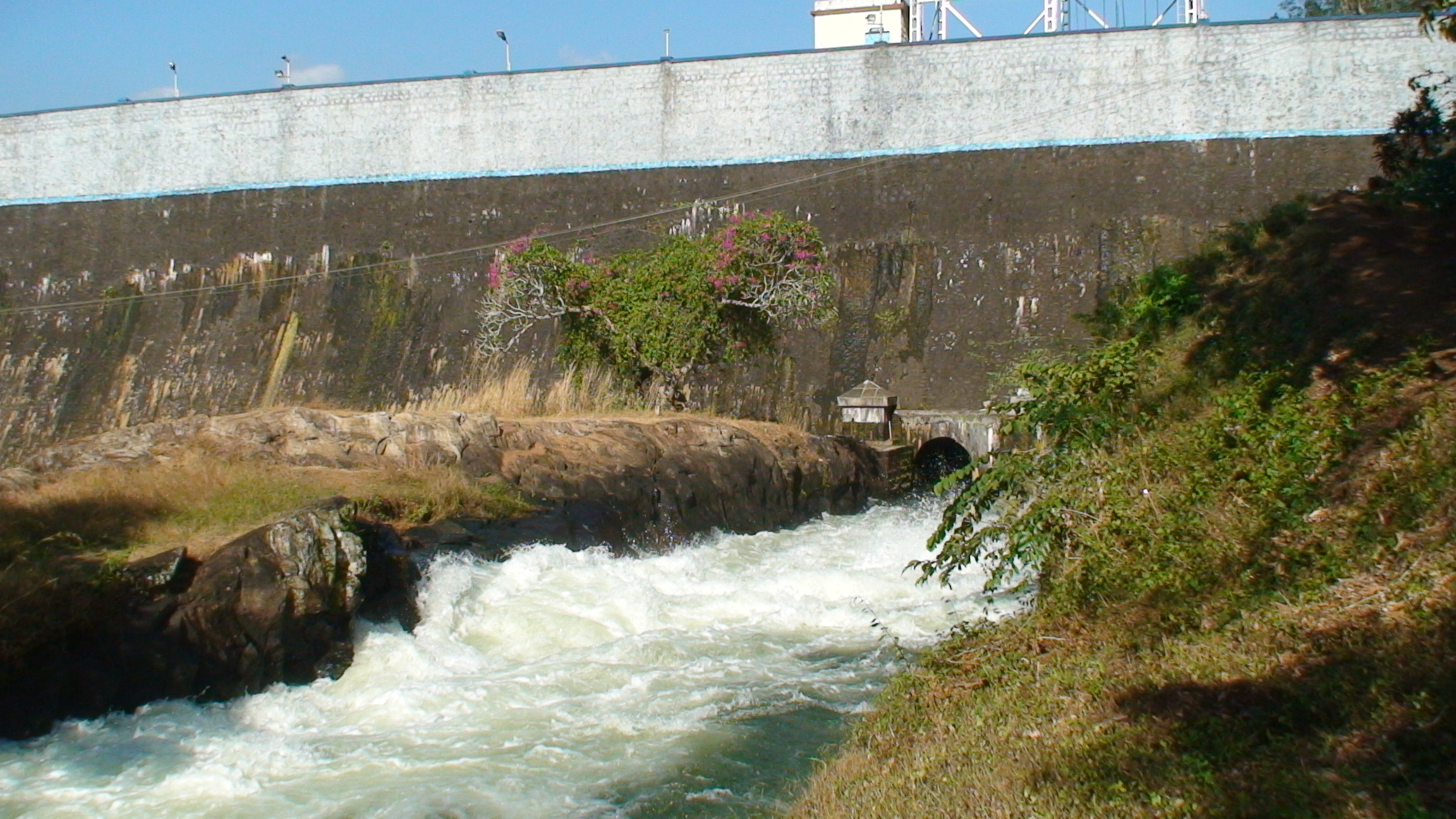
Pechiparai dam

Thengapattanam Beach

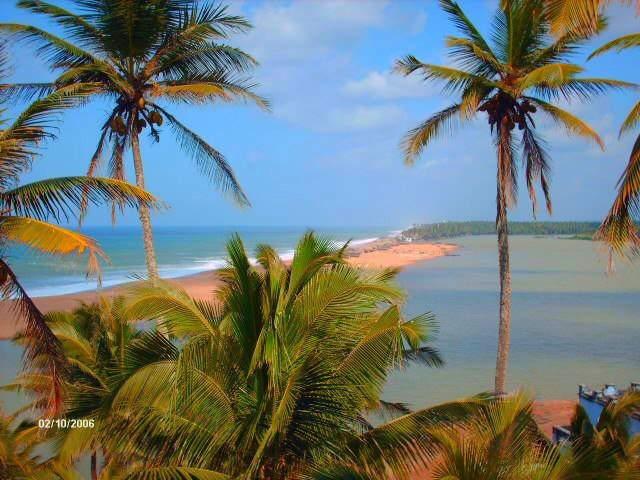
Thengapattanam beach

Chitharal Jain Temple

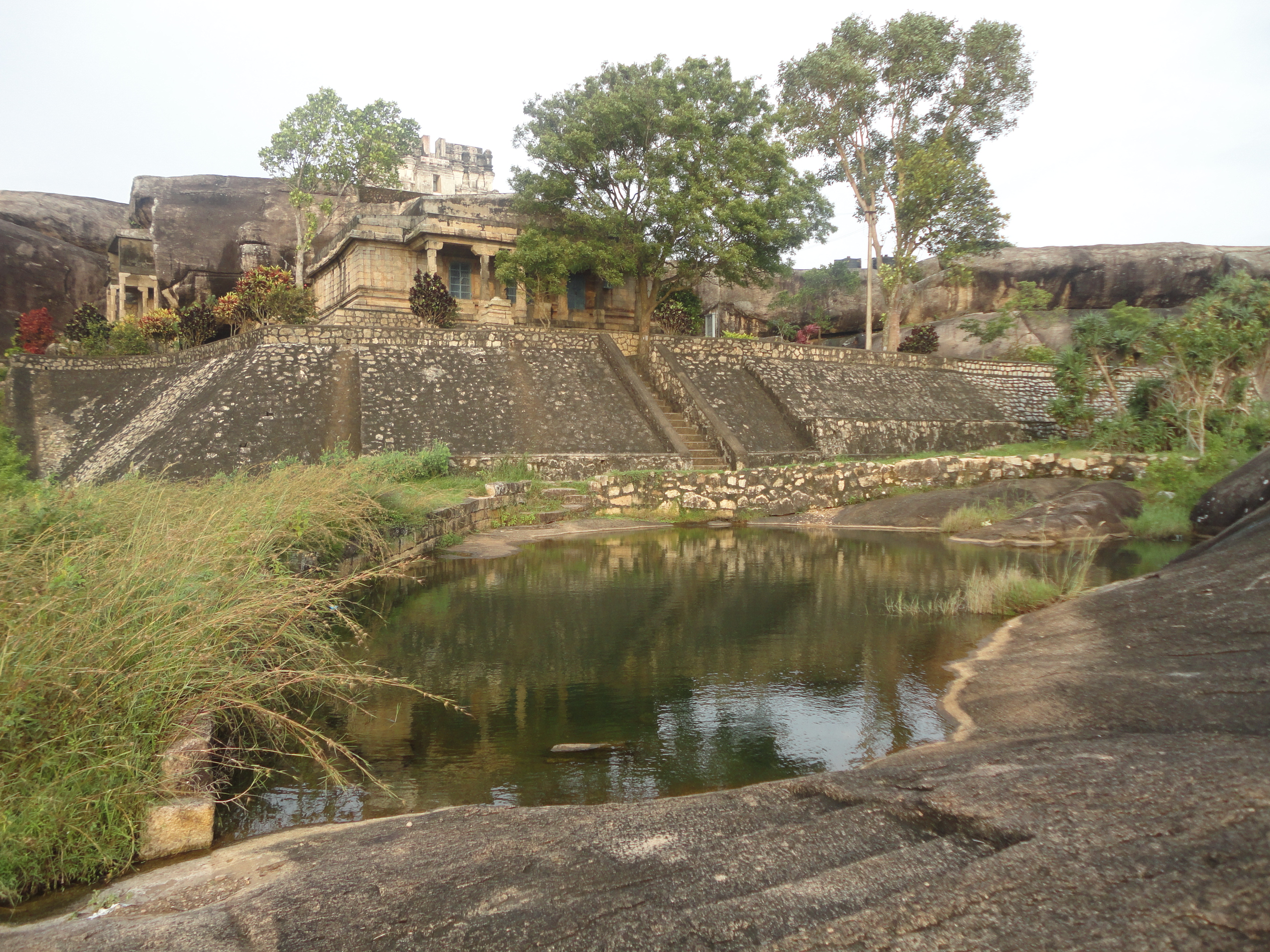
Chitharal Jain Temple, Tamil Nadu

Mathur Aqueduct

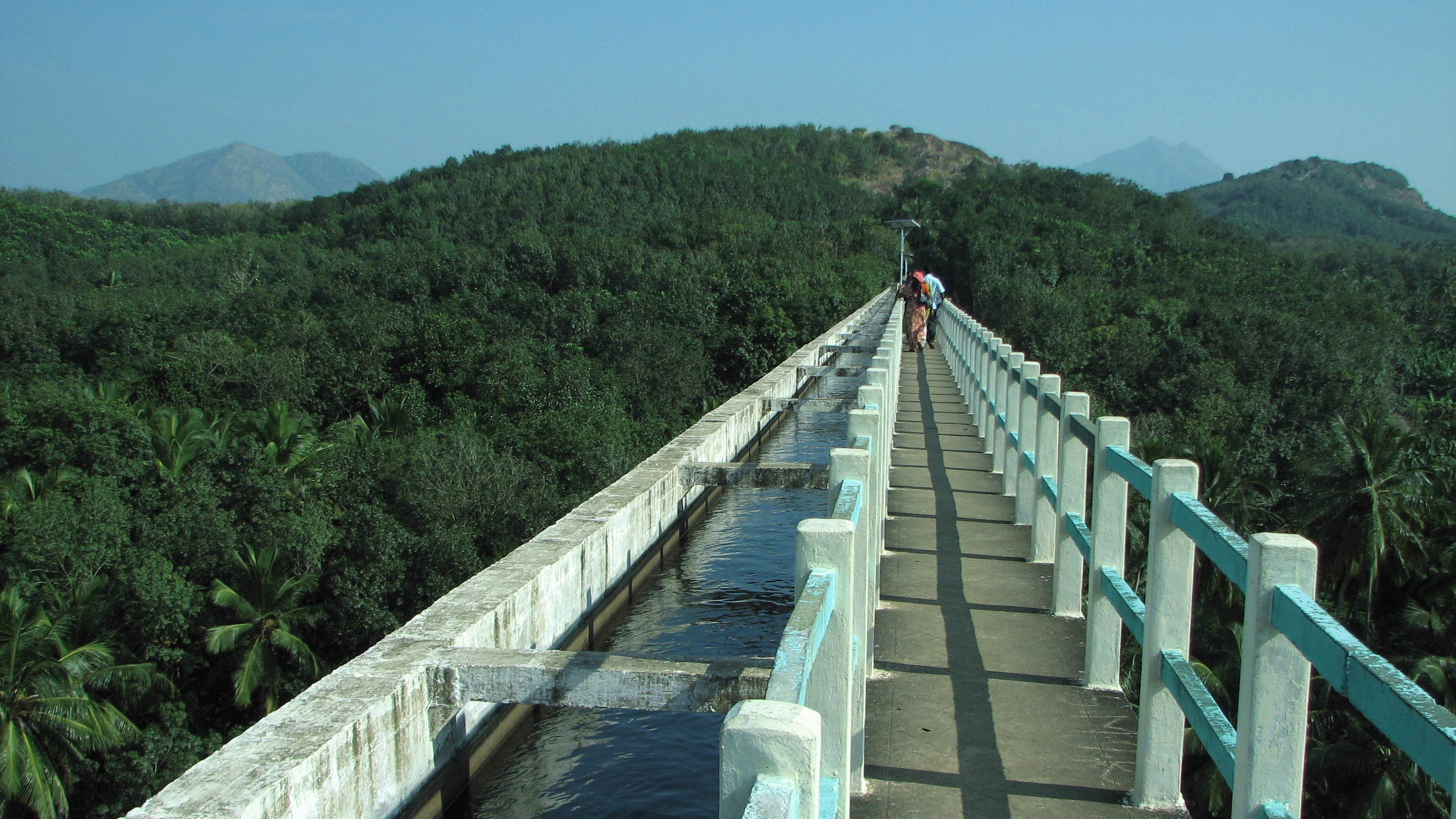
Mathur Aqueduct - one of the largest Aqueducts in Asia

== Adjacent communities ==
Nearby towns include Kuzhithurai, Pacode, and Thirunattalam.
