= Thirparappu =

- Location in Tamil Nadu, India
- Coordinates: 8°23′28″N 77°15′34″E
- Country: India
- State: Tamil Nadu
- District: Kanyakumari

Population (2001)
  - Total: 21,722

Languages
  - Official: Tamil
- Time zone: UTC+5:30 (IST)

Thirparappu is a town located in the Kanyakumari District in the Indian state of Tamil Nadu. It is a popular tourist destination. It is located 5.9 km (3.7 mi) from the nearby town Arumanai, 6.9 km (4.3 mi) from Kulasekaram, 42 km (26 mi) from Nagercoil, headquarters of the Kanyakumari District, and 55 km (34 mi) from Thiruvananthapuram, the capital of the Indian state of Kerala. It is famous for its falls on the Kodayar (Kothai) River and the Pechiparai Dam, located 13 km (8.1 mi) away.

== Geography ==
=== Tirparappu falls ===
Tirparappu Waterfalls are a 300 ft (91 m) long rocky riverbed, at a height of nearly 50 ft (15 m). The waterfall flows with great force for around seven months. The bed above the falls is a rocky mass extending up to a distance of about quarter of a kilometre upstream, with a weir constructed for supplying water to nearby paddy fields.

Near the falls is a fortified temple dedicated to Shiva, called the Mahadever Kovil. It is third of the twelve Shivalayas, famous for the Shivalaya Ottam during the Indian festival of Shivaratri. Devotees believe Mahadev lives here as Virabhadra, a fierce incarnation of Shiva to kill Daksha Prajapati, after the death Satidevi. There are many old inscriptions in this temple including one of the Pandiya King dated ninth century. This temple is built around A.D. 9th century.

== Demographics ==
As of 2001 India census, Thirparappu (Thriparappu) had a population of 21,722. Males constitute 49% of the population and females 51%. Thirparappu (Thriparappu) has an average literacy rate of 75%, higher than the national average of 59.5%: male literacy is 78%, and female literacy is 72%. In Thirparappu, 10% of the population is under 6 years of age.
