= Pechiparai Reservoir =

Reservoir in Tamil Nadu, India

Pechiparai Dam
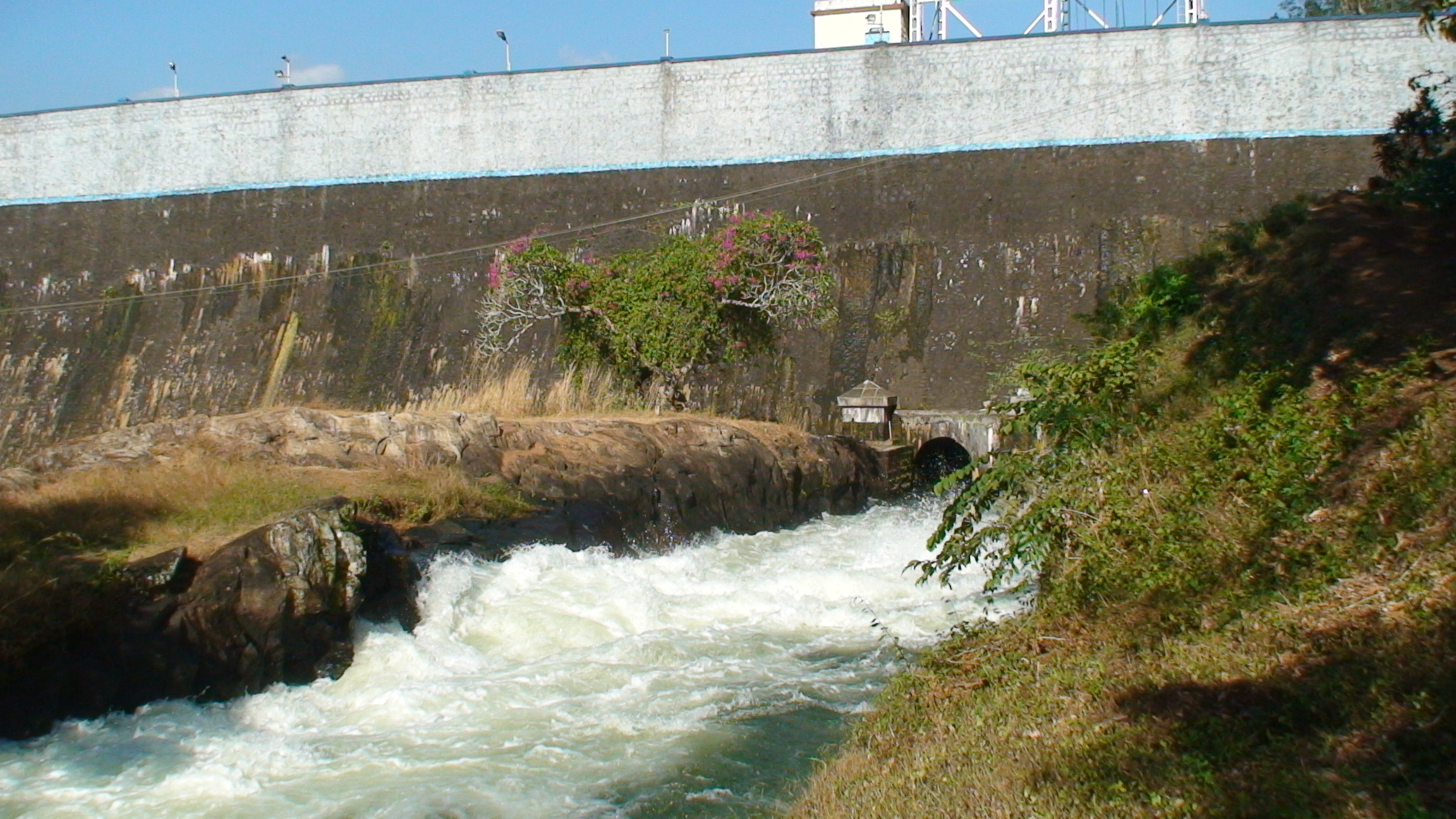
- Water flowing through the gate of Pechiparai dam

- Location within Tamil Nadu
- Coordinates: 8.44249°N 77.31354°E
- Opening date: 1906

Dam and spillways
- Length: 555 m
- Spillways: 6
- Spillway type: Ogee

Reservoir
- Total capacity: 123 TCM

Pechiparai Reservoir is the largest dam in Kanyakumari district. It is located in the foothills of the Western Ghats in the Kanyakumari district of Tamil Nadu at Pachiparai. It is located 43 kilometers (27 mi) from the district capital Nagercoil. This dam is built across the Kotai river. This dam was built during the period 1897-1906 by the European engineer Mr. Minchin by the then Maharaja of Travancore during the Thirunal period. This dam fulfills the agricultural and drinking water needs of Kanyakumari and Tirunelveli district. The height of this dam was originally 42 feet, then in 1964 it was decided to add 6 more feet and in 1969 the height of the dam was 48 feet. The Pachiparai Dam, which was 42 feet, was raised to 48 feet. An additional 1 TMC of water is added after the dam is raised. The 42 feet Pachipara dam was raised to 48 feet by Kamaraj.

There is no permanent river or canal irrigation in Radhapuram taluk. Till now the situation is that the agricultural activities in the district can continue without interruption only if the wells are filled. Taking this into consideration, the Radhapuram Chittaru Pattanagalwai was constructed to benefit the farmers of Radhapuram taluk during Kamaraja's rule in order to improve agriculture.

The total capacity of these four dams namely Pachiparai (4350 M.Cft.), Perunchani (2890 M.Cft.)and Chittaru -I (393M.Cft.)and Chittaru- II (600M.Cft.) are 8233 million cubic feet. If these dams hold more than 1300 million cubic feet of water (16 percent water in the dams), the excess water will have to be released into the Radhapuram tributary to the Pattana Canal. Government Order No. 2584 dated 16-12-70 states this.

Through this, about 15 thousand 597 acres of land in Radhapuram taluk of Nellai district will be directly benefited. Indirectly 1013 acres of land is irrigated through 52 ponds, the required water for all 52 ponds can be filled with 420 M.Cft(0.4TMC) of water. Every year, the first day of july, water is released to the Perunchani Reservoir for irrigation purposes. Additionally, every year, 16th of july 150 cusecs (which is 13 M.Cft per day) water must be released to Radhapuram canal for irrigation purpose and drinking water purpose.

The catchment area of this dam includes the ghats of Panakudi, Kalakad of Tirunelvei dist. Its catchment area is 207.19 square kilometers and depth is 14.6 meters (48 feet). . The length of the dam is 425.5 meters and the height is 120.7 meters. A small temple has been built here at Pachiyamman Beil and worship of the deity is also taking place.

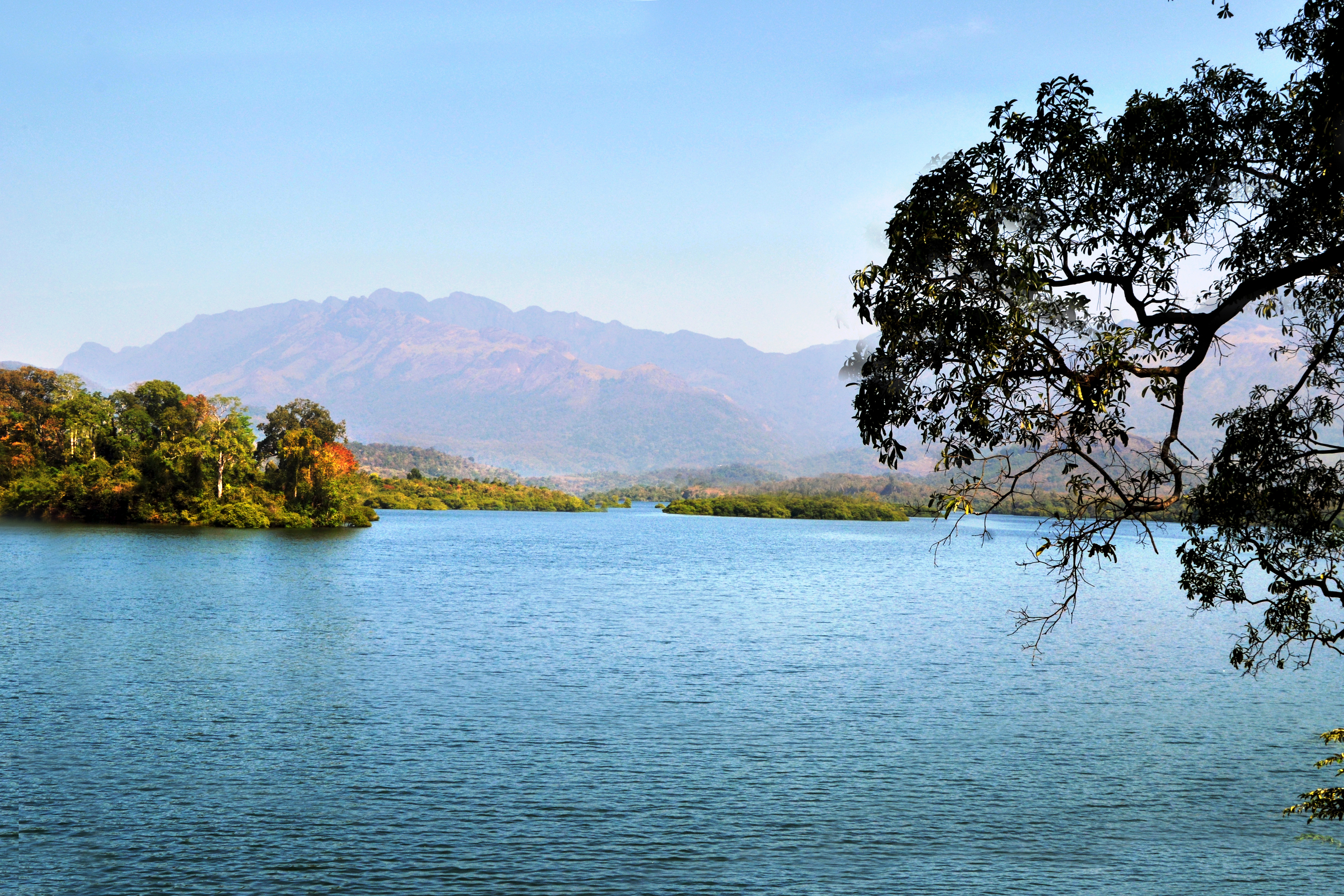
PECHIPARAI RESERVOIR, KANYAKUMARI DISTRICT
