= Christianity in Kanyakumari district =

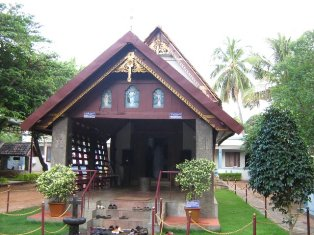
Thiruvithamcode Arappally under Malankara Orthodox Syrian Church is believed to be built by Thomas the Apostle

Christianity in Kanyakumari district is the largest religion in the district. The Catholic Church has about 500,000 followers, while the Protestant groups have about 400,000 members.

Christianity is said to date back to the 1st century CE. According to the tradition, St. Thomas, one of the twelve apostles, landed on the Malabar Coast (Kerala) in 52 CE and introduced Christianity. It is believed he built St. Mary's Church in Thiruvithamcode in 63 CE. During the colonial period Italian, British, Dutch and Portuguese Christians came to Tamil Nadu.

Population of Christians by census decade
| Year | Christian population | Total population | Percentage |
|---|---|---|---|
| 1961 | 367,808 | 996,915 | 36.89% |
| 1971 | 475,572 | 1,222,549 | 38.90% |
| 1981 | 551,908 | 1,423,399 | 38.77% |
| 1991 | 677,676 | 1,600,349 | 42.35% |
| 2001 | 745,406 | 1,676,034 | 44.47% |
| 2011 | 876,299 | 1,870,374 | 46.85% |

In 1961, Christians comprised nearly 37% of the population. In 2011, the Christian population of Kanyakumari is nearly 47% of the population.

== Denominations ==
The Roman Catholic Church (Latin Rite), the Church of South India, The London Mission Congregational Churches (L.M.S.), Assemblies of God in India, India Pentecostal Church of God, The Pentecostal Mission, The Salvation Army Church, the Syro-Malabar Catholic Church, the Jacobite Syrian Christian Church, the Syro-Malankara Catholic Church, the Malankara Orthodox Syrian Church, the Evangelical Church of India and other evangelical denominations are there. The Latin Rite of Roman Catholic Church (RC) is the oldest and the largest and has a homogeneous presence throughout the district. The second-largest church by number of members is the Church of South India (CSI) and third largest are Pentecostals.The vast majority are the members of Latin Rite Roman Catholic Church

=== Roman Catholic Church (RC) ===
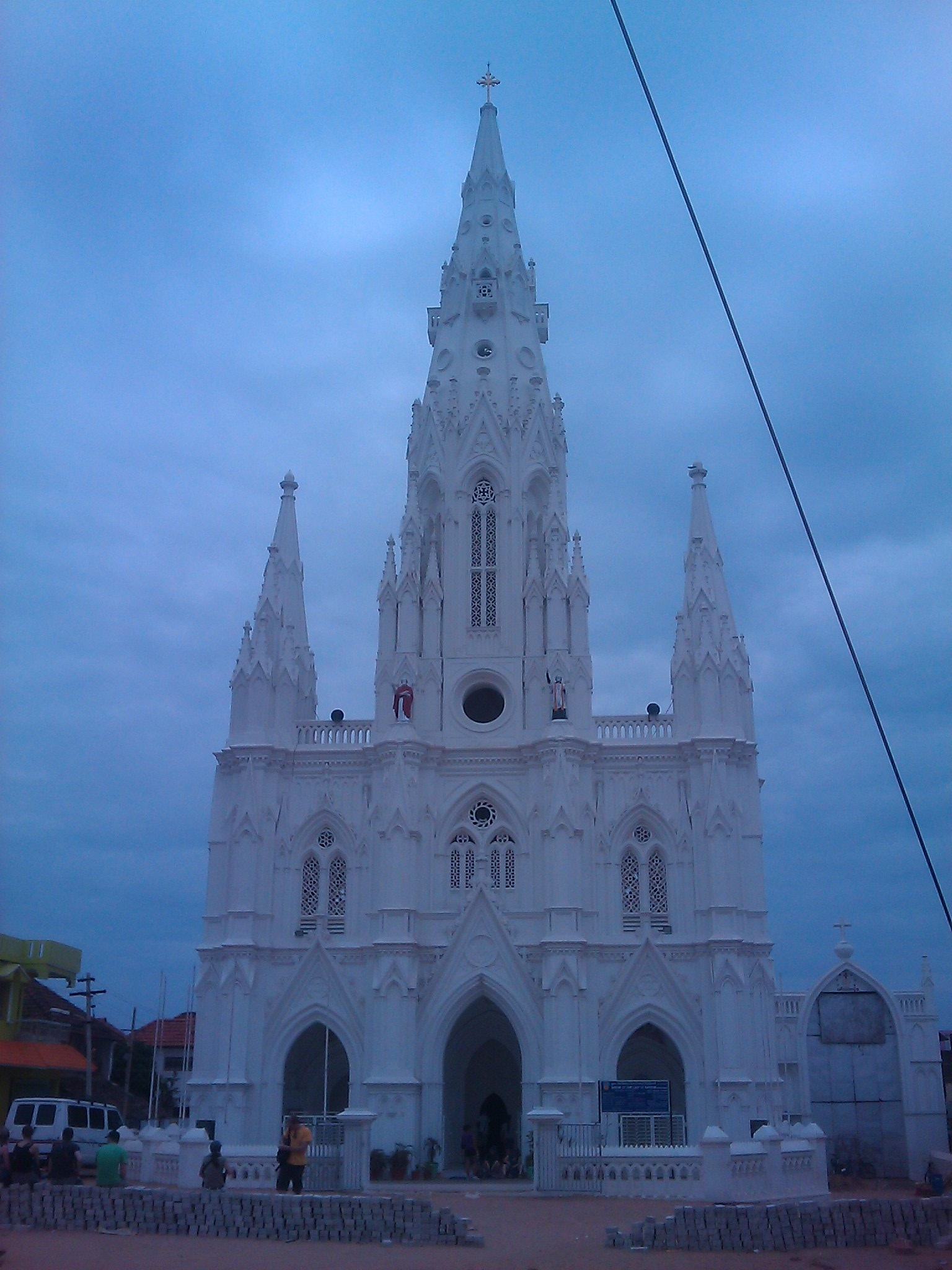
Our Lady of Ransom Church in Kanyakumari

In 1542, St. Francis Xavier came to Kanniyakumari District.During the 16th century, he converted thousands of Paravar fishermen between Ramanathapuram and Kanyakumari to Catholicism. Between 1543 and 1544 Francis established forty-five churches in the coastal areas of Travancore. one of the church he built is St. Francis Xavier's Cathedral, Kottar

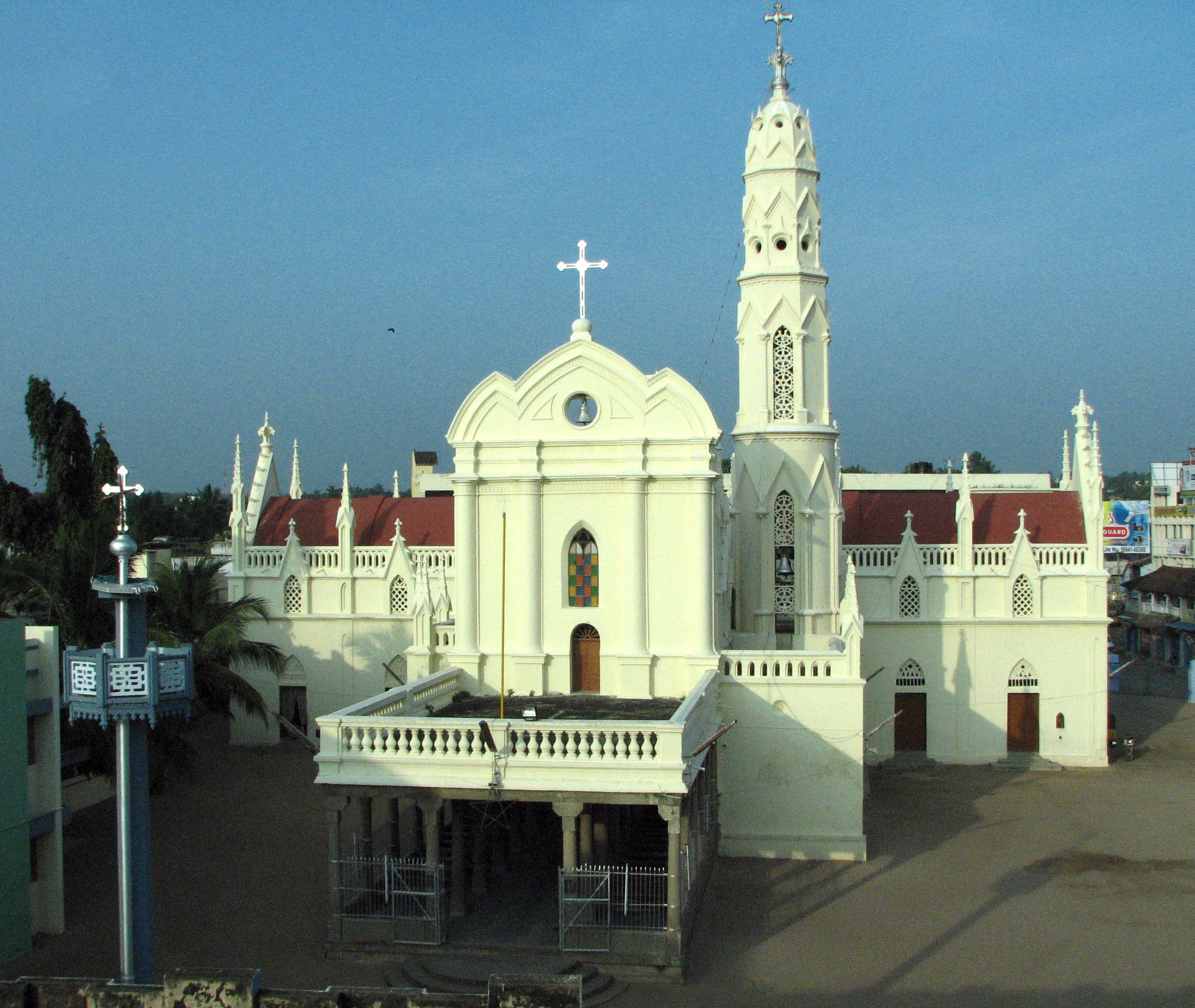
St. Xavier's Church, Kottar

=== Church of South India (CSI) ===
The British East India Company, helped Protestant churches to grow in the Kingdom of Travancore and Madras Presidency. Conversions took place in Kanyakumari and Tirunelveli from among the Nadar and Paraiyan communities by the work of the Church Missionary Society and London Missionary Society (L.M.S.). In 1818, 3000 members of the Nadar caste were said to have embraced Christianity.

During the 18th century, on the request of kholf iyer the German missionary William Tobias Ringeltaube came to Travancore (year 1806) and stayed in Mylaudy. Over a period of ten years, Ringeltaube succeeded in building his mission. The first church (CSI mylaudy) was built at Mylaudy in September 1809. Ringeltaube Vethamonikam Memorial Church, Mylaudy was the cathedral of Kanyakumari Diocese of Church of South India (CSI). Many schools were started along with the churches to educate the poor people. Even non-Christian students also received education. A printing press was started by his mission in 1821. Medical wing of the mission was established in 1838.

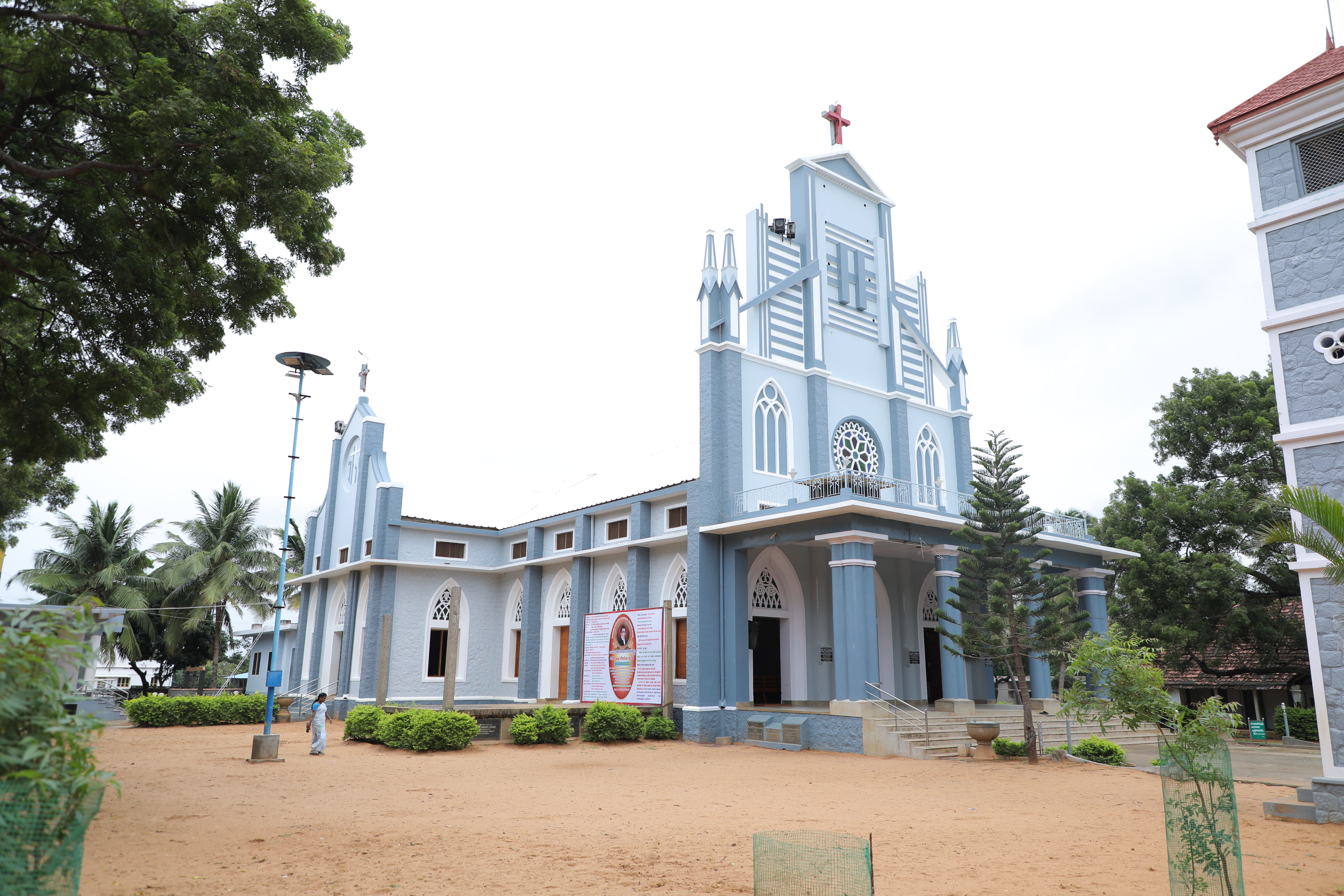
Ringeltaube Vethamonikam Memorial Church, Mylaudy

=== The Syro-Malabar Catholic Church ===
In 1996, the Syro-Malabar Catholic Church created its first `Diocese of Thuckalay`in Kanyakumari district, which was under the Syro-Malabar Catholic Archdiocese of Changanassery in Kerala until then.

=== The Syro-Malankara Catholic Church ===
The newly established Diocese of Marthandam split from the Syro-Malankara Archdiocese of Trivandrum in Kerala also in 1996.

=== Full Gospel Pentecostal Church ===
In 1933 the FULL Gospel Pentecostal Church was Created in Kadamalaikuntu near Mekkammandapam it is founded by Pr John Rose and it has 350+ Churches all over India. It Has various Dept like Youth etc Its Location in Kadamalaikuntu

=== Assemblies of God Church ===
In 1922 Mrs. Sheelal Manasseh pioneered Assemblies of GOD church was established in Melpuram which was part of then Travancore state by missionaries. It has been one of the early pioneering churches in the region.

=== Saron Bethel Deva Sabai ===
The Saron Bethel Deva Sabai was founded in 1979 by Rev D Samuel in Melpuram Kanyakumari District It has 10+ Local Church and Prayer House . It is a Pentecostal Christian Denomination in India. Its organisational headquarters located in Melpuram Location is SBDS Head Quarters

== Caste system ==
During the period of Kingdom of Travancore, the present day Kanyakumari district was under the control of the Kingdom. It was caste-based. Those who belonged to lower castes were denied education, choice of occupation and basic dignity. The women of the lower castes were not allowed to cover their breasts and they had to pay the mulakkaram (breast tax) to the king if they wanted to cover their breasts. The tax was amount depended on their breast size. A woman baring her chest to noble class was considered a sign of respect, by both males and females from the lower castes. Higher-class women covered both breasts and shoulders, whereas lower castes including Nadar and Ezhava women were not allowed to do so, to show their low status. Uneasy with their social status, many Nadars embraced Christianity, and started to wear long cloths. When many more Nadar women turned to Christianity, many Hindu Nadar women adopted the Nair breast cloth.

From 1813 to 1859 laws were enacted and repealed by the Kingdom regarding the upper cloth issue. During this period waves of violence and agitation continued between the higher and lower castes. Due to the rebellion of lower castes, in 1859 the kingdom permanently permitted lower caste women to wear garments on their torsos.

However, the claims of breast-taxes being levied in order to prevent lower-caste women from covering their breasts are hotly contested. Renowned Malayali historian Manu Pillai claims that the idea that it was meant to prevent them from covering their breasts is farfetched. Author Swati Gautam also cites in her article partisan and ideologically backed ideas of connecting apparent "Brahminical" ideas of violence to the tax, which was meant purely for differentiation between the sexes.

== Notable churches ==
- Curusadi St. Antony's Church
- Marthandam CSI Church
- Our Lady of Ransom Church, Kanyakumari
- Periyanayaki Shrine, Thiruvithancode
- St. Francis Xavier's Cathedral, Kottar
- St. Mary's Basilica, Mulagumoodu
- St. Sebastian Church, Madathattuvilai
- St. Antony's Church, Chemmanvilai
- St. Mary's Church, Thiruvithamcode
- Mylaudy CSI church

== See also ==
- Christianity in Tamil Nadu
- List of Christian denominations in India
