= Abbs =

Abbs is a surname. Notable people with the surname include:

- Annabel Abbs (born 1964), English author
- John Abbs (1810–1888), English missionary
- Louisa Sewell Abbs (1811–1872), English missionary
- Peter Abbs (1942–2020), English academic
- Tom Abbs (born 1972), American musician
- Walter Abbs, namesake of the Walter Abbs House

== See also ==
- Abbs (Yemen)
- Mount Abbs, mountain in Antarctica
- St. Abbs, village in Berwickshire, Scotland
- Acta Biochimica et Biophysica Sinica (ABBS)
- ABB (disambiguation)
- Abbs Valley
