= Ringeltaube Vethamonikam Memorial Church, Mylaudy =

CSI Mylaudy
- Cathedral of CSI Kanyakumari Diocese
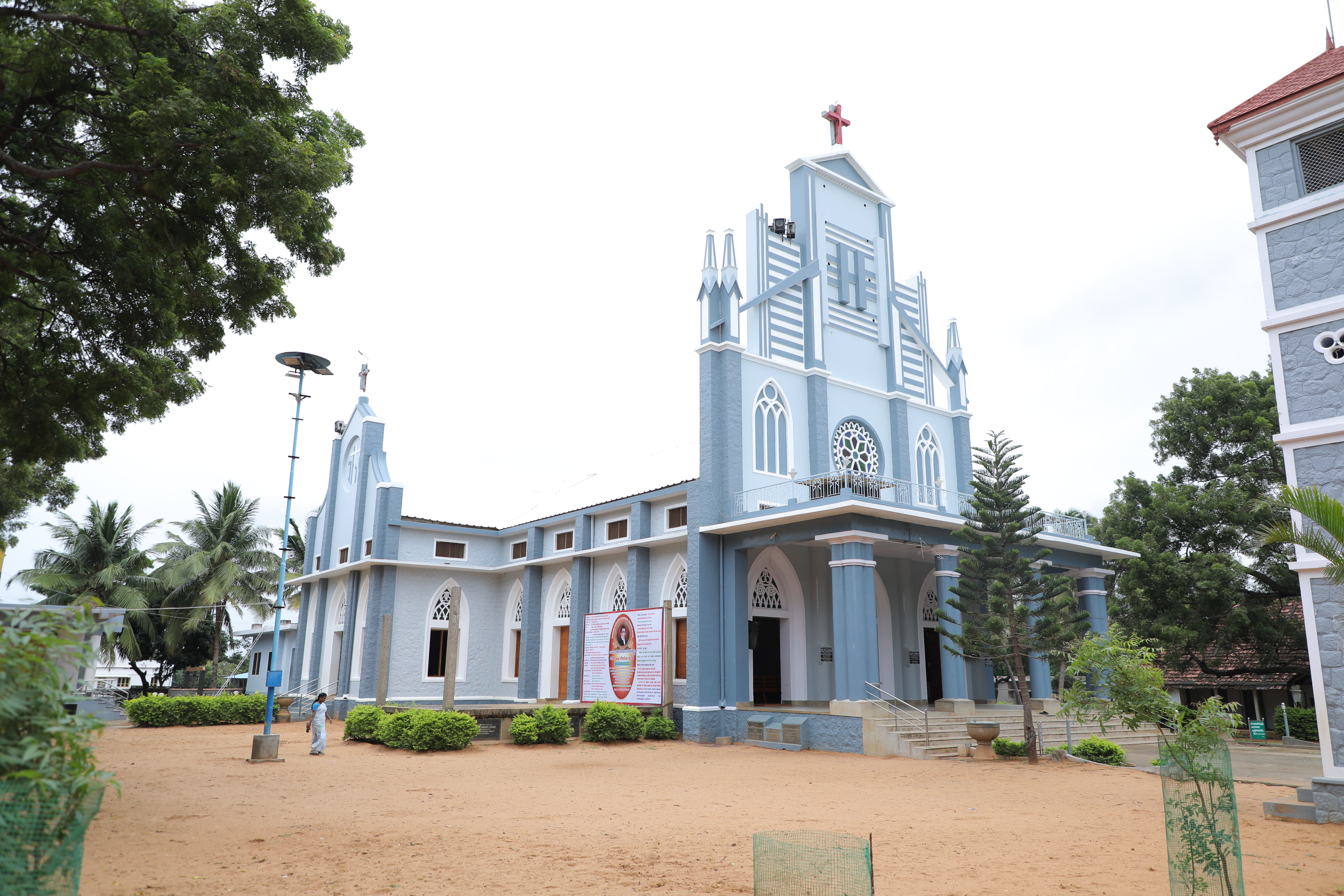
- Side view of Church
- CSI Mylaudy
- 8.1574°N 77.5034°E
- Location: Mylaudy, Tamil Nadu
- Country: India
- Denomination: Church of South India (CSI)
- Previous denomination: Church of England, Anglican
- Website: www.csimylaudy.com

History
- Status: Cathedral
- Founded: 1806; 220 years ago
- Founder(s): Rev. William Tobias Ringletaube, Vethamonikam Desikar, Masilamani (Sivaguru nathan)

Architecture
- Functional status: Active
- Architectural type: Cathedral
- Style: Gothic

Administration
- Province: Church of South India
- Diocese: Kanyakumari Diocese (former: South Travancore Diocese)

Clergy
- Bishop: Rt. Rev. Dr. S. Christopher Vijayan
- Priest: Rev. R.Christudhas
- Pastor: Rev. Jeslin stephen

Ringeltaube Vethamonikam Memorial Church, (Tamil: றிங்கல் தௌபே வேதமாணிக்கம் நினைவு தலைமை தேவாலயம், மயிலாடி) (Previously: Church of England and Anglican) is a cathedral located in Mylaudy, in the Kanyakumari district of Tamil Nadu, India. It is one of the oldest and largest churches in the region and serves as the cathedral of the Kanyakumari Diocese of the Church of South India (CSI). The church has a history of over 200 years.

On 1 May 1996, the church was designated as a district church. It was subsequently elevated to the status of cathedral on 25 April 2006, becoming the central church of the Kanyakumari Diocese (formerly South Travancore Diocese). The change in status was announced by Bishop John Gladstone, Moderator of the Church of South India, during the bicentenary observance of the church's establishment.

From the year 2006, the Mylaudy Church functions as the cathedral of the Kanyakumari Diocese.

On 8 August 2019, the Travancore Diocese marked the 250th birth anniversary of the German missionary Rev. William Tobias Ringeltaube, who played a key role in the church's early history.

On 29 January 2026, the mylaudy cathedral conducted special day program for the Hymn poet Masilamony anniversary 210 who worked for the growth of Tamil language by song

An annual commemoration, known as Ringeltaube Vethamonikam Memorial Day, is held on 25 April. Special prayer services are conducted at the Mylaudy Church by members of the Kanyakumari Diocese, South Kerala Diocese and Kollam-kottarakara Diocese ( previously: Travancore Diocese ) by each and every year.

== History ==
In the early 19th century, at the request of Kholf Iyer, German missionary William Tobias Ringeltaube—originally from Poland, then under Prussian control—arrived in the Travancore region. He studied the Tamil Language in Tanjore and began his missionary activities in South Travancore over a ten-year period. The first church at Mylaudy was constructed in September 1809. During this period, several other churches and schools were established by the mission. These schools provided education to both Christian and non-Christian students. In 1821, a printing press was set up, and in 1838, the mission's medical wing, which later became Neyyoor Medical College, was established.

In May 1809, Ringeltaube laid the foundation stone for the first Reformed Church in Mylaudy, considered the first Protestant church in South Travancore. Construction of the church was carried out by local residents, who worked at night after completing their daily duties. The building was completed within four months and was renovated in September of the same year. On the day of its completion, approximately 40 individuals were baptised by Rev. Ringeltaube. The original structure measured 40 feet in length and 12 feet in width and stood on the site of the current church.

As the Christian community grew, the church underwent expansion. Due to spatial limitations, the original structure was eventually demolished and a new church was constructed on the same site.

Later, the rear section of the church was extended in the shape of a cross during the tenure of Pastor E. E. Gnanadasan, father of Bishop I.R.H. Gnanadason. The expanded church was inaugurated and blessed by Pastor John A. Jacob on 17 December 1932.

Due to further space constraints, the community resolved to construct a new church. On 13 May 1966, Bishop I. R. H. Gnanadason laid the foundation stone for a cruciform (cross-shaped) structure. The new church, which took over 25 years to complete with the support of various donors and the efforts of the Mylaudy congregation, measures 120 feet in length and 45 feet in width, with each arm of the cross measuring 33 feet long and 19 feet wide. It was formally inaugurated on 27 September 1991, by Bishop G. Christhudhas of the Kanyakumari Diocese.

== School ==
In 1809, the first English-medium school in South Travancore was established by Ringeltaube, which is approximately 700 feet east of the church at Mylaudy. A few years later, this school shifted to Vadaseri, but it was destroyed a few years later. It was the foundation for later schools and colleges, Ringletaube Higher Secondary school and Scott Christian College.

== The South Travancore London Missionary Society (LMS) ==
The headquarters of the London Missionary Society (LMS) in South Travancore were also located in Mylaudy. The mission was established by the presence of Ringeltaube. On 21 September 1845, the 50th anniversary of the London Missionary Society was commemorated at Mylaudy.

== Gallery ==
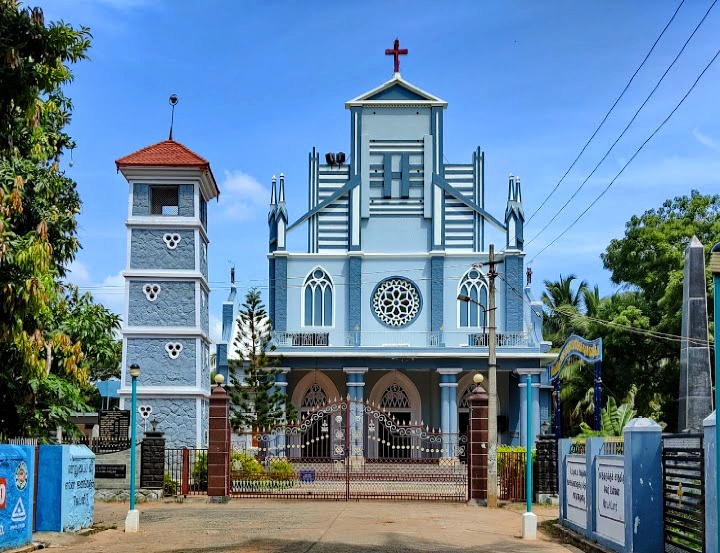
Front view of present church

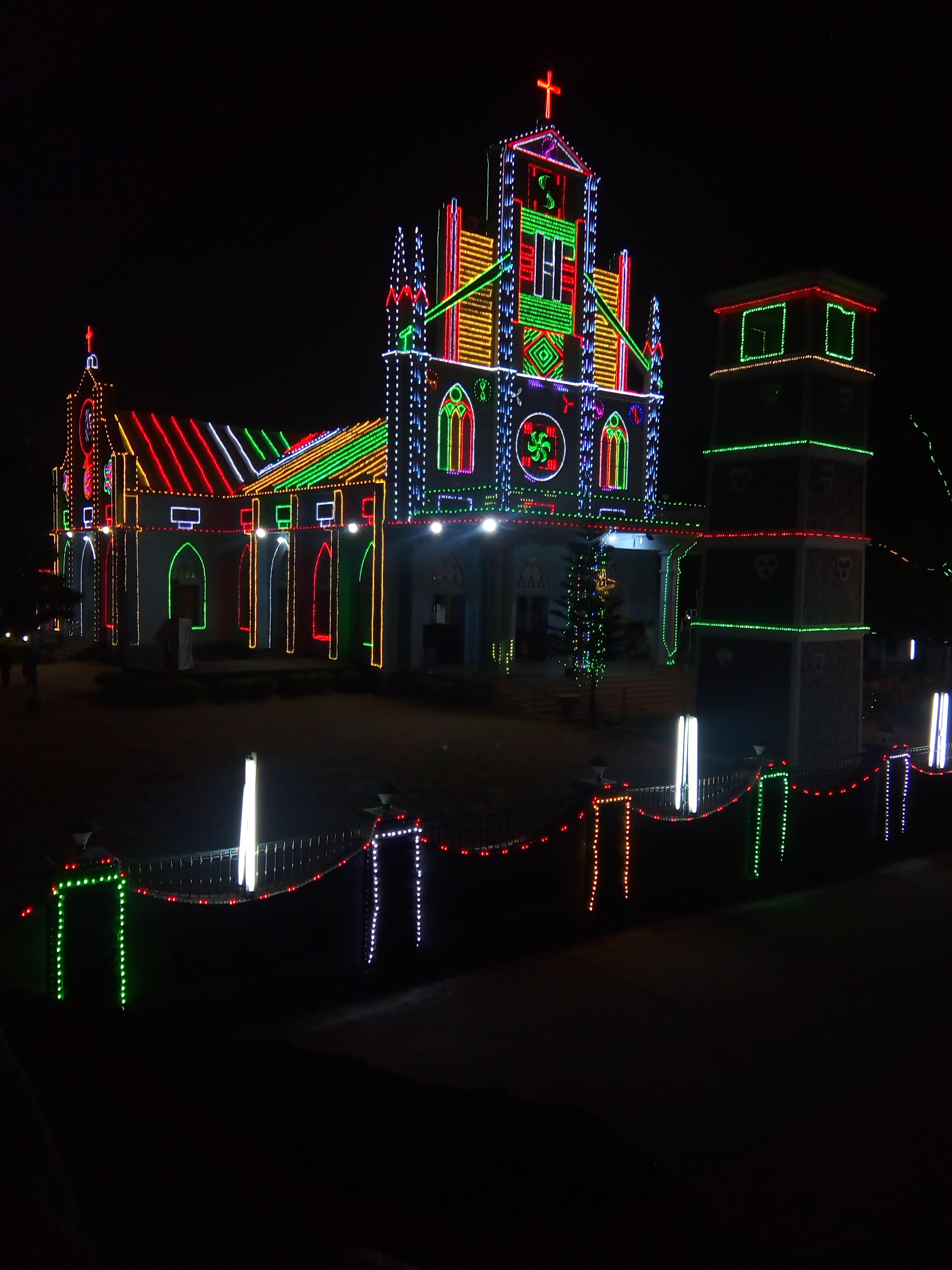
Church decorated by lights (christmas festival)

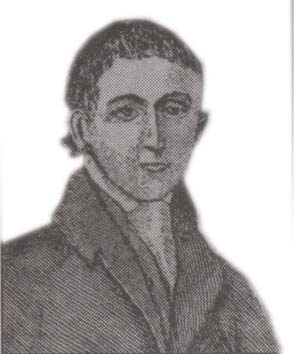
Rev. William Tobias Ringeltaube

The place where the Ringletaube missionary preach gospel

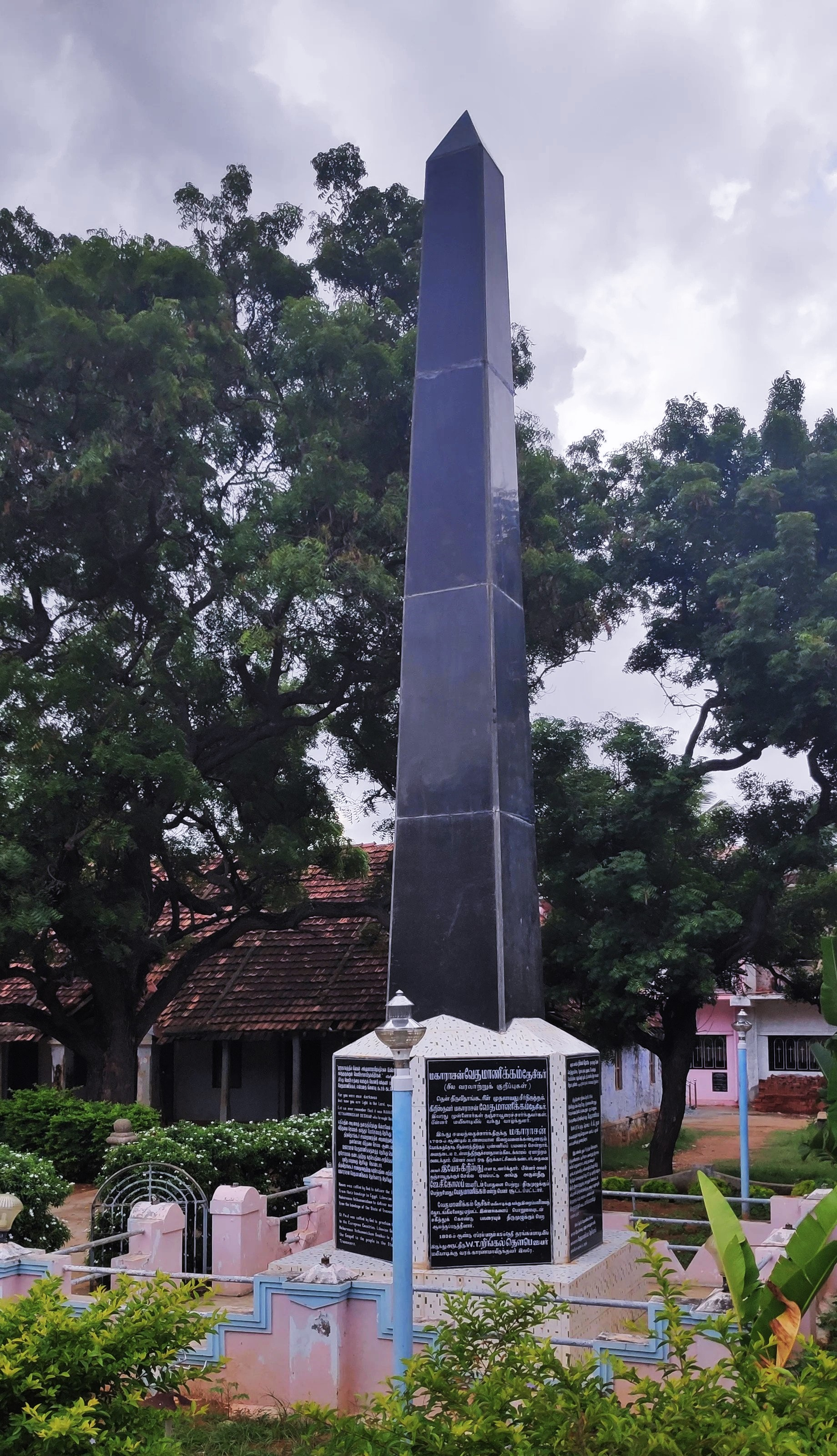
History Pillar of Mylaudy Church

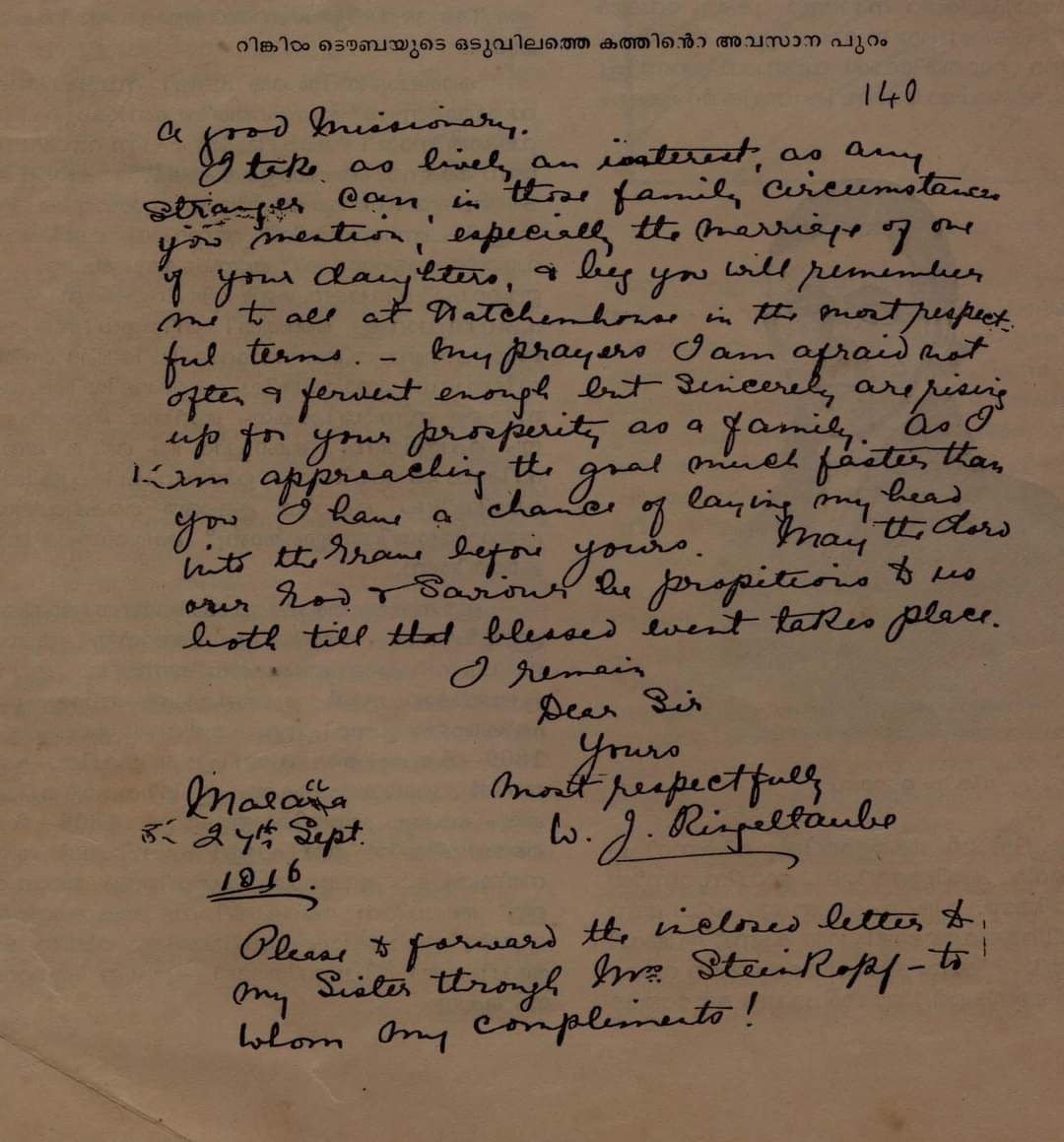
Possibly the last letter of Rev. Ringeltaube to someone, asking to forward enclosed letter to his sister and engaged wife (Dated on 24 September 1816, from Malacca) ( this letter explains As I am approaching the goal much faster than you, I have a chance of laying my head into the grave before yours. May the Lord, our dear Saviour, be propitious to us both till the blessed event takes place.)

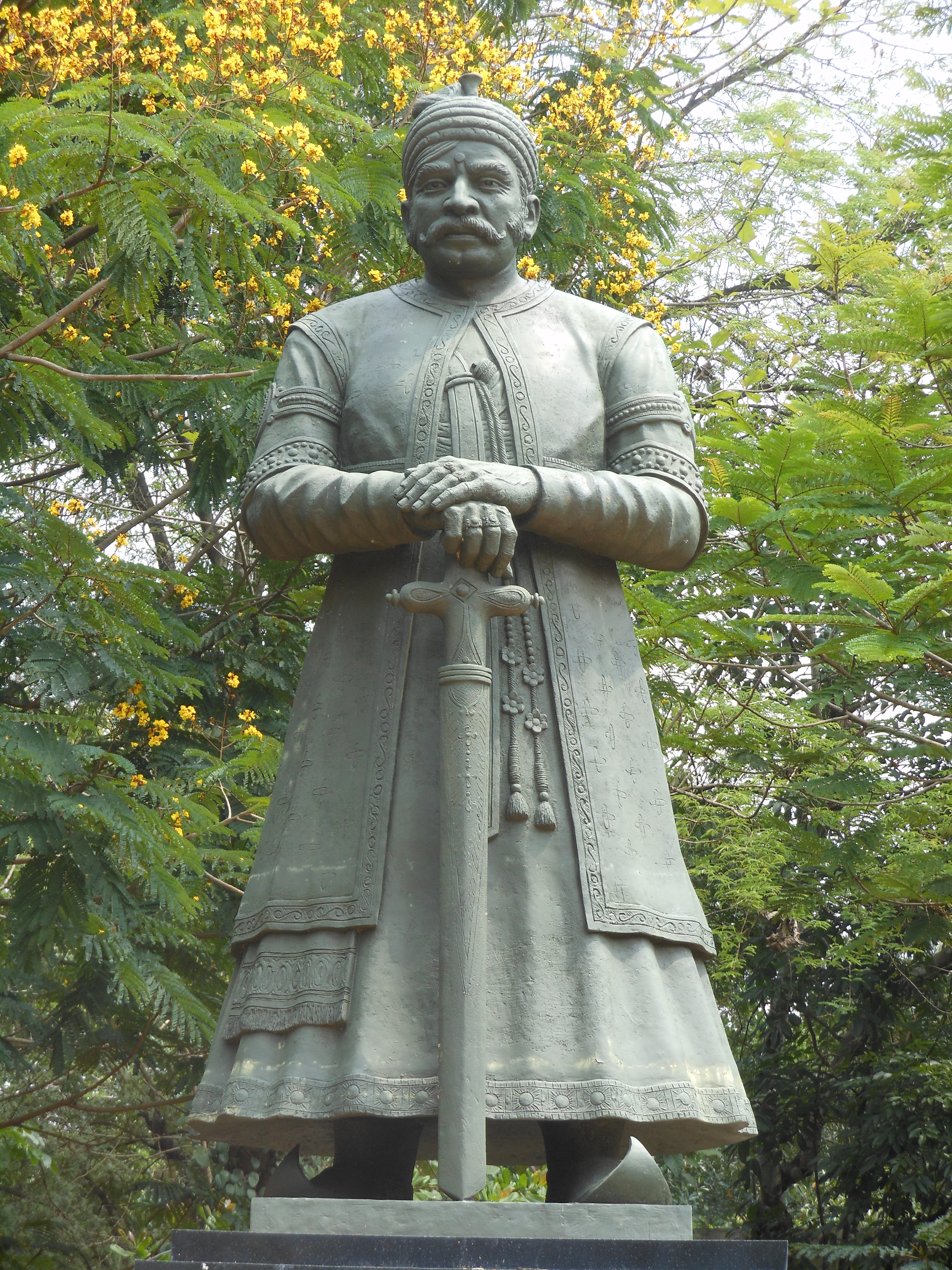
Diwan Veluthampi, Thalakkulam, Kanyakumari district

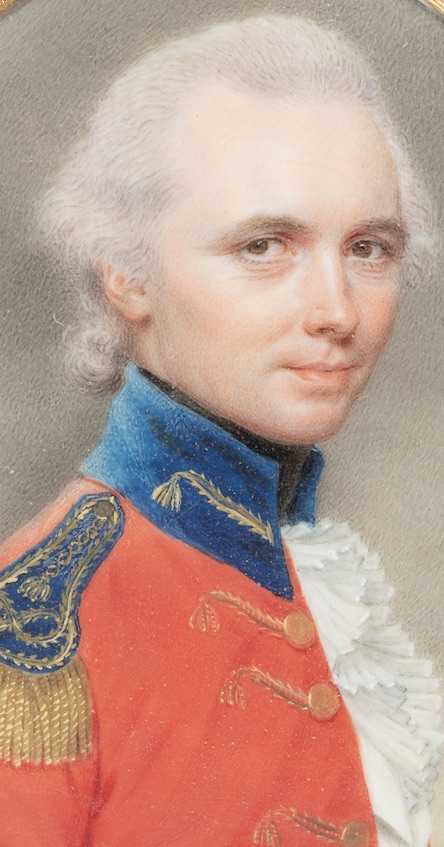
Colin Macaulay

Mylaudy CSI Church Museum (History of South travancore Christian Mission)

Couch that used by Rev. W. T. Ringeltaube, (now at Mylaudy Church Museum)

Antique wooden Sofa Chair that used by Rev. W. T. Ringeltaube, (now at Mylaudy Church Museum)

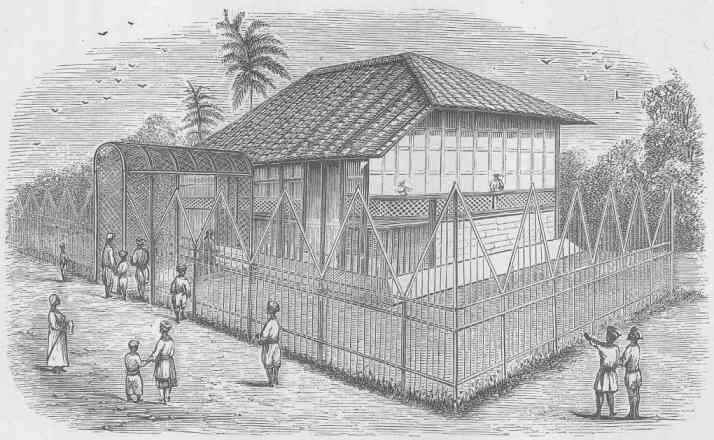
Granary / Ricebarn in mylaudy at 1819

== Timeline 1799-1827 (Legacy) ==
- In 1799, A man named Maharasan undertook a pilgrimage to the Chidambaram Nataraja Temple on foot, accompanied by his nephew Sivagurunathan (his elder brother's son). Due to physical and mental exhaustion, they spent the night in the outer precincts of the temple. That night, Maharasan reportedly had a dream in which an elderly man told him, "Everyone who comes here deserves immeasurable punishment. Even if you come here, I will rebuke you and forgive your guilt. So, go back the way you came, without delay, and I will show you the right path. "
- Following this experience,both of them left Chidambaram and proceeded to Thanjavur, where they met some Christian relatives. They reached Tanjore at sunday morning. Both of them stand before the entrance of the church in Tanjore (St. Peter's Garden chapel).
- The priest Kohlhoff call them why you are standing outside? come inside (they saw all are sitting equally without any caste difference)
- These relatives introduced them to Rev. John Caspar Kohlhoff. After hearing Rev. Kohlhoff's sermons, both men reportedly repented and embraced Christianity. They remained in Thanjavur to learn more about the Christian faith. Rev. Kohlhoff taught them about the teachings of Jesus Christ and gave them a copy of the Book of Wisdom and basic law books.
- In 1801, Maharasan and Sivagurunathan were baptised at St. Peter's Church in Thanjavur by Rev. Kohlhoff. They adopted new names upon their baptism —Maharasan became Vethamonikam and Sivagurunathan became Masilamani.
- Meanwhile, members of Maharasan's family, known as the Desikar family, assumed both men had died during the pilgrimage, as they had not returned within the expected timeframe.
- Several months later, Vethamonikam desikar and Masilamani returned to their hometown of Mylaudy, carrying copies of the Bible, books, and tracts. Their family was reportedly shocked by their reappearance. The two men shared their experiences from Thanjavur and began teaching Biblical principles. They distributed Bibles to those who accepted Christianity.
- On the 20th of April, 1804, the missionaries for India and Ceylon, Messrs (Srilanka). Ringeltaube, Desgranges, Cran, Vos, Erhardt, and Palm sailed from Copenhagen for Tranquebar (Tharangambadi) the Danish ship King's Packet, the only means of communication with India then open to missionaries. Rev. William Tobias Ringeltaube arrived in Tranquebar (Tharangambadi) on 4 December 1804 and spent a nearly 2 years learning the Tamil language.
- In 1805, Vethamonikam desikar returned to Thanjavur to meet Rev. Kohlhoff and reported the growth of Christianity in Mylaudy. He also requested a missionary to lead the Christian community there. In response, Rev. Kohlhoff introduced him to Rev. William Tobias Ringeltaube. Vethamonikam extended an invitation to Ringeltaube to come to Mylaudy. At that time, Ringeltaube was studying Tamil in Thanjavur.
- Rev. William Tobias Ringeltaube arrived in Mylaudy on 25 April 1806. In May 1809, he laid the foundation stone for the first Protestant church in South Travancore, which was dedicated in September of the same year.
- In 1809 and 1810, Ringeltaube and Vethamonikam jointly established the first English-medium school and a first-aid centre in Mylaudy. They also set up the regional headquarters of the London Missionary Society (LMS) in the town.
- Between 1810-1816, Ringeltaube established seven branch churches, orphanages, and schools in South Thamaraikulam, Eathamozhi, Puthalam, Koilvilai, Jamestown, Zionpuram, Perinbapuram, and Ananthanadarkudy.
- In 1813, during a period of poverty in Mylaudy and surrounding areas, Ringeltaube reportedly supported the local population by offering financial aid and commissioning public works. These included the construction of a well (located: south of the church) and the digging of a pond (once located near the Ringeltaube Higher Secondary School, but now no longer in existence).
- On 23 January 1816, Ringeltaube expressed his desire to return to his homeland to his congregation members. He handed over all the responsibility to Vedamonikam, who ran the mission for the next two years. On 5 February 1816, Ringeltaube sailed from Kollam to Chennai. When the ship arrived at Manakudi, he remembered the debt he had written on the wall of his house. He asked the sailor to stop the ship and he travelled to Mylaudy where he destroyed the debt account. Afterwards, he again sailed to Chennai. He then travelled from Chennai to Sri Lanka and then to Malacca and then to Batavia on September 27, 1816.
- In year 1816, Backiya wanz marriage was planned to conduct in mylaudy church. During the wedding march the upper caste people stopped it and not allowed to enter the Church. People are struggled against the caste system and to get the permission against the caste system and get the order "Every one in India are indian, they have rights to walk in any road, maintain equality".
- In September 1817, Rev. Charles Mead and his wife Anne Hunt undertook a voyage to the Malabar coast enroute to Travancore, via Penang, Malaysia. Anne Hunt suffered lung disease. Both of them suffered lot and mead's wife died on October 26, 1817, leaving behind a seven-month-old son "John Hunt". On 17 January 1818, Rev. Charles Mead arrived at Colachel, kanyakumari. with his son, John Hunt. and travelled to Mylaudy the same day.
- In 1818, he built a large barn on the southern side of the Mylaudy Church to store paddy collected from the mission fields. The barn measured 38 feet in length, 18 feet in width, and 36 feet in height, and could store up to 1,500 kottai (a traditional measure; 1 kottai = 21 marakkal, 1 marakkal ≈ 3 kg). The barn was later destroyed.
- Vethamonikam and Masilamani both died on the same day, 27 January 1827, and were buried in Mylaudy.
- After the ringletaube and vethamonikam desikar, Charles Mead and Richard Knill continued the mission. Mead extended Ringeltaube's educational work and established the LMS Seminary at Nagercoil, as well as the LMS Press. The LMS press was one of a kind in Travancore, capturing the king's attention who in turn invited missionaries to establish a government press. Charles and Johanna Mead. served in Travancore for 56 years,opening churches and schools throughout the area.

== Cathedral organisation ==
Mylaudy Cathedral has a well-knit structural organisation for management. The trustees include senior members of the cathedral appointed by the Bishop of Kanyakumari. The trustees look after the assets of the cathedral. The Pastorate Committee consists of 11 elected members including the secretary, Accountant and Treasurer (Assistant Accountant). At least 1 Women and youth are represented. Other important church members are the lay leaders, choir with leader and organist, music director of the men's chorus, superintendent of Sunday school, Endeavours, children ministry, youth clubs, YMCA organization, female and Male christ community clubs, Nursery school

The cathedral management works under the leadership of the presbyter and associate presbyter. It is an elective, democratic system and everyone has her part to play.

== Priest who served in Mylaudy Cathedral ==
1. Rev. Nesamony (1916 - 1922)
2. Rev. E. Gnanadhasan (father of Kanyakumari Diocese bishop I.R.H. Gnanadason) (17-12-1923 to Nov. 1950 (27 year's))
3. Evg. Chinnakan (1951
4. Evg. Mochakan
5. Evg. Perinba Dhas
6. Rev. Ponniah (1958)
7. Rev. J. Eliezer (1959 - 1964)
8. Evg. A. Arul Thambi Harris (1964 - 1966)
9. Rev. Raja Muthu (1966)
10. Rev. Vethamonikam (1966 -1969)
11. Rev. J. Eliezer (1969 - 1974)
12. Rev. M. Rajayan (1974 - 1976)
13. Rev. Y. Jacob (1976 - 1979)
14. Rev. Masilamani (1979 - 1980)
15. Rev. E. Sukumar Jebasingh (1980 - 1982)
16. Rev. N. Abraham Lincoln (1982 - 1983)
17. Rev. C.I. Paul Immanuel (1983 - 1985)
18. Rev. I. Yacobu (1985 - 1988)
19. Rev. Samuel christhu Dhas (1988 - 1989)
20. Rev. C. Devadhas (1989 - 1991)
21. Rev. T.R. Robertson (1991 - 1995)

Mylaudy District chairman

1. Rev. I.P. James Nathaniyel (from 01-05-1996 - 1999)
2. Rev. D. Rethinaraj (1999 - 2003)
3. Rev. A. William Thomas (2003 - 2008)
4. Rev. Gnana Dhas (2008-2011)
5. Rev. M. Moses Sam Raj (2011-2014)
6. Rev. Gnana sigamony (2014-2019)
7. Rev. Selvaraj (2019-2023)
8. Rev. R. christhu dhas (from 2023)

Assistant to District chairman

1. Mr. P. Wilson packiya Moni (2008-2013)
2. Rev. Yesu Renny Bell (2013-2016)
3. Rev. N. Smily Nimmy Anand (2016-2017)
4. Rev. Paul wiser Shelly (2017-2018)
5. Evg. G.Yobu (2018-2022)
6. Rev. A. Hendry Bright Singh (2022-2023)
7. Rev. A. Abraham Justin Kumar (2023-2025)
8. Rev. M. Jeslin stephen (from 2025)

Before 1916 is under excavation
