= CSI Home Church, Nagercoil =

CSI Home Church
- Home Church
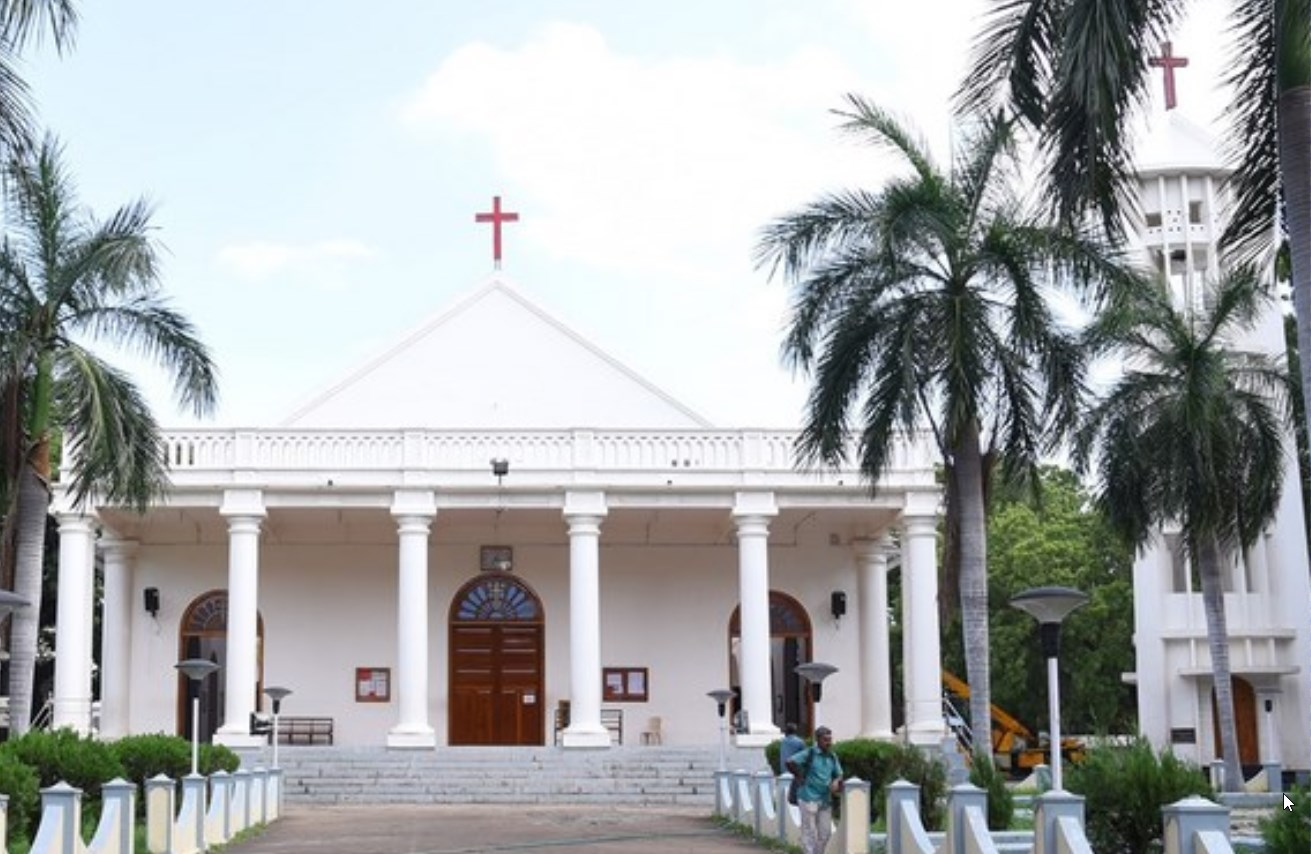
- Home Church in 2020
- CSI Home Church
- Location: Nagercoil, Tamil Nadu, India
- Country: India
- Denomination: Church of South India
- Previous denomination: London Missionary Society
- Website: http://Nargercoilhomechurch.com/

History
- Status: District Church
- Founded: 2 March 1819
- Founder: Rev. Charles Mead

Architecture
- Functional status: Active
- Heritage designation: India
- Architect: Rev. Charles Mead
- Architectural type: Greek style
- Groundbreaking: January 1, 1819

Administration
- Diocese: CSI Kanyakumari diocese

Clergy
- Bishop: Rt.Rev.Dr.S.Christopher Vijayan

CSI Home Church is one of the largest and oldest churches in Asia. In 1809, the Christian mission established at Mylaudy by Rev. William Tobias Ringeltaube. The Foundation stone for this church was laid on January 1, 1818 by Rev. Richard Knill and the construction progressed in the later years aided by the arrival of Rev. Charles Mault in 1821. The land on which the church was built was donated by the then British Travancore resident, General John Munro, 9th of Teaninich, who had acted as a catalyst between the Missionary and the government of Madras and the Kingdom of Travancore. This helped in the Theological Education for about two Centuries. The church hosted the wedding of linguistic scholar Robert Caldwell in 1844. He died 28 August 1891, and was buried in Tirunelveli.

== Architecture ==
The building is in Greek style is 140 ft × 70 ft (43 m × 21 m). This is one of the oldest and biggest of the Protestant churches in South India. The edifice can provide accommodation for nearly 2500 people at a time.

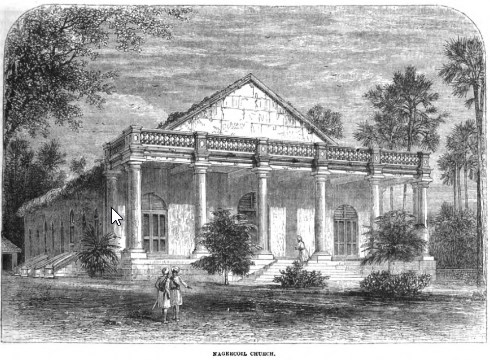
Engraving from the magazine, Sunday at Home, dated 1872

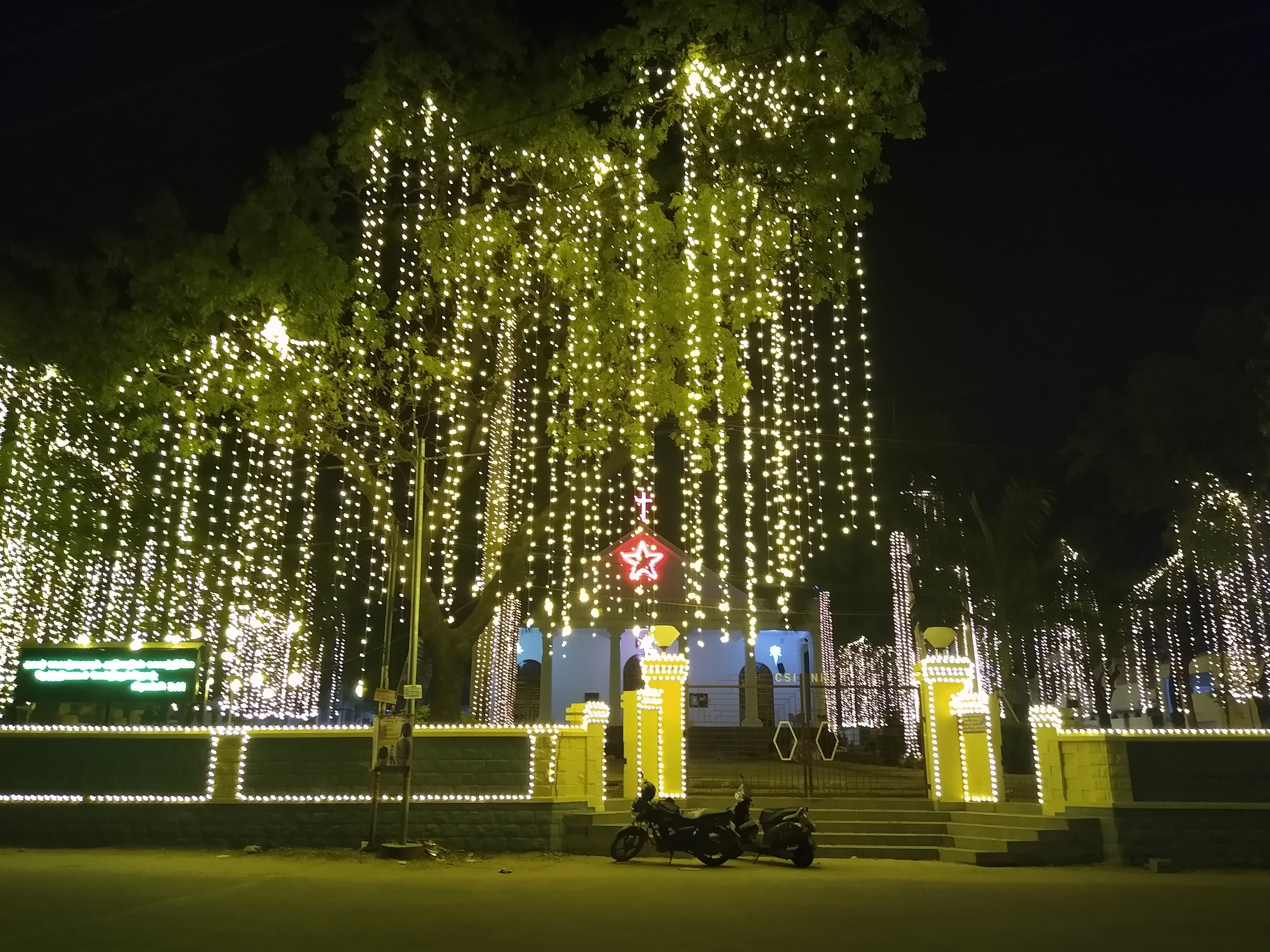
Church building with light decoration for Christmas celebrations, 2021
