= Diocese of Kanyakumari of the Church of South India =

Diocese of the Church of South India in Tamil Nadu, India

CSI Diocese of Kanyakumari
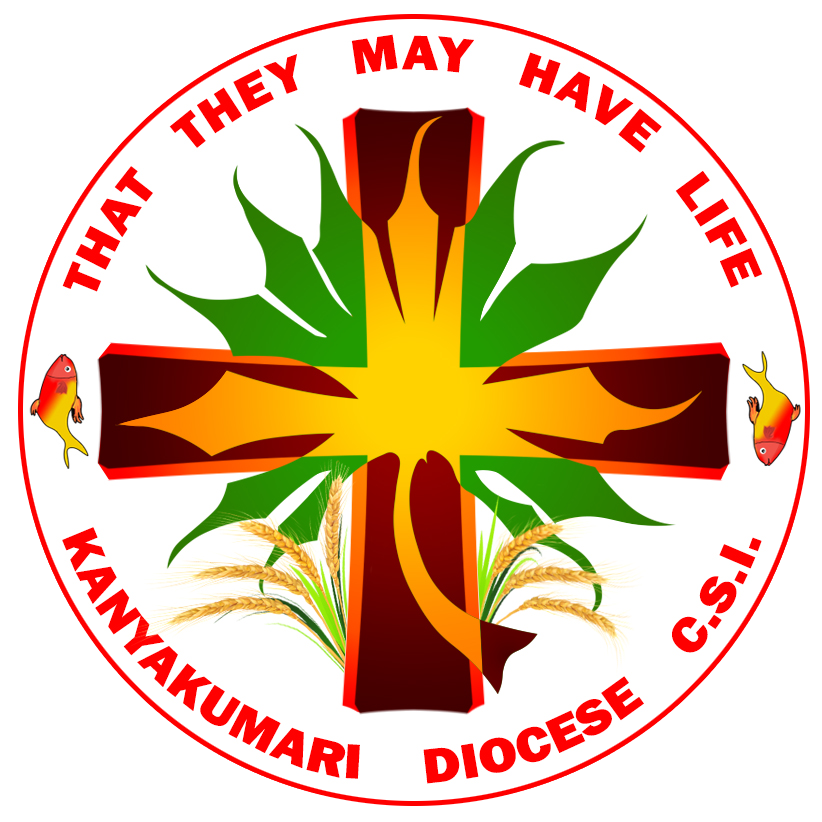

Location
- Country: India
- Ecclesiastical province: Church of South India
- Headquarters: Diocesan Office, Nagercoil

Statistics
- Congregations: 562

Information
- Established: June 2, 1959
- Cathedral: CSI Mylaudy
- Language: Tamil, English, Malayalam

Current leadership
- Bishop: Rt. Rev. Dr. S. Christopher Vijayan, Secretary (ER. Biju Nizeth Paul); vice chairman (Rev. Muthusamy christdhas); Treasurer (Dr. Jayahar Joseph)

Map
- CSI Kanyakumari Diocese

Website
- kanyakumari.csi1947.com

Kanyakumari Diocese is one of the 24 dioceses under the Church of South India, a United Protestant denomination. which consists of CSI churches in Kanyakumari District. The diocese was constituted on 2 June 1959. Anglican diocese established in 1879, later becoming part of the Church of South India (CSI). The South Travancore Diocese was bifurcated into the Kanyakumari Diocese and the South Kerala Diocese in 1959, Arnold Legg who was the Bishop of South Travancore Diocese since 1937, continued to serve as the Bishop of South Kerala Diocese. I.R.H. Gnanadason was the first Bishop of the Kanyakumari Diocese.

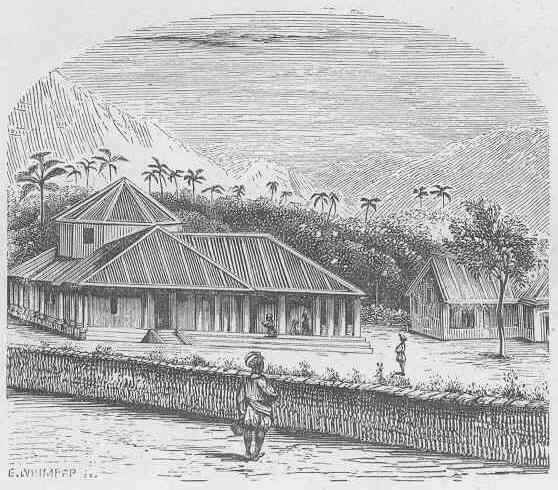
London Mission Nagercoil Seminary (London Missionary Society, 1869, p.15)

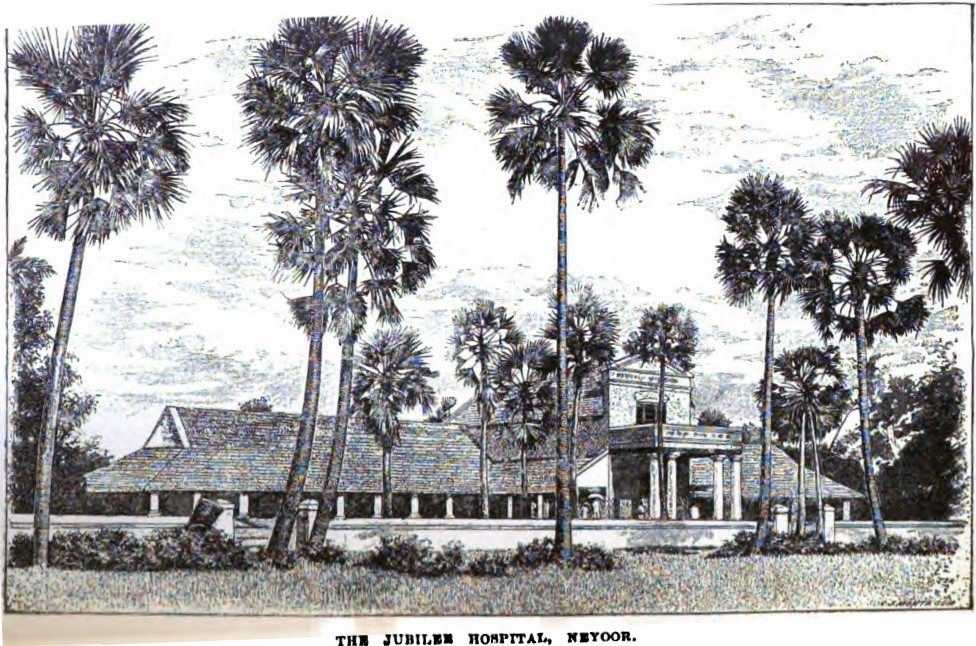
The Jubilee Hospital, Neyoor (p.322, 1891), London Missionary Society

== South Travancore Diocese ==
In the year 1947, union of a number of Protestant denominations in South India that occurred after the independence of India. United Church joined with the Anglican and Methodist Churches to form the Church of South India (CSI).

The last LMS missionary was Rt. Rev. A. H. Legg. After the End of LMS, The Rt. Rev. A. H. Legg was consecrated on 27 September 1947 and installed as the first Bishop of the South Travancore Diocese on 13 October 1947. The present Kanyakumari district was historically part of the erstwhile Travancore State. Kanyakumari district Tamil speaking was transferred to Madras State on 1 November 1956. Due to that, The South Travancore Diocese was bifurcated into the Kanyakumari Diocese (Tamil Nadu) and the south Kerala Diocese (Kerala) in 1959.

== Missionaries ==
- Rev. William Tobias Ringeltaube ( first missionary)
- Vethamonikam desikar (first Christian)
- Rev. Charles Mead ( father of Nagercoil mission)
- Rev. Charles Mault (Father of Travancore printing press)
- Rev. Dr. James Duthie (female mission growth)
- Dr. Theodore Howard Somervel (Karakonam medical mission)
- Rev. John Abbs (lace-making and embroidery to local girls)
- Rev. Sinclair (Marthandam mission)
- Scott wilmott (Growth of Scott school)
- Richard kniel (CMS Mission)

== Bishops of the diocese ==
=== Travancore diocese ===
- Arnold Legg (27 September 1947 - until 19 November 1959)

=== Kanyakumari diocese ===
1. I.R.H. Gnanadason (19.11.1959 – 05.05.1973) (Kanyakumari Diocese consecrated on 19 December 1959)
2. C. Selvamony (06.05.1973 – 20.01.1980)
3. G. Christhudhas (01.05.1980 – 07.01.1997)
4. M. I. Kesari (03.02.1997 – 10.09.2000)
5. G. Devakadasham (2001 – 2019)
6. Anantha Rayappan Chelliah (07.07.2019 – 07.07.2025)
7. S. Christopher Vijayan from (07.12.2025)

== Institutions under Kanyakumari Diocese ==
=== School's ===
Higher Secondary Schools

- Ringletaube Higher Secondary School, Mylaudy
- Scott Christian Higher Secondary School for Boys, Nagercoil
- Duthie Higher Secondary School for Girls, Nagercoil
- Home church girls Higher Secondary School, Nagercoil
- C.S.I. Higher Secondary School for Girls, Neyyoor
- C.S.I. Higher Secondary School for Girls, Marthandam
- C.S.I. Higher Secondary School for Boys, Marthandam
- C.S.I. Higher Secondary School, Mathicode
- L.M.S. Higher Secondary School, James town
- L.M.S. Higher Secondary School, Christucoil, Palliyadi
- C.S.I. Higher Secondary School, Kadamalaikuntu
- C.S.I. Higher Secondary School, Zionpuram
- L.M.S. Higher Secondary School, South Thamaraikulam
- C.S.I. V.V. Higher Secondary School, Irenepuram
- C.S.I. Higher Secondary School, Venkanji
- Hacker Memorial Higher Secondary School, Neyyoor

Matriculation School

- C.S.I. Matriculation Higher Secondary School, Nagercoil

High Schools

- C.S.I. High School for Girls, Santhapuram
- C.S.I. V. V. High School for Girls, Irenepuram

Middle Schools

- Middle School, Kannangulam
- Middle School, Levinchipuram
- Middle School, Eathamozhi
- Middle School, Corrimony

Primary School

- L.M.S. Primary School, Christucoil, Palliyadi
- Duthie Tamil Primary School, Nagercoil
- Duthie Tamil Nursery School, Nagercoil
- Morton (Scott) English Primary School, Nagercoil
- C.S.I. Christ Tamil Primary School, Kamarajapuram
- Sishu Bhavan, Nagercoil

Special School

- C.S.I. School for the Deaf, Kottaram
- School for the Visually Handicapped, Irenepuram
- Bishop Gnanadason Arivu Illam, Kotticode at Chithiramcode.
- C.S.I. School for Mentally Retarded, Alancode

=== College's ===
Arts College

- Scott Christian College, Nagercoil
- Nesamony Memorial Christian College, Marthandam
- Women's Christian College, Nagercoil
- Christian College of Education, Marthandam
- C.S.I. College of Physical Education, Scott College Campus, Nagercoil

Teacher's Training Institute

- C.S.I. Teacher's Training Institute, Irenepuram

Polytechnic College & I.T.I

- Moderator Gnanadason Polytechnic College, Nagercoil
- C.S.I. Vethamonickam Memorial CSI Polytechnic College, Viricode, Marthandam
- C.S.I. Motor Mechanic Training Centre, Nagercoil
- C.S.I. I.T.I., Kaliyakkavilai

College of Nursing & Physiotheraphy

- C.S.I. School of Nursing, Neyyoor
- C.S.I. School of Nursing, Marthandam
- C.S.I. Christian College of Nursing, Neyyoor
- C.S.I. Christian College of Nursing, Marthandam
- C.S.I. Christian College Of Physiotherapy, Colachel
- C.S.I. College of Nursing, Vadaseri, Nagercoil

Engineering College

- CSI Institute of Technology, Thovalai

=== Hospitals ===
- C.S.I. Mission Hospital, Nagercoil
- C.S.I. Mission Hospital, Marthandam
- C.S.I. Medical Mission Hospital, Neyyoor
- International Cancer Centre, Neyyoor (Neyyoor Cancer Hospital)
- C.S.I. Mission Hospital, Karungal
- C.S.I. Mission Hospital, Kulasekharam
- C.P.M. Leprosy Hospital, Udayarvilai, Colachel

=== Lace Industries ===
- C.S.I. Lace & Embroidery Industry, Nagercoil
- C.S.I. Embroidery Industry, Neyyoor
- C.S.I. Embroidery Industry, Marthandam

=== Theological seminary ===
- Kanyakumari Theological seminary college, Muttom, kanyakumari.

== See also ==
- Christianity in India
- Church of South India
- Church of North India
- Christianity in Tamil Nadu
- Christianity in Kanyakumari district
- Christianity in Kerala
- South Kerala Diocese
- Kollam-Kottarakkara Diocese
- Madhya Kerala Diocese
- Malabar Diocese
- Tirunelveli Diocese
