= Myladi =

Myladi may refer to:

- Myladi, Kerala, India
- Myladi, Tamil Nadu, India
