= Marthandam CSI Church =

CSI District Church, Marthandam
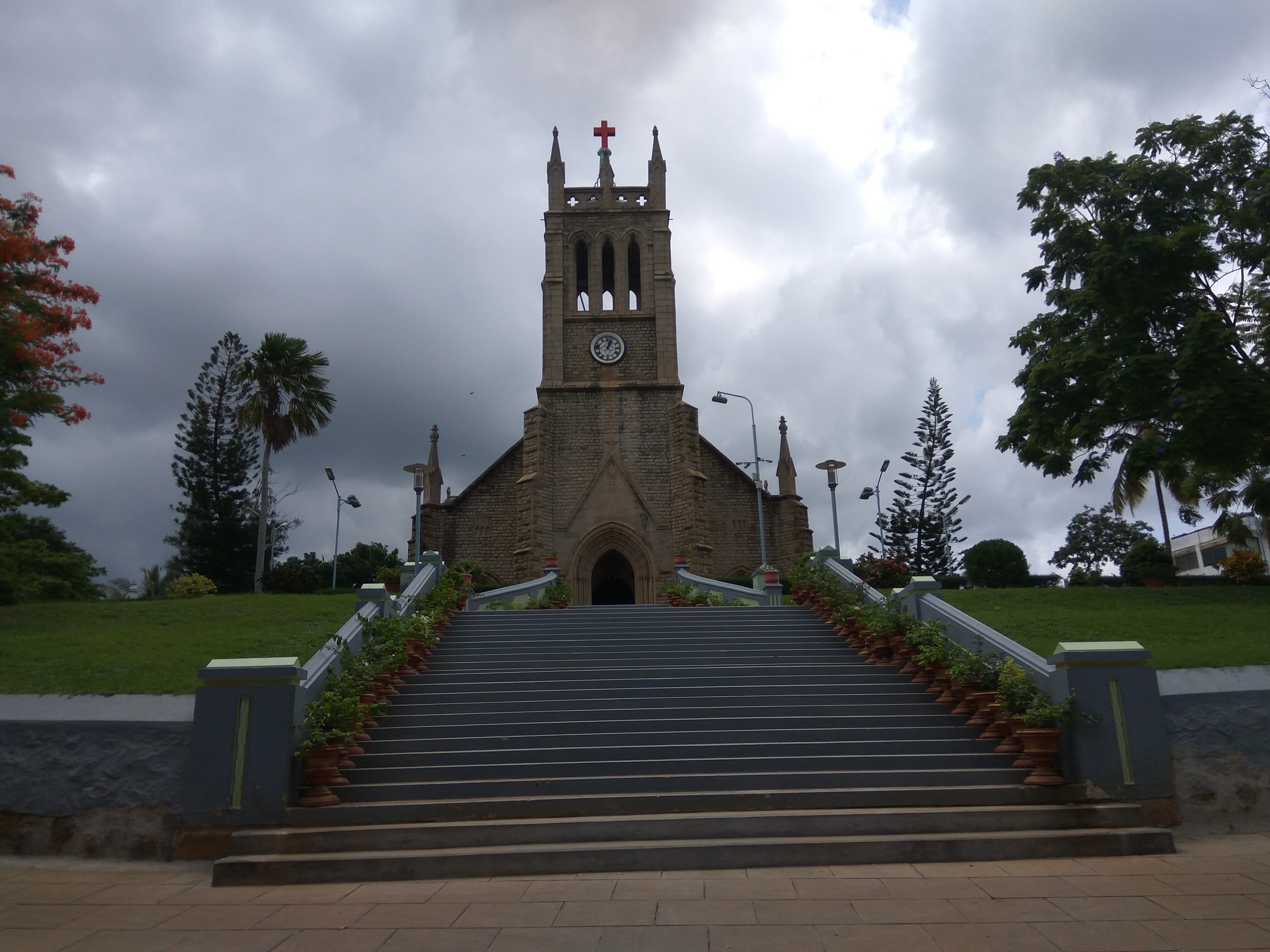
- CSI District Church, Marthandam

- Location within Tamil Nadu
- 8.307168°N 77.223008°E
- Location: Marthandam, Tamil Nadu
- Country: India
- Denomination: Church of South India
- Previous denomination: London Missionary Society
- Website: www.csimtm.org

History
- Status: District Church
- Founded: 26-07-1924
- Founder: Rev. Robert Sinclair

Architecture
- Functional status: Active
- Architect: Rev. Robert Sinclair
- Groundbreaking: 26 July 1924
- Completed: 13 May 1933

Administration
- District: Kanyakumari
- Diocese: Kanyakumari Diocese (former: South Travancore Diocese)

Clergy
- Bishop: Rt. Rev. Dr. S. Christopher Vijayan
- Priest: Rev. Muthusamy christdhas
- Pastor(s): Rev. N. Samuel, Rev. T. Sudheer

Marthandam CSI Church is one of the largest district churches in the Kanyakumari diocese in India. It has the privilege of being the center of various services connected with the Diocese, such as schools, colleges, hospitals, an embroidery industry, a book depot, a press and also a shopping complex.

The church was built by Rev. Robert Sinclair. Sinclair was born in Scotland and came to India after his ordination as a minister on 3 August 1910.He was Sent to India as a Christian Missionary by The London Missionary Society(L.M.S.) . He succeeded Rev. H.I Hacker in 1919, and came to Marthandam in 1920. Rev. Sinclair served from 1919 to 1939.

On 26 July 1924, the foundation stone was laid by Rev. C.G. Marshall. It took ten years to complete the construction work and Rev. Sinclair personally labored with devotion to fulfill his vision. His dream was to make a beautiful place of worship for the emerging congregation in Marthandam. The church was completed and dedicated on 13 May 1933.
