= Rajadurai Foundation =

Indian foundation

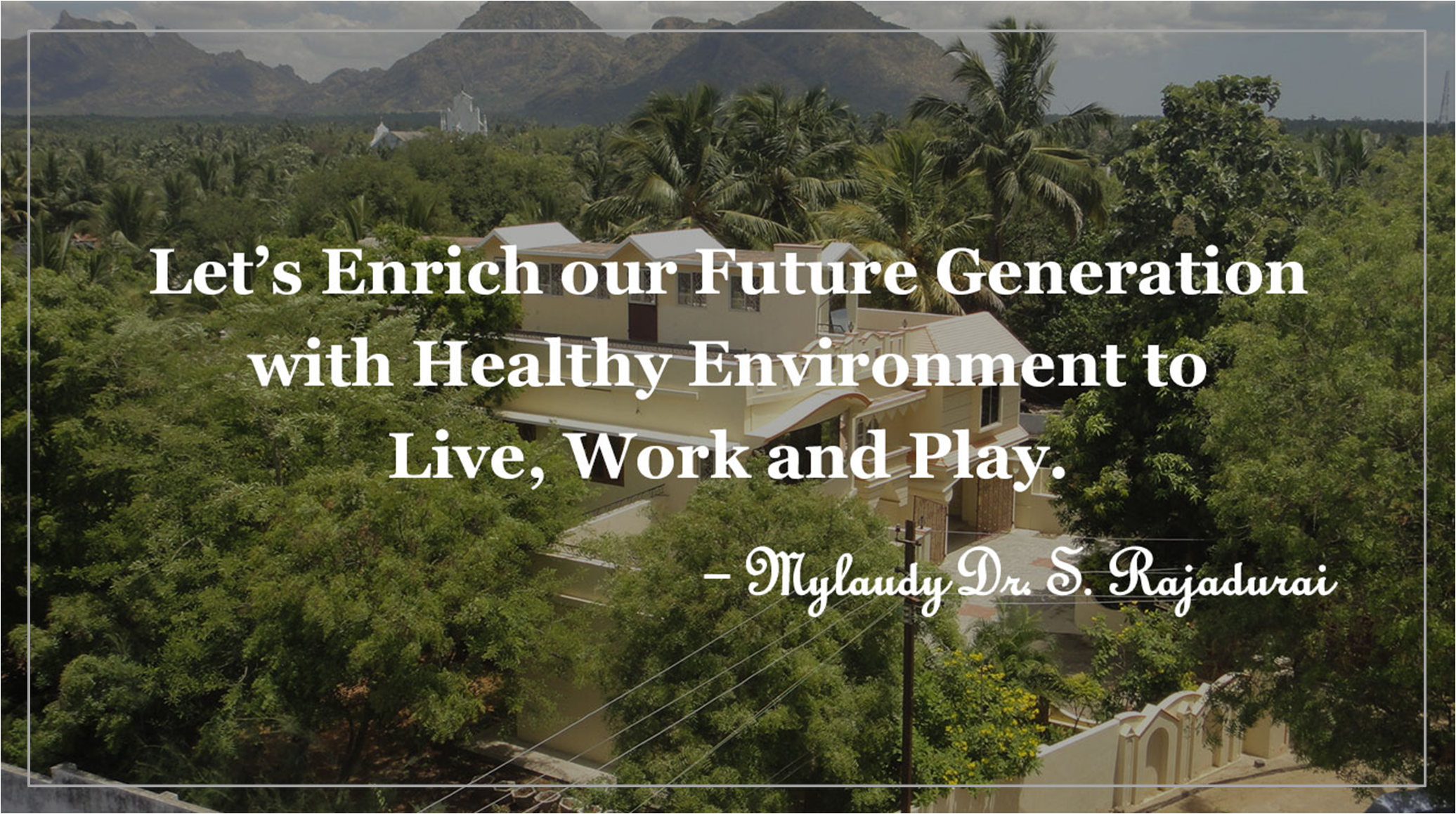
- Founded: 2009
- Founder: Sivanandi Rajadurai
- Purpose: Education Advancement, Environment Protection, Societal Welfare
- Location: Mylaudy, Tamilnadu, India
- Method: Motivation & Mentorship, Scientific Agriculture, Awareness Program
- Key people: Sivanandi Rajadurai, Chairman; Fatima Rajadurai, Director
- Website: www.rajaduraifoundation.com

Rajadurai Foundation was established in 2009 by Sivanandi Rajadurai. It aims to build human potential through advancement of professional aspiration, academic scholarship, environment protection, and societies.

== Activities ==
Rajadurai Foundation conducts mentorship programs by delivering scientific and motivational lectures to students, academicians and educators. It promotes the idea of emission control.

Rajadurai is involved with various Research Institutes to close the gap between Innovative Inventions and Industrialization since 1990. He is a Chairman of Industry Institute Interaction Cell (IIIC) in 2011 and Member of Governing Council since 2012, Annai Vailankanni College of Engineering. Rajadurai Foundation established a merit award in Loyola College for the best student of M.Sc. chemistry in the name of Rev. Fr. Sebastian Kalarickal S.J, to recognize his dedicated services to students from the year 2006. He instituted Gurusmrithi Award in 2006 in Mar Ivanios College to be given to the Best Student of M.Sc. Chemistry every year.

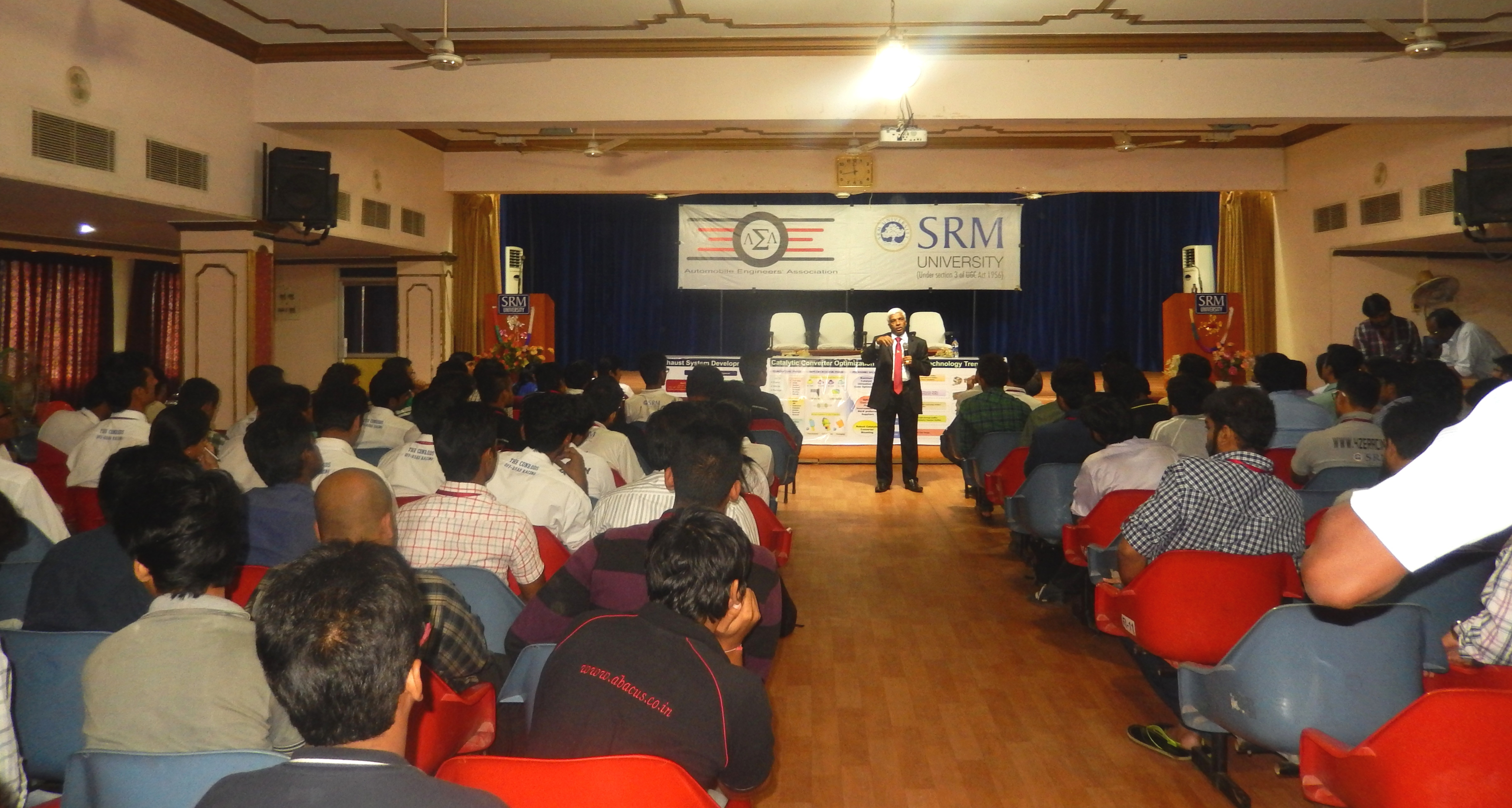
Sivanandi Rajadurai delivering Motivational Lecture to SRM University Students, September 2014

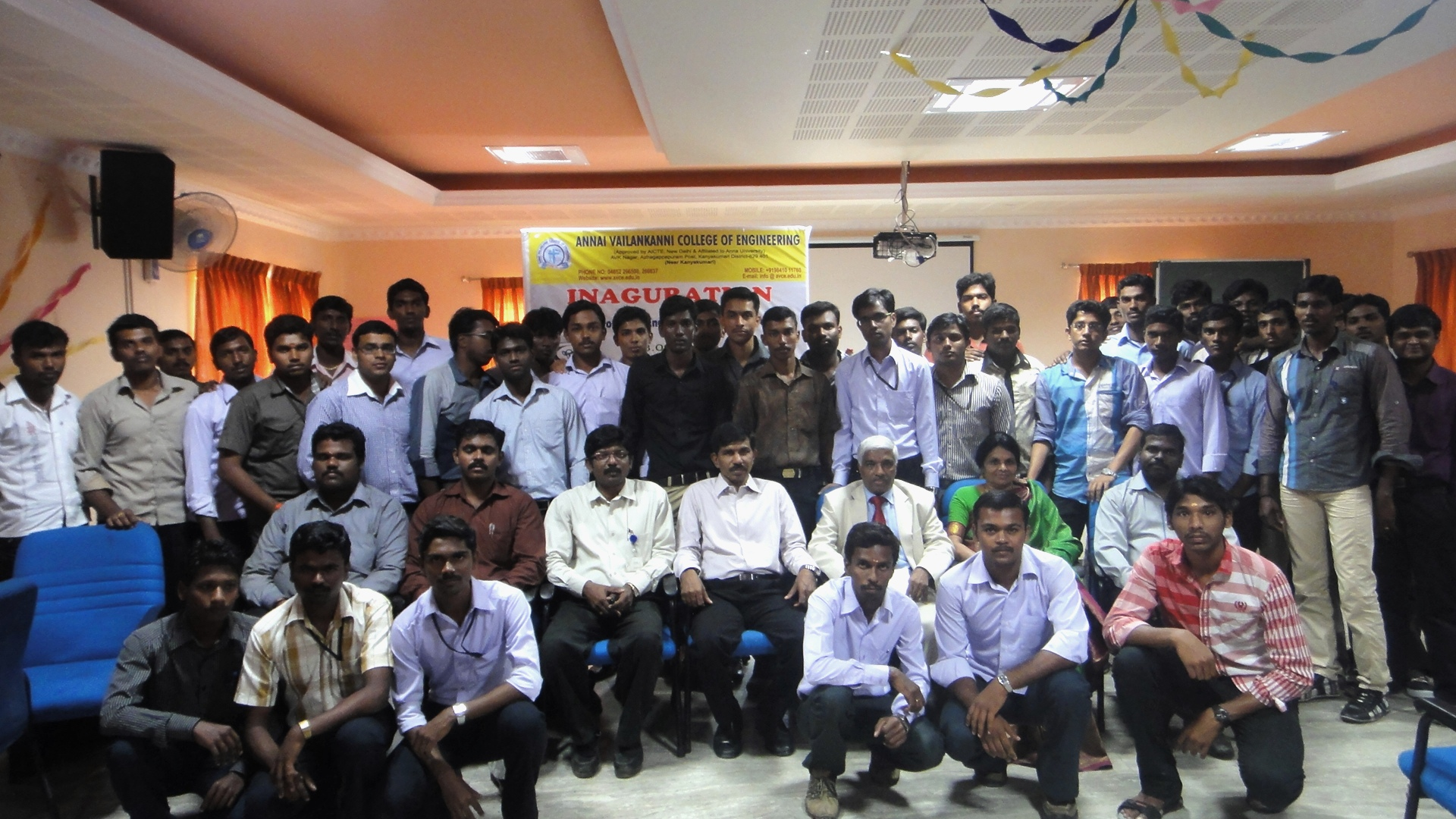
Rajadurai Inaugurated SAE India Collegiate Club at Annai Vailankanni College of Engineering, 2012

Rajadurai Foundation provides awareness education programs in order to develop clean and green environment and to achieve carbon neutral earth. He Initiated and inaugurated Green Technology Centre in James Engineering College to motivate professors and students for a global approach to protect the environment from challenges such as acid rain, global warming, ozone depletion, rainforest deterioration, river contamination, sea level rise, accumulation of hazardous wastes, air pollution and over population, assisted SRM Institute of Science and Technology to develop SAE BAJA Formula Race with CO_{2} reduction, also achieved Near Zero Emission and received National Award.

Rajadurai Foundation supports sports and cultural activities like volleyball, kabaddi, and cricket, through sponsorships.
