= AR Chelliah =

Indian Anglican bishop

Rt. Rev. Dr. Anantha Raj Rayappan Chelliah
- former Bishop of CSI Kanyakumari Diocese
- Church: Christian
- Diocese: CSI Kanyakumari Diocese
- See: Church of South India
- In office: 2019– 2025
- Successor: Rt. Rev. G. Devakadasham
- Previous post: District Chairman

Orders
- Ordination: 1994
- Consecration: 7 July 2019 by Rt. Rev. Thomas K. Oommen & Rt. Rev. Dr. Vadapalli Prasada Rao

Personal details
- Born: July 7, 1958 (age 68) Pulluvilai, Kanyakumari

Anantha Raj Rayappan Chelliah is an Indian religious leader: since 2019 he was a former Bishop of Kanyakumari Diocese.

Chelliah was born on the 7 July 1958. He was educated at Madurai Kamaraj University. Chelliah was ordained in 1994. He served at Neyyoor, and Nagercoil. He was consecrated as bishop of Kanyakumari Diocese at CSI Mylaudy in Kanyakumari District on his 61st birthday.
