= C. Selvamony =

Indian Anglican bishop

C. Selvamony became the second Bishop of Kanyakumari of the Church of South India (CSI) in 1973; and served until 1979.

Selvamony established the Diocesan Plan in 1974. He was a Visiting Lecturer at Mansfield College in Birmingham, England. During his Episcopate 30 new churches were erected. There is now a retreat centre named after him.
