= M. I. Kesari =

Bishop of Church of South India

M.I. Kesari became the fourth Bishop of Kanyakumari of the Church of South India (CSI) in 1997 and served until 2001.

He died at CSI Karakonam Hospital on 10 August 2023 at the age of 87
