= Abbs Valley =

Abbs Valley may refer to several communities in the United States:

- Abbs Valley, Virginia
- Abbs Valley, West Virginia
