= Mathicode =

- Village Panchayat
- Location in Tamil Nadu, India Mathicode (India)
- Coordinates: 8°13′29″N 77°15′49″E
- Country: India
- State: Tamil Nadu
- District: Kanniyakumari

Population (2001)
  - Total: 6,243

Languages
  - Official: Tamil
- Time zone: UTC+5:30 (IST)
- Postal code: 629403

Mathicode is a village and gram panchayat located in Killiyur Circle in Kanyakumari district of Tamil Nadu, India. This panchayat falls under Killiyoor Assembly constituency and Kanniyakumari Lok Sabha constituency. This panchayat has a total of 7 panchayat constituencies. 7 Panchayat Council members are elected from these. According to the 2011 India census, the total population is 6243. Among them 3176 females and 3067 males.

== Small towns ==
Villages in this panchayat include:

- West Mathuravila
- Ambalakottai
- Mathicode
- Mathiravilai
- Muvarpuram
- Mulamuttuvilakam
- Vadakankarai
- Velliyavilai
- Mathikodu AD Colony
