= Acta Biochimica et Biophysica Sinica =

- Discipline: Biochemistry, biophysics
- Language: English
- Edited by: Boliang Li

Publication details
- Former name: Shengwu Huaxue Yu Shengwu Wuli Xuebao
- History: 1958–present
- Publisher: Oxford Journals (China)
- Frequency: Monthly
- Impact factor: 2.224 (2017)

Standard abbreviations
- ISO 4: Acta Biochim. Biophys. Sin.
- NLM: Acta Biochim Biophys Sin (Shanghai)

Indexing
- CODEN: ABBSC2
- ISSN: 1672-9145 (print); 1745-7270 (web)
- LCCN: 2004243168
- OCLC no.: 58876308

Links
- Journal homepage

Shengwu Huaxue Yu Shengwu Wuli Xuebao
- Discipline: Biochemistry, Biophysics
- Language: Chinese

Publication details
- History: August 1961 – December 2003
- Publisher: Shanghai Kexue Jishu Chubanshe (People's Republic of China)
- Frequency: Monthly (2003)

Indexing
- CODEN: SHWPAU
- ISSN: 0582-9879
- OCLC no.: 613327495

Links
- Library of Congress catalog record

Acta Biochimica et Biophysica Sinica (ABBS) is a peer-reviewed scientific journal which publishes original research articles, short communications, and reviews in the fields of biochemistry and biophysics. Established in 1958, the journal is sponsored by the Institute of Biochemistry and Cell Biology, an institute of the Chinese Academy of Sciences, and is published monthly by Oxford Journals and was published by Blackwell Publishing prior to January 2009.

== Abstracting and indexing ==
This journal is indexed in the following databases:

- Science Citation Index Expanded
- Zoological Record
- BIOSIS Previews
- Chemical Abstracts Service – CASSI
- Index medicus
- MEDLINE
- PubMed

== Former title ==
Acta Biochimica et Biophysica Sinica was a Chinese-language journal entitled "Shengwu Huaxue Yu Shengwu Wuli Xuebao" (see box below), which began publishing sometime in 1958 or 1959, or August 1961, until December 2003 (depending on the source). Tables of contents were in English. Summaries (abstracts) were in English and Russian, and text of articles in Chinese. Later issues were promulgated in the Chinese and English languages. The translated title was "Journal of Biochemistry and Biophysics".

The frequency was quarterly from 1959 to 1963, bimonthly from 1964 to 2002, and finally, monthly by 2003. Publication was suspended from 1966 to 1975. It was indexed in Chemical Abstracts Service. It may have published 35 volumes in total, over the years. In 2004 the journal switched to a full English-language journal under its current title.
