= Abbs Valley, West Virginia =

Unincorporated community in West Virginia, United States

Abbs Valley
- Former community
- Location within the state of West Virginia Abbs Valley (the United States)
- Coordinates: 37°18′13.42″N 81°18′10.36″W
- Country: United States
- State: West Virginia
- County: Mercer
- Elevation: 2,297 ft (700 m)
- Time zone: UTC-5 (Eastern (EST))
  - Summer (DST): UTC-4 (EDT)
- GNIS feature ID: 1678349

Abbs Valley was an unincorporated community in Mercer County, West Virginia. The community was located along the Bluestone River and the Pocahontas District line of the Norfolk Southern Railway. The Abbs Valley post office was also known by the names of Abbyvalley and Sammy.
