= Curusadi St. Antony's Church =

Church near Nagercoil, India

St. Antony's Church, Kurusady
- St. Antony's Church, Kurusady
- 8.1570°N 77.4110°E
- Address: Kurusady, Nagercoil, Kanyakumari district, Tamil Nadu
- Country: India
- Denomination: Catholic Church

Kurusady St. Antony's Church, which is believed to be 400 years old, is near Nagercoil on the southern tip of India. It was said that a Hindu Nadar found a stone with a cross embossed on it. He had dreams and received orders from a form of light to build a church. Worship began in a humble manner and the place came to be called Curusadi ("Curusu" is the Tamil word for cross). Later on, after 21 years of construction, a new church came into being in 1911.
