= I.R.H. Gnanadason =

Indian Anglican bishop

Isaac Richard Harrison Gnanadason was inaugural (1st) Bishop of Kanyakumari; and the 5th Moderator of the Church of South India.

== Notes ==
Religious titles
Preceded by Pereji Solomon	Moderator, Church of South India Synod; 1972	Succeeded by Ananda Rao Samuel
