= G. Christhudhas =

Indian Anglican bishop

G. Christhudhas became the third Bishop of Kanyakumari of the Church of South India (CSI) in 1980; and served until 1997.
