= St. Mary's Basilica, Mulagumoodu =

St. Mary's Basilica
- Basilica of Our Lady of Nativity
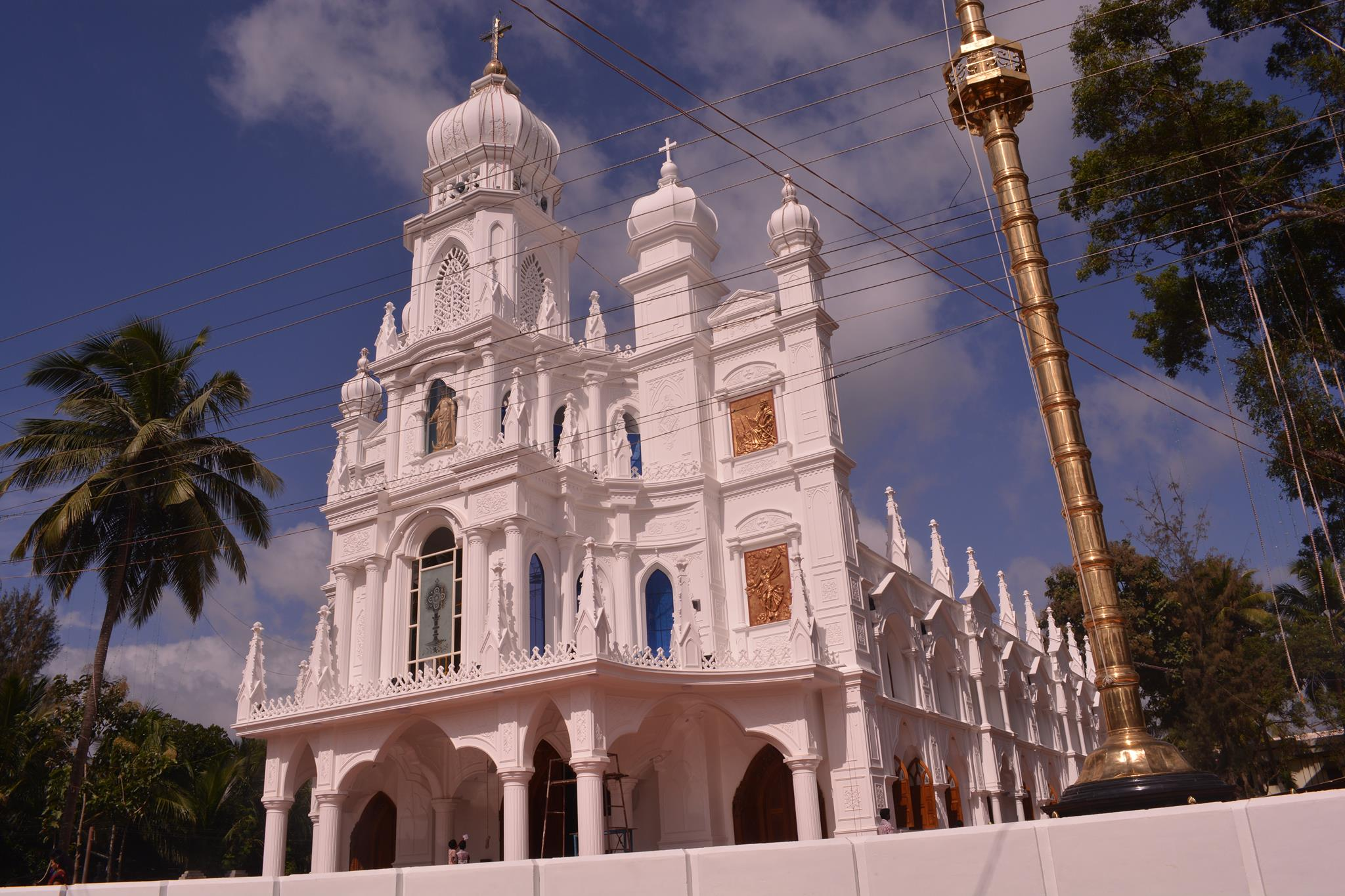

- Location within India Location within Tamil Nadu
- 8.2634811°N 77.2861904°E
- Location: Mulagumudu, Tamil Nadu
- Country: India
- Denomination: Catholic
- Website: stmaryschurchmmu.org

History
- Status: Basilica

Architecture
- Functional status: Active

Administration
- Diocese: Kuzhithurai

St. Mary's Basilica is a church dedicated to Our Lady of the Nativity in Mulagumoodu, Tamil Nadu, India. It is the seventh basilica in the state of Tamil Nadu and the first in Kanyakumari district. The celebrations from 6 to 15 September every year are very popular. The church has a bell from France and a 300-year-old statue of Mary from Belgium.

== History ==
There are records of a church and Catholic community existing in Mulagumoodu in 1847. In the year 1862, a priest, Fr. Victor bought 40 acres (16 ha) of land for the Mulagumoodu parish and started development activities in the area. He built churches, schools, orphanages for boys and girls. The church celebrated its 150th jubilee in 2014. The Vatican intimated the raising of the church to the status of a minor basilica on 7 June 2020. The formal elevation ceremony which was to be held on 20 April 2021 was postponed due to restrictions related to the second wave of the COVID-19 pandemic in India. The ceremony was finally held on 6 September 2021 with the participation of several prelates. The parish is associated with the life of Devasahayam Pillai, who was a native of the region.
