= ABB (disambiguation) =

ABB is a Swedish-Swiss high-tech engineering multinational corporation.

ABB or Abb may also refer to:

== Businesses and organizations ==
- ABB, a Swedish-Swiss engineering corporation
- ABB Grain, an Australian agribusiness
- Azərbaycan Beynaxalq Bankı, the International Bank of Azerbaijan
- African Blood Brotherhood, a former radical black liberation group in the US
- Alex Boncayao Brigade, a Filipino communist death squad
- Aussie Broadband

== People with the surname ==
- Gustav Abb (1886–1945), German librarian

== Transport infrastructure ==
- RAF Abingdon (former IATA code "ABB")
- Akron and Barberton Belt Railroad (reporting mark ABB)
- Asaba International Airport in Delta State, Nigeria (IATA airport code ABB)

== Other uses ==
- The Allman Brothers Band, an American rock band
- Bankon language, a Bantu language of Cameroon (ISO 639-3 code "abb")
- αΒΒ, a deterministic global optimization algorithm
- Æbbe of Coldingham, an English saint known as Abb
- Archives of Biochemistry and Biophysics, a peer-reviewed scientific periodical
- Activity Based Budgeting
- ABB (banana), a clade of banana
