= Desikar =

Tamil community in Tamil Nadu

Desikar is a Tamil-speaking community from the Indian states of Tamil Nadu and Kerala.
