= John Abbs =

English missionary to India (1810–1888)

Rev. John Abbs (1810–1888) was an English missionary sent out to Southern India by the London Missionary Society. He spent 22 years in Travancore, a period rarely exceeded by European missionaries in India at that time. He was the husband of Louisa Sewell Abbs and the author of Twenty-Two Years' Missionary Experience in Travancore. Christianity remains strong in the area where he worked.

== Background ==
Abbs was born in Norwich on 20 December 1810; his father Zachariah Abbs was a boot and shoemaker born in 1775 in Sustead, Norfolk, and his mother, Mary Holl, was born in 1776 in Norwich. His father belonged to the congregation of St Michael's, Coslany, in Norwich and appears as a witness to various wills and testaments in his lifetime.

== Missionary work ==
From 1834 to 1837, Abbs studied at the nonconformist theological college of Cheshunt. He was ordained at the conclusion of the Norfolk Auxiliary Meeting on 23 August 1837, and on the same day appointed to Neyyoor, South Travancore. He married Louisa Sewell Skipper on 15 September 1837 at Princes Street Chapel, Norwich. They departed from England in October 1837 and arrived in Quilton, South India in March 1838. They reached the mission station in Neyyoor on 20 April 1838.

Abbs worked in Neyyoor under Rev. Charles Mead, the western portion of the district being put under his charge. His wife and Mrs Mault, also the wife of a missionary, began to teach lace-making and embroidery to local girls. While in Neyyoor, the Abbs's had three children: John Henry (born 1838), Amelia (born 1841) and Louisa (born 1842).

In 1845 Abbs was transferred to Pareychaley, South Travancore, where a bungalow had been erected for Abbs to found his own mission. Here he continued to educate local inhabitants in subjects that included literacy, health and religion. His mission became the headquarters for the mission district. As the village and district prospered, the mission became one of the largest in the world, with over 10,000 native Christians under the charge of one European missionary.

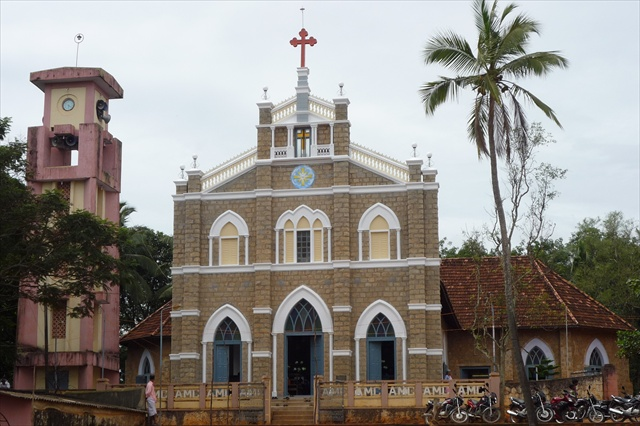
Abbs Memorial Church

His wife taught local girls at the boarding school subjects that included religion, history, geography and some elements of natural philosophy. She continued the work she had done in Neyyoor and began an embroidery industry in the district. The workers were paid a reasonable wage and the surplus was used mostly for building up institutions intended for women.

While in Pareychaley, the Abbses had two more children: Selina, born in 1847, and Charles, born in 1849. In 1850 Louisa briefly went to England with her children, leaving them there at missionary schools and with family members. She then returned to her husband in Travancore and remained until 1859, when they returned to Norwich.

The success of Abbs's mission can be seen today: the district contains some 100 congregations and an Abbs Memorial Church in Parassala built in his honour.

== Return to England ==
Abbs's correspondence during his time in Southern India is preserved at the University of London in the library archives of the School of Oriental and African Studies, along with a history of Travancore he wrote in 1861, which remained in manuscript.

After returning to England in 1861, Abbs was appointed Minister of the Bethel Chapel in Kirkbymoorside, Yorkshire, where he moved with his wife and three daughters, all by then governesses. In 1870 he produced his book Twenty-Two Years' Missionary Experience in Travancore, which was published by his son C. J. Abbs in Dewsbury and by John Snow & Co. in London. His wife died in 1872. He retired as minister in 1877 but remained in Kirkbymoorside until his death on 19 March 1888.
