= Richard Knill =

British minister (1787–1857)

Richard Knill (14 April 1787 – 2 January 1857) was an English missionary.

Rev. Richard Knill

== Life ==
He was born at Braunton, Devon, on 14 April 1787, the fourth child of Richard Knill, a carpenter (died 15 December 1826), and Mary Tucker (died 1826). In 1804 he enlisted as a soldier, and was shortly afterwards bought out by his friends. He became a student of the Western Academy at Axminster in 1812, and under the influence of a sermon by Dr. Alexander Waugh, volunteered for missionary work.

He was accepted by the London Missionary Society, and embarked for Madras 20 April 1816, with another missionary, Charles Mead, who was taking up a post as successor to William Tobias Ringeltaube.

Knill preaching in India

There he engaged in English services for the schools, soldiers and residents, while studying the native languages. His health soon failed, and he was sent in September 1818 to Nágarkoil in Travancore; during his short stay, he worked with Mead, and he laid the foundation stone of the Home Church at Nagercoil on New Year's Day 1819. After suffering from the cholera, he returned to England on 30 November 1819. A cold climate was recommended, and he sailed on 18 October 1820 for St. Petersburg, intending to proceed to Siberia as a missionary. On the persuasion of the British and Americans, he agreed to remain there, where his work obtained the support of the emperor and the royal family. He also met various members of the Russian nobility, including several of the Golitsyn family, especially Prince Alexander Nikolaevich Golitsyn who served as President of the Russian Bible Society. He was a friend of John Venning and John Paterson who were missionaries as well as advocates of Russian prison reform.

A Protestant Bible Society was formed for supplying the Bible in their own tongues to Germans, Finns, Poles, Livonians and other persons not belonging to the Greek church. A school was opened for the children of foreigners, and a mission to the sailors at Kronstadt (the harbour used by the navy about ten km from St. Petersburg) was established. He returned to England in August 1833 to obtain funds for erecting a larger church in St. Petersburg. He was so successful in creating funds and friends for the London Missionary Society, that he was requested to remain at home, and for eight years he visited almost every place in the United Kingdom, advocating the claims of the foreign missions.

On 1 January 1842 he settled down as congregational minister at Wotton-under-Edge, Gloucestershire, where he remained until his removal to Chester in 1848. During his last days he preached in the Chester Theatre for twenty Sunday afternoons.

Knill was influential in encouraging Charles Spurgeon to seek salvation and to be a preacher of the gospel. He spent several days with the child Spurgeon at Stambourne Parsonage in 1844, home of Spurgeon's grandfather, praying with him and teaching him. He announced to Charles and his family that the child would one day preach the gospel to great multitudes. Knill was overjoyed to learn of Spurgeon's ministry and wrote to Spurgeon's grandfather in 1855 to express this. Spurgeon later preached for Knill in Chester.

Knill died at 28 Queen Street, Chester, England, on 2 January 1857.

== Personal life ==
On 9 January 1823 he married Sarah, daughter of James and Isabella Notman, a native of St. Petersburg, by whom he had five children.

There is a monument to Richard and Sarah in Cheshire.

== Publications ==
1. The Farmer and his Family, 1814
2. Memoir of the Life and Character of Walter Venning, 1822
3. The Influence of Pious Women in Promoting a Revival of Religion, 1830
4. Some Account of John Knill, 1830
5. The Happy Death-bed, 1833
6. A Traveller arrived at the End of the Journey, 1836
7. A Dialogue between a Romish Priest and R. Knill, Missionary, 1841
8. A Scotchman Abroad, 1841
