= Louisa Sewell Abbs =

English missionary to India (1811–1872)

Louisa Sewell Abbs (née Skipper) (1811–1872) was the wife of English missionary Rev. John Abbs who helped establish the lace and embroidery industry in Travancore, Southern India. She also founded and taught at girls boarding schools during her time in India.

== Background ==
She was born in Norwich 1811. Her father was Samuel Skipper b. 1781 in Sinfield, Norfolk and her mother was Amelia Powell b. 1782 in Beccles, Suffolk. Although born in Norwich, her earlier life was spent in the rural village of Forncett. She attended a school run by a Unitarian minister, whose family loaned her many books. She attended the Parish Church in the morning and the Unitarian chapel in the afternoon. She became involved with the Church Missionary Auxiliary in Norwich, She assisted in organising prayer meetings, collecting for the church and the Jewish community, visiting the poor and afflicted. She became a member of the tabernacle and a Sabbath school teacher, although she maintained her relationships with her Christian fellowship.

When she was 18 she offered her services as a teacher in the West Indies in one of the Church Mission Schools, The committee highly approved of her zeal and piety although they thought of her too young for such an important undertaking.

Louisa married Rev. John Abbs 15 Sep 1837 at the Princes Street Chapel, Norwich, Norfolk.

== Travancore, India ==
In October 1837 her husband was appointed by the London Missionary Society to Neyoor, Travancore, India. They departed England the same month; they arrived in Quilton, South India March 1838 and finally arrived at the mission in Neyoor 20 April 1838.

In Neyoor while her husband worked alongside Rev. Charles Mead, She educated local girls and cared for the sick and afflicted. She along with Mrs Mault, the wife of another missionary began to teach lace making and embroidery to the local girls. While in Neyoor she gave birth to 3 children, John Henry b. 1838, Amelia b.1841 and Louisa b.1842.

In 1845 Rev. John Abbs was transferred to Pareychaley, South Travancore where a bungalow had been erected for Rev. Abbs to found his own mission. Louisa followed her husband she established girls boarding and orphan schools and taught the native girls subjects including religious education, history, geography and elements of natural philosophy. She continued her work from Neyoor and began the Embroidery Industry in the Pareychaley. The workers were paid a reasonable salary and the surplus was used mostly in building up institutions intended for women.

While in Pareychaley she gave birth to two more children, Selina b.1847 and Charles b.1849.

In 1850 Louisa briefly returned to England with her children for their education. She spent two years at home, although her stay in England was short, there was noted increased interest in the Christian Churches of Norwich, Ladies sewing meetings were established and her presence was desired for the purpose of communicating missionary information. While back home she raised monies for her husband’s mission. Dr. Tidman, the foreign secretary stated at a public meeting in Norwich that he considered her as far as his personal knowledge went, one of the best missionary wives in their service.

She returned to Travancore leaving her children at missionary schools and with family. She continued her work with John until 1859 when they returned to Norwich, England. Mrs Abbs’ work is still present today with the lace and embroidery industry still present in the district.

The Abbs Memorial Church in Parassala was built in honour of her husband Rev. John Abbs. http://upload.wikimedia.org/wikipedia/commons/c/c4/Abbs_Memorial_Church.jpg

== Return to England ==
In 1859 Louisa returned to her home town of Norwich. In 1861 she moved with her family to Kirkbymoorside, Yorkshire as her husband had been appointed the minister of The Bethel Chapel. In 1872 Louisa died at her home surrounded by her family. On her memorial card the words “She hath done what she could” are engraved. Louisa’s last words are noted after her youngest son asked whether she had anything to say to her family, she replied “Meet me in heaven” as stated in “Brief Memorial of Louisa Sewell Abbs” which was published by her youngest son C.J. Abbs of Dewsbury in 1872 .
