= Myladi, Kerala =

Myladi
- village
- Location in Kerala, India Myladi (India)
- Coordinates: 11°6′0″N 76°2′50″E
- Country: India
- State: Kerala
- District: Malappuram
- Time zone: UTC+5:30 (IST)
- Vehicle registration: KL-

Myladi is a village in Kerala, India.
