= South Thamaraikulam =

South Thamaraikulam Thenthamaraikulam
- panchayat town
- Location in Tamil Nadu, India South Thamaraikulam (India)
- Coordinates: 8.17°N 77.43°E
- Country: India
- State: Tamil Nadu
- District: Kanyakumari

Languages
  - Official: Tamil
- Time zone: UTC+5:30 (IST)

South Thamaraikulam (also known as Thenthamaraikulam) is a panchayat town in Kanyakumari district, Tamil Nadu, near Nagercoil. It is the site of Thamaraikulam Pathi, one of the five holy places of Ayyavazhi.

== Demographics ==
As of 2001 India census, Thenthamaraikulam had a population of 11,068. Males constitute 49% of the population and females 51%. Thenthamaraikulam has an average literacy rate of 82%, higher than the national average of 59.5%: male literacy is 84%, and female literacy is 81%. In Thenthamaraikulam, 10% of the population is under 6 years of age.
