= S. Christopher Vijayan =

Church of South India bishop (born 1968)

The Right Reverend S. Christopher Vijayan
- Bishop of Kanyakumari
- Church: Church of South India
- Diocese: Kanyakumari
- In office: 2025–present
- Predecessor: AR Chelliah
- Previous posts: District Minister, CSI Church, Neyyoor

Orders
- Ordination: 29 August 1999
- Consecration: 7 December 2025 by K. Reuben Mark

Personal details
- Born: July 25, 1968 (age 57) Maruthancode, Kanyakumari district

Selvamony Christopher Vijayan (born 25 July 1968) is an Indian Protestant bishop. He has served as the seventh Bishop of Kanyakumari in the Church of South India since 7 December 2025.

== Early life and education ==
Vijayan was born on 25 July 1968 to G. Selvamony and V. Esther in Maruthancode, Kanyakumari district, Tamil Nadu. He was raised in the Christian faith.

He completed a Bachelor of Arts at Madurai Kamaraj University, a Bachelor of Theology (B.Th) at Gurukul Lutheran Theological College, Chennai, and a Bachelor of Divinity (B.D.) and Master of Theology (M.Th) at Tamil Nadu Theological Seminary, Madurai. He subsequently completed a Doctor of Ministry (D.Min) at Serampore University, with a thesis on revamping the health and educational activities of the Christu Kula Ashram, Thirupatur, under the supervision of M. Peter Singh of Tamil Nadu Theological Seminary.

He is married to Seline Netto.

== Career ==
Vijayan was ordained as a presbyter on 29 August 1999. He served at St. Peter's Church before completing a training and exposure programme organised by USPG, London. He was subsequently placed as presbyter at Liberty CSI Church, Kadamalaikuntu.

During his early ministry he published a short biography of Bishop V. S. Azariah in Tamil. In 2003, he pursued an M.Th in the History of Christianity at Tamil Nadu Theological Seminary, Madurai. Following this, he was appointed Director of Communications in the Kanyakumari Diocese, contributing to diocesan publications.

He later served as presbyter at the CSI Church in Muhilankuzhi and as Correspondent of the CSI VV Teacher Training Institute. He was then appointed Director of Mission and Evangelism at the CSI Synod.

He subsequently served as General Secretary of the National Missionary Society of India (NMSI), providing leadership in national-level mission programmes. He later served as District Minister at CSI Church, Neyyoor.

He was consecrated as Bishop of Kanyakumari on 7 December 2025 by the Most Reverend K. Reuben Mark, Moderator of the Church of South India, succeeding AR Chelliah, whose term ended on 7 July 2025.
