= William Tobias Ringeltaube =

British missionary (1770–1816)

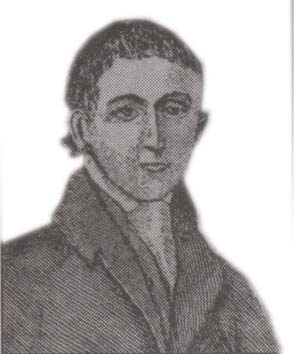
- Born: 8 August 1770; Brzeg, Silesia, Kingdom of Prussia (now Poland)
- Died: After 27 September 1816 (aged 46 or older); Java Sea
- Education: Halle University
- Occupations: Pastor; missionary

William Tobias Ringeltaube, or Wilhelm Tobias Ringeltaube (8 August 1770 – after 27 September 1816) was the first Protestant missionary in the far south of India. He spent much of his time in Travancore.

== Early life ==
William Tobias Ringeltaube, born in August 1770, was the first child of Gottlieb Ringeltaube, Vicar of Scheidelwitz (today Szydlowice), near Brzeg, in Silesia, Prussia. Aged seven, his family went to Warsaw, Poland, for nine years. He was educated by his father before attending the University of Halle.

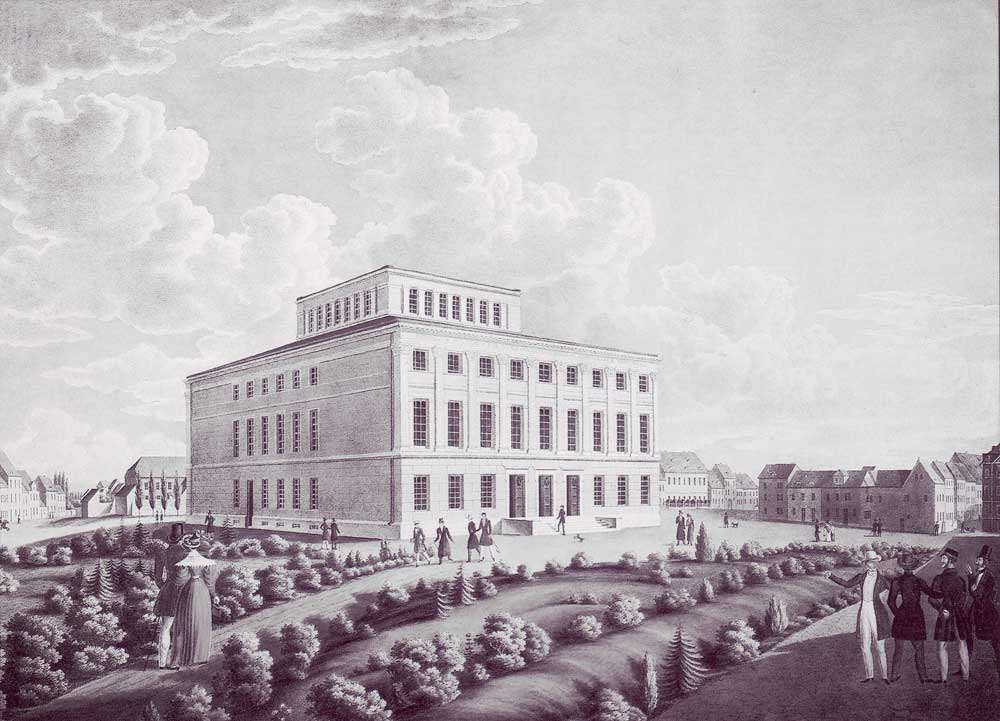
The University of Halle in 1836

At 16, his father took on the role of court preacher and general superintendent in Oels, Silesia. Aged 18, William went on a walking tour and made the decision to become a Christian missionary.

He was ordained in Wernigerode in 1796, and spent time in Calcutta and England before he was invited by the London Missionary Society (L.M.S) in 1803 to join its mission to India. He sailed for Tranquebar on April 20, 1804, with several other missionaries and stayed a year to learn the Tamil language.

== Career ==
Ringeltaube was the first Protestant missionary to South Travancore. He arrived at the Aralvaimozhi (Kanyakumari district) on 25 April 1806. He received an invitation from the first Protestant Christian from Mylaudy, Maharasan Vedamanickam Vethamonickam Desikar, who had been converted to Christianity in Tanjore by Rev. Kohlhoff, an SPCK missionary. Vedamanickam Maharasan Desikar, met Ringeltaube in Thanjavur; the two of them worked together to create a mission in Travancore.

In March 1807, Ringeltaube baptized 40 people in Mylaudy, and he planned to build a church. Diwan Veluthambi objected to Ringeltaube's plan to build a church there. Colonel Colin Macaulay helped him to get permission to buy land in the area; however Ringeltaube had to wait until after Veluthambi’s death to make use of the land.

In May 1809 he laid the foundation for a church in Mylaudy. Within four months the church construction work was completed. In September 1809 Ringeltaube dedicated the first Protestant Church of South Travancore.

There was a well on the south side of the Church and a pond was dug a short distance away from the church to solve the water problem, for the benefit of the people of Mylaudy. Ringeltaube also cleared some fields near the pond. He helped stop many of the taxes imposed on people. He also opened schools in the area and started job schemes so that new converts could earn a wage.

Ringeltaube's ministries included building schools and orphanages, providing job training, and proclaiming the gospel. He opened churches in Kanyakumari district, including in Mylaudy, South Thamaraikulam, Puthalam, Koilvilai (James Town), Zionpuram, Perinbapuram and Ananthanadarkudy. For three years, he struggled to obtain permission to build a church in Mylaudy. From 1806 to 1809 he frequently visited Palayamkottai and set up a base there for a time. There was a famine for several months in 1813. He went to Mylaudy and prayed fervently for rain; the rain arrived soon after.

He left Travancore in 1816.

== Personal life ==
Ringeltaube suffered hardships and from physical abuse. He had frequent illnesses. He lived in a simple house with little access to good food or comfort. He was careless of convention in speech and dress, and walked around with a simple straw hat on his head.

== Final trip ==
On 23 January 1816, Ringeltaube expressed his desire to return to his homeland to his congregation members. He handed over all the responsibility to Vedamonikam, who ran the mission for the next two years. On 5 February 1816, Ringeltaube sailed from Kollam to Chennai. When the ship arrived at Manakudi, he remembered the debt he had written on the wall of his house. He asked the sailor to stop the ship and he travelled to Mylaudy where he destroyed the debt account. Afterwards, he again sailed to Chennai. He then travelled from Chennai to Sri Lanka and then to Malacca and then to Batavia on September 27, 1816.

== Death ==
The exact circumstances of his death are unknown. The most common belief is that he died of liver failure on the voyage to South Africa and was buried at sea. The ship's daily diary recorded that a passenger died. There is also a belief that he arrived safely in Cape Town and spent four years there before dying in 1820.

== Legacy ==
His work was continued by the LMS missionaries Charles Mead and Richard Knill; Mead extended Ringeltaube's educational work and established the LMS Seminary at Nagercoil, as well as the LMS Press. The LMS Press was one of a kind in Travancore, capturing the king's attention who in turn invited missionaries to establish a government press. Charles and Johanna Mead served in Travancore for 56 years, opening churches and schools throughout the area.

Ringeltaube Vethamonikam Memorial Church, Mylaudy and Ringeltaube Memorial Higher Secondary School in Mylaudy are named after him; the CSI Kanyakumari Diocese also holds a Ringeltaube Convention and an annual memorial service on 25 April (Ringeltaube day) at Mylaudy church.
