= Neyyoor =

- Town
- Interactive map of Neyyoor
- Country: India
- State: Tamil Nadu
- District: Kanyakumari

Population
  - Total: 9,479

Languages
  - Official: Tamil
- Time zone: UTC+5:30 (IST)
- PIN: 629802
- Telephone code: 04651
- Vehicle registration: TN 75
- Nearest city: Nagercoil
- Sex ratio: 1010/1000 ♂/♀
- Literacy: 83%
- Lok Sabha constituency: Kanniyakumari
- Vidhan Sabha constituency: Colachal

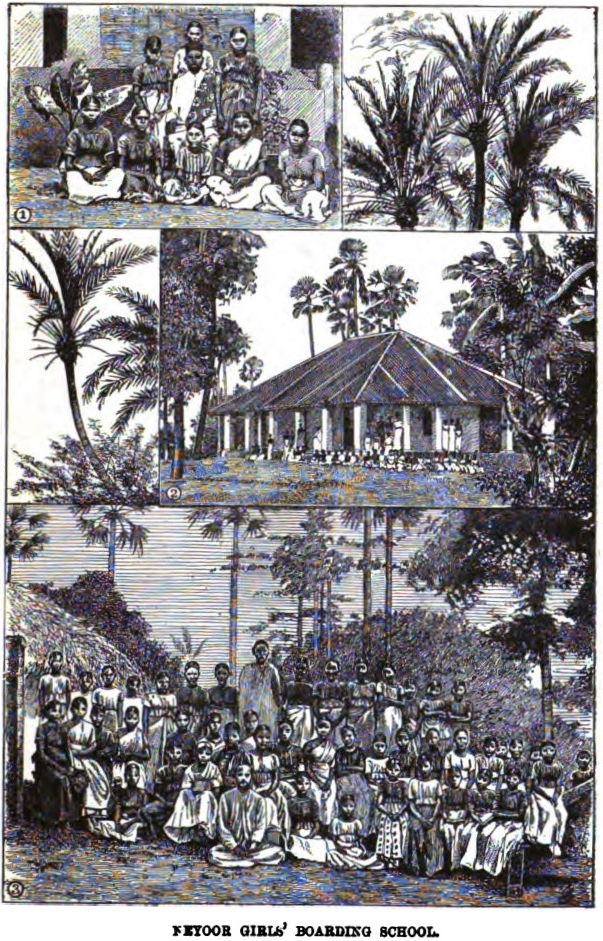
Neyoor Girl's Boarding School (p.19, 1891), London Missionary Society

Neyyoor is a developing village situated in the south of India near Kanyakumari. It is also a town panchayat of Kanyakumari district, Tamil Nadu. The nearest major town is Nagercoil 18 kilometres (11 mi). The nearest railway station is Eraniel Station.The main attraction of this area is the famous Neyoor CSI Hospital, International cancer centre and CSI Church The airports closest to this town are Thiruvananthapuram airport. People here are friendly towards tourists and the whole town-village has a peaceful environment with rarely seen crimes. The place is bordered by Eraniel, Thingal Nagar, the postal code is 629802.

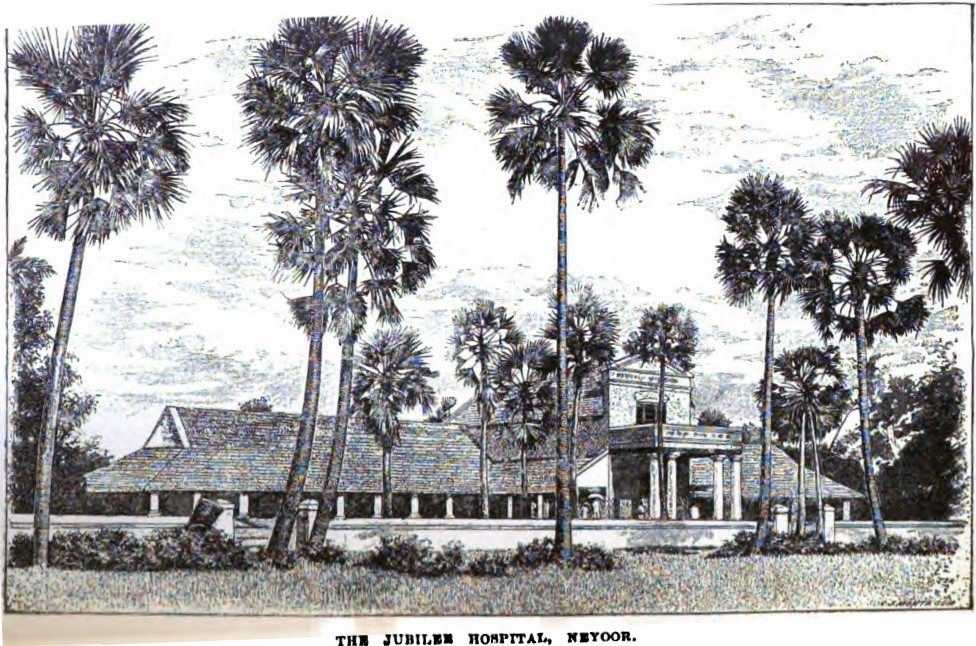
The Jubilee Hospital, Neyoor (p.322, 1891), London Missionary Society

Churches

- CSI Dartmouth Home Church, Neyyoor.
- The Pentecostal Church, Karungal Road, Neyyoor.
- Full Gospel Pentecostal Church, Opp. to Bus Depot, Thingal Nagar, Neyyoor.
- Apostolic Church of God, Zion Street, Neyyoor
- Suvartha House of Worship, West Channel Street, Neyyoor.

Hospitals

- CSI Medical Mission Hospital, Neyyoor
- International Cancer Centre
- Samuel Hospital, Neyyoor

Colleges

- CSI Nursing College, Neyyoor
- CSI Medical College, Neyyoor

== Demographics ==
As of 2001 India census, Neyyoor had a population of 9,479. Males constitute 49% of the population and females 51%. Neyyoor has an average literacy rate of 83%, higher than the national average of 59.5%: male literacy is 83%, and female literacy is 82%. In Neyyoor, 10% of the population is under 6 years of age.
