= Myladi, Tamil Nadu =

Town in Tamil Nadu, India

Myladi
- Town
- Mylaudy
- Kanyakumari, Tamil Nadu Myladi (India)
- Coordinates: 8.155°N 77.505°E
- Country: India
- State: Tamil Nadu
- District: Kanyakumari
- Named for: dancing of peacock, English man calls her wife as my lady

Government
  - Type: Town panchayat
  - Body: Mylaudy Town Panchayat
  - District Collector: Prathap, IAS
  - Police Commissioner: Dr. Stalin, IPS
  - Member of Parliament (MP): Vijay Vasanth
  - Member of Legislative Assembly (MLA): Thalavai Sundaram
  - Panchayath Leader: Vijayalakshmi Babu

Population (2011)
  - Total: 8,961

Languages
  - Official: Tamil, English, Malayalam
- Time zone: UTC+5:30 (IST)
- PIN: 629403
- Telephone code: 91-4652 & +91
- Vehicle registration: TN 74
- Website: www.mylaudytownpanchayat.nic.in

Myladi is one of the town panchayats in Kanniyakumari district in the Indian state of Tamil Nadu. It is a town rich in fields, mountains, rivers and natural resources. Before 1950, Mylaudy was part of South Travancore. Now it is in Kanniyakumari district of Tamil Nadu.

It consist of Post office (Mylaudy Post office-629403), Weekly Vegetables Market (Wednesday & Saturday), Assistant Engineer of PWD office, TNEB Office (Junior Engineer in Tamil nadu Electricity Board Office, Mylaudy), and Mylaudy Village Office among other facilities.

== Transport Facilities ==
- Bus facilities

Government of Tamilnadu is operating buses from Vadaseri, Nagercoil, Aralvaimozhi, Rajavoor, Tiruchendur, Thoothukudi, Uvari, and Kanyakumari (1A, 3, 3A, 3B, 3C, 3E, 3F, 3G, V3, 570, 70C, 30C, 30, 33B, 23....) (Bus stops in mylaudy)

Government of Kerala is operating KSRTC bus between Holy Places Haripad, Thiruvananthapuram, Nagercoil, Suchindram, Mylaudy, Athankarai Pallivasal (Tirunelveli dist).

- Nearest Airport: Trivandrum International & Domestic Airport (TRV), Kerala - Distance is about 74 km
- Nearest Railway Station: Nagercoil Junction railway station - Distance is about 7 km

== Uzhavar Santhai ==
Mylaudy uzhavar santhai

There are only 2 uzhavar santhai in Kanyakumari district, one in Vadaseri, Nagercoil, and another in Mylaudy. Mylaudy Market has 60 shops where farmers can sell their products without paying the entrance fees and shop rent.

Generally, the middlemen and wholesale businessmen purchase the Agricultural products from the farmers at a lower price. They also get the commission from the farmers for the transactions made. In turn, fresh vegetables and fruits purchased at the lower price from the farmers are sold out to retail businessmen at higher price and the retail businessmen sell those Agricultural Products further at higher price to the consumers. As a result, the farmers get only the lower price for their produce whereas the consumers have to pay higher price for the same produce. Hence, the Government of Tamilnadu has introduced an alternate scheme of marketing, which is known as “UZHAVAR SANTHAI” in order to derive more benefits to the farmers as well as consumers.

== Marungoor Soora Samharam and mylaudy Arattu fest ==
The Subramania Swamy Temple, which is situated atop a small hillock is worth a place to visit. This temple area is called as Kumarapuram thoppur, Marungoor. Because of Kumaran's (Subramania swamy) name. Shashti and Surasamharam are the famous festivals at this temple. The famous kandhashashti kavasam festival is very popular over here and celebrated as major festival. after 5 days later Subramania Swamy come to mylaudy by the silver horse car and bath in Mylaudy river and abishekam with 17 products. Every year it was celebrated only in kanyakumari district after 5 days of Surasamharam fest. The people from various place join during the festival. During the festival other religious people also Get together.

== Arattu Arts and Literature Council ==
Every year The members of arts and literature council conducts five days special program between the Deepawali and Arattu festival. They give more important to Tamil literature.

== Demographics ==
As of 2011 India census, Mylaudy had a population of 8961. Males constitute 50% of the population and females 50%. Myladi has an average literacy rate of 72%, higher than the national average of 59.5%: male literacy is 76%, and female literacy is 68%. In Mylaudy, 11% of the population is under 6 years of age. Here religions like Hinduism, Christianity, and Islam are followed.

Literacy rate 72%
Sex	Percent(%)
Male	76%
Female	68%

The Ringeltaube Vethamonikam Memorial Church here, founded by Christian missionary William Tobias Ringeltaube, is one of the largest and oldest churches in India, 1st CSI Church in South Travancore.

== Economy ==
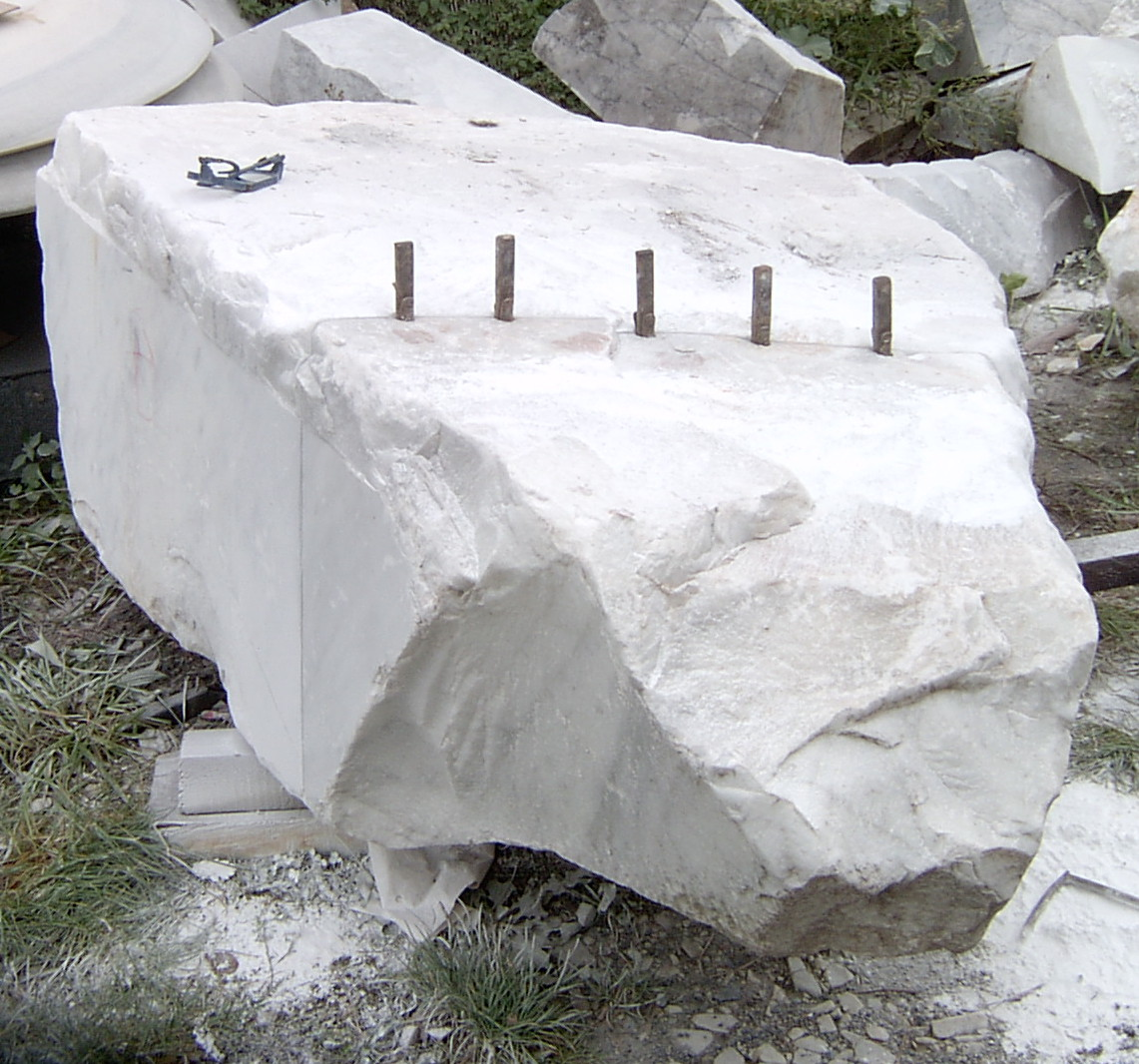
Splitting a block of marble with plug and feathers

Stone sculpture, stone cutting with large machine's, stone temple making is famous in Mylaudy. famous for making many God's statute next to Mahabalipuram. Kattabomman statue in Kayatharu and Thiruvalluvar statue in Chennai were created in Myaudy. Mylaudy sirpi's were skilled in carving idols in one stone. Mylaudy stone sculpture got geographical indications in Tamil Nadu on March 31, 2023. coconut, paddy is a major plantation. Mylaudy is surrounded by two mountains (Western Ghats, Eastern Ghats) and scientists says there is no possibilities of earthquake in Mylaudy followed by Tsunami.

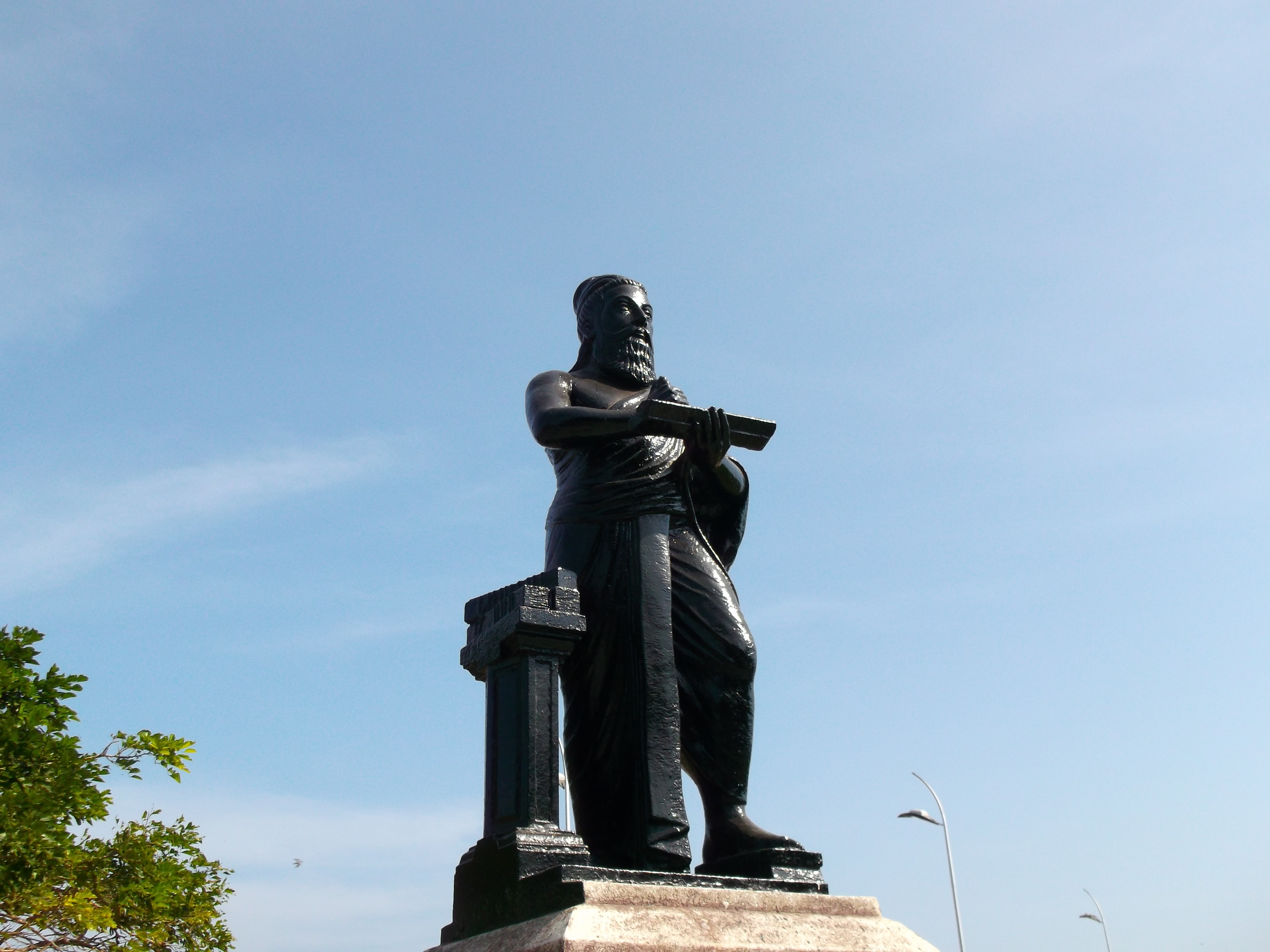
Thiruvalluvar statue in marina beach

== Adjacent communities ==
Nearby towns include marungoor, Suchindram, and azhagappapuram.
