= List of people from Nagercoil =

Town in Tamilnadu, India

The following is a list of prominent people who were born in/lived in or around Nagercoil, or for whom Nagercoil is a significant part of their identity.

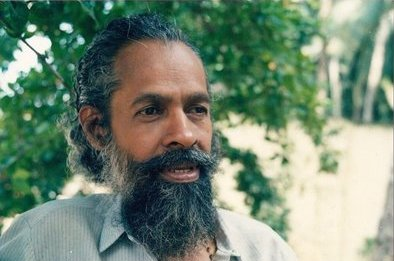
Neela Padmanabhan

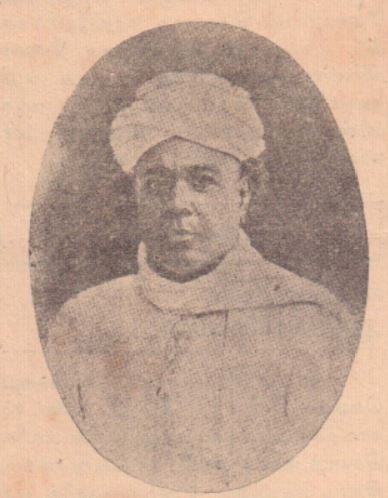
Kavimani Desigavinayagam Pillai

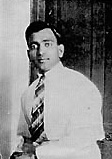
G.D.Boaz

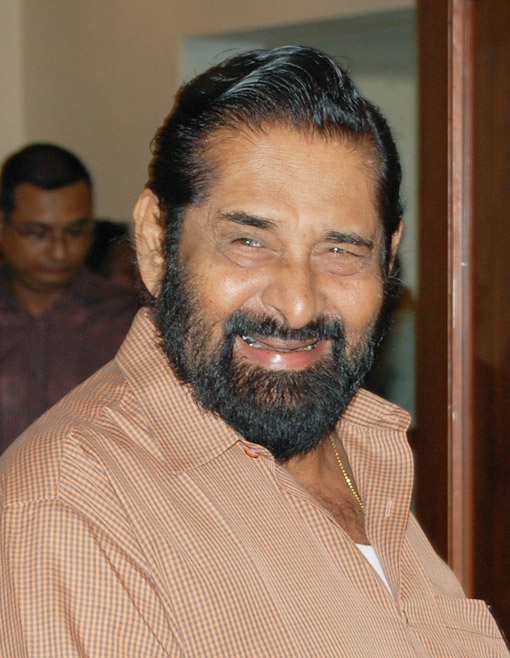
Madhu

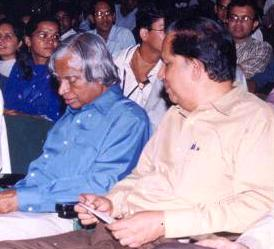
G. Madhavan Nair

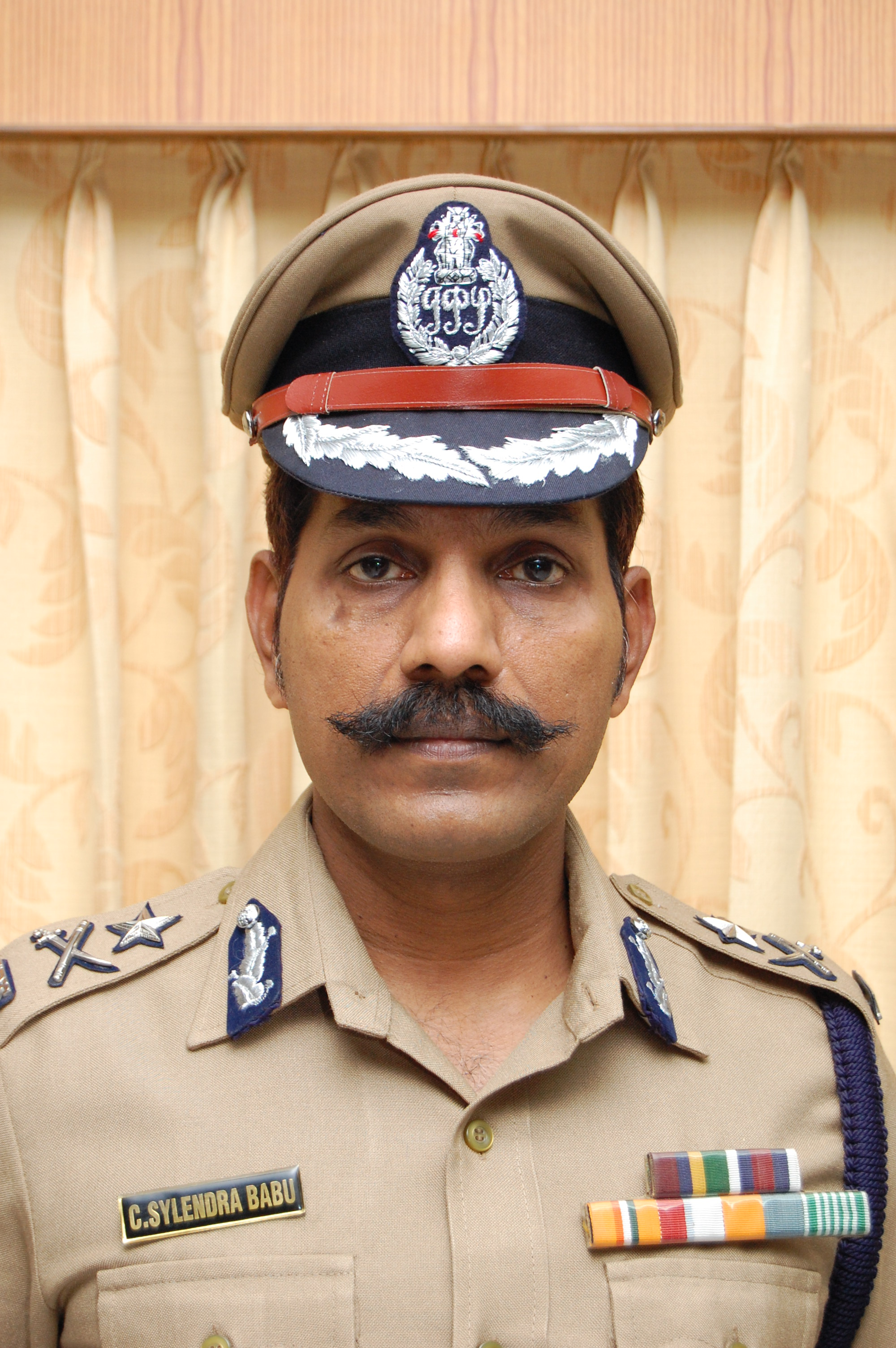
C. Sylendra Babu

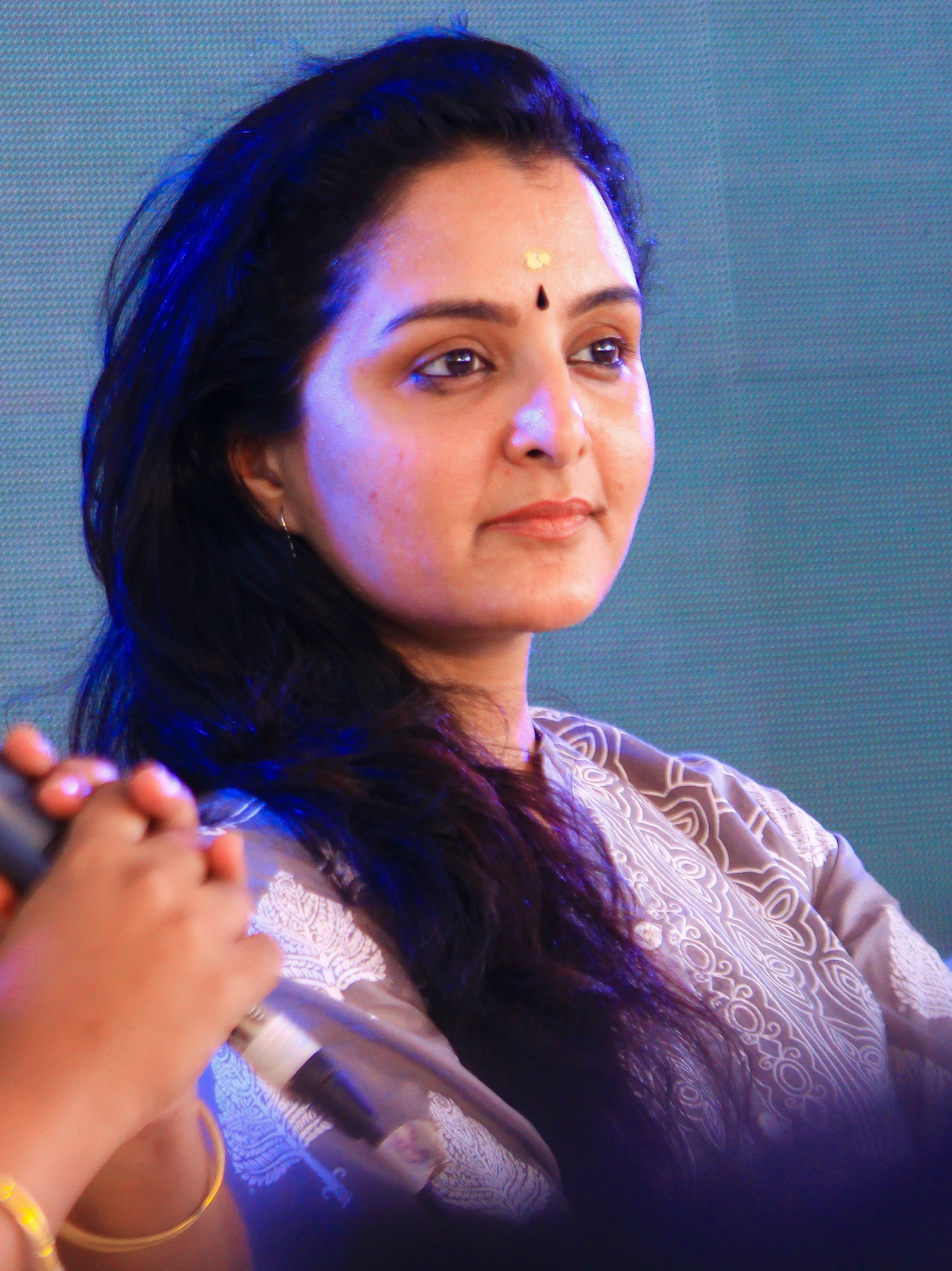
Manju Warrier

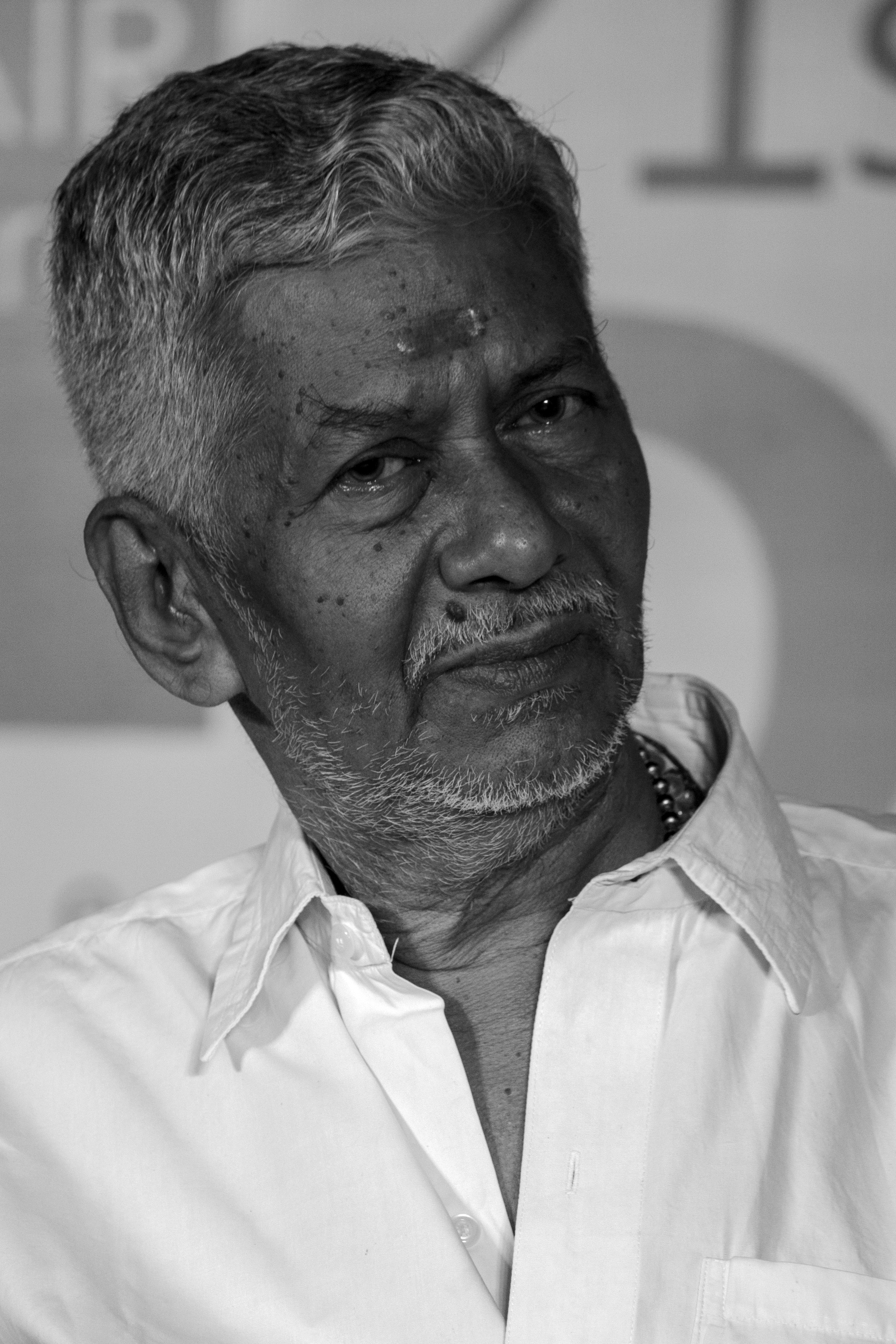
S. Ramesan Nair

H. S. S. Lawrence

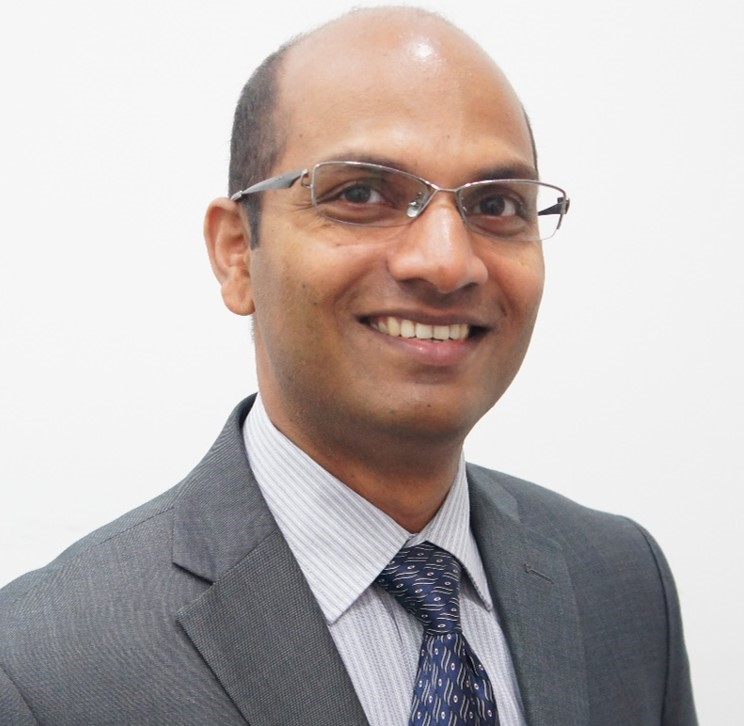
Ajayan Vinu

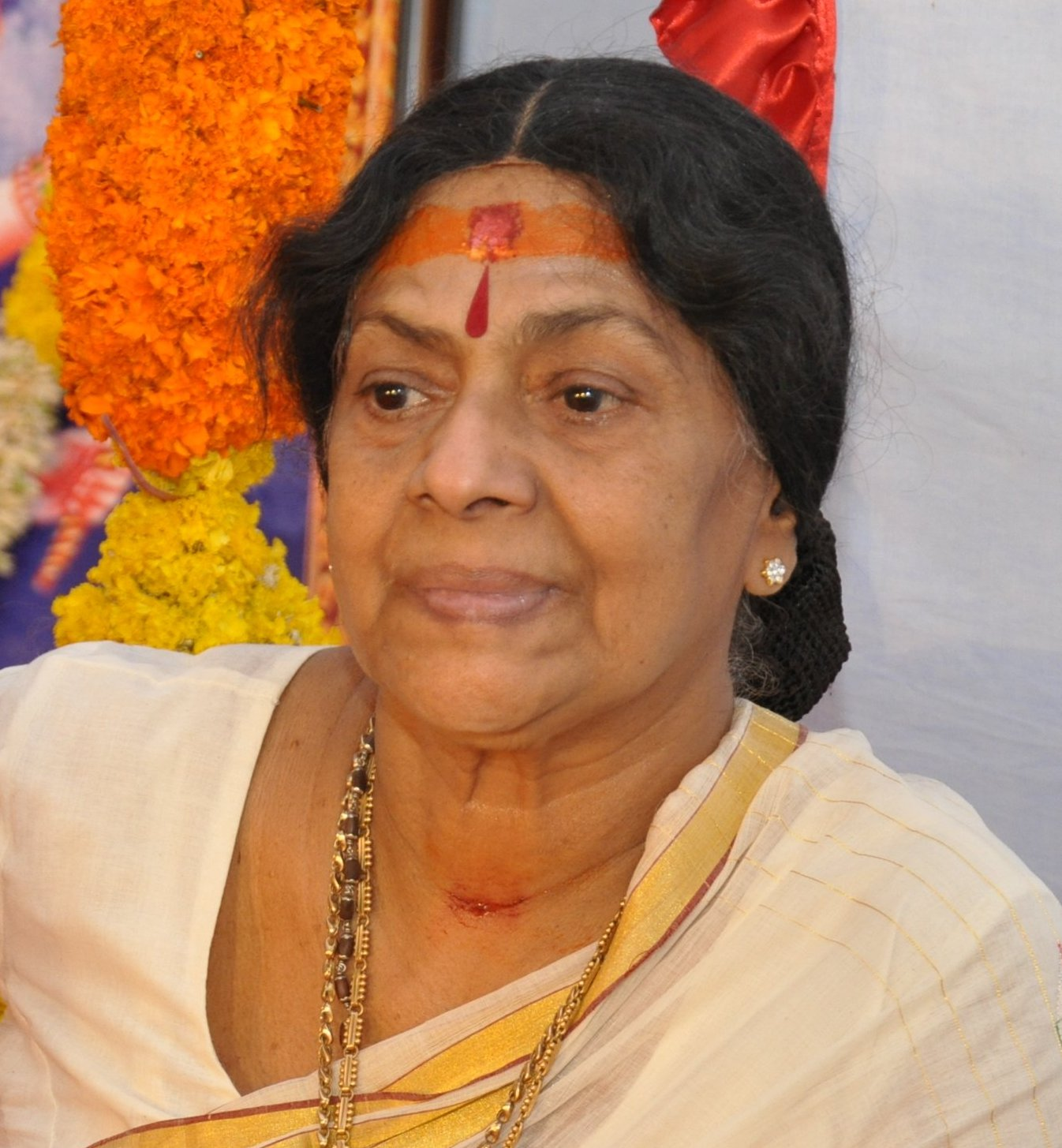
Sukumari

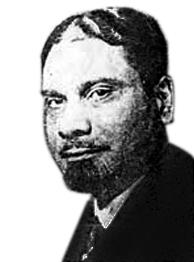
Chempakaraman Pillai

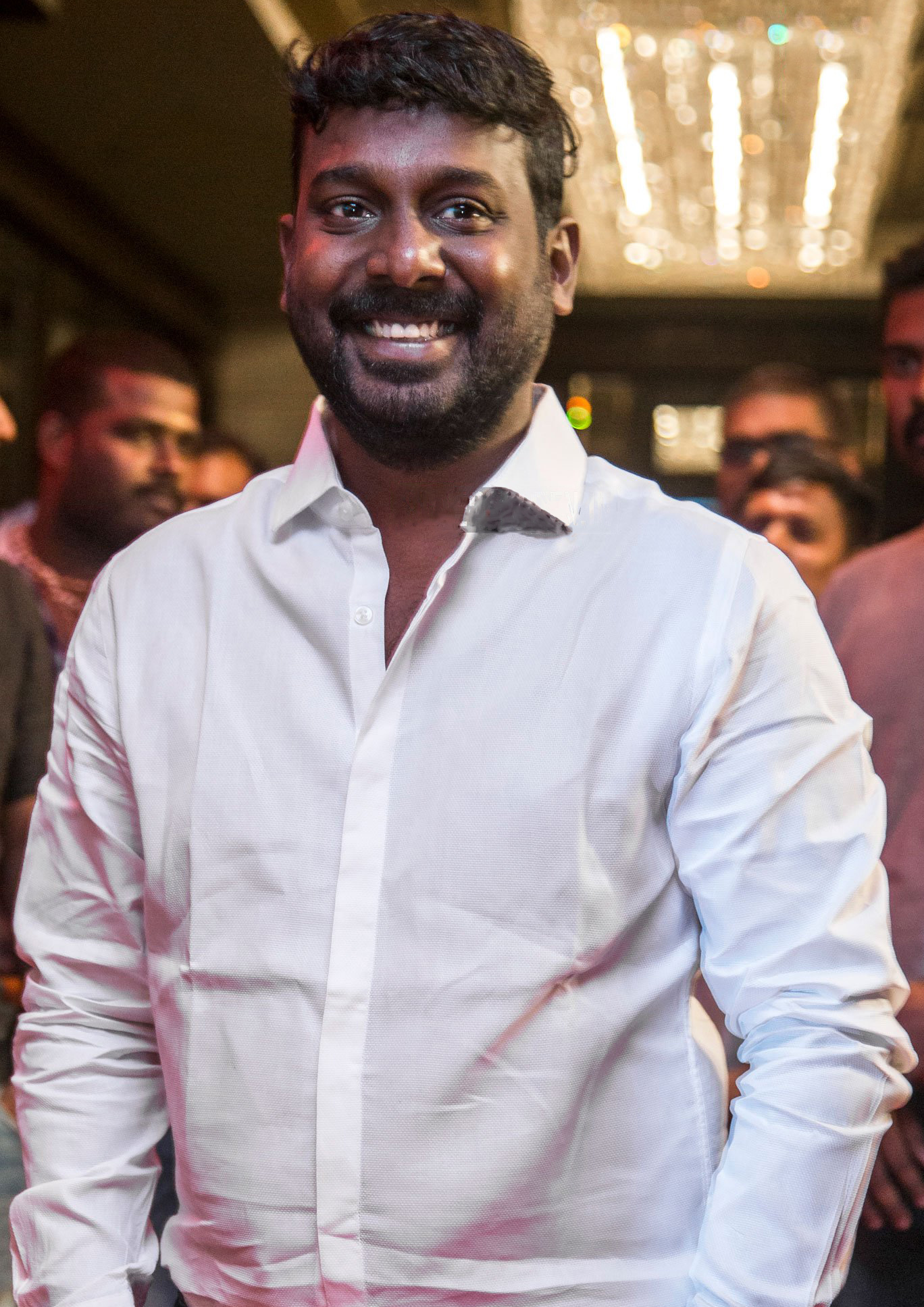
Vijay Vasanth

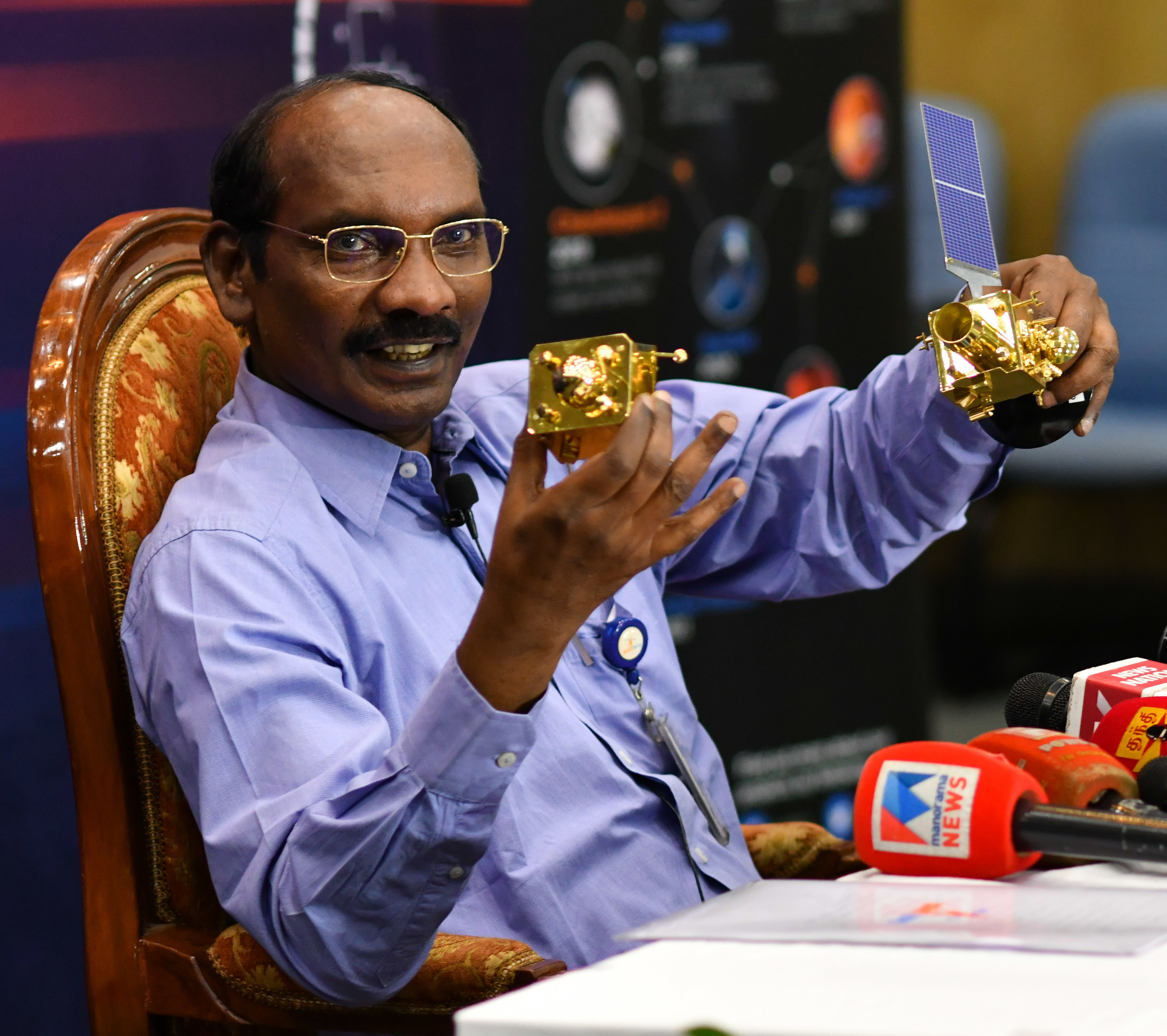
Kailasavadivoo Sivan

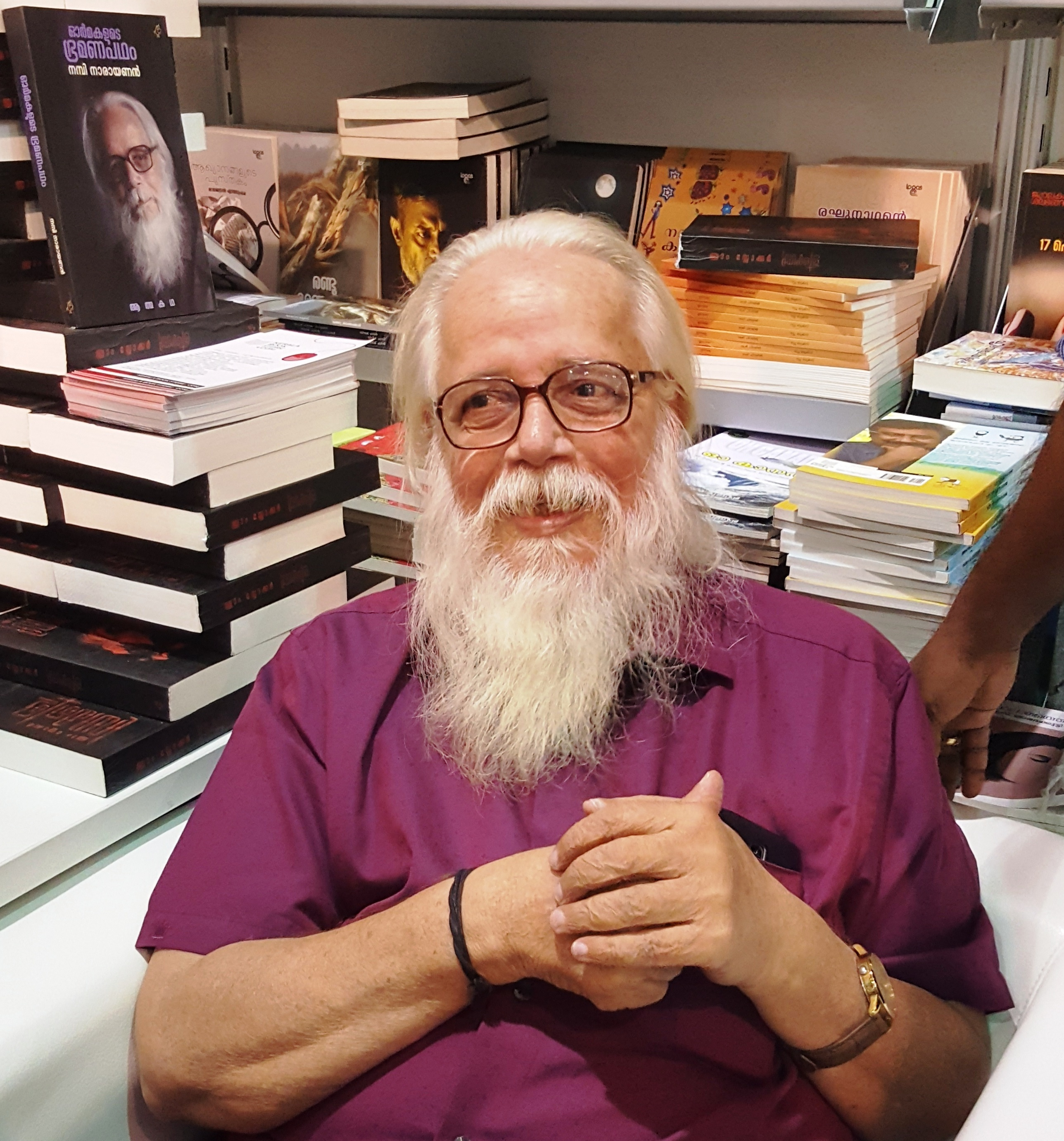
Nambi Narayanan

Nagercoil-born and lived people

== Kings, royals and princesses ==
=== Kings of Travancore ===
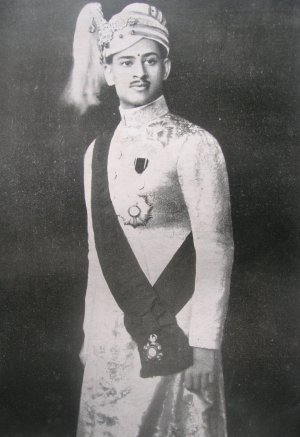
Chithira Thirunal Balarama Varma

- Marthanda Varma Kulasekhara Perumal (1729–1758)
- Balarama Varma Kulasekhara Perumal – Dharma Raja Karthika Thirunal (1758–1798)
- Balarama Varma Kulasekhara Perumal (1798–1810)
- Gouri Laksmibhai Ranee (1810–1815)
- Gouri Parvathibhai Ranee (1815–1829)
- Swathi Thirunal Rama Varma Kulasekhara Perumal (1829–1847)
- Uthram Thirunal Marthanda Varma Maharaja (1847–1860)
- Ayilyam Thirunal Rama Varma Maharaja (1860–1880)
- Visakham Thirunal Rama Varma Maharaja (1880–1885)
- Shri Moolam Thirunal Maharajah (1885–1924)
- Sethu Laksmibhai Ranee (1924–1933)
- Shri Chithira Thirunal Balarama Varma Maharajah (1933–1949) – last King of Travancore; Rajpramukh of Thiru-Kochi

== Government Service ==
=== Reserve Bank of India ===
- S. Venkitaramanan - 18th Governor of the Reserve Bank of India.

=== Navy ===
- Admiral Oscar Stanley Dawson - 12th Chief of Naval Staff of the Indian Navy.
- Admiral Sushil Kumar - 16th Chief of Naval Staff of the Indian Navy.
- Admiral Nilakanta Krishnan - Indo-Pakistani War of 1971.

=== Police ===
- F. V. Arul - 2nd Central Bureau of Investigation Director.
- Walter Devaram - Former Director general of police of Tamil Nadu.
- Christopher Nelson - Former Director general of police of Tamil Nadu.
- G. Nanchil Kumaran - Former Director general of police of Tamil Nadu.
- N. Paramasivan Nair - Former Director general of police of Kerala.
- Joel Davis - Director general of police, Hyderabad.
- Dr.C. Sylendra Babu - Former Director general of police of Tamil Nadu.

=== Chief Justice of State ===
- N. Paul Vasanthakumar - Chief Justice of Jammu & Kashmir (2015-2017).

=== Jurists ===
- Omana Kunjamma - First Indian Women Magistrate.

=== Diplomats ===
- Bijay Selvaraj - Indian Ambassador to UK, Egypt, and Bangladesh.

=== Government Secretaries ===
- Nilakanta Mahadeva AyyarCIE - Former Governor of Bengal and Chief Secretary to the Government of India.
- Y. S. Rajan - Secretary, Department of Space, Indian Space Research Organisation.
- Sheela Balakrishnan - Former Chief Secretary of Tamil Nadu.
- Girija Vaidyanathan - Chief Secretary of Tamil Nadu.
- M. G. Devashagayam - Former Chief Secretary of Haryana.

== Scientists ==
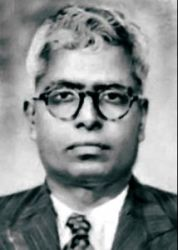
Dr.Subbayya Sivasankaranarayana Pillai inventions in mathematics work are considered to be the very best achievements in Indian Mathematics since Ramanujan

- G.D.Boaz - First Indian psychologist.
- Raja Chelliah - Indian economist and recipient of Padma Vibushan.
- Jivanayakam Cyril Daniel – naturalist and author
- Ranjan Roy Daniel - Indian cosmic-physicist and former director of Tata Institute of Fundamental Research, Recipient of Padma Bhushan.
- Subbayya Sivasankaranarayana Pillai - Indian mathematician and inventor of Pillai's conjecture, Pillai's arithmetical function, Pillai prime, Pillai sequence.
- M.S.S. Pandian - Renowned social scientist and former Dean of Department of Social Science at Jawaharlal Nehru University.
- H. S. S. Lawrence - Special Envoy to Afghanistan.
- C. Livingstone - Indian plant taxonomist.
- Kolappa Kanakasabhapathy Pillay - Indian historian and former dean at University of Madras.
- Ajayan Vinu - Indian material scientist and professor University of Queensland.

=== Defence Research and Development Organisation ===
- A. Sivathanu Pillai - Former chairman of DRDO.
- S. Christopher - Chairman of DRDO.

=== Indian Space Research Organisation ===
- G. Madhavan Nair - 6th Chairman (2003-2009)
- Kailasavadivoo Sivan - 10th Chairman of Indian Space Research Organisation
- Nambi Narayanan - Aerospace Scientist and Founder of Cryogenic Engine in India.

== Entertainment ==
=== Film, television, theater, and dance ===
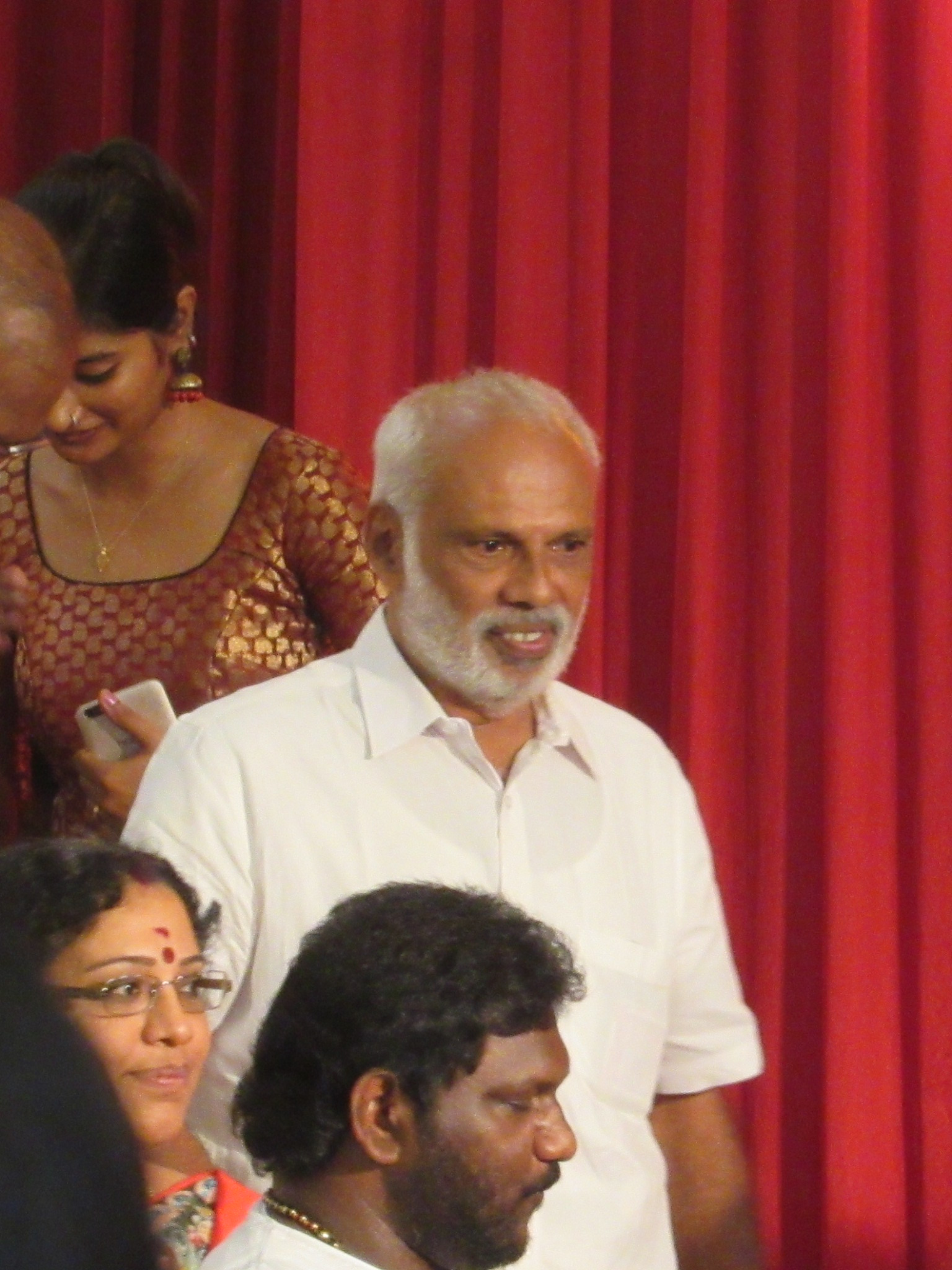
Gopakumaran Nair Mathar Ramakrishnan Nair (a.k.a.) M.R.Gopakumar, Renowned Indian theater artist.

- Azhagam Perumal - Indian Actor
- Sathyan - First Malayalam film superstar.
- Sukumari - Indian film actress.
- Manju Warrier - Malayalam film actress.
- Madhavan Nair - Malayalam film actor.
- J. C. Daniel - Father of Malayalam film industry.
- Thikkurissy Sukumaran Nair - Malayalam film director.
- Nyla Usha - Malayalam film actress.
- Manu Ramesan - Indian film composer.
- M. Rajesh - Tamil film director.
- K. R. Ramsingh - Indian theater artist.
- M. R. Gopakumar - Renowned Indian theater artist.
- Deepti Omchery Bhalla - Indian Mohiniattam dance exponent.
- Padmesh - Indian cinematographer.
- Vijay Vasanth - Indian actor.
- Menaka Suresh - Indian actress.
- Bala Singh - Indian actor
- Aarav - Indian Actor

=== Comedians, humorists, and entertainers ===
- N. S. Krishnan - Tamil actor.
- Kanal Kannan - Renowned Indian action choreographer, stunt co-ordinator.

=== Musicians ===
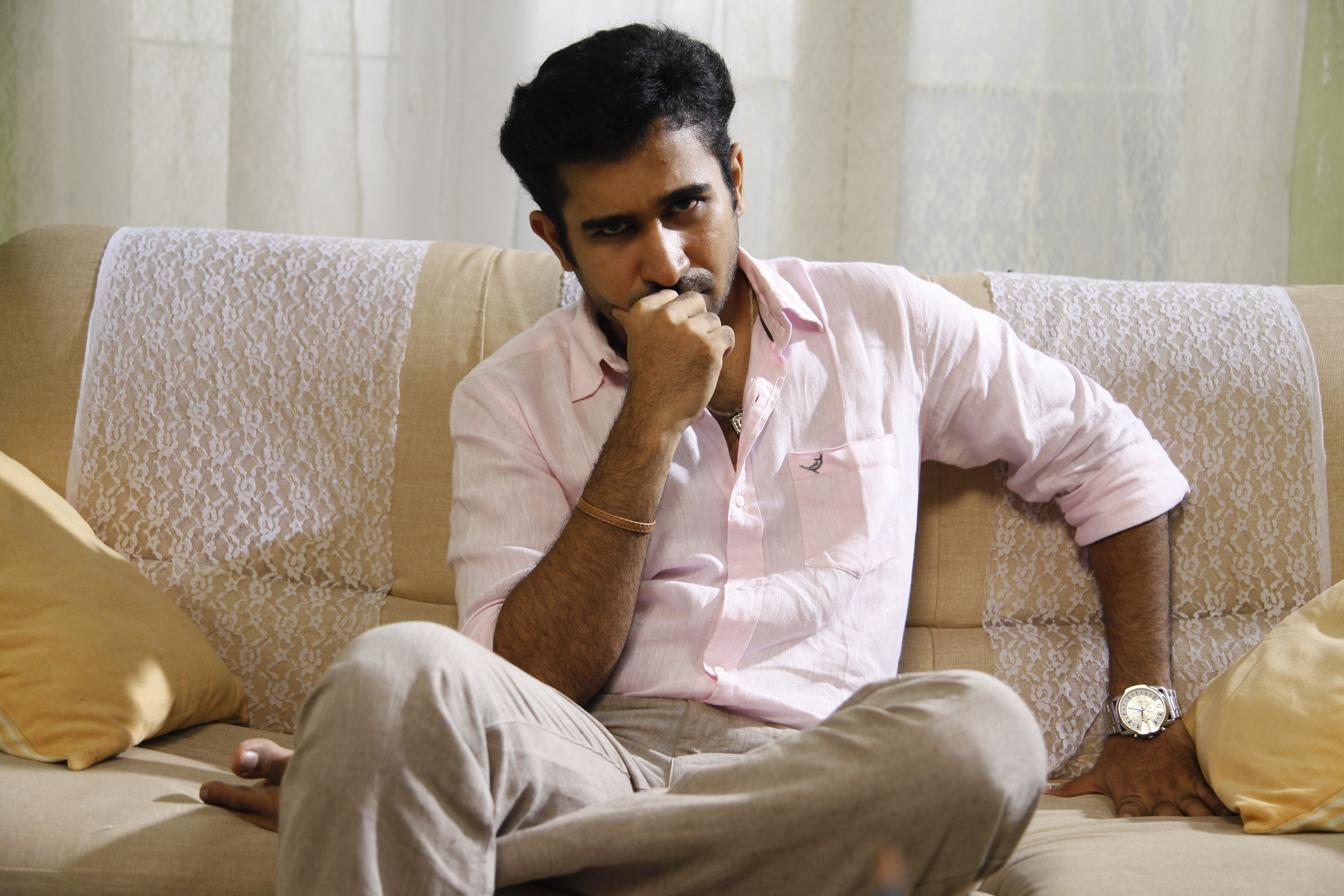
Vijay Antony

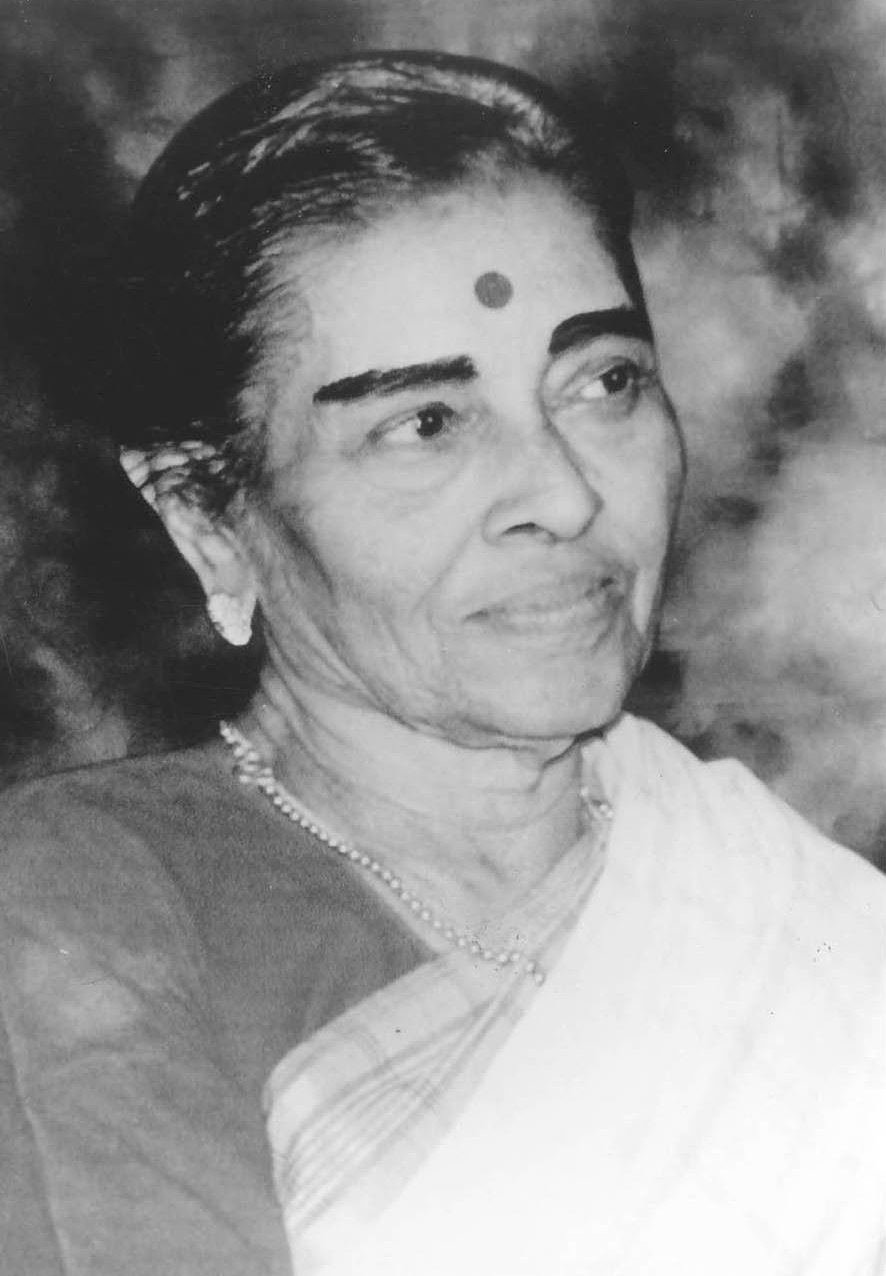
Classical Singer Leela Omcherry.

- Vishwas Nicholas - Singer/Songwriter/Composer (Guinness World Record Holder).

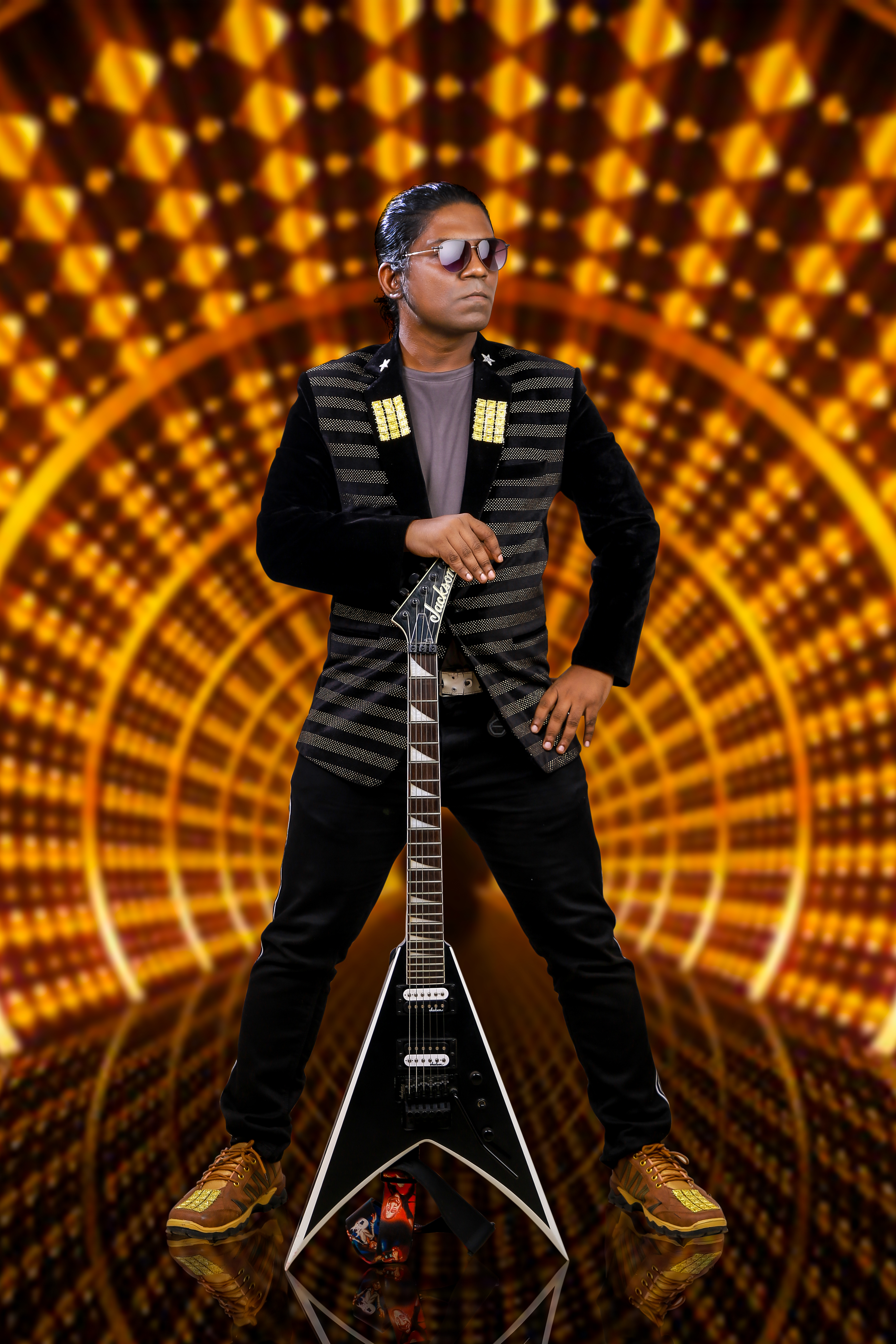

- Vijay Antony - Indian music composer, playback singer.
- K.V. Mahadevan - Composer; winner of the National Film Award for Best Music Direction (1968 & 1980).
- Neelakanta Sivan - Carnatic music composer.
- Nagercoil S. Ganesa Iyer - Prominent Carnatic musician and exponent.
- Leela Omchery - Indian classical singer, musicologist and writer.
- Nagercoil Harihara Iyer - Indian violinist.
- Bhoothapandi Arunachalam Chidambaranathan - Indian film composer and musician.
- Kamukara Purushothaman - Indian playback singer.
- R. Muttusamy - Sri lankan musician and singer.
- Neyyattinkara Vasudevan - Carnatic music vocalist.
- Poongani, Veteran villupaattu exponent.

== Art, literature, journalism, and philosophy ==
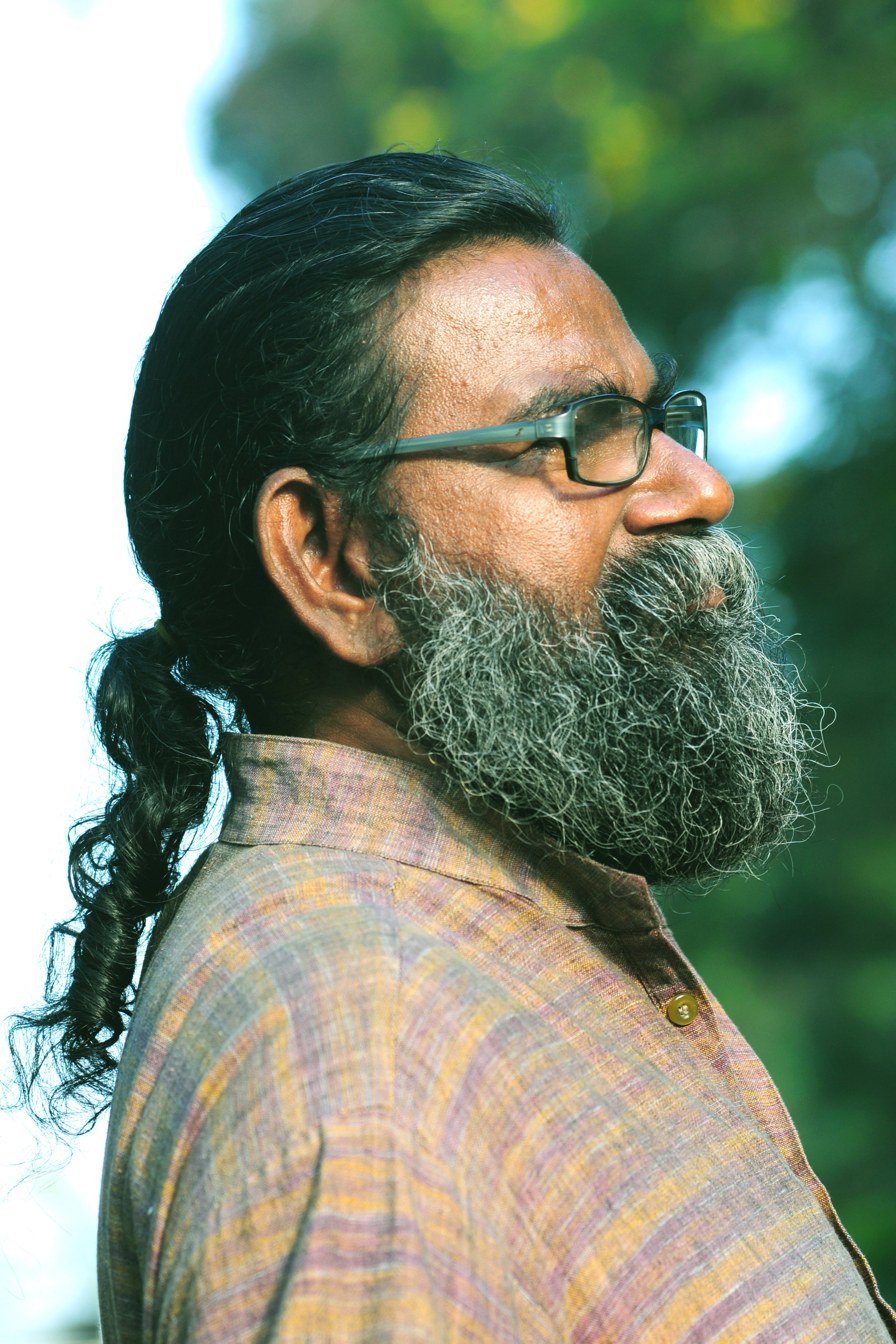
Rajasekharan Parameswaran, Renowned Indian Paint and art director.

- Kavimani Desigavinayagam Pillai - Tamil Renaissance poet.
- Thirunainar Kurichi Madhavan Nair - Renowned Indian poet, novelist and lyricist.
- T. V. Ramasubbaiyer - Founder of Indian Daily Newspaper Dinamalar.
- Amsi Narayanapilla - Renowned Malayalam Poet.
- T. N. Gopakumar - Editor in chief of Asianet News
- Aiyappan Pillai - Renowned Malayalam Author.
- Neela Padmanabhan - Indian writer and 2007 recipient of Sahitya Akademi Award.
- Nanjil Nadan - Indian writer and 2010 recipient of Sahitya Akademi Award.
- T. M. Chidambara Ragunathan - Indian writer and 1983 recipient of Sahitya Akademi Award.
- Thoppil Mohamed Meeran - Indian writer and 1997 recipient of Sahitya Akademi Award.
- Ponneelan - Indian writer and 1994 recipient of Sahitya Akademi Award.
- Rajasekharan Parameswaran - Indian painter.
- David Davidar - English novelist.
- B. Jeyamohan - Indian writer and literary critic.
- S. Ramesan Nair - Indian poet.
- Aravindan Neelakandan - Indian columnist at Swarajya

== Entrepreneurs and businessmen ==
- H. Vasanthakumar - Founder and director of Vasanth & Co.

== Environmentalists ==
- Jivanayakam Cyril Daniel - Indian naturalist.
- A. J. T. Johnsingh - Former director of Wildlife Institute of India.
- S. S. Davidson - Indian environmentalist.

== Sports ==
- Ramanathan Krishnan - Retired Indian tennis player and Wimbledon semifinalist in 1960 & 1961.
- Thalaivan Sargunam - Indian cricketer.
- Antony Dhas - Indian cricketer.
