= List of Scott Christian College alumni =

Scott Christian College, Nagercoil alumni are often referred to as Scotians, a name derived from its Scottish founder's initial Old English name. The list of Scott Christian College pupils, featuring members of the University of Cambridge, are segregated in accordance with their fields of achievement. This list includes individuals who have either studied at the university or worked at the university in an academic capacity.

The list has been divided into categories indicating the field of activity in which people have become well known. Many of the university’s alumni have attained a level of distinction in more than one field. These individuals may appear under two categories. In general, however, an attempt has been made to put individuals in the category with which they are most often associated.

== Scientists ==
- Dr. D.J. Bagyaraj - senior scientist, Indian Institute of Science, Bangalore
- Dr. Gunamudian David Boaz - first Indian psychologist
- Dr. J Daniel Chellappa - nuclear scientist; Deputy Director of Department of Atomic Energy
- Dr. Raja Chelliah - economist; former advisor to World Bank
- Dr. Selvin Christopher - director of Centre for Airborne Systems, Defence Research and Development Organisation; recipient of Padma Shri
- Dr. Ranjan Roy Daniel - former director of Tata Institute of Fundamental Research; recipient of Padma Bhushan
- Dr. C. Livingstone - biological scientist; former Chancellor of Madras Christian College
- Dr. A.E. Muthunayagam - former director of Indian Space Research Organisation and Indian Institute of Technology Madras; recipient of Padma Bhushan
- Dr. M.S.S. Pandian - veteran Indian historian and social scientist
- Dr. Samuel Paul - founder and former director of Indian Institute of Management Ahmedabad
- Dr. M. J. Xavier - founder and director of Indian Institute of Management Ranchi

== Mathematicians ==
- Dr. Subbayya Sivasankaranarayana Pillai - mathematician; recipient of Padma Bhushan

== Indian police service ==
- Dr. F. V. Arul (IPS) - former Director of Central Bureau of Investigation; Commissioner of Police (Greater Chennai); first Indian Vice-President of Interpol
- Dr.C. Sylendra Babu - present Director-General of Police, Tamil Nadu
- Dr. Walter Devaram - former Inspector-General of Police; Indian Super Cop and Padma Shri awardee
- G. Nanchil Kumaran - former Inspector-General of Police and Police Commissioner, Chennai
- Christopher Nelson - former Inspector-General of Police; lifetime member of Planning Commission

== Indian administrative service ==
- Thiru Anand T - Project Officer DRDA, Tamil Nadu Government
- Thiru P. Ekambaram - Managing Director of Tamil Nadu Water Board
- Thiru V.M. Xavier Chrisso Nayagam - Director of Social Welfare to Government of Tamil Nadu
- Thiru S. Thangaswami - Commissioner, Minorities Welfare to Government of India
- Dr. R. Vijaykumar - Additional Chief Secretary to Government of India

=== Chief of Naval Staff ===
- Admiral Oscar Stanley Dawson - 12th Chief of Naval Staff
- Admiral Sushil Kumar - 18th Chief of Naval Staff

== Cinema ==
- J. C. Daniel - "father of the Malayalam film industry"
- Ganesh Janardhanan (VTV Ganesh) - Tamil comedian and actor
- Rani Jeyraj - Miss India, 1996
- R. Muttusamy - "the father of the Sri Lankan film industry"
- Sathyaneshan Nadar - Malayalam actor
- Jagathy N. K. Achary - Malayalam Script Writer
- Sukumaran - Malayalam actor

== Educationalists ==
- Dr. H. S. S. Lawrence - former Director of Education, India; UNESCO Adviser

== Politicians ==
- A.V. Bellarmin - former Lok Sabha member
- J. Helen Davidson - current Lok Sabha member
- Dr. N. Dennis, former and seven-time Lok Sabha member
- Nanjil K. Manoharan - co-founder of Dravida Munnetra Kazhagam (DMK)
- Kunjan Nadar - former Lok Sabha member
- Dr. Marshal Nesamony, former Lok Sabha member

== Authors and poets ==
- Dr. David Davidar - former CEO of Penguin Group; Harvard University faculty
- Dr. M. J. Rabi Singh - linguistic scholar

== Environmentalists ==
- Dr. J. C. Daniel - ornithologist and naturalist
- S. S. Davidson - environmentalist
- Dr. A.J.T. Johnsingh - scientist, former director of the Wildlife Institute of India

== Theology ==
- Gnanasigamony Devakadasham - Bishop of the largest Indian church, Church of South India
- John Gladstone - former Bishop of Church of South India

== Sports ==
- W. Antony Dhas - cricketer
- Thalaivan Sargunam - cricketer and Sunrisers Hyderabad batsman
