= M. Vincent (Tamil Nadu politician) =

Member of Tamil Nadu Legislative Assembly
- In office 1977–1984
- Preceded by: M. Moses
- Succeeded by: S. Retnaraj
- Constituency: Nagercoil

Personal details
- Born: Nagercoil
- Party: All India Anna Dravida Munnetra Kazhagam
- Profession: Lawyer

M. Vincent is an Indian politician and former member of the Tamil Nadu Legislative Assembly. He is from Kandanvilai in Nagercoil. He completed his schooling at St. Lawrence Higher Secondary School, Madathattuvilai. He earned his undergraduate degree from Scott Christian College, Nagercoil, and pursued a Bachelor of Law degree at Madras Law College, Chennai. A member of the All India Anna Dravida Munnetra Kazhagam (AIADMK), he contested and won elections from the Nagercoil Assembly constituency in the Tamil Nadu Legislative Assembly in 1977 and 1980, becoming an MLA.Tamil Nadu Legislative Assembly.

== Electoral performance ==
=== 1977 ===
1977 Tamil Nadu Legislative Assembly election: Nagercoil
Party	Candidate	Votes	%	±%
AIADMK	M. Vincent	26,973	36.45	New
JP	P. Muhammed Ismail	26,780	36.19	New
DMK	G. C. Michael Raj	12,824	17.33	−30.01
INC	M. A. James	6,721	9.08	New
Independent	Poomedai S. Lakshmanan Pillay	409	0.55	New
Margin of victory		193	0.26	−0.49
Turnout		73,994	56.00	−17.75
Registered electors		132,870		
AIADMK gain from SWA		Swing	-11.63	

=== 1980 ===
1980 Tamil Nadu Legislative Assembly election: Nagercoil
Party	Candidate	Votes	%	±%
AIADMK	M. Vincent	39,328	54.76	+18.3
DMK	A. Thiraviam	30,045	41.83	+24.5
JP	A. Kuruzmichcal	1,512	2.11	New
BJP	M. R. Gandhi	693	0.96	New
Margin of victory		9,283	12.92	12.66
Turnout		71,824	55.42	−0.58
Registered electors		130,424		
AIADMK hold		Swing	18.30	
