= Christopher Nelson =

Christopher Nelson may refer to:

- Christopher Nelson (make-up artist), American makeup artist
- Christopher Nelson (police officer), Indian Police Service officer
- Christopher Nelson (field hockey), player in 2005 Men's EuroHockey Nations Championship squads

== See also ==
- Chris Nelson (disambiguation)
