= Villukuri =

Village in South India

Coordinates: 8°14′02″N 77°22′13″E

Villukuri is a small village in Kanyakumari district, Tamil Nadu, India.

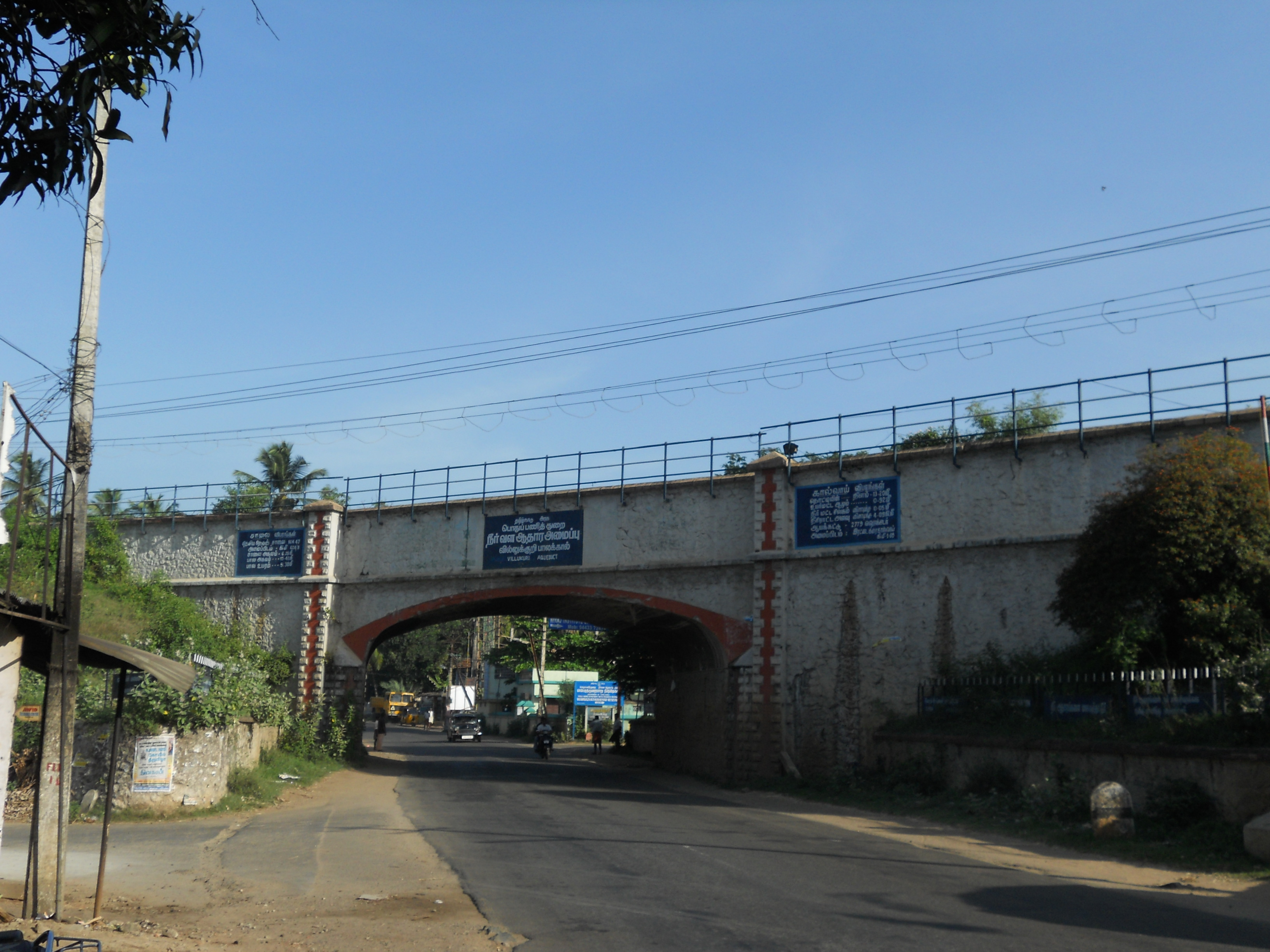

== Demographics ==
As identified in the 2011 Indian census, Villukuri was divided into 15 wards. The Villukuri Panchayat has a population of 15,304, in which 7,534 were males and 7,770 were females.

The population of children between the ages of 0-6 was 1,525, 9.96% of the total population. The female sex ratio was 1,031 while the state average was about 996. Moreover, the child sex ratio was 890 compared to the Tamil Nadu state average of 943. The literacy rate was 90.52% which was higher than the state average of 80.09%. In Villukuri, male literacy was around 92.73% while the female literacy rate about 88.41%.

Postal code 629180

== History ==
Villukuri was once used as an Army Training Camp in the Travancore Kingdom. "Villu" meaning "arrow" while "Kuri" meaning "aiming it". Villukuri was the place where Marthandavarma stored weapons for the Battle of Colachel.

Villukuri Fort was used for training soldiers. After a defeat by the Dutch, captain Dilenoy trained the Travancore army in this fort with specific training on the use of cannons, guns, etc. The fort fell into ruins due to lack of protective measures by the government.

Villages in Villukuri
Village Name	Special Notes	
Villukuri Junction	A famous st. Sebastian kurusady is located	
Villukury RC Street & Simon Nagar	A small village, Known for Fish market and evening market. St. Alosious church is the Sub parish of St. Sebastian church, Madathattuvilai	
	Thiruvidaikode	Famous for the Lord Siva Temple called Chadaiyappar temple.
Madathattuvilai	Madam stands for Houses, known for the St.Sebastian Church and the Kurusadi	
Kuthiraipanthivilai	Stands for Horse resting area.	
Karavilai,	A small village in the Villukuri panchayat, known for its 300 years ancient Sri Bathrakali temple and once in 12 years, the temple celebrates the festival in a grand manner. Villukuri(saralvilai) has a famous Sudalai Madan Swami temple called The Mother Temple for all other Sudalai Madan Swami temples situated around Saralvilai. In Villukuri, there is a Siva Temple called the "Chadaiyappar temple".	
Kulumaikadu	A small village in villukuri panjayath. Famous temple's Sri sakthi vinayagar temple, Sri Bramasakthi Amman temple, sriman Narayanaswami Temple.	
Melapallam		
Keelapallam		
Villukuri(saralvilai)	A famous Sudalai Madan Swami temple called The Mother Temple for all other Sudalai Madan Swami temples situated around Saralvilai, also has famous Siva Temple called the Chadaiyappar temple. On Sivalaya Ottam is an additional temple. Kumara Kovil and the great Murugan temple are also nearby.	

== Education ==
Villukuri hosts many schools:

- St. Lawrence Higher Secondary School, Madathattuvilai
- Adline Matric Higher Secondary School, Madathattuvilai & kuzhumaikadu.
- St. Aloysious Primary School, Madathattuvilai
- Government Higher Secondary School, Villukuri
- GPS, L.M. Gps. Area School, Villukuri
- GPS School - Villukuri
- New National Nursery & Primary School, Villukuri
- Theresa Nursery & Primary School, Villukuri
- St.Sebastian Matriculation School, Madathattuvilai
- St.Sebastian Computer Education, Madathattuvilai
- Mother Gnanamma Catholic College of Education, Madathattuvilai
- Viyakula Annai Primary School, Konnakuzhivilai
- Desiya Vidya Kindergarten, Nursery & Primary School, Villukuri

== Facilities ==
Other facilities include:

- Ezhil Theatre (estd in 1982, now Ezhil Thirumana Mandapam (Heritage Centre))
- Mampalaithuriaru Reservoir
- SBI Bank Villukuri branch (with ATM)
- Ezhil Thirumana Mandapam( First established marriage hall in villukuri, serves the surrounding people)
- TATA Indicash ATM (With two ATMs)
- KDCC Co-operative society also serves the people around
- Post office
- Saint Sebastian Benefit Fund Limited
- Market (Very big Fish market runs by St. Sebastian church parish, Madathattuvilai and St. Alosious church parish, Villukury which serves the surrounding villagers)
