= Chris Nelson =

Chris Nelson may refer to:

- Chris Nelson (American politician) (born 1964), Secretary of State of South Dakota
- Chris Nelson (British politician), Gloucestershire Police and Crime Commissioner
- Chris Nelson (baseball) (born 1985), third baseman
- Chris Nelson (photographer) (1960–2006), co-founder of Bear magazine
- Chris Nelson (wrestler) (born 1974), American wrestler
- Chris Nelson (field hockey), Scottish field hockey player

== See also ==
- Christopher Nelson (disambiguation)
- Chris Nielsen (disambiguation)
