= Chris Nielsen (disambiguation) =

Chris Nielsen (born 1980) is a Canadian ice hockey player.

- Chris Nielsen (politician) (born 1967), member of the Legislative Assembly of Alberta
- Chris Nielsen (singer) (born 1955), Canadian country singer
- Christopher Nielsen (born 1963), Norwegian artist
- Christopher Feldborg Nielsen (born 1992), Swedish golfer

== See also ==
- Chris Nilsen (born 1998), American athlete specialising in pole vault and high jump
- Chris Nilsson (born 1947), New Zealand rower
- Chris Nelson (disambiguation)
