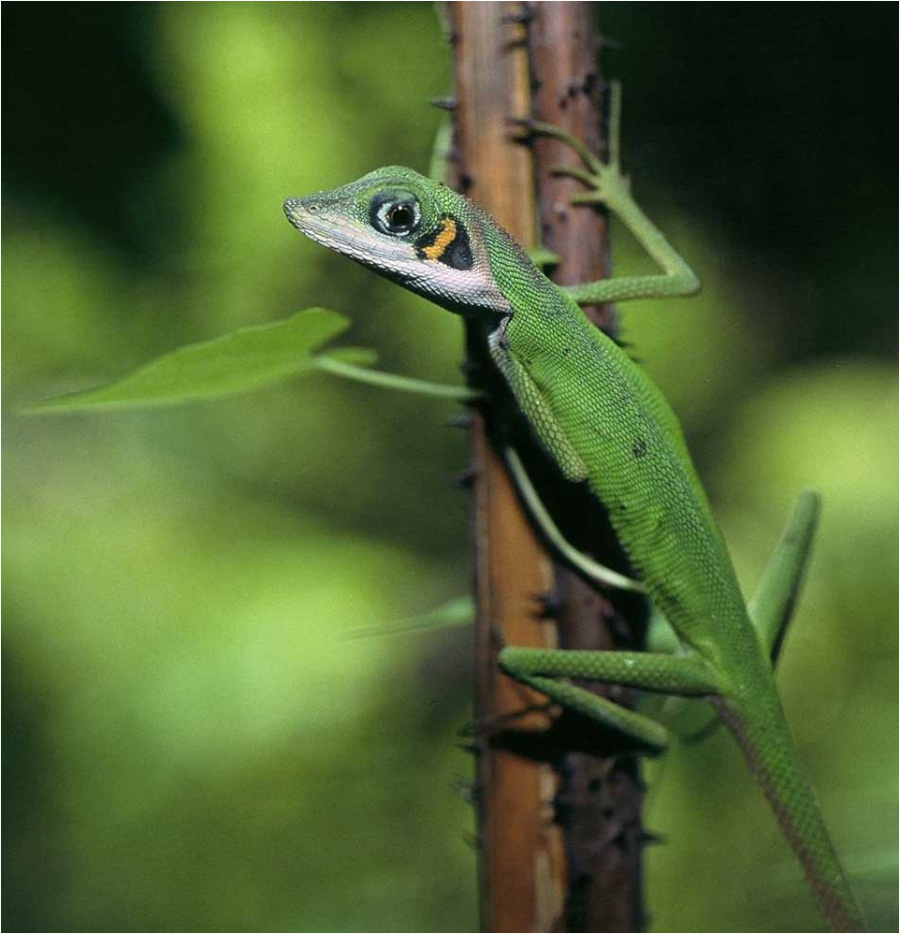
- Bronchocela danieli from Great Nicobar Island

Conservation status
- Least Concern (IUCN 3.1)

Scientific classification
- Kingdom: Animalia
- Phylum: Chordata
- Class: Reptilia
- Order: Squamata
- Suborder: Iguania
- Family: Agamidae
- Genus: Bronchocela
- Species: B. danieli

Binomial name
- Bronchocela danieli (Tiwari & Biswas, 1973)

Synonyms
- Calotes danieli Tiwari & Biswas, 1973; Bronchocela danieli — Moody, 1980

= Bronchocela danieli =

Species of lizard

Bronchocela danieli, also known commonly as Daniel's bloodsucker and Daniel's forest lizard, is a species of lizard in the family Agamidae. The species is endemic to Campbell Bay, Great Nicobar Island, India.

== Etymology ==
The specific name, danieli, is in honor of Indian naturalist Jivanayakam Cyril "J.C." Daniel.

== Habitat ==
The preferred natural habitat of B. danieli is forest.

== Behavior ==
B. danieli is arboreal.

== Reproduction (babies) ==
B. danieli is oviparous.

They are colour changing according to their surroundings.
