= D.J. Bagyaraj =

Indian scientist

D. J. Bagyaraj
- Occupation(s): Senior.Scientist, University of Agricultural Sciences, Bangalore

Davis Joseph Bagyaraj is an Indian scientist with the University of Agricultural Sciences, Bangalore and the Vice Director of National Biodiversity Authority, Ministry of Environment and Forests, Government of India. He is also an author for various research publications.
