= Ranjan Roy Daniel =

Indian physicist

- Born: 11 August 1923; Nagercoil, British India
- Died: 27 March 2005 (aged 81) Nagercoil, Tamil Nadu, India
- Education: Scott Christian College; University of Bristol
- Occupations: Dean, Department of Physics, Tata Institute of Fundamental Research
- Spouse: Serena Padmini
- Children: 4

Ranjan Roy Daniel (also referred to as R. R. Daniel or Rajan Roy) (11 August 1923 – 27 March 2005) was an Indian physicist who worked in the fields of cosmic rays and space physics, and remained Director Chairman of Tata Institute of Fundamental Research. He also served as an advisor to the prime minister of India, Indira Gandhi in 1976. He worked in the field of cosmic rays with Homi Jehangir Bhabha for 23 years.

He was awarded the Padma Bhushan in 1992 by the Government of India, for his contributions to science and engineering.

== Early life and education ==
Daniel was born on 11 August 1923 in Nagercoil to M.A. Daniel Nadar and Theresa Chellammal Daniel. He was the third of five siblings. He received his early and secondary education at Scott Christian Higher Secondary School in his hometown, Nagercoil. After completing secondary school in 1939 from Scott Christian College, he went on to pursue a BSc in physics from Loyola College, Chennai, the University of Madras. Under the influence of the Indian Nobel laureate Chandrasekhara Venkata Raman he was advised to pursue the next phase of his education at Banaras Hindu University, from which he received MSc (Physics) degree in 1946.

== Career ==
He joined Tata Institute of Fundamental Research (TIFR) in 1947 as a scientist. From there he was sponsored by the Indian government to carry out research studies in the UK at the University of Bristol in 1951. He carried out research in the H. H. Wills Physics Laboratory, headed by the Nobel laureate C. F. Powell, using nuclear emulsions exposed to cosmic rays at high altitudes. He completed his PhD research under Donald Hill Perkins in April 1953. He went on to TIFR throughout till his retirement in 1988.

He was made a Fellow of the Indian National Science Academy (INSA) in 1975, and was awarded the Vainu Bappu Award in 1992.

== Personal life ==
He married Serena Padmini, second daughter of G.M. Samuel and Annammal Samuel, in 1948, and the couple had four children. After his retirement he returned to Nagercoil and lived in his daughter Lalitha's house. He was affectionately known as a simple man, and very few knew of his remarkable accomplishments. He died on 27 March 2005 after a prolonged illness. He is survived by 4 children (Lalitha, Ravindran, Amudha and Renjitha) and several grandchildren, all of whom live in the USA and India.
