= Ajayan Vinu =

Indian scientist (born 1976)

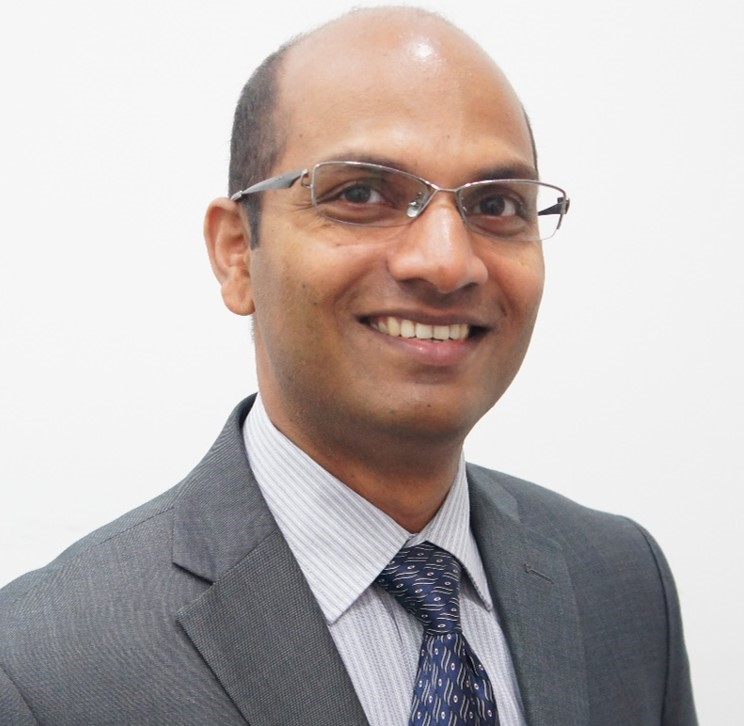
- Vinu in 2016
- Born: 20 May 1976 (age 50)
- Education: Anna University; Kaiserslautern University of Technology; Manonmaniam Sundaranar University
- Known for: Mesoporous carbon nitride
- Spouse: Siji Dhasan (married in 2005)
- Children: Two sons - Stevin Vinu and Nivets Vinu
- Scientific career
- Fields: Materials science and Nanotechnology
- Workplaces: The University of Newcastle

Ajayan Vinu is a material scientist. He is currently the Global Innovation Chair Professor for Advanced Nanomaterials and the director of Global Innovative Centre for Advanced Nanomaterials (GICAN), The University of Newcastle since October 2017 which houses more than 60 researchers including PhD students and staff. Before moving to the University of Newcastle, he was a professor of Nanomaterials at the University of South Australia from 2015–2017. and also worked at the University of Queensland as a Professor and ARC Future Fellow from 2011–2015. He is well known in the field of mesoporous carbon nitride and was the first one to introduce porosity in carbon nitride materials which find applications in different areas of research including catalysis, energy storage and conversion and carbon dioxide capture, and photocatalytic water splitting for hydrogen generation.

== Early life and education ==
Ajayan Vinu was born in a small village located at the extreme South of India called Arumanai in Kanyakumari district in Tamil Nadu, India. He received his Bachelor's and master's degrees in chemistry from Manonmaniam Sundaranar University (MSU) in Tirunelveli district, India (1993–1998). He received his PhD degree in 2003 from Anna University, India, however, he carried out most of his PhD thesis work at Kaiserslautern University of Technology, Germany.

== Research career ==
In 2004 he moved to the National Institute for Materials Science (NIMS), Japan as an International Young Scientist fellow. He has published more than 500 papers in journals with ca. 35,300 citations and an H-index of 97 (google scholar). He is a fellow of the Royal Society of Chemistry. In 2018, he was elected as a fellow of the World Academy of Art and Science and an academician of the World Academy of Ceramics. In 2019, he was elected as an academician of the Asia-Pacific Academy of Materials.

During his tenure at NIMS, he was appointed as the NIMS Ambassador to India, and was instrumental in setting up the NIMS-India research centre at Indian Institute of Chemical Technology and appointed to serve as a Research Director for this Center.

== Awards and honors ==
- Academician, Asia-Pacific Academy of Materials (2019)
- Medal, Chemical Research Society of India (2018)
- Fellow, World Academy of Arts and Science 2018
- Fellow, Royal Society of Chemistry 2013
- Academician, World Academy of Ceramics, 2017
- Fellow, Royal Australian Chemical Institute 2017
- Foreign Fellow Award Maharashtra Academy of Sciences 2015
- Scopus Young Researcher Award- Elsevier 2014
- ARC Future Fellowship Award 2010
- Bessel Humboldt Award (2010)
- CSJ Young Chemist Award (2010)
- Award of Excellence from Indian Society of Chemists and Biologists(2009)
- Khwarizmi International Award for applied research at 21st session in 2008 alongside Prof C. N. R. Rao who received this award for innovation
