= St. Sebastian Church, Madathattuvilai =

St.Sebastian Church
- St.Sebastian Church, Madathattuvilai
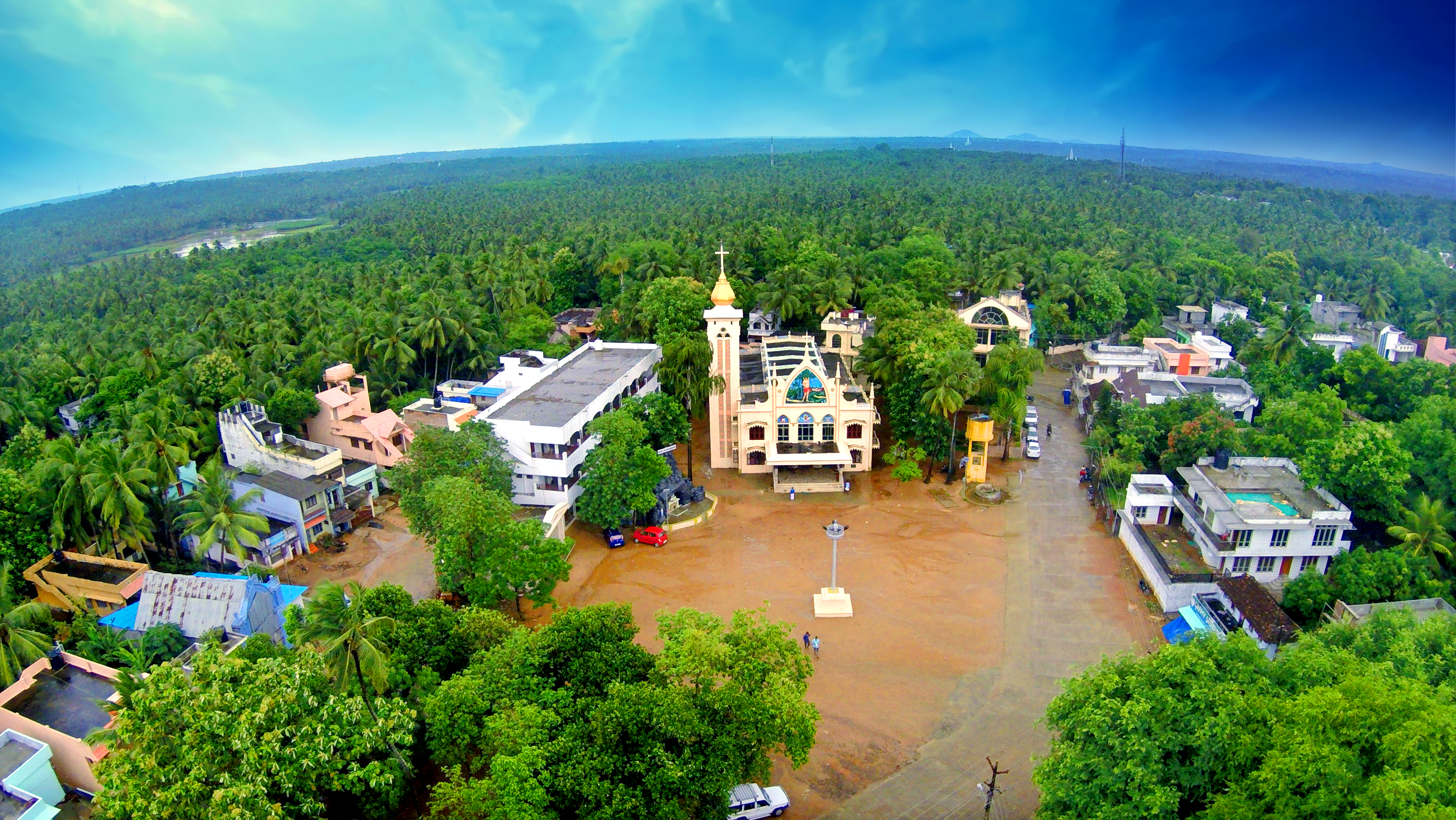
- Aerial View Of St.Sebastian Church, Madathattuviali

- 8.2196°N 77.3469°E
- Location: Madathattuvilai, Tamil Nadu
- Country: India
- Denomination: Roman Catholic Latin Rite
- Website: http://www.madathattuvilai.com/

History
- Dedication: St.Sebastian Pray For Us
- Consecrated: 1890

Architecture
- Functional status: Active

Administration
- Diocese: Kuzhithurai

Clergy
- Bishop(s): Albert George Alexander Anastas, Indian Roman Catholic cleric, Bishop of Kuzhithurai
- Priest: Rev. Fr. S.Maria Rajendran

St. Sebastian Church, Madathattuvilai is a Catholic Church located at Kanyakumari, Tamil Nadu, India. This church is famous for eye donation, with the help of the church youth group the church manages it in an organised manner around its village and nearby villages.

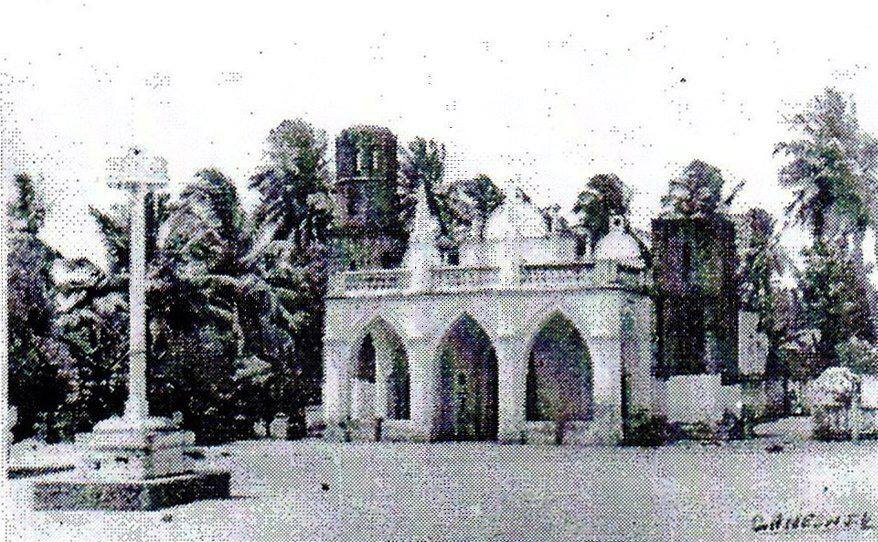
St.Sebastian Church, Madathattuvilai During 1890
