= S. S. Davidson =

- Born: Nagercoil, India
- Occupations: Author, environmentalist, conservationist

S. S. Davidson is one of the pioneer educators of the environmental movement in Tamil Nadu, India. Davidson was born at Nagercoil in Kanyakumari District, India. He earned a degree in English from Scott Christian College, after which he joined as faculty in English. He completed his Master's Degree and Master of Philosophy in English from Annamalai University

At Nagercoil, he started a Tribal Foundation club that would form the genesis of campus-based nature conservation activities and Awareness among the Tribal populace of the Western Ghat Hills of Southern Tamil Nadu. The club also became involved in studying threats to the environment. Additionally, Davidson also leads the movement against the Hill quarry, and the conversion of paddy fields, wetlands, lakes and other pristine water bodies of the former South Travancore that was later renamed to Kanyakumari District. His activity in preserving the turtle and other coastal biodiversity is applauded by many conservationist across Southern India. He is credited with drawing up a plan to preserve the heritage wetlands of Nagercoil and the Suchindram Theroor Birds Sanctuary Wetland Complex. He is also known to track bird migration patterns and study indigenous bird species of a given landscape or geography. His authentic work on the extinction and near extinction of certain bird species from the bio-diverse rich landscapes of Nagercoil is a must read for amateur ornithologists.

The campaign for saving the Travancore Star Tortoise from the brink of extinction is being spearheaded by him. In March 2014, close to 2000 Olive Ridley Sea Turtle eggs were released into the Arabian Sea along the coast of Kanyakumari District under his supervision. Their population has drastically dwindled, owing to population explosion, fishing and construction activities, use of banned purse seine nets and trawlers, and unplanned beach tourism along the coasts of Nagercoil and Kanyakumari District.

He is the author of a few research papers on mushrooms and environmental books.
