= Pillai's arithmetical function =

In number theory, the gcd-sum function, also called Pillai's arithmetical function, is defined for every $n$ by

$$P(n)=\sum_{k=1}^n\gcd(k,n)$$

or equivalently

$$P(n) = \sum_{d\mid n} d \varphi(n/d)$$

where $d$ is a divisor of $n$ and $\varphi$ is Euler's totient function.

it also can be written as

$$P(n) = \sum_{d \mid n} d \tau(d) \mu(n/d)$$

where, $\tau$ is the divisor function, and $\mu$ is the Möbius function.

This multiplicative arithmetical function was introduced by the Indian mathematician Subbayya Sivasankaranarayana Pillai in 1933.
