= H. S. S. Lawrence =

Indian academic (1923–2009)

- Dr. H. S. S. Lawrence
- Born: Harris Sam Sahayam Lawrence; 28 July 1923; Nagercoil, British India
- Died: 21 April 2009 (aged 85); Chennai, India
- Education: M.A.(History and Economics), M.A. (Education), Ed.D
- Alma mater: Scott Christian College
- Occupation: Educationalist
- Known for: Implementing Higher Secondary Education in Tamil Nadu
- Spouse: Maisie Doreen Padma Lawrence
- Children: Two

Harris Sam Sahayam Lawrence (28 July 1923 – 21 April 2009) was an Indian educationalist born in Nagercoil, Tamil Nadu.

As Special Officer for restructuring Educational Pattern in Tamil Nadu and as Director of School Education, Lawrence planned and implemented the All India 10+2+3 pattern of education in 1978. During 1993–1994, Lawrence was Chairman of a High Level Committee on Vocational Education, constituted by the Government of Tamil Nadu, and solved the long-standing problem of salaries for the vocational teachers by raising it and installed a strong management structure for Vocational Education in Tamil Nadu. He was conferred the title of "Father of Vocational Education in Tamil Nadu".

Lawrence wrote his autobiography called The Hand of God My Life and Times, published in 2004.

== Early life ==
Lawrence was the eldest of five children born to Sam and Arulammal Harris. He came from Santhapuram, Kanyakumari, Tamil Nadu, and was named after John Lawrence and Henry Lawrence, two brothers one of whom was the Viceroy.

He was raised as a Christian. When he was nine years old, his mother died unexpectedly. He was educated firstly at the Home Church Elementary School and then at the Scott Christian English High School, both in Nagercoil.

Lawrence was a student of the Intermediate classes of the Scott Christian College, Nagercoil, during 1939–1941. His subjects were English, Tamil, Ancient History, Modern History and Logic. He went to college at the College of Fine Arts Trivandrum and obtained a B.A. Honours in History and Economics.

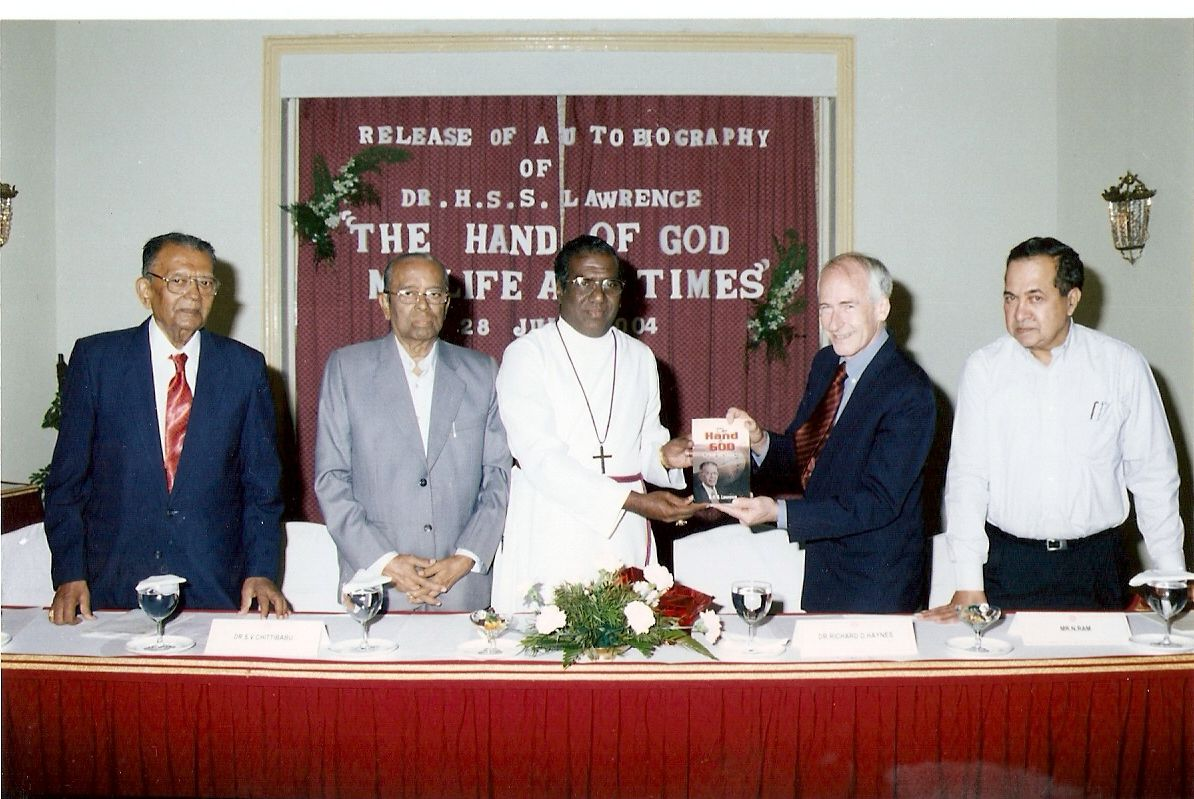
Release of Autobiography held on 28 July 2004. (Standing from left) Dr. H.S.S. Lawrence, Former Vice-Chancellor of Madurai-Kamaraj & Annamalai Universities – Shri S.V. Chitti Babu, CSI Bishop in Madras – Rt. Rev. Dr. V. Devasahayam, United States Consul General for South India – Dr. Richard D. Haynes, Editor-in-chief of The Hindu – Shri Narasimhan Ram.

In search of employment, Lawrence went to Chennai, where he worked for YMCA Marina Canteen and Swimming Pool from September 1944 to September 1947.

He was selected for the Overseas Scholarship Scheme sponsored by the Government of India and obtained a place at Teachers College, Columbia University, New York, which he attended from September 1948. Specialising in teacher education, he stayed until September 1950 and completed MA and Ed.D. (Doctor of Education) degrees.

== Professional experience ==
=== Collegiate ===
- Lecturer, Government Training College, Calicut 1951–53

Introduced practicals for BEd students in education subjects. Lectured on Educational Psychology and Educational Sociology.

- Lecturer, Government Training College, Vellore 1955–56
- Principal, Government Training College, Vellore 1960–63

A Tamil Pandits Training Course was introduced in the College in 1961. The Pandits had general education in Tamil Literature but no knowledge of pedagogy of teaching and learning. Planned and implemented a sound program of student teaching for students in several high schools of Vellore. Dr Rajendra Prasad, President of India, accompanied by Shri K Kamaraj, Chief Minister of Tamil Nadu visited Vellore for inaugurating a school improvement conference. On the way, the car stopped in front of the College and as Principal, Lawrence had the rare privilege of garlanding him. Mrs Lourdammal Simon, Minister for Local Administration, Dr Brand, Christian Medical College & Hospital, Dr Roy Ebenezer, Ophthalmologist, Swamy Kripananda Varier, Swamy Chinmayananda graced the functions of the college.

Receiving Governor of Tamil Nadu, Shri Mohan Lal Sukhadia at his eldest daughter's wedding

- Director State Institute of Education 1965–69

The State Institute of Education, was founded by Dr. Lawrence in 1965 as the "academic wing" of the Education Department for research, innovations, in-service training, extension work, and publications. A quarterly journal in English and monthly in Tamil were also newly introduced. The State Institute of Education later developed into the State Council of Education, Research and Training (SCERT) and now, as the Directorate of Teacher Education, Research and Training (DTERT) with all the teacher training institutes under it. As Founder-Director, Lawrence had laid the proper foundations.

=== Administrative ===
- District Educational Officer, Madurai 1953–54
- District Educational Officer, South Malabar 1954–55
- District Educational Officer, Nilgiris 1956–60
- Divisional Inspector of Schools Madras Division 1963–65

In charge of primary and secondary education as well as training teachers in 3 districts, he supervised the work of the District Educational Officers and Deputy Inspectors of Schools. Undertook tremendous improvements of infrastructure in schools and oversaw the enrollment of students, the increase in the number of Mid-day Meal centres, organizing school improvement conferences and progress of literacy programs. Lawrence also was able to welcome and accompany Valentina Tereshkova of U.S.S.R., a Soviet cosmonaut, the first woman to travel into space at Jawaharlal Nehru Stadium, Chennai.

Teacher's Award Meeting held on 22 October 1977. (Sitting from left) Dr. H.S.S. Lawrence, Chief Minister of Tamil Nadu- Shri M. G. Ramachandran, Governor of Tamil Nadu- Shri Prabhudas Patwari, Minister for School Education – Shri C. Aranganayagam.

Wedding in 1951

=== Head of School education ===
- 'Special Officer for Restructuring Educational Pattern in the State of Tamil Nadu 1976
- 'Director of School Education', Tamil Nadu 1976–78

As Special Officer for restructuring Educational Pattern in Tamil Nadu and as Director of School Education, Dr. Lawrence was involved in the planning and implementation of the All India 10+2+3 pattern of education in 1978. As "Founder Chairman of the Board of Higher Secondary Education", he contributed to the establishment of the higher secondary education system on sound foundations including its expansion to rural areas. Hence Dr. Lawrence is regarded to be the "Architect of Higher Secondary Education in Tamil Nadu".

Lawrence as Director of School Education brought the few Matriculation schools affiliated to Madras and Madurai Universities under a separate Board of Matriculation Schools with him as Chairman. Today the number of Matriculation Schools has grown to over 2200. Lawrence is regarded to be the Founder Chairman Board of Matriculation Schools.

=== UNESCO service Afghanistan ===
- UNESCO Expert on Teacher Education to Government of Afghanistan, Kabul. 1969–1975

Government of Afghanistan and the Director General of UNESCO approved of Dr.Lawrence's candidature for appointment as Expert in Primary Teacher Training at the Academy for Teacher Educators, Charikar, Afghanistan under the UNESCO – UNICEF Joint-Project from 28 May 1969. Lawrence was given a briefing on UN and its Agencies, Economic Development, aims and functions of UNESCO and about Afghanistan at Paris the headquarters of UNESCO. In Afghanistan, he visited Higher Teachers College and Kabul Training College and elementary schools. Firm relationships were established with Asia Foundation, USIS, Indian Embassy and UN Organisations to cooperate jointly in the UNESCO Education Teacher Training Project. A Teacher Training College was set up in Charikar. Contributed to the upgradation of the curriculum of teacher training, organisation of student teaching, conducting post graduate courses, selection of teacher candidates through examinations and teacher educators for post graduate fellowships abroad and introduction of Educational television at the Academy. UNESCO and Government of Afghanistan extended his service every year from 1969 to 1975.

He functioned as Chief Technical Adviser of the UNESCO Training Programme from August to December 1969 and also acted as UNESCO Programme Co-ordinator and Senior Adviser in July 1974.

=== Banking service ===
- President, Regional Recruitment Board for State Bank of India Madras Circle, Chennai 1980–86

State Bank Group, Madras Circle included Tamil Nadu, Karnataka, Kerala and the Union Territory of Puducherry. Lawrence attended the office of the Regional Recruitment Board, conducted Board Meetings, organized written examinations, conducted interviews, published results and allotted candidates to Banks.

- Chairman, Banking Service Recruitment Board (Eastern Group), Calcutta, West Bengal, Sikkim, Andaman, and Nicobar Islands 1986–88

On 20 February 1986, Ministry of Finance (India), New Delhi appointed Lawrence as Chairman, Banking Service Recruitment Board, Calcutta. The Banking Service Recruitment Board (Eastern Group) is responsible for recruitment of staff for banks in West Bengal, Sikkim and Andaman and Nicobar Islands. Examinations, pre-recruitment training, orientation of officers for conduct of examinations, interviews, and final selection were accomplished for twenty-eight public sector banks as well as regional rural banks under Lawrence's Chairmanship. Interviews for selection of candidates for banks were held in Calcutta, Berhampur, Burdwan, Malda, Krishnagar, Midnapur, Siliguri, Gangtok (Sikkim), and Port Blair (Andamans). He lectured in staff colleges of UCO Bank and Allahabad Bank on the conduct of interviews.

- Member, Governing Board (1986–1988), Institute of Banking Personnel Selection (IBPS) Bombay

Lawrence was elected member of Governing Board of IBPS, Bombay. He attended meetings of the Governing Board at the office of the Governor Reserve Bank of India, Mr R. N. Malhotra who was also Chairman of IBPS.

=== Vocational education ===
In 1978, Lawrence introduced vocational education at the +2 stage along with a syllabus for 52 vocational subjects. Vocational student enrolment in Tamil Nadu in 1978 was 24,400 which was 21%, the highest in the country and 1/3 of the total vocational strength in India. During 1993–1994, when he was chairman of a state government committee on vocational education, a new syllabus for 104 vocational courses in the areas of Engineering & technology, Commerce & Business, Agriculture, Home Science and Health was produced.

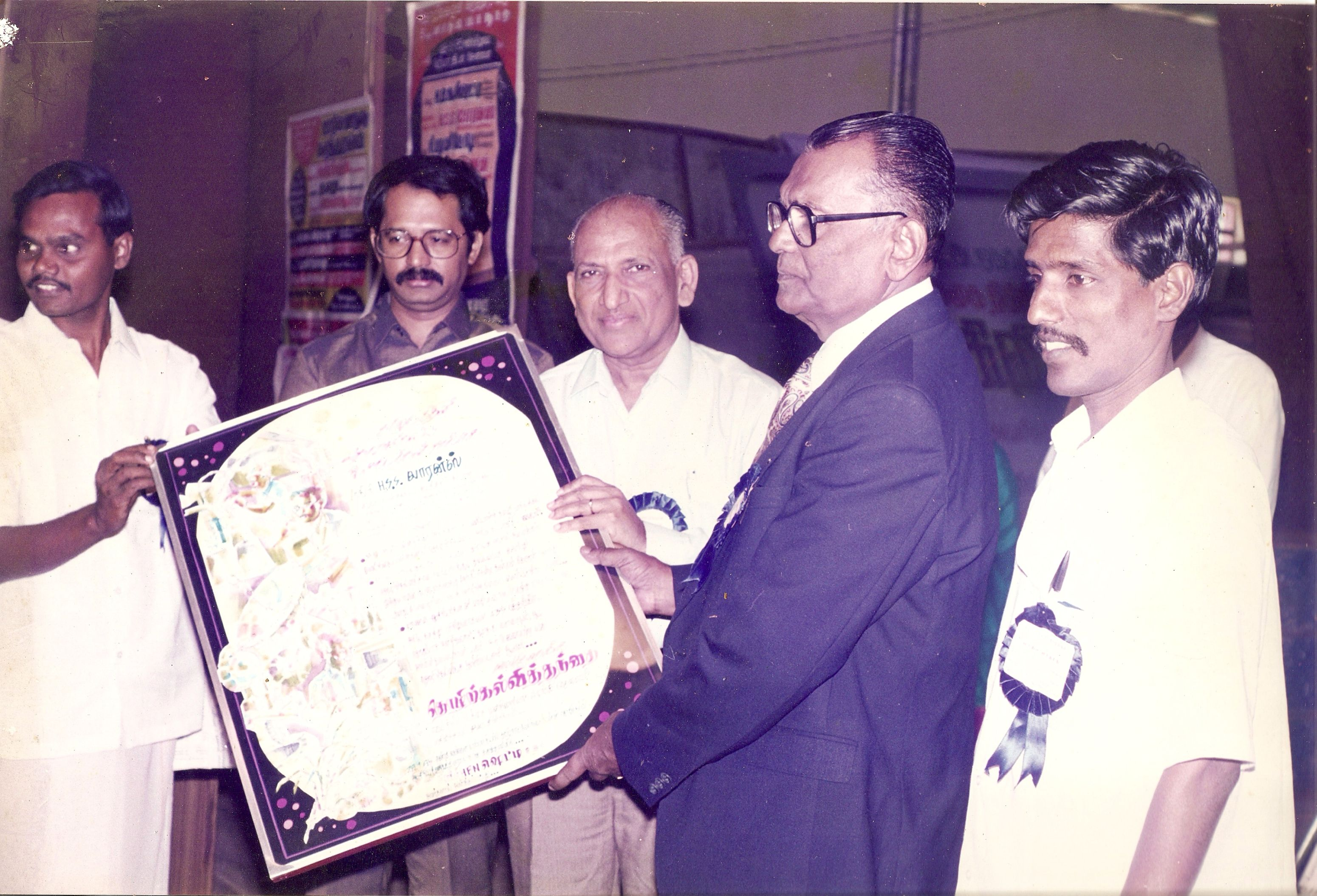
Dr.H.S.S. Lawrence receiving the citation Father of Vocational Education in Tamil Nadu

In 1995, for his contribution to the progress of vocational education, the vocational teachers of Tamil Nadu awarded him the title of "Father of Vocational Education in Tamil Nadu".

At a Public Meeting

== Special contributions ==
=== Panel inspection ===
An innovative scheme of annual panel inspection of Higher Secondary Schools by College Professors, inspecting officers and Heads of Schools was introduced in 1977–78.

=== School complexes ===
School Complexes were organised in over 2072 schools to break down the isolation of schools and to make them function as cooperative groups. A school complex voluntarily links a group of 10–20 primary schools and 3–4 middle schools around a high school as a viable unit for school improvement. The Ministry of Education, Government of India has appreciated the initiative of Tamil Nadu.

=== Voluntary supply of radios to schools ===
Due to a drive given by Dr. Lawrence from 1976, as many as 31,800 schools were supplied with radio sets by the public to listen to School broadcasts. All India Radio appreciated this effort as unique in the whole of India.

=== Survey of unrecognized schools ===
As Chairman of a Committee on Unrecognised Schools, Dr. Lawrence made a survey and submitted his report and recommendations to Government of Tamil Nadu in 1977.

=== Introduction of book banks ===
Schools were requested to start Book Banks on a voluntary basis for the benefit of disadvantaged children. In 1978, over 35,000 schools introduced the scheme to benefit over 1.2 million children.

=== Medals for toppers in public examinations ===
For the first time in 1977, Gold and Silver medals and certificates of merits were distributed to students who obtained the first few ranks in Public Examinations.

=== Good conduct prizes ===
From the academic year 1976–77, Dr. Lawrence requested schools to introduce a scheme of awarding prizes for good conduct to pupils during annual school days. Character, virtues, good manners, good conduct, punctuality, cooperation, devotion to studies, team spirit, regularity and obedience are important aspects in education.

=== Scholarship to children of teachers ===
From 1977–78, scholarships were given for the first time to children of teachers who joined professional courses.

=== Village adoption scheme ===
This was launched in schools on Republic Day 1977 to introduce an integrated approach to rural development with the cooperation of school students. Its main objective was to create and sustain contact among students and villagers for constructive purposes. The adopted villages would gain a new atmosphere while making education meaningful and realistic to students.

=== Operation Clean Up ===
Lawrence requested schools to launch "Operation clean-up" November 1979. The scheme took the practical form of cleaning doors and windows, removing dirt, dust and cobwebs, whitewashing, painting, and simple repairs. The science laboratory, library, storerooms, playground and classrooms were to be cleaned and made presentable. This was work experience, self-help, social training and practical work for students.

=== 150 years of the Education Department (1826–1977) ===
Lawrence, as Director of School Education had the unique privilege of organizing the celebration of 150 years of the Education Department in Tamil Nadu on 24 December 1977.

=== First Prize for School Education Department Float ===
Dr. Lawrence personally supervised the production of a Float at the Republic Day March Past in 1977. The float had a big painting of Bharati and school students danced and sang popular songs of Bharati. The Committee of judges selected this float as the best among all the floats.

== Professional memberships held ==
- Founder Chairman, Board of Higher Secondary Education, Tamil Nadu
- Founder Chairman of Matriculation Board, Tamil Nadu
- Member, Senate and Academic Council of the Universities of Madras, Madurai and Annamalai
- Phi Delta Kappa, a professional fraternity in Education, USA
- Member, Board of Examiners for BEd, MEd and PhD degrees of Madras, Kerala, Annamalai, Venkateswara and Baroda Universities
- Member, Assessment Team of the National Council of Educational Research and Training (NCERT), New Delhi for assessing extension services in Teacher Colleges
- Member, Advisory Committee for Educational Survey and Data Processing, National Council of Educational Research and Training (NCERT), New Delhi
- Member, Advisory Committee of Primary Education Journal, National Council of Educational Research and Training (NCERT), New Delhi
- Member, Advisory Committee on Elementary and Secondary Education of National Council of Educational Research and Training (NCERT), New Delhi
- Member, Advisory Committee for School Curriculum, National Council of Educational Research and Training (NCERT), New Delhi
- Chairman, Board of Teacher Education, Tamil Nadu
- Chairman, Committee on Unrecognized Schools Tamil Nadu
- Member, Board of Studies in Education, Madras University
- Member, Board of Anglo Indian Education, Tamil Nadu
- Member, Board of Technical Education, Tamil Nadu
- Text-Book Review Committee, Chennai
- Member, Board of Governors of Regional Institute of English, Bangalore
- Member, Board of Governors of Technical Teachers Training Institute, Chennai
- Consultant, National Workshop on Curriculum for Development, Kabul
- Member, Advisory Panel, Central Board of Film Certification, Mumbai

== Voluntary service ==
Chairman

- Board of Directors, Madras Christian College, Tambaram Tamil Nadu
- UNESCO Staff Association, Afghanistan
- Compassion International Trust Tamil Nadu
- Vellore Christian Rural Institute
- Junior Red Cross, Tamil Nadu

President, Leprosy Mission, Madras Chapter

Vice – President

- Founder Fellow, Tamil Nadu Academy of Sciences
- Bharat Scouts and Guides, Tamil Nadu

Director, YMCA Chennai

Patron, Home Missionary Society, Chennai

Educational Consultant, AMM Foundation Schools

Member

- Planning Board, Alagappa University
- Meston Education and Development Association (MEDA), Madras
- Board of Governors, St. James' School (India), Calcutta
- UN Staff Association, Executive Board, Afghanistan

Secretary, St. George's Cathedral Chennai

== Death ==
Lawrence died in Chennai on 21 April 2009, at the age of 85.

== Publications ==
Lawrence published over 100 professional papers; his books include:

- In-Service Teacher Education, Ministry of Education, Government of India
- Hand Book of implementation of Higher Secondary Education in Tamil Nadu
- 150 years of Education in Tamil Nadu
- A survey of Unrecognised Schools in Tamil Nadu
- Kalvi Iyal (Tamil)
- Education – Concept and Practice
- Towards Better Vocational Education in Tamil Nadu – High Level Committee Report
- Vocational Education in Higher Secondary Schools (Tamil)
- CSI St. George's Cathedral Chennai – Booklet

== Awards ==
- Distinguished Service Award Southern Literates Association. 1983
- Father of Vocational Education in Tamil Nadu – 28 January 1995
- For the Sake of Honour Award Rotary Club of Madras Mid Town – 19 April 1996
- Outstanding Personality – 1998 Award, Certificate of Merit and Gold Medal from Management Studies Promotion Institute (MSPI), New Delhi 30 October 1998
- Thiruvalluvar Day Prize (Government of Tamil Nadu prize) for the book Kalvi Iyal – 1988 (First Prize)
- Thiruvalluvar Day Prize (Government of Tamil Nadu prize) for the book Vocational Education in Higher Secondary Schools (Tamil) – 2000
- Award of Honour from Kanyakumari Diocese Church of South India, 29 September 2002
