= Madathattuvilai =

Neighbourhood in Kanyakumari district, Tamil Nadu, India

- Village
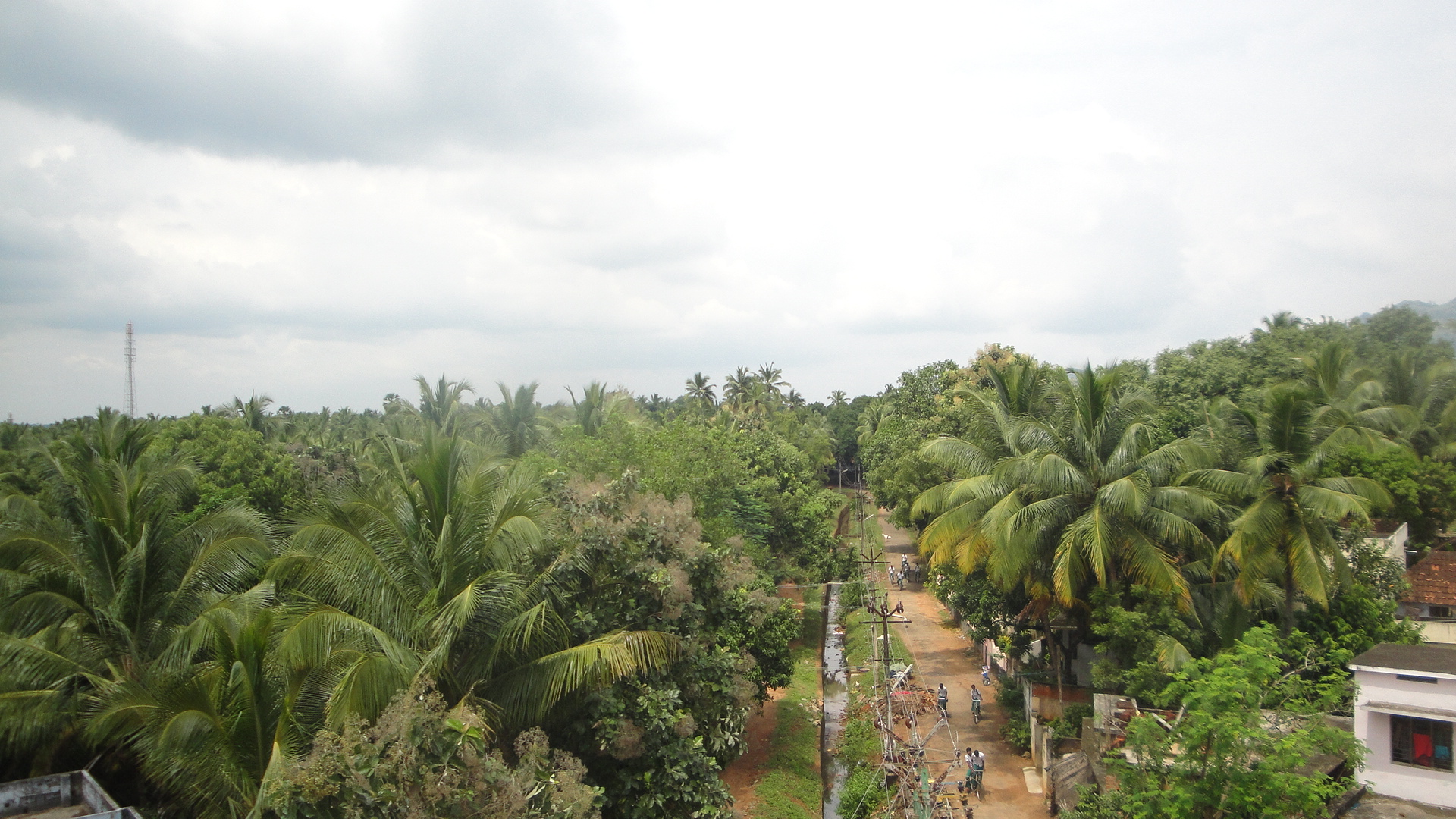
- Madathattuvilai

- Location in Tamil Nadu, India Madathattuvilai (India)
- Coordinates: 8.2196°N 77.3469°E
- Country: India
- State: Tamil Nadu
- District: Kanyakumari district

Population
  - Total: 7,000

Languages
  - Official: Tamil
- Time zone: UTC+5:30 (IST)
- PIN: 629180
- Telephone code: 91-4651
- Vehicle registration: TN-75
- Lok Sabha constituency: Kanyakumari
- Vidhan Sabha constituency: Colachel

Madathattuvilai is a village under Villukuri Panchayat in Kanyakumari district, the southernmost district in the state of Tamil Nadu in India. 400+ residents of Madathattuvilai have donated their eyes in last one decade and making it a trailblazer among cities and towns across the country.

== St. Sebastian Church and Festival ==
St.Sebastian Church situated right in the center of the village, is also an important social center that plays a very important role in the lives of the people in the village. St. Sebastian Church Festival lasts for ten days and draws crowds from surrounding areas for the music, drama and fireworks that add color to this religious event. The festival dates are based on the St. Sebastian Feast (20 January); i.e. 20 January is between the 3rd day to 8th day of the festival.

== Eye Donation ==
As many as 400+ people in the village have donated their eyes over the past 17 years turning Madathattuvilai into a trendsetter in creating awareness on eye donation. About 95% of those who die donate their eyes and 3,000 enrolled for eye donation, most of them were young.

== Education ==
Madathattuvilai peoples are Highly educated. The literacy rate is 100%. At present the village has one teacher or lecturer or college professor in each household. The village produces many Teacher, Lecturer, lawyers, college professors, and government employees, including military and paramilitary service and State Administrative Service personnel. The graduates are multiplied every year. For example Doctorate (both Arts and Science) candidates are approximately 100 in the village.

== Education Institutes ==
- St.Sebastian Matriculation School
- St.Sebastian Matric High School
- St.Aloysius Primary School
- St.Lawrence Higher Secondary School ( which is one of the oldest high schools in the area)
- Mother Gnanamma Catholic College of Education
- St.Sebastian Career Academy
- Adline Matric Higher Secondary School

== Culture and Religion ==
The village, being predominantly Roman Catholic and belong to the Nadar caste..All the people of this village worships St. Sebastian church, Madathattuvilai
