= Nagercoil S. Ganesa Iyer =

Carnatic musician (1905–1978)

- Born: Nagercoil Sthanu Ganesa Iyer; 1905; Nagercoil, Tamil Nadu, British India
- Died: 1978 (aged 72–73)
- Occupations: Mridangam player, vocalist
- Parent(s): Sriman Sthanu Bhagavathar, Narayani

Nagercoil Ganesa Iyer (NSG) (1905–1978) was a prominent Carnatic musician and percussionist.

== Early life ==
Nagercoil S Ganesa Iyer (NSG) was born in Nagercoil in 1905 to Harikatha exponent Srimaan Sthanu Bagavathar, also a Sanskrit professor in Annamalai University and his wife Narayani in travancore music family. Popularly called as NSG in music circle (Reference: Sangeetha priya album).

Having born in sangeetha parambara where his forefathers have contributed to Harikatha, vocal and harmonium, he learnt music from his father Sthanu Bagavathar and elder brother Padmanabha Iyer. During one such katha kalakshepam, Travancore Raja recognized this toddler' talent after seeing him playing with rhythm and Talas and encouraged him to get trained in mridangam. He was trained by many vidwans of the golden era and acquired the treasure of playing for various compositions. He along with his brother Nagercoil harihara iyer and his father Sthanu Iyer promoted the Tamil krithis of legend Lakshmana Pillai (Reference: Shanmuga magazine). He has trained many students in vocal and mridangam including his sons, nephew Suchindrum krishnan, salvadi etc. and encouraged many young artists of that era to mark their feet who have their musical lineages now.

=== Concerts accompaniment and his performance ===
NSG started his musical journey at a very tender age by playing in many carnatic concerts during temple festivals, and marriage functions in and around Nagercoil. He was a leading accompanist to major stalwarts like Chowdaiah, Mudikondan Venkatarama Iyer, Chembai Vaidyanatha Bagavathar, Tiger Varadachari. Chennai Music Academy archive provides glimpse of his fingers that played magic with all the gems in the carnatic field. He has performed in many concerts for complicated swaras with reverberating rhythms to the then leading vocalists Sri Semmangudi Srinivasa Iyer, GNB, Musiri subramania iyer, Ariyakudi Ramanuja Iyengar, Nagercoil Harihara Iyer, Mudikondan Venkatramier, Dwaram Venkataswamy Naidu, Maharajapuram Santhanam, Manakal Rangarajan and Maharajapuram Vishwanatha Iyer. He has played with leading accompanist Chowdaiah, Kumbakonam Sitharama Aiyar, Tiruvalangadu Sundaresier, T.K. Jayarama Iyer, Sri Lalgudi Jeyaraman, RK Venkatarama sastry, M.N Chandrasekhar, Veena Balachander, V. Thyagarajan and Thiruvizhimazhalai Swaminatha Pillay. Posters and invitations of Chennai Music Academy and gramophone recordings talks volumes of this.

He has got laurels playing to Royal family of Travancore at Navarathri golu mandapam festivals. His other regular concerts were Thiruvisanallur Ayyawal Utsavam, Lagudi Thiruvadhirai festival, Nungambakkam agastheeswarar festival and December Margazhi festival. He has performed in many sabhas like Mylai SaiGana Sabha, Sri Thyagabrahma bakthajana sabha, Saraswati Gana sabha, Perambur Sangeetha Sabha (PSS), RR Sabha, Tamizh isai mandram etc. He was senior artist in All India Radio Chennai (AIR) and have performed in Doordarshan as well.

In Kalaiarangam section in Dinamani news writer Sri KM Rangaswamy has claimed Nagercoil Ganesa Iyers's performance at Sri Thayagabrahma baktha jana sabha as perfect amazing performance in terms of clarity and speed at which it was played. Melody flown from both sides of Mirudangam, audience could not hear even a single harsh beating in the entire concert. It looked like his Mirudangam is singing along with the performer Nagercoil Harihara Iyer.

Padmushan Dr. Pinaka Pani in his interview to Sruti magazine in August 2010 has said that he stressed his friend Venkatarangam Iyengar to arrange Sri Lalgudi Jeyaraman and Sri Nagercoil Ganesa Iyer for concerts at Kurnool and Adoni.

Even during his old age, he breathed music and did lot of charity work by performing in marriages and temple festivals popularly known as Thengai Mudi kutcheries those days.
