= Subbayya Sivasankaranarayana Pillai =

Indian mathematician (1901–1950)

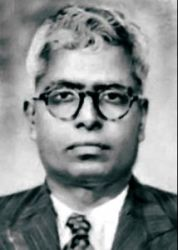
- Born: 5 April 1901; Vallam, British India (now in Tamil Nadu, India)
- Died: 31 August 1950 (aged 49); Cairo, Egypt
- Education: Scott Christian College, Nagercoil
- Known for: Pillai's conjecture; Pillai's arithmetical function; Pillai prime; Pillai sequence
- Scientific career
- Fields: Mathematics

Subbayya Sivasankaranarayana Pillai (5 April 1901 – 31 August 1950) was an Indian mathematician specialising in number theory. His contribution to Waring's problem was described in 1950 by K. S. Chandrasekharan as "almost certainly his best piece of work and one of the very best achievements in Indian Mathematics since Ramanujan".

== Biography ==
Subbayya Sivasankaranarayana Pillai was born to parents Subbayya Pillai and Gomati Ammal. His mother died a year after his birth and his father when Pillai was in his last year at school.

Pillai did his intermediate course and B.Sc. Mathematics in the Scott Christian College at Nagercoil and managed to earn a B.A. degree from Maharaja's college, Trivandrum.

In 1927, Pillai was awarded a research fellowship at the University of Madras to work among professors K. Ananda Rau and Ramaswamy S. Vaidyanathaswamy. He was from 1929 to 1941 at Annamalai University where he worked as a lecturer. It was in Annamalai University that he did his major work in Waring's problem. In 1941, he went to the University of Travancore and a year later to the University of Calcutta as a lecturer (where he was at the invitation of Friedrich Wilhelm Levi).

For his achievements he was invited in August 1950, for a year to visit the Institute for Advanced Study, Princeton, United States. He was also invited to participate in the International Congress of Mathematicians at Harvard University as a delegate of the Madras University but he died during the crash of TWA Flight 903 in Egypt on the way to the conference.

== Contributions ==
He proved the Waring's problem for $k\ge 6$ in 1935 under the further condition of $(3^k + 1)/(2^k - 1)\le [1.5^k] + 1$ ahead of Leonard Eugene Dickson who around the same time proved it for $k\ge 7.$

He showed that $g(k) = 2^k + l - 2$ where $l$ is the largest natural number $\le (3/2)^k$ and hence computed the precise value of $g(6) = 73$.

The Pillai sequence 1, 4, 27, 1354, ..., is a quickly growing integer sequence in which each term is the sum of the previous term and a prime number whose following prime gap is larger than the previous term. It was studied by Pillai in connection with representing numbers as sums of prime numbers.
