= M. J. Rabi Singh =

Dr. Prof. M J Rabi Singh
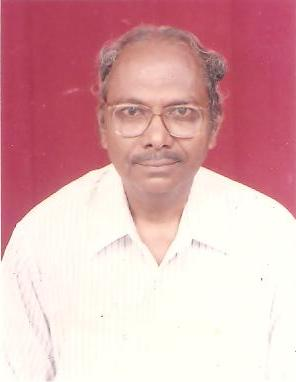
- Born: 22 June 1939 (age 87); Nagercoil, Tamil Nadu, India
- Education: University of Madras
- Known for: Tamil Classical Literature, Research in comparative Literature
- Scientific career
- Fields: Comparative Literature
- Workplaces: University of Madras

Prof. M. J. Rabi Singh is a scholar in Tamil and comparative literature. Born in 1939 in Nagercoil in Tamil Nadu, India, he currently resides in Chennai, India.

== Career ==
He initially started his academic career as a tutor in Voorhees college, Vellore. He then served as assistant professor at Government Arts College and then at Presidency college, Chennai. He went on to become a professor in Tamil. As a professor and head of department of Tamil, he has worked at Sri Pushpam College in Poondi, M.R. Government Arts college in Mannargudi and at Benares Hindu University at Varnasi. After retirement he served as visiting Professor, guest faculty at the University of Madras.

Between 2000 and 2007, he worked as a Senior consultant at the newly created Tamil Virtual University. In this position, he was hugely responsible for the start up and creation of online content for Tamil. He brought in lesson writers besides himself from far and wide to ensure the quality of the academic content available for the online courses offered by the university.

He has also filled in as Director in charge for short period and ensured successful running of the university. He has also served as project director for Indian Council for Social Sciences Research [ICSSR].

== Research ==
His primary research interests lie in Comparative Literature, Literature and Reflections of Society, Classical Heroic Poetry, the Narrative Method in Historical Enquiry and Computer-Assisted Education.

== Publications ==
He has published 13 books, including two books edited. One of them, Sengol Vènthar, was prescribed as a textbook for undergraduate courses in the Universities of Madras, Madurai-Kāmarāj, Annāmalai and Mysore. He has also published 32 research articles in English and Tamil.

== Education ==
He did his B.Sc. in mathematics at the university of Madras(1961). His love for Tamil made him switch to doing a M.A. in Tamil language and literature. He followed this up with a diploma in higher education and an M.Phil. in stylistics study. He completed his Ph.D. in comparative literature at the University of Madras in 1980. His doctoral thesis was a comparative study on social novels in Tamil and Malayalam.
