= M. S. S. Pandian =

Social scientist who studied South Indian politics and culture

- Born: Mathias Samuel Soundra Pandian; 16 December 1958; Marthandam, Kanniyakumari District, Madras State (now Tamil Nadu), India
- Died: 10 November 2014 (aged 55); New Delhi, NCT of Delhi, India
- Education: Madras University, Scott Christian College
- Occupations: Social Scientist, Academician
- Writing career
- Notable works: The Image Trap(1992) Brahmin and Non-Brahmin: Genealogies of the Tamil Political Present(2007/2008)

Mathias Samuel Soundra Pandian (16 December 1958 – 10 November 2014) was an eminent social scientist whose area of research covered the Dravidian Movement, South Indian politics, cinema, caste, identity and several other socially relevant issues. Pandian joined the Jawaharlal Nehru University (JNU), Delhi as a professor in 2009. While serving in the School of Social Sciences' Centre for Historical Studies he offered courses on 'Region, Language and the Politics of Nation Making' and 'Caste, Culture and Communication: An Alternative Intellectual History of Modern India'.

== Education and academic career ==
Pandian was a native of Marthandam, a town in Kanyakumari district. Pandian completed his B.A. in economics from Scott Christian College, Nagercoil in 1978. He then shifted to Chennai to pursue postgraduate studies in Economics at The Madras Christian College (MCC). He completed the degree in 1980. He finished his Ph.D. from Madras University in 1987. He worked at the Madras Institute of Development Studies (MIDS), Madras as an associate professor from 1989 to 2001. He taught briefly as an Adjunct Faculty at the Asian College of Journalism (ACJ) in Chennai. He was the Honorary Visiting Fellow, Sarai Programme at the Centre for the Study of Developing Societies (CSDS), Delhi during the period of 2002–2009. Pandian joined the Jawaharlal Nehru University, Delhi in 2009 and continued in the post until his death in 2014. He was a member of the Subaltern Studies editorial collective for a number of years, jointly editing volume 12 (published in 2005).

Pandian was the Rama Wattamul Distinguished Indian Scholar at the University of Hawaii, Honolulu in 2008. Other posts he held include: visiting fellow, Centre of South Asian Studies at the Cambridge University in 2004 and visiting professor in human sciences at the George Washington University in Washington, D.C., in 2002.

== Death and legacy ==
Pandian died on 10 November 2014, in Delhi following a cardiac arrest. His scholarly contribution was celebrated in a 2019 festschrift titled Rethinking social justice published by Orient Blackswan and edited by S. Anandhi, Karthick Ram Manoharan, M. Vijayabaskar and A. Kalaiyarasan.

== Selected publications ==
- Political Economy of Agrarian Change: Nanchilnadu, 1880-1939, Sage, 1990.
- The Image Trap, Sage, 1992.
- 'Beyond Colonial Crumbs: Cambridge school, identity politics and Dravidian movement(s)', Economic and Political Weekly, 30(7-8), 385-391. 1995.
- 'Dalit assertion in Tamil Nadu: an exploratory note', Journal of Indian School of Political Economy, 12(3-4), 501-17. 2000.
- Muslims, Dalits and Fabrications of History: Subaltern Studies: Writings on South Asian History and Society, Vol. 12, 2005. Co-edited with Shail Mayaram, and Ajay Skaria.
- Brahmin and Non-Brahmin: Genealogies of the Tamil Political Present, Permanent Black, 2007.
