= Nagercoil Harihara Iyer =

Sangeetha Surendra Nagercoil S Harihara Iyer (NSH) (1916-1994) was an Indian Carnatic singer and violinist.

== Early life ==
Harihara Iyer was born in Nagercoil to Katha Kalakshepam Carnatic music evangelist Srimaan Sthanu Bhagavathar (also referred to as Sthanu Shastrigal) and his wife Narayani. His elder brother Mridangam Vidwan Nagercoil S. Ganesa Iyer was also a musician. Sthanu Sastrigal was then a Sanskrit professor from Annamalai University. Harihara Iyer had played numerous concerts in dual capacity as a vocalist and as a violinist along with Ganesa.

He was conferred the title Sangeetha Surendra by Puri Sankaracharya in 1948 and was honoured by Saraswathi Gana Sabha. He made his debut in 1933 at Trivandrum on harmonium.

Iyer learned harmonium from his elder brother Nagercoil Padmanabha Iyer and violin from Kodaganallur Subbiah Bhagavatar and TK Jayarama Iyer . He along with Ganesa and his father sang krithis of Swathi Tirunal and promoted Tamil krithis by Lakshmana Pillai. Over the years, he trained many students including his nephew violinist Sthanunathan who had accompanied him in various concerts. His son Viswanathan and his grandson Harish perform in concerts internationally. Gen Z. Seetha Narayanan is his disciple in vocalist tree. He was a teacher at Kalakshetra in both vocal and violin. Maharajapuram Viswanatha Iyer had called him a "pre-eminent violinist and vocalist well versed in practice".

== Performances ==
Harihara Iyer performed around the world as an accompanist and lead performer. Reviews in dailies described him as a next generation Sri Ariyakudi. Sabha in 1930s-1960s spoke tons on his accomplishments and performances. He toured Malaysia, Ceylon and Rangoon. He started his performances in All India Radio in 1943. He also performed in various temples like Lalgudi, Madurai Azhagar temple.

=== Accompanist for ===
- D.K.Pattamal
- Semmangudi Srinivasa Iyer
- Maharajapuram Viswanatha Iyer
- Chembai
- Ariyakudi
- GNB.

=== Accompanists ===
- M.N Chandrasekhar
- Tiruvalankadu Sundaresa iyer
- Sastry
- Lalgudi Jayaraman
- T.N.Krishnan
- Kumbakonam Srinivasa Iyer
- Parur Anantha Raman
- Kumbakonam Krishnaswamy .

=== Alapanas ===
- Darbar
- Kalyani
- Kambhoji
- Abhogi, Ananda Bairavi
- Todi Ragaams

=== Sabhas ===
- Madras Music Academy
- Mylai Sai
- Gana Sabha
- Sri Thyagabrahma Bhakthajana sabha
- Saraswati Gana Sabha
- Indian Fine Arts
- Perambur Sangeetha Sabha (PSS)
- RR Sabha (Mylapore)
- Tamizh isai mandram
- Karnataka sangeetha Sabha (Simla)
- Kala kendrum (Nagpur)

== Death ==
He died in 1994.
