= J Daniel Chellappa =

Indian technical coordinator

- Occupation: Retired Technical coordinator

Mr. J. Daniel Chellappa is a retired technical coordinator with the Department of Atomic Energy and the Indira Gandhi Centre for Atomic Research, Chennai.

He has a Master of Science in chemistry from Loyola College, Chennai. He has no research publications or patents.

He was honoured with the ‘(Chanakya) Award for the Outstanding Public Communication Professionals'.
