= J. C. Daniel (naturalist) =

Naturalist

Jivanayakam Cyril Daniel
- Born: 9 July 1927; Nagercoil, Tamil Nadu, India
- Died: 23 August 2011 (aged 84); Mumbai, India
- Known for: The Book of Indian Reptiles and A Century of Natural History and Conservation in Developing Countries
- Scientific career
- Institutions: Bombay Natural History Society

Jivanayakam Cyril Daniel (9 July 1927 – 23 August 2011), or J. C., as he was known, was an Indian naturalist from Nagercoil, and the author of several acclaimed books on birds, mammals, and reptiles.

== Life and work ==
Influenced early in his life by Sálim Ali, he had a long association with the Bombay Natural History Society, where he served as a curator from 1950, and was then its first director. After retirement in 1991, he was elected an Honorary Member and was also its Honorary Secretary.

His books include The Book of Indian Reptiles and A Century of Natural History and Conservation in Developing Countries. He co-authored Indian Wildlife – Insight Guides Lion Section. He revised Ali's Book of Indian Birds for its 12th edition, published in 1996.

He was also executive editor of the society's journal and the initiator of the Hornbill magazine.

He was diagnosed with cancer and died in Mumbai on 23 August 2011.

== Legacy ==
J. C. Daniel is commemorated in the scientific name of species of lizard, Bronchocela danieli.
