= Christopher Nelson (police officer) =

Indian police officer

- Born: Nagercoil
- Occupation: Former IPS Officer

Christopher Nelson is a retired Indian Police Service Officer and comes from Nagercoil in the Indian state of Tamil Nadu.

A postgraduate who studied economics, Nelson retired from policing in 2011 and was appointed as a full-time member of the Tamil Nadu Planning Commission. He had held the rank of Inspector-general in the police.

He has denied allegations that he was present at the controversial arrest of M. K. Karunanidhi, the then chief minister of Tamil Nadu, in 2001.

== Achievements ==
He was awarded the President's Police Medal in 1995. In September 2012 he was appointed an Information Commissioner for Tamil Nadu by the state's government.
