= Scott Christian College =

College in Tamil Nadu, India

- ஸ்காட் கிறிஸ்டியன் கல்லூரி
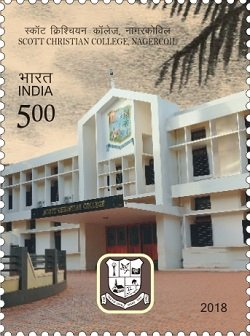
- Commemorative stamp of the college in 2018
- Motto: Etveritas Liberabit Vos (Latin)
- Motto in English: The Truth Shall Make You Free
- Established: 1893; 133 years ago
- Founders: Rev. Dr. James Duthie
- Accreditation: UGC, NAAC
- Academic affiliations: Manonmaniam Sundaranar University
- Chairman: A. R. Chelliah
- Principal: J. R. V. Edward
- Students: 2926
- Location: Nagercoil, Tamil Nadu, India; 8.17°N 77.43°E
- Campus: Urban
- Colours: Cardinal red
- Mascot: Dove
- Website: scott.ac.in

Scott Christian College is an autonomous, co-educational, arts and science college in Nagercoil, Tamil Nadu. Run by the Diocese of Kanyakumari of the Church of South India, the college is graded "A" under National Assessment and Accreditation Council (NAAC) rankings in India and is rated 5-star.

The college is one of the oldest colleges in the present-day Tamilnadu state and one of the first to be started in the erstwhile princely state of Travancore. The alumni of the college are called Scottians.

== History ==
The college had its origins in a village-church school founded in 1809 at Mylaudy by the Revd William Tobias Ringeltaube, the pioneering missionary of the London Missionary Society in South Travancore. This Central School or Seminary was shifted to Nagercoil in 1818 by the Revd Charles Mead. The Revd Dr James Duthie took charge of the Seminary in 1860, and played a vital role in raising it to a college.

In 1893 the Seminary was elevated to a Second Grade College affiliated to the University of Madras with twelve students under the Revd Dr James Duthie as the first principal. He was succeeded by Mr. J.E. Dennison who was the Principal of the college from 1894 to 1898. After Mr Dennison severed his connection with the South Travancore Mission in 1898 the Revd Duthie nourished the young institution till the arrival of the Revd George Parker who assumed charge in January 1901.

The college recorded rapid progress under the Revd Parker's care. The Indian Universities' Act of 1904 introduced the Intermediate Examination course in the place of First in Arts (F.A) Examination course. The Revd Parker built the Science Block for the college in 1908–1910 with a legacy of £1000 from the family of Mr. Septimus Scott and a grant from the government of Travancore. With money donated by the Revd Parker's father-in-law, Mr. E. D. Pochin of Manchester an extensive plot of ground was purchased for the recreation of students.

During the Revd Parker's furlough, the Revd Dr Sydney Cave was in charge of the college from 1909 to 1911. The Revd Parker returned in February 1911 and resumed charge. The Revd R. H. Eastaff who was appointed to assist the Revd Parker arrived on 3 February 1921 and took over as Principal in June, 1921 when the Revd Parker left on furlough. To the Revd Eastaff goes the honour of having started The Scott Christian College and School Magazine which was published every term during his period of service in the college. On the return of the Revd Parker in November 1923 the Revd Eastaff left the college and took charge of the Divinity School in Trivandrum.

The Library was equipped with up-to-date volumes which ran up to 4000 in 1924. During the year 1924–25 in addition to the Literary Associations in English, Tamil and Malayalam, a Science Association was formed and students themselves presided over meetings. In 1925 H.E. Viscount Goshen, Governor of Madras visited the college. The Silver Jubilee of Mr. Parker's service was celebrated on 12 February 1926.

On 1 February 1927, Mr. G.H. Marsden, M.A. Tripos of the University of Cambridge took charge as Principal. He took special care in increasing the facilities for the Science Department. By selfless and untiring work he built up the small Intermediate College of about 140 students. Women students in regular batches were admitted from 1927 onwards and he introduced an annual medical inspection of students in 1928.

Compulsory games were introduced for the men students in 1927. Scott Christian became the first Mofussil College in the Madras University to have Compulsory Physical Education for men students under a qualified Physical Director with the status of a Lecturer. There was provision for Badminton and Tennikoit for the women students. Lord Irwin the Viceroy with Lady Irwin paid a visit to the college on 9 December 1929. In 1934 Intramural games were organised and so enthusiastically did the students participate in these events that from among them blossomed forth outstanding sportspersons. In 1936, Mr. Marsden's great interest in Astronomy brought him the rare distinction of being chosen to observe the Solar Eclipse in Japan.

When the University of Travancore was established in 1938 the Scott Christian College was admitted to its privileges. By 1943 the number of students in the college had increased to nearly 300 including about 20 women. Since 1948 a period of expansion commenced. The Travancore University sent a Commission which suggested the strength of the Intermediate Classes to be doubled as a prelude to the introduction of degree classes. Mr. A. Nesamony, who had played a distinguished role in Church and public life, took up the responsibility of building the new Degree College block. His persistence, patience and hard work yielded spectacular results. The year 1950 saw the introduction of Degree courses at Scott Christian. The first majors introduced were Mathematics and History, and this was followed by Chemistry (1952), Economics (1954), Physics (1954) and Zoology (1956).

Mr. B. Arumai Raj succeeded Mr. Marsden in 1957. The Linguistic Reorganisation of States caused this area to be merged with Madras State and the college had to be affiliated to the University of Madras in 1957. A General Inspection Commission led by Dr. A. Lakshmanaswamy Mudaliar, Vice-Chancellor of Madras University visited the college and recommended moving the college to a more spacious campus. Soon 43 acres of land was purchased for the New Campus on the National Highway 47. B.Sc. Botany Major was introduced in June 1966. The college was affiliated to the Madurai University in the same year. Mr. Arumai Raj retired in 1966 and Dr. John D.K. Sundersingh took over as Principal. In 1967 the Scott Christian College celebrated its 75th anniversary as the Platinum Jubilee. The Degree Classes were shifted to the New Campus during 1970–1971.

The college progressively introduced new courses for the undergraduates: B.A. English (1971), B.Com. (1978), B.A. Tamil (1979) and self-financed B.Sc. Computer Science (1997), B.Sc. Physical Education (2002), B.Com. (2002), BBA (2003), BBM (2007) and BCA (2007). The commencing of post-graduate courses in 1971 was a significant landmark in the history of this college and now there are eleven postgraduate courses in arts, science and commerce subjects.

The courses offered at the postgraduate level include M.A. English Literature (1971), M.A. Economics (1971), M.Sc. Zoology (1980), M.Com. (1981), M.Sc. Chemistry (1982), M.Sc. Botany (1983), M.Sc. Physics (1987), M.Sc. Mathematics (1988) and self-financed M.A. History (1992), M.A. Tamil (1994), M.Sc. Computer Science (2003), PGDCA (2006), M.Sc. Micro-biology (2007) and PGDBM (2007).

Pre-doctoral courses were introduced in 1984. The following M.Phil. courses are offered by the college. They include zoology (1984), botany (1986), economics (1986), commerce (1991), Tamil (1996), physics (1996), English (2001), chemistry (2006), history (2006) and mathematics (2006). In 1990 the Madurai University recognized Scott Christian as a Research Centre for Economics and sanction was given for Ph.D. in economics from June 1990. In addition to the following Centres that offer facilities for doctoral research - zoology (1996), Tamil (1998), botany (1999), commerce (2000), English (2003), chemistry (2004), history (2008) and physics (2010). Intercom facilities were introduced in 1972 followed by fax and internet in 1999. A web page was added in 2001.

The Status of Autonomy was conferred on Scott Christian College, in April 2005, perhaps the most historic moment in the annals of this pioneering seat of higher learning in the South. The NAAC Peer team visit in campus in April 2009 and College was awarded 'A' the highest grade. The Ida Marsden Hostel was extended accommodation 500 students in 2009. The UGC has constituted an Expert Committee to evaluate the performance and academic attainments for the Extension of Autonomous Status. The process is expect to be completed within couple of months.

The Status of Autonomy was conferred on Scott Christian College, in April 2005.

== Rankings ==
College rankings

General – India
- NIRF (Colleges) (2022): 96

The college is ranked 100th among colleges in India by the National Institutional Ranking Framework (NIRF) in 2024.
