= Outline of Ayyavazhi =

Indian belief system and Vaishnava Hindu sect

The following outline is provided as an overview and topic guide to Ayyavazhi:

Ayyavazhi (Tamil: அய்யாவழி, Malayalam: അയ്യാവഴി Ayyāvaḻi [əjːaːvəɻi], lit. 'Path of the Master') is a Hindu denomination that originated in South India during the 19th century.

Ayyavazhi is centered on the life and preachings of Ayya Vaikundar; its ideas and philosophy are based on the holy texts Akilathirattu Ammanai and Arul Nool. Accordingly, Ayya Vaikundar was the Purna avatar of Narayana. Ayyavazhi shares many ideas with Hinduism in its beliefs and practice, but differs considerably in its concepts of good and evil and dharma. Ayyavazhi is classified as a dharmic belief because of its central focus on dharma.

== Theology ==
- Ayya Vaikundar
- Tavam of Vaikundar
- Katuvai Sothanai
- Vinchai to Vaikundar
- Ekam
- Ayyavazhi theology
- Ayyavazhi Trinity

== Mythology ==
- Detchanam
- Detchana Puthumai
- Ayyavazhi mythology
- Chathura Yukam
- Netu Yukam
- Kretha Yukam
- Dharma Yukam
- The Naming ceremony of Santror
- Ayotha Amirtha Gangai
- Fostered by the acclaimed Deity Patrakali
- Kalimayai
- Thirukkalyana Ekanai
- Boons offered to Kaliyan
- Pushpa Vimana
- Tava lokam
- Neetiya Yuga
- Deiva Loga
- Yama Loga
- Thirumal in Thiruvananthapuram
- Swarga Loga
- Brahma Loga
- Vaikunda Loga
- Siva Loga
- Para Loga
- Vitthakalai
- Parvatha Ucchi Malai

=== Mythical figures ===
- Sampooranathevan
- Kroni
- Three God heads
- Chanars
- The Santror
- Kalineesan
- Ravana
- Kaliyan
- Kalicchi
- Punal Rhishi
- Venneesan
- Narayana
- Natalvar

== Religious studies ==
- Ayyavazhi beliefs
- Thuvayal Thavasu
- List of Ayyavazhi organisations
- Worship centers of Ayyavazhi
- Thuvayal Thavam
- Ayya Vaikunda Avataram
- Ayyavazhi religious practices
- Ayyavazhi publications
- Ayyavazhi religious studies
- Anna Dharmam
- Ayyavazhi in reports by Christian missionaries
- Thirunamam
- Main teachings of Ayya Vaikundar
- Vaikunda Avatara Orvalam
- Kodiyettru Thirunal
- Ayyavazhi symbolism
- Panguni Theertham
- Timeline of Ayyavazhi history
- Inclusiveness and exclusivity in Ayyavazhi
- Ayyavazhi Dharma
- Ayyavazhi ethics
- Ayyavazhi phenomenology
- Ayyavazhi festivals

== Scriptures ==
=== Akilattirattu Ammanai ===
- Thiru Edu-Vasippu
- Thiruvasakam (Ayyavazhi)
- Adiyeduttharulal
- Akilam one
- Akilam two
- Akilam three
- Akilam four
- Akilam five
- Thiru Nadana Ula
- Thiru Eadu Vasippu
- Akilam fifteen
- Akilam seventeen
- Akilam sixteen
- Akilam six
- Akilam seven
- Akilam eight
- Akilam nine
- Akilam ten
- Akilam eleven
- Akilam twelve
- Akilam thirteen
- Akilam fourteen
- Palaramachandran version
- Sentratisai Ventraperumal version
- Vaikundar Thirukkudumbam version
- Vivekanandan version

=== Arul Nool ===
- Nadutheervai Ula
- Saattu Neettolai
- Panchadevar Urppatthi
- Patthiram
- Sivakanta Athikarappatthiram
- Thingal patham
- Saptha Kannimar Padal
- Pothippu
- Kalyana Vazhthu

== People ==
- Seedars
- Payyan dynasty
- Bala Prajapathi Adikalar

== Places ==
- Swamithope
- Nizhal Thangal
- Pathi
- Pancha pathi
- Ambalappathi
- Muttappathi
- Tamaraikulampathi
- Pooppathi
- Vakaippathi
- Thiruchendur
- Avatharappathi
- Ayyavazhi holy sites
- Thamaraiyur
- Thuvaraiyam Pathi
- Tamaraikulam
- Poovantanthoppe
- Singarathoppe
- Swamithope pathi
- Chettikudiyiruppu
- Agastheeswaram
- Paloor
- Sundavilai
- Vadalivilai
- Kadambankulam
- Pambankulam
- Marunthuvazh Malai
- Vaikunda Malai
- Nizhal Thangal of Nelli-ninra Vilai
- Nizhal Thangal of Attoor
- Nizhal Thangal of Nadusalaiputhur
- Vaikunda Chella Pathi
- Thulangum pathi thuvaraium pathi

== Philosophy ==
- Kosas
- Tatvas
- Neetham

== Others ==
- Anbukkodimakkal Thirucchabai
- Ayyavazhi marriage
- Elunetru
- Muthirikkinaru
- Shamanism in Ayyavazhi
- Vatakku Vasal

== See also ==
- List of Hinduism-related topics
