= Akilam six =

Akilam six is the sixth section of Akilam, the primary holy scripture of Ayyavazhi. This section describes the transformation of the ruling authority of the universe from Sivan to Thirumal.

It also narrates the preparational events of the Avatar of Vaikundar. There is a description of the famine and other natural disasters that took place in the Travancore country because Thirumal left from there.

== The plea of Devas ==
Since Thirumal left Travancore because of the cruel rule of the king, the country faced a lot of political, economic as well as natural disasters. But the land of Tiruchendur where Thirumal arrived after quitting Thiruvananthapuram, changed as a land of prosperity. Apart from human beings, other living beings too identified Thirumal, and acted as per his commands. But in Thiruvananthapuram, the country went worse and the king had no grace towards the Santror and ruled over them cruelly. Heavy taxes were charged on them. Many basic human rights were rejected for them and considered untouchables. Devas were not able to tolerate the pathetic situation of the Santror. So they pleaded towards Thirumal for the rescue of Santror.

== Thirumal accepting to visit Kayilai ==
Meanwhile, Sakthi, the consort of Sivan visited Tiruchendur and requested Thirumal to come to Kayilai. Thirumal replied saying that, "Even after knowing the serious nature of Kroni's final fragment, your husband, believing the words of Devas and others, created him without discussing me. So I won't come there and you may go." But Sakthi replied, "Since the advent of Kaliyan even the Kayilai was enclosed by the evil of Kali. The Neetham there may be completely destroyed. The whole world might get destroyed and all the devas will lose their divine nature. So please come there."

After hearing this humble request of Sakthi, Thirumal decided to visit Kayilai. But he sensed that the Kayilai itself was already affected by the evil Kayilai. So if he goes there as he is, he too will get affected to the evil. So he enveloped his body with Venneer, locked his hair entangled and worn the 32 Dharmas as Safron cloth and went to Kayilai.

== The transformation of authority ==
As soon as Thirumal entered Kayilai, the darkness spread over there due to the disappearance of the evil Kali. Sivan welcomed Thirumal and told about his sufferings to Thirumal. Hearing that Thirumal summarised all the whole events happened till then right from the creation. And finally told that during all the previous activities we all used to discuss before performing anything. But you yourself created the Kali Yuga and the Kaliyan without a word from me. So you manage yourself and do whatever you wish yourself as done so far.

Sivan replied that, "When Kroni was created in the Neediya Yukam, he due to hunger, tried to swallow Kayilai and also us. Then you asked me to offer you the boon to kill him. I told then that, if Kroni was to be destroyed, there is only one way, by fragmenting him into six. If so the six fragments each in the successive six yugas will take birth in the world as enemy of yourself. You may have to incarnate in the world and have to destroy him. As per that deed it's your duty to destroy him. So please understand the situation." Saying this Sivan also surrendered all his powers of authority to Thirumal to control and rule the whole world. So Thirumal accepted to find solution for the destruction of Kali Yuga and Kaliyan.

== Devas to take birth in Bhoo Loga ==
He accepted to take birth and before that he asked Sivan to assemble all Devas who told to Sivan earlier that Thirumal was in a divine sleep in the Boo Loga. As per the command Sivan assembled all of them there. Thirumal asked them, "You all have lied to Sivan that I was dead over there. Since you told such a great lie, now Kaliyan was created and along with him the evil arrived and see the sufferings due to that. On what ground you all told that?" Devas stood without answering with bowed-heads. Being aware of the mind of Devas, Thirumal told them that since they have made the circumstance to be worse, they all should take birth in the Kali Yuga. Devas had nothing but to agree to that order.

Then Thirumal, holding the power of Trimurthis within himself told devas, "For creating you all in the Bhoo Loga, I've already given birth to seven devas from seven logas in the world as Santror in Ayothya Amirtha Vanam. And they have spread by generations over there. You all have to take birth in their community." By hearing this, the Devas told Thirumal, "When we are taking birth in the Kaliyuga which is enclosed by the evil of Kali, thyself should protect us from the evil." Thirumal told that, "I can't do so. Once you take birth in Kaliyuga the evil shall also influence you. But I shall come over there and forgive all your sins which are committed by the influence of Kali." Hearing this, the devas accepted to take birth in Kali Yuga.

== The rejection of Sampoorana Devan ==
But one among them named Sampoorana Devan, came up and told that, "I too accept to take birth in the Bhoo loga. But I have one demand." Thirumal asked what that is. He replied, "I am in love with Para Devathai of Yama Loga . She leaving here husband, is too in love with me. Unless you make her as my wife there in Bhoo Loga I have difficulties to take birth over there." Though Thirumal explained him that it's not good to have such a relation, Sampoorana Devan was not ready to forget his lady love. So Thirumal told him that, "In order to fulfill your need, you and herself shall perform austerity, without any other desires in your mind and once you have succeeded, you will be allowed to live with her." Accepting this, Sampoorana Devan along with Para Devathai went for performing austerity.

== The life-style of Fifty-five Rishis ==
Thirumal after sending them to austerity started to give birth to Devas of all logas in the world one by one. When it's the turn of Brahma Loga, they asked Thirumal, "Once, 55 Rishis were cursed to be statues by Brahma for stealing his texts. They are released from their curse as you touched them. They were also asked to live in the 55 nations of the world one for each nation, and they are living as per. And now when we too take birth over there, how we shall identify them and how do they identify us?"

Thirumal replied that those 55 rishis are living in the world continuously taking birth after their deaths. Thirumal also explained the symptoms of each of them so that they can identify them. They also will perform several miracles in the world there. Then I also will come to the world to destroy the Kali. At that time I will assemble all of them before me and will make them surrender all their powers to me and will kill them. And then they will be again made to take birth as your children in the same (Santror) community. Likewise all of you will be born and die continuously as per the rule of Kali Yuga till its end. Saying this, Thirumal made them to take birth in Bhoo Loga.

== See also ==
- Thirumal in Thiruvananthapuram
- Ayyavazhi mythology
- Akilathirattu Ammanai
- Travancore
- The Santror
