= Ayyavazhi ethics =

Ethics of Hindu denomination

The ethics of Ayyavazhi are found scattered throughout the primary scripture, Akilathirattu Ammanai. They are also integrated with the meta-narrative mythography. However, regarding ethics, Arul Nool is considered as an accumulation and prophecy of the core concepts found in Akilathirattu. In Akilathirattu, the ethical abstracts are pointed out as "told by God" at several places at different situations to lesser god-heads, devas, saints etc. when asked by them.

Arul Nool constitutes the major role in forming the Ayyavazhi ethics. It gives separately the social as well as divine ethics. It was believed that many portions of Arul Nool are lost.

== Neetham ==
Neetham is the primary virtues of Ayyavazhi religion. This is found in Akilathirattu Ammanai in the midst of meta narrative events of eight yugas. This shows that how the society, its people, the ruling king etc. lived in absolute harmony with nature, placing the power of almighty in all their works deeds and activities, during early ages.

The Akilathirattu points out this as an example, and there by says that how the people should live in the world. The Neethams are split into three. They are,

1. Manu Neetham: How an individual should personify him or herself.
2. Raja Neetham: How an individual should be to the society or Nation, and in turn how the Nation should be to a common man.
3. Deiva Neetham: How an individual should be before God.

This Neetham is found in Akilathirattu as saying how the people of early age lived in detail. It was derived from there as an ethical form that is to be followed.

== Vinchai by God ==
Vinchai is the rules and regulations provided by Lord Narayana to Vaikundar. Akilathirattu contains three such Vinchais. One immediately after the incarnation of Vaikundar from the sea and other two of them at Muttappathi after some of the incarnational activities. Though this was found as regulations provided by Narayana to Vaikundar, many of the acts found there fits also to humans and to be followed by human to improve their moral code.

Also the first Vinchai of Tiruchendur forms the largest ethical accumulation found in Akilam.

== Dharma ==
The Akilathirattu Ammanai the scripture of Ayyavazhi teaches Dharma on two different perspective. One in sociology as charity and another under spirituality to attain the stage of Oneness, unified into Vaikundar. The sociological way is asked to be followed by every one to attain the spiritual state of Dharma.

=== Sociological conception ===
The sociological definition to Dharma is generated as a concrete activity of charity or alms-giving. The principle of Dharma was considered as the mission of "protecting or salvaging the lowly, the oppressed". The disparity among the people is to be reduced and eradicated by this act of charity. A quote in Vinchai reads, "To uplift the lowly is dharmam". In this way, people were specially exhorted to undertake charity on material goods, and do it without discriminating among the beneficiaries. The great Indian saint Swami Vivekananda applied this principle of Ayyavazhi Dharma concept in practice and this may lead support to some followers of Ayyavazhi who claim that he was influenced by the religion.

=== Spiritual conception ===
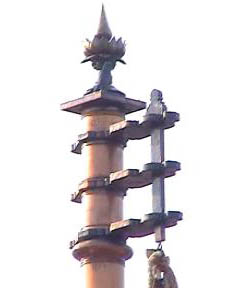
The Flagmast of Swamithoppe with Ayyavazhi symbol at the top

Transposed to the spiritual plane, the concept of Dharma is propounded as 'principle of righteousness'. Ayyavazhi asserts that the prime motive of the Avatar of Vaikundar was to establish Dharma in this world by destroying the evil force of Kaliyan. The definition of Kali in Ayyavazhi is focused as the materialized life. So spiritual understanding of Dharma in Ayyavazhi is the life in ultimate harmony with nature or unbounded by space and time. The narration of the concept 'Ekam', 'the ultimate oneness' in Akilam right from the beginning points out it clearly. And after ending the Kali Yukam, Dharma Yukam, the 'world of righteousness', is said to be ruled over by Vaikundar as an ever lasting King. But on the way, it detached the caste identities by stating that it was not suited for the present Kali Yukam. A quote in Akilam reads,

"Cast away the head-shaking devils and the eighteen castes in to the sea, mountain and fire."

== See also ==
- Main teachings of Ayya Vaikundar
- Ayyavazhi theology
- List of Ayyavazhi-related articles
- Akilathirattu Ammanai
