= Akilam one =

The Akilam one is the first among the seventeen parts of Akilathirattu Ammanai, the religious book of Ayyavazhi. This section includes the Kappu, the first part; it tells of the Detchanam, and describes the political and sociological situation in the early world.

== The Kappu ==
The word, Kappu, in Tamil means "the act of the author taking refuge in the Almighty before writing a book". Almost all the ancient works in Tamil begin with Kappu. In this case, however, the Kappu on the one hand functions as an act of the author taking refuge, and on the other hand, reveals the personal liberation of each and every life in the Universe. In this section the author says that, because of the coming of the Kaliyan, God incarnates the Santror to save and rule the universe under One Word, and I am he who heard which God says about that.

== Noolcchurikkam ==
This part provides a summary, in a grand style, of all the events of the Akilam from the beginning of the Universe to the end. It gives a little more information about the Vaikunda Avatharam. This part also includes the spread of God in the mind of the author before writing, and also Adiyeduttharulal (the act of giving the first verse of Akilam, by God to the author).

== Benefit of the Book ==
This is the part in which Akilam narrates briefly the benefits of it in a religious way. It says that one who hears its reading will attain Ultimate Completeness, and one who abuses it will be sentenced to Hell.

== Novelty of Detchanam ==
According to Akilathirattu, Santror took birth in this world before the Kali Yukam in Detchanam, and so this Detchanam is the Land of the earliest civilization of Human Beings. In this part, the novelty, sociology, and theology of the civilization were deeply narrated.

== Justice of Governance ==
This part tells about the way in which Chozhan (not to be confused with later Cholas), the king of Detchanam, rules his country at an early age, and so suggests the path by which a king should rule his country.

== Justice of Divinity ==
This part tells about the thought of people about the Almighty and about their religious harmony during that age, and tells the way by which one should be divinized.

== Justice of Common Man ==
This part of the book tells us about the moral character of the people, and also their way of life in harmony with nature, particularly women.

== Integrity of Castes ==
This part describes the caste system in the early days. It says that although there were several castes, it was merely a classification; the people of different castes lived as one caste without antipathy.

== Neetiya Yukam ==
The very first yukam (which is pronounced yugam in Tamil, and which means "aeon") was called Neetiya Yukam. During this time, divine, human, and all other virtues flourished without hindrance. The human race lived united as a family, without distinctions of caste, and were not subjected to uliyams (pronounced oozhiyam, and meaning slavery or severe labour). They did not fear demons, and there was perfect harmony among the creatures of the Earth, as well as among those who lived in the Fourteen Worlds. In this yukam, the king was righteous and did not oppress his people through taxes or other means.

During this peaceful time, Kroni was born. Kroni, who is analogous to Satan in the Christian tradition, is viewed as a primordial personification of evil. Though Kroni is said to have been born with multitudinous limbs, each the size of a mountain, he nevertheless assumes different forms in different yukams: for example, as Ravana or Duroyodhana. In opposition, Vishnu also incarnates in different yukam with different Avatars, for example Rama or Krishna.

In order to quell the ravenous hunger in his stomach, Kroni drank all of the waters of the sea. With these waters being insufficient, he swallowed Kailayam, the abode of Sivan (Shiva), then proceeded to devour the entire universe. Mayon, residing with Isvaran (another name for Shiva) in Kailayam, escaped to undertake tavam (tapas, meaning "austerity") to receive permission from Isvaran to destroy Kroni. Isvaran granted this permission, but made Mayon aware of the necessity to appear in different forms in the successive six Yukams in order to destroy the Six Fragments of Kroni. Following this advice, Mayon sliced Kroni into six fragments, and saved the universe. The first yukam thus came to an end.

== Chathura Yukam ==
According to Ayyavazhi mythology, in the second yukam, called Chathura Yukam, one of the six Pieces of Kroni was formed as a creature called Kuntomasali in the shape and size of a mammoth leech, and when it disturbed the tavam of those in Thavalokam, Mayon destroyed it by catching it in a hook.

== Request of Devas ==
After the two Yukams are completed, Devas requested of Sivan that as they did not find anyone claiming boons in the previous Yukams, so in the following Yukams, the Asuras should be created with the capability of thinking and looking smart, and they should claim boons, and so live prosperously.

== Netu Yukam ==
In the ensuing Netu Yukam, according to Ayyavazhi mythology, another fragment of Kroni was created into two wicked persons called Thillaimallalan and Mallosivahanan. They ruled over the people most wickedly, by extracting Uliyam and Iraikal (taxes) from them. When it became unbearable, the Thevarkal (celestial beings) complained to Isvaran, who in turn, commissioned Mayon to carry out the destruction of the wicked rulers, which he later did.

== Kretha Yukam ==
This part tells about the fourth aeon, called Kretha Yukam. The third fragment of Kroni was, once again, made into two siblings called Suraparppan and Sinkamuka Suran, and they were given responsibility to rule the earth. The wicked rulers began to crush the Thevarkal, who once again reported it to Mayon.
