= Akilam four =

Kaliyan's Boons: India

Akilam four is the fourth section of Akilathirattu Ammanai, the primary scripture of Ayyavazhi. This section narrates the prosperous life of Santror after their marriage with the daughters of King Nirupathi. It also describes the birth of Kaliyan, his cruel activities and its impact in the world.

This section describes the genesis of modern human civilization and the universal transformation which is initiated by the beginning of Kali Yuga, thereby causing a rapid decline of the divine powers which exist until then. It also profess that all the ruling powers were surrendered to Vishnu from Sivan and other god-heads at the start of the Kali Yuga.

== The life of Santror ==
After their marriage, the Santror lived a divine life as per the Neetham in the palaces which was offered by Kali to them. Before the advent of Kali the Santror beget children. This dynasty gradually learned the various life arts including, trade, deep-sea navigation, etc. But on the other hand, they didn't fail to respect Palmyra and treated the juice of it as celestial nectar. The then Chola wondered about the talents of Santror and ordered his troops to fulfill all the wants and needs of them. He also craved the efficiency of Santror in his Palace. The Santror served as the protective agents of the ancient Chozha Kingdom. Thus Santror lived in harmony with the Chozha dynasty.

== Creation of Kaliyan ==
After a long period, a saint named Kuru visited Kailash. He reminded Sivan that as previously planned, only five fragments of Kroni have been given birth and the final fragment is yet to take birth. It is the right time to give birth to the sixth fragment of Kroni in the world. Sivan told that, Vishnu is yet to come by finishing the sixth Yuga and on his return, he would inform about it to him.

The Kuru saint replied that Vishnu, by ending his previous Avatar and was on a divine sleep to take birth again. To get the opinion about this from the Devas, Siva assembled the devas of all logas and ask for their feedback. Devas unanimously accepted to give birth to the final fragment. And Siva decided to create the next fragment as Kaliyan. The moment he made the decision, the fragment took birth inverted (head-down and legs-up) in the world. On hearing heard this, Sivan asked qualities of the Kaliyan to Chithrabuthira. Chithrabuthira detailed the qualities, the physical body, the mind-set of Kaliyan. Then Sivan ordered devas to bring Kaliyan in front of him.

== Boons to Kaliyan ==
As per the order Kaliyan was brought before Sivan. And the devas told Kaliyan that Sivan was the one who created you and he will offer you whatever you need. First refused to accept that, but when a beautiful women named Kalicchi was created for him, he believed the words of Devas. He was then asked to claim what ever he wants. So Kaliyan started demanding the terrible boons that he wanted. On hearing this everyone was shocked.

For offering the boons claimed by Kaliyan, Sivan created Agatheesar from his mind and ordered him to give whatever Kaliyan needs, and Agatheesar did so. Then Kaliyan, along with Kalicchi enters the world.

== The rule of Kaliyan ==
On his way, Vishnu met Kaliyan and made him to promise that, if he disturbs any Pantaram (Sanyasins) in the world, he himself will go to hell. Then he cursed the Chakra as Money and offered to Kaliyan. When Kaliyan entered the world, all good or white beings left the world. Then Kaliyan with his cruel and powerful boons started ruling the world, breaking the rule of Neetham. So Devas, unable to tolerate the cruelty of Kaliyan requested Sivan to find solution in the matter of Kaliyan. Sivan discussed with the devas to call Vishnu for their rescue. Devas accepted for that and so Sivan performs Tavam towards Vishnu. Hearing about the Tavam of Sivan, Vishnu went to Kailash. Sivan told about the cruelty of Kaliyan and asked the method of destroying him. Vishnu gave some solution for Sivan for the destruction of Kaliyan.

== See also ==
- Akilathirattu Ammanai
- The Santror
- Kaliyan
- Boons offered to Kaliyan
