= Inclusiveness and exclusivity in Ayyavazhi =

The concepts of inclusivism and exclusivism in Ayyavazhi refer to how Ayyavazhi scriptures treat the ideologies of other religions. Ayyavazhi scriptures exhibit a distinct blend of both inclusivism and exclusivism. The religion's central text, the Akilam, accepts the views of different religions for a certain period but eventually rejects them, asserting that previous traditions have lost their substance. This narrative forms a central mythos in the religion.

== View on gods ==
Ayyavazhi accepts the deities of several religions, including the Islamic concept of Allah and most deities in Hinduism. The Vaishnavite concept of Maha Vishnu is frequently referenced in Ayyavazhi scriptures, which also acknowledge his avatars, such as Narasimha, Rama, and Krishna. Furthermore, the Akilam glorifies the activities of Vishnu and states that Vaikundar is the son of Narayana. The texts incorporate the Saivite concept of Parasiva and the Trimurti, describing Shiva as the supreme head of the Deva Sanga. They also recount events involving the Tamil god Muruga; however, unlike in Hinduism, Muruga is considered one of the six primary Avatars of Vishnu. The Akilam refers to Vaikundar as Thanumal Vethan, meaning he is the embodiment of Shiva, Vishnu, and Brahma. The religion's meta-narrative references other deities such as Ganapathi, Indra, Varuna, and Vayu, as well as female deities like Lakshmi, Sarasvati, Parvati, Kali, and the Saptha Kannis. These deities are attributed powers similar to those described in Hindu scriptures. All these divine powers are viewed as lesser manifestations of the single supreme power, Ekam.

However, Ayyavazhi theology asserts that due to the advent of Kaliyan and his cruel boons, the supreme God (Ekan) incarnated in the world as Vaikundar. Consequently, all other deities surrendered to Vaikundar, and all previous scriptures lost their substance. For the Kaliyukam, Vaikundar is declared the only worshipable God, channeling Ayyavazhi theology toward exclusivism.

The texts also reference deities from Abrahamic traditions. It states that Narayana, part of the Ayyavazhi Trinity, incarnated as Christ. Quotes from the Akilam and the Arul Nool also refer to the Islamic conception of Allah.

Through these references, the Akilam reveals an inclusive view of the divine, accepting different religions' concepts of God. A quote in the text addresses Vaikundar, saying, "You move around the world in various forms," suggesting that a single God is worshipped under different names globally.

== View on scriptures ==
The manner in which the Akilathirattu Ammanai treats the scriptures of different religions is complex. While it extensively references the Vedas, Shastras, Agamas, and Puranas, it claims these scriptures lost their substance in two stages: first at the advent of Kaliyan, and later during the incarnation of Vaikundar.

According to the text, Kaliyan obtained the powers of various Hindu scriptures, including the Vedas, as a boon from Shiva. He also received the form of a Brahmin as a boon and made numerous alterations to the true scriptures. As a result, these scriptures and their powers fell under Kaliyan's control, rendering them incapable of providing divine knowledge. During the incarnation of Vaikundar, the ruling power of the Deva Sanga shifted from Shiva to Vishnu, and then to Vaikundar, as the incarnation of the supreme Ekam. With the universal power vested in Vaikundar, the texts mandate that no other God should be worshipped. Because all previous texts had lost their substance, God provided the world with a new scripture unaffected by Kaliyan: the Akilam. While the Akilam accepts the deities of non-Dharmic faiths, it completely rejects their scriptures.

When Kalineesan arrested Vaikundar and took him to Thiruvananthapuram, the Akilam (13:227–231) narrates: "As once on the non-liberative Cross, suffered the beatings of thorns, dead and reanimates for uplifting the poor, for this yuga here, he suffers this for the liberation of the downtrodden." This verse implies that Vaikundar previously incarnated as Jesus, showing an acceptance of Christ; however, the religion does not recognize the Bible. A quote in the Vinchai about Venneesan states, "He created a Veda [scripture] of his own intention." Regarding the Bible and Kaliyan, the Akilam (10:244) says, "There will be a religion of him which tells the world to treat greatly, the Cross." Likewise, the Akilam views the term 'Allah' in relation to the supreme power Ekam, but it rejects the religion of Islam. The text (10:243) states, "There will be another which makes a call to the world to put upon caps."

While Ayyavazhi accepts the incarnations of Rama and Krishna, it appears to reject the Ramayana and the Mahabharata, as neither is mentioned. It historically accepts only the four Vedas as the "Books of Perfection." This aligns somewhat with Hinduism, which views the Vedas as Śruti (primary scripture) and texts like the Ramayana as Smriti (secondary scripture). However, because Kaliyan altered and claimed the Vedas as a boon, they lost their substance. To counter this, God incarnated as Vaikundar, establishing the Akilathirattu Ammanai as the only "Book of Perfection" for the present age.

== Ultimate exclusivism ==
According to the Akilathirattu, the Vedas were originally the only religious texts to be followed. Religions built around other incarnations of God were created by the intentions of men, not God. Because the Vedas were corrupted by Kaliyan, the Akilam—which describes the incarnation of the supreme God, Ekam—is now considered the only valid "Book of Perfection." Ultimately, Ayyavazhi rejects all other scriptures in favor of the Akilathirattu Ammanai.

== See also ==
- Ayyavazhi
- Ayya Vaikundar
- Akilathirattu Ammanai
