= Akilam two =

Akilam Two is the second among the seventeen parts of Akilathirattu Ammanai, the holy scripture of Ayyavazhi. This parts includes the whole of the Thretha Yukam and a few events of the Dwapara Yukam, such as creation of bodies of the god-heads and subjects of the yukam.

== Creating Thretha Yukam ==
After the destruction of the asuras of the previous Kretha Yukam, Nathan stayed in the sea-shore of Thiruchendur as Kantha. At that time, Sivan and Vethan meet Nathan for discussing the further events to be done. At that time Sivan remembered to Nathan that, "The ancient Kroni had been sliced and all but three more fragments are remaining to be given birth in the world." Hearing this all of them discussed about and decided to give birth to the next fragment and thereby create the next Yuga.

During the creation Nathan told Sivan that, at his previous manifestation during his death, he insulted me by saying, "Only with your ten nails which were made of ten mountains you were able to kill me and otherwise not." So in this yuga, he should be created as a mighty being with ten heads, twenty eyes, twenty ears and with appropriate body parts and Tatvas etc. As per the instructions Ravana was created. Then from the 'blood of Kroni' which is taken from the pit where it was gathered during the destruction of Kroni, the Asura race was created. When these people are created, Nathan assembled some sweat from his golden body and created a person with the name Vibhishana and made him the brother of Ravana. And Afterwards ordered him that, "Besides all the activities of Ravana you should remain polite."

== Ravana Claiming boons ==
Ravana for claiming boons, stood humbly in front of Sivan. Seeing this Sivan asked him to ask what ever needed. Ravana replied that Sivan should promise on Ganapathi that he will give what ever asked by Ravana. Then on the promise of Sivan, Ravana started claiming.

- I should be mighty enough that the Devas, Rishis and the weapons of the three Logas must not defeat me.
- The Sun, Moon and all celestial objects should revolve around my forts.
- Yourself Sivan should give ten million boons
- The God of Creation, - Brahma should give ten million boons
- The Umaiyaal should give me ten million boons
- Indra should give half a crore of boons.

Ravana claimed all these boons and Sivan prepared himself to offer the boons. At that time Lekhsmi arrived there and seated near Parvati. On seeing the beauty of Lekhsmi, Ravana in lust stood passionate. At that very moment, Sivan understood the stunned mind-situation of Ravana and offered the boons claimed by him immediately. So Ravana while possing the boons was not much deliberated.

On the way of Ravana, returning from Kayilai, Nathan deliberately snatched away thirty million boons from him and minimised the number to five million boons. So soon, Ravana got such a large quantity of boons, had to loose almost all.

== Brutal reign of Ravana ==
Ravana ordered the Trimurthis and Devas around like slaves. He demanded Vayu to clean his bell-towers or he will be murdered. Ravana ordered the Sun and Moon to bow their heads when they approach his nation or otherwise be destroyed by his arrows. The 'Deva-Kannis' (Virgin Angels) were instructed to stand beside him and fan him or they will be bound in a tree. All four Vedas and six Shastras were to carry milk-pot and stand respectfully before him or they would be murdered too. The Devas were to praise him with strewing flowers. He even stated for all the kings in the world to obey him and pay him tributes.

=== Invocation of Devas ===
While Ravana ruled cruelly, the time for karma arrived. The Devas and the human beings of the Bhoologa, being unable to withstand the cruelty of Ravana, invocated to Thirumal. Thirumal on hearing the plea, calmed them and went to Kayilai to visit Siva.

== Thirumal meeting Sivan ==
There in Kayilai, Thirumal met Sivan and told, "Since you offered several crores of boons to Ravana he, as setting the Devas, Indra and other divine beings as shielders on all directions of his fort was ruling as an un-counterable king. His cruel activities towards his subjects are innumerable. I can't ignore their plea and sleep peacefully in Vaikundam. There is nobody there to save them other than us. So for destroying him, what is to be done to kill him? What kind of avatar should I need to come with? Please tell, the incomparable supreme." Sivan replied, "I can't snatch away the boons which I granted him once." Hearing this, Thirumal was disappointed and thought deeply in search of any other ways. Then he said, "King Dasarata is performing austrity that I must born as a son to him and on the other hand Dinakaran is on austrity that Lekshmi should born as a daughter for him.

== Dvapara Yukam ==
This section also includes descriptions about the events in Dvapara Yukam and the Krishna avataram.

== See also ==
- Ayyavazhi mythology
- Thretha Yukam
- Akilathirattu Ammanai
