= Ayyavazhi wedding =

Indian wedding custom

An Ayyavazhi wedding is the wedding custom within the Ayyavazhi belief system of South India. Usually Dharmagharttas, Panividaiyalars from Thangals or an older person experienced in Ayyavazhi assumes a role as a Guru and is seated in the Manvarai for leading the wedding ceremony.

As in Hinduism, the institution of marriage has a deep significance and meaning in Ayyavazhi. It is viewed as a sacrament and not a contract. The family-life is also taught as the foremost austerity.

In Ayyavazhi the weddings are conducted in temporary sheds usually when the weddings are conducted at home. But a few thangals used wedding in the Manavarai, which is also called as Kamanam.

== The Manavarai and Panividai ==
The manavarai is the temporary shed arranged and decorated for performing the wedding ceremony in Ayyavazhi tradition. It was constructed with nine pillars representing the nine planets. Two pillars are situated at each of the four corners and one additional pillar is made of a branch of a banyan tree. The banyan branch symbolizes the prosperous life. It is also decorated with oil lamps and decorative lights and papers.

Usually, if the weddings are conducted at Pathis or Nizhal Thangals the Manavarai is not made. Instead, a raised pedestal is arranged for the bride and bridegroom, in the case of Nizhal Thangals. The Kalyana Vazhthu is also sung in Thangals. Also in Pathis other than Swamithope pathi, the ceremony is the same. But if the weddings are conducted in Swamithoppe Pathi, the couple is made to stand in front of the Pathi. The bridegroom ties the Golden Thali (wedding badge) around the neck of the bride while standing. No Kalyana Vazhthu is sung believing as the belief in Swamithoppe is that all divine powers are existing and no need to invite them by singing the Kalyana Vazhthu.

Namam, Patham, Jasmine, Coconut, Bananas, lemons, betel and areca nut are considered auspicious objects and are kept and treated sacredly. Including all these a Panividai is kept in the Kamanam assumed religiously as for inviting Ayya there in the marriage -shed. No other objects such as arathi, Camphor or fragrant sticks are used in the Ayyavazhi marriages.

== Wedding ceremony ==
The wedding ceremony is celebrated in the bride's residence and so the bridegroom and his relatives arrive there while auspicious music is played. Immediately after the bride groom's arrival, the bride's relatives welcome them at the entrance by sprinkling fragrant waters and sandal. Then both groups move to the marriage hall. In the first part of the ceremony, the bride is made to be seated in the Kamanam for some practices.

The wedding garments of the bride are brought by the bridegroom and so the bride is taken and dressed in them. Meanwhile, the bridegroom is seated at the place arranged for him in the Kamanam. The bridegroom wears a headgear called a Thalaippagai. A five-faced Kuthu vilakku (oil lamp) lighted and placed near the panividai in front of the couple. Then the bride is brought back and seated to the left of the bride groom. The couple is seated facing the geographic south facing the mythical Dwaraka pathi, which is believed to be in the sea. It is assumed as if Ayya as Siva is conducting the wedding from the place of Guru.

Also it is believed that all the deva-sangam are invited to the marriage and are seated in the Kamanam during the ceremony of marriage to bless the couple. Apart from the couple, the guru, preferably an elder man, a Payyan or a Thangal Panividaiyalar is seated in the Manavarai. Children, especially girls with small lighted lamps in trays standceremoniously around the Kamanam. All others remain seated around the Kamanam.

Then the wedding ceremony begins. The guru applies the sacred Namam to the forehead of the bride and the groom. He also recites the Kalyana Vazhthu of Arul Nool, while the relatives follow along. The Kalyana vazhthu has three phases and contains fifty-six verses. The first phase tells how the marriage is arranged by Narayana. It also describes the giant ceremonious arrangements, practices and decorations for the marriage. It is meant in the way that all the Deva-sangha arrived there, accepting the invitation of Narayana, the father of Santror. The second phase is the sacred quotes for marriage. It consists of two verses;

"Arahara endru ammai-umai thaamezhunthu"
"Siva-siva endru thiru-charadu Serthanare."

The first line is repeated five times during which the bridegroom prepares with divine mind. Then while the guru chants the second line he uses to tie it around the neck of the bride. The relatives gather around and wish the couple luck by throwing flowers over them. Drums and all other music is played. The third phase is meant in the way that all the devas praise and wish the couple for their divine and prosperous life, in the name of Lord Vaikundar. It is a congregational-singing. Normally, this chanting lasts about seven minutes. This wedding custom in Ayyavazhi is simple and all the prayer forms and the mantras are in Tamil language.

Then the husband use to wear a garland to his wife and then the vice versa. The husband holds his wife's hands, and circles the Kamanam five times. The girls with the lighted lamps follow them. After the couple is again seated in the Kaman, all the close relatives individually wish the couple good fortune by sprinkling the holy 'Patham' over their head five times.

After the wedding meals the bridegroom takes his wife to his residence. The meal during Ayyavazhi marriages is strictly vegetarian. The guru who leads the wedding ceremony will be served first.

== Bride groom's residence ==
Then in the evening the relatives of the bride visit the bridegroom's house bearing marriage gifts. This is called Veedu-kanal, which means "seeing the house in which the couple is going to live." They also bring a variety of pastries and snacks for the couple. Then, after dinner, they return home. Thus the wedding ceremony is completed.

The marriage is considered as austerity as per Ayyavazhi tradition. The couple takes an oath and begin the Tavam in front of the gathering. Also marriage is considered the source of inner knowledge of life according to the Ayyavazhi ideas.

== See also ==
- Ayyavazhi rituals
