= Ayyavazhi religious studies =

The religious studies of Ayyavazhi are based primarily on the Ayyavazhi scriptures. Though there is enough knowledge there for a common worshiper to understand Ayyavazhi theology, it needs the Hindu and at some times the scriptures of other religions (including abrahamic) to be referred to undergo a detailed religious study on Akilam. Because Akilam maintains a unique type of relation with the other scriptures.

On one hand it rejects Hindu scriptures by saying that they have lost their divinity by the activities of Kali, but on the other many of the theological, mythical as well as philosophical terms and concepts from Hindu scriptures are adopted directly and indirectly. However it's unavoidable to refer Hindu scriptures to find more details about the ideology of Akilam.

== Mythology ==
It was considered that one should have a basic knowledge about the Hindu scriptures and its concepts to get into the philosophical study of Ayyavazhi. Almost all the God-heads either lesser or higher in power found in Akilam with only a least and undetailed introduction on their how and whereabouts. They just plays their part to the long mythical story-line of the Ayyavazhi mythology. But to understand the core philosophy of that event and the reason behind the involvement of that God-head to that event one should have already known the details about that particular God-head, which was not found in Akilam. Also only there a least possibility to know the relationship between several mythical figures other than the higher God-heads. And for all these details including their story-background, origin etc.

Regarding mythology The Mahabharata, Ramayana, Kantha Purana, Vishnu Purana, etc. all found place with limited details in Akilam. Akilam provides all these collectively with a mutual relation with each other in an overall story line which makes it unique. But to understand the whole knowledge for example Treta Yuga, the scripture which includes those events in detail should needed to be referred. Though the event related to the same Treta Yuga is found in Akilam, it includes only the main events which are directly related to the maintained story-line. Same in the matter of Mahabharata and kantha Purana. Apart from these many mythical events are found in brief Akilam which is found in detail in Siva purana, Santror purana etc. Overall, all the Pre-Kali Yuga events are mentioned briefly in Akilam and more details about them which is essential to undergo a religious study on Akilam may be collected from the Hindu texts.

However Akilam includes more details about the events in Kali Yuga than that of the previous and further more from the incarnation of Vaikundar. But on the other hand, it again needs a good knowledge about the Hindu concepts such as Nirguna and Saguna Brahman, rather than mythology for one who wants to know about the supremacy of Vaikundar.

== Theology ==
The Akilam-based theology is not a constant one since it deals with the whole events right from the creation to the end. It undergoes different theologies from polytheism to monotheism and monism, though monism is the final and overall focus point for the present yuga. It is viewed closely to the mythical events that take place at various ages and so it changes often. Monism in the beginning (creation), polytheism till the end of Dvapara Yuga, then some sort of henotheism till the advent of Vaikundar; and then on monism again. All these changes are closely tied to the appropriate mythical events and so all stories related to these changes should be known in detail to understand the evolution of the philosophy of Akilam through the ages.

Also since from the incarnation of Vaikundar all previous individual God-heads are surrendered and assembled within Vaikundar, then onwards he is the responsible one for the activities of all god-heads. All the works to be done by them will be performed by Vaikundar. So it is unavoidable to know about the nature, quality and powers of all those god-heads to understand the quality and power extension of Vaikundar. So again the details of those surrendered god-heads to be collected from the Hindu texts. But if Akilam has any different ideas about any particular event or any origin of God-heads, mentioned elaborately in Hindu texts, then it will be found in detail in Akilam. And so for that, Akilam forms the foremost source and need not be referred from previous Hindu texts.

== Concepts ==
Many, almost all philosophical concepts from Hinduism are found in Akilam. Some of them are completely accepted, some are regenerated while some others are rejected by omitting. Most of the Hindu concepts are just found mention in Akilam with merely their name and the rest with their details left to be collected from the Hindu texts. Some of them are regenerated by giving different ideas. It includes the concepts, Yuga, evil, Moksha, Maya (Kali) etc. Several other concepts such as Tatvas, Kosas, Chakras, Karma, reincarnation, Sariyai, Kiriyai, Yoga etc. are accepted.

However, Akilam maintains the rejection of all previous scriptures throughout but knowledge about several basic concepts from them are important to understand Akilam. So generally it was considered that, once a particular event or concept which is needed is not found well-described in Ayyavazhi scriptures such as Akilattirattu Ammanai or Arul Nool, (as detail as in Hindu scriptures) and instead simply have quoted it with their names, then that particular conception is accepted as in Hindu scriptures for religious studies. But when the idea of a particular notion of Akilam differs very much from Hindu scriptures, that particular thing is deeply described. However, in a particular thing if both Akilam and Hindu scriptures have different ideas, then that of Akilam only is accepted. There is also a view that Akilam is a guideline to follow the Hindu scriptures.

== See also ==
- Akilattirattu Ammanai
- Ayyavazhi beliefs
- Ayyavazhi mythology
