= Yukam =

Yukam may refer to:

- Chathura Yukam, Ayyavazhi mythology topic
- Dharma Yukam, Ayyavazhi mythology topic
- Dwapara Yukam, Ayyavazhi mythology topic
- Netu Yukam, Ayyavazhi mythology topic
- Thretha Yukam, Ayyavazhi mythology topic
