= Katuvai Sothanai =

Katuvai Sothanai, in Tamil means, Trial with Tiger. This is an important event in Ayyavazhi mythology tells us about the happenings that took place when Lord Vaikundar was thrown before a three-days-starving tiger.

As per the order of the king of Thiruvithankur (Kalineesan), a commander summoned his soldiers and ordered them to fetch a tiger. They were threatened to be hanged if they failed in bringing a tiger. The soldiers, being terrified, implored Vaikundar to help them get a tiger. Lord Vaikundar, knowing their predicament, enabled them to get hold of a tiger. The soldiers, acknowledging and praising the divine powers of Vaikundar, returned to the prison with the tiger. The tiger was put in a cage for a few days without any food. On a particular day, in the presence of ministers, administrators, and different sections of the army Vaikundar was thrown into the tiger's cage. What a miracle it was! The tiger, knowing its creator, did not jump on the prey, but lay there unmoved. The soldiers, being vexed at the strange behaviour of the ferocious animal, tried to provoke it. One of the soldiers used the back of a long spear to prod the animal to action. It so happened that the tiger caught hold of the spear tightly, and, the soldier, trying to extricate the spear, pulled it out vehemently. Quite unexpectedly, the tiger left the spear and, alas, the sharp point of the spear pierced through a priest who was standing among the spectators and killed him.

Hearing the alarming news, fear gripped the king. He lamented saying: "killing a priest will invite a curse more severe than that of killing a thousand cows".He immediately withdrew his soldiers from torturing Vaikundar. On the other hand, devotees of Vaikuntar were enthralled, and their faith increased. They spread this news to one and all in every direction.(see: Ayyavazhi mythology)

== See also ==
- List of Ayyavazhi-related articles
