= Thirukkalyana Ekanai =

Thirukkalyana Ekanai was an important part in Akilathirattu Ammanai the religious book of Ayyavazhi, in which Lord Vaikundar unified all the atmans (souls) of this universe into himself.

== See also ==
- Ayyavazhi mythology
- List of Ayyavazhi-related articles
