= Nadutheervai Ula =

The Nadutheervai (judgement) Ula (journey) ("The journey to final judgement") is a part of Arul Nool, one among the sources of Ayyavazhi mythology. This part tells about the happenings of the world in the end or at the day which Kali destroys.
