= The Santror =

Mythical figures in Ayyavazhi mythology

The Santror are the seven boys who were brought to life by using the seven seeds from seven upper worlds, by Thirumal, to the Seven Virgins through their instrumentality, according to Ayyavazhi mythology. It also represents their descendants. According to Akilathirattu Ammanai, it additionally represents one who lives with Dignity.

Santror Makkal is an alternative name for The Santror, frequently used in Akilathirattu Ammanai.

== Birth of Santror ==
Santror Pirappu (The Birth of Santror): according to Ayyavazhi mythology, Thirumal, one of the three godheads, made Saptha Kanniyar (seven virgins) give birth to seven boys. This event is described here.

The Seven Virgins were faithful devotees of Sivan. They regularly served at his feet a lump of water that they could miraculously gather in their hands. This water came from the mythical river Ayotha Amirtha Gangai in which they bathed daily.

One day, Thirumal came upon these women and asked them to serve him instead of Sivan for a day. The women refused to his request, insisting they would only serve the all-powerful Sivan. Having been refused, Thirumal vowed to teach them a lesson while still fulfilling the divine plan of bringing forth his children through them. He then took seven seeds from the Seven Logas above. When the women left the river after their baths, he caused the gentle cold wind (Vayu) to blow and the rain (Varuna) to lightly fall. When the women were shivering, Thirumal appeared to them again, this time in the form of fire. The women immediately encircled the flame. Thirumal then placed the seven seeds inside the wombs of each of the women. They instantly conceived and delivered seven boys. They were called Santror Makkal.

Realizing that they were delayed in their service to Sivan, the women left the infants in the river in a fist of fear and rushed to gather the water. Yet they could only gather the water in the shape of a mere ball. It was then they realized that they had been deceived. Not only could they not serve the feet of Sivan but they also could not raise the boys. They undertook a rigorous Tavam and awaited the manifestation of Thirumal as Ayya Vaikundar in Kali Yukam. He had promised to marry them and to make their sons rulers of the land by destroying the Kalineesan and Kalimayai.

== The Naming Ceremony of Santror ==
In The Naming Ceremony of Santror, Thirumal, acting as a Pantaram, made the Seven Virgins, who were to give birth to seven boys using seven seeds from seven upper worlds. The seven sons were reared personally by Thirumal.

One day, a grand ceremony was organized for the naming of the children. The whole pantheon of Gods and Goddesses attended the ceremony.

The eminent God Sivan/Iswaran (Shiva) gave them the first name as Chanars because, one of the characteristics of these people was ‘perseverance in seeking and obtaining even the invisible goal’. The sage Vetha (Vethamuni) gave a name as Santror to signify the characteristics of nobility and integrity, Thirumal called them as Natalvar. Similarly, other gods and goddesses gave them very prestigious titular names. Having named them with great attributes, all the deities sang lullabies in praise of their glory. Sarasvati, the popular deity, praised them as children born with powers of knowledge, wisdom, and artistic skills and as the future kings who were going to rule the earth with justice, righteousness, and love.

== Feeding the children ==
According to Ayyavazhi mythology the Santror Makkal born of Seven Virgins were named and after the naming ceremony, Shiva and Thirumal, wanting to feed the children with celestial nectar, commanded the celestial attendants to bring the same. When they went to bring the nectar, they found it emptied by a priest and his wife who while ‘dressing themselves as per the rules of the scriptures’, had been drinking the whole measures of nectar to their full. By this, they had increased the fat in their own body, depriving others of their share. When the celestial attendants reported this matter to Shiva and Thirumal, the later rebuked the Priest and his wife, and made them grow as Palmyra trees on earth to feed his children perpetually by giving back the Celestial nectar in the form of Palm-juice.

== Fostering the children ==
Now, the illustrious deity Badrakali, being commissioned by Isvaran to subdue Takkan, a wicked ruler who had squeezed the labour of the people, stood in tavam to get the sons of Mayon (Thirumal) to support her in her battle. Granting the prayer, the children were entrusted to Badrakali to be fostered with full dignity and honour. She was warned that in case of any danger befalling the sons, she would be imprisoned once for all. Badrakali accepted the condition, and received the sons. As per the instruction of Isvaran, she taught them various martial arts, occupational skills, and fine arts. The children grew into adults, made progress in different trades and occupations. They also became adept at fighting wars. Once they excelled in war, Badrakali took them to wage the war against Takkan, and in the war, they crushed the forces of the enemy with extraordinary courage and valour.

As the seven sons attained the age of marriage, Badrakali arranged for their marriage with the seven daughters of Nirupathirajan, the famous king. The nuptial ceremony, being attended by the whole assembly of divinities, took place with all pomp and glory, having the brides and bridegrooms dressed in exquisite clothes and adorned with glistering ornaments. The couples lived happily under the tutelage of Badrakali and their progenies flourished. They undertook the trades of precious metals that earned them quite opulence. They excelled in martial prowess and were sought after by the kings of Chola kingdom. Even as they were living with fame and name, they drew their strength and courage from the milk they obtained from the palmyra tree that supported them. All these events took place during the last phase of the Dwapara Yukam.

== See also ==
- Ayyavazhi mythology
- List of Ayyavazhi-related articles
- Ayya Vaikundar
