= Ayyavazhi in reports by Christian missionaries =

Ayyavazhi, a belief system originating from South India, is mentioned in a number of reports by Christian missionaries in the 19th century. In some of these reports, it is claimed that Ayyavazhi is an anti-Christian religious phenomenon. The rapid growth of the London Missionary Society is heavily challenged by Ayyavazhi in Thiruvithancore, which is the most succeeded venue of LMS in India and revealed in certain reports.

== Reports of the London Mission Society ==
=== 1838 ===
This report says about the fast spread of Ayyavazhi then throughout the regions of Southern Kerala (then Travancore) and South Tamil Nadu (the then 'Tinnevely') as, "multitudes of people flocked from all parts of the provinces of Travancore and Tinnevelly."

One part of the report states that Ayya Vaikundar's devotees believe they were "cured by him of different diseases." On the Ayyavazhi religion, the report says that "multitudes of people flocked to him from all parts of Travancore and Tinnevelly." (p. 71)

On the Thuvayal Thavasu, the report goes on to say: "About seventy families of this sect, having subsequently established a community of goods, removed under the guidance of a man of some influence to a part of the sea-shore in Tinnevelly, where they erected huts, performed frequent ablutions, and often assembled to hear the dreams and vision of their leader and to witness the miracles he was said to perform." (p. 71)

Apart from this, it mentions the practice of vegetarianism in Ayyavazhi, saying that "[they] abstained from all kinds of animal food, and observed the most simple and abstentious habits".(p. 71)

This report is also a witness from any external source to show the interference of Travancore King into Ayyavazhi. This report says that, "The Government, however, interfered, and the excitement quickly died away." (p. 71)

The same report Call Vaikundar as a person of "deranged mind". (p. 71)

This report also calls Ayyavazhi as a "new and singular sect". (p. 71)

=== 1843 ===
In one part of these report, the missionaries view "Ayyavazhi" as an anti-Christian religious phenomenon, using such phrases as an "agent of Satan" (pp. 78–79) when referring to "Ayya Vaikundar", and further reported that large "numbers of the low classes have joined him (Vaikundar)."

The same report notes the "rapid and extraordinary career" of Vaikundacami (Vaikundar) (p. 75), mentioning that his religious phenomenon had "spread to an astonishing degree, showing by its progress." (p. 75)

The report also says that, "he is enabled to perform the cure of all diseases, and to confer innumerable blessings on his followers." (p. 75)

It also says that such a fast spread of Ayyavazhi created an excitement in the country as "so much excitement" and also that the majority was from low class of the society as, "numbers of the low classes have joined him". (p. 75)

In another part of the report, it mentions that Vaikundacami "asserts that one of the principle Hindu deities has taken up his abode within him," and that because of this, "he is enabled to perform the cure of all diseases, and to confer innumerable blessings on his followers." (p. 75)

The same report call the activities of Vaikundar as "amid these indications of advancement and the triumph (of LMS mission), it is painful to find that the agents of the prince of this world have been busily engaged in their malignant attempts to frustrate, if possible, the work of God. A negative religious imposter, named Vaikundacami, having gathered numerous disciples around him from among the heathen, has also succeeded in gaining over to his impious cause, several who had a profession of Christianity and stood in visible connection with the followers of the redeemer" (p. 78-79)

=== 1847 ===
This report provides information that around 10,000 people had joined the practice of Christianity, principally of the "Shanar tribe," an area near Patnam (Thengapattanam), and that, "an equal, if not greater, number had taken to Ayyavazhi." (p. 88-89)

Another report speaks of Vaikundar, treating diseases with only earth and water, stating: "They take no medicine; but rub ashes on the forehead and drink cold water (patham) as the cure for all diseases." (p. 88-89)

It also says that the followers of Ayyavazhi "have instituted a new mode of worship" in the place of the "pagan rites."

This report also says that, "they have instituted a new mode of worship, in which no images are introduced... They ... inveigh zealously against idols and demons, and profess only to worship an incarnation of Veeshnoo." (P. 88-89) This report also form one among the external evidences to the fact that Vaikundar is believed as an incarnation of God even as early in the time of Vaikundar.

=== 1858 ===
Again, as in the 1838 report, this report mentions the practice of vegetarianism in a disciple of Vaikundacami who, "abstained from flesh and ate only vegetables." And it refers to an active female follower of Ayyavazhi who "abstained from fish on Tuesdays and Fridays."

=== 1872 ===
In this report, Vaikundar had been viewed as a "False Prophet".

This report also call Swamithope as, "head-quarters of Mutthukuttiism." (P. 107)

=== 1892 ===
In this report, reference is made to those engaged in the practice of Thuvayal Thavasu. Specifically, a comparison appears to be made in the report that the devotees of Ayya Vaikundar, especially the Thuvayal Thavasu participants, keep their bodies and their houses cleaner than the other people of chanar tribe.

== Reports of the Nagercoil Mission District ==
=== 1864 ===
This report speaks of it as "a modern sect, greatly on the increase", says that, "day after day, numbers flocked to him (Vaikundar)" (Patrick p. 4, quoting Frederick Wilkinson, ARTDC 1864).

In this report a missionary Frederick Wilkinson opinioned negatively about Vaikundar as, "While young Muthukutti was a cowherd and afterwards became a palmyra-climber from the circumstance of his having a long and entangled plait of hair on his head he imagined he was specially favoured by the deity and got many to believe that he was the incarnation of Vishnu. Day after day numbers flocked to him." (P. 4)

This report says the special worship on Ayyavazhi centers as, "He ordered his followers to worship him especially on Sundays." (P. 4)

This report also says about the then construction of Swamithope Pathi as, "after his death they erected a tomb over his grave and a substantial building on the site in which they worship him." (P. 4)

The same report says that, "they (followers of Ayyavazhi) say that Muthukutti will come again, raise his followers from the dead." (P. 4)

=== 1866 ===
This is also a part which tells about the spread of Ayyavazhi. It says that "he (Vaikundar) drew after him a great many people" (Patrick p. 15, quoting Goodeve Mabbs from ARTDC 1866).

This report witness the monthly and yearly festivals in Swamithope Pathi as, "... built him a tomb, and hold monthly and yearly festivals in his honour." (P. 15)

This report also says that, "Many of the heathen now worship a new deity of the name Muttukutti."(P. 15).

=== 1874 ===
This report reads as, "It was in the village comprising this (Thamaraikulam) section that the gospel gained its earliest conquests in South Taravancore. Progress was rapid. Congregation were formed and adherents come over in great numbers. In 1821 there were upwards of 1200 converts in these place. It seemed as if the whole population would soon be brought under the influence of the cross. But a terrible check was given to our operations by the rise of Muthukuttyism. ... shrines rose, rites and ceremonies are initiated, temples were dedicated and lastly a car festival was instituted at Kottayady to which thousands are annually drawn from the towns and villages far and near. This cunning contrivance of Satan has much impeded our progress in these parts and s still a great power of darkness against which we have to wage unceasing war. Our weapon are mighty through God, to the pulling down of strongholds. We have truth on our side against which neither Muthukuttyism nor any other gate to hell shall prevail. All we need is more life in these churches..."

== Reports of Kottaram Mission District ==
=== 1871 ===
This report records the anguish of Mr Nathaneil, an evangelist of Jamestown, who 'deplored' the increase of the followers of Ayyavazhi in "several places around him." (Patrick p. 7, quoting S. Jones, ARTDC 1871).

== Reports of the Santhapooram District ==
=== 1858 ===
This report also views Ayyavazhi as an anti-Christian religion, speaking about a female shaman of Ayyavazhi, "a widow living at this place who was a follower of Vaikundacami. She was also a fortune-teller and pretended to cure diseases by incantations. She allowed her hair to grow matted like that of Pantaram, abstained from fish on Tuesdays and Fridays, performed her ablutions in the sea, sang for four or five hours together in honour of her swami and was occasionally under the influence of the devil." (Patrick p. 4-5, quoting Ebenezer Lewis, ARTDC 1858).

In this same report Ebenezer Lewis (a missionary) says about the way of worship if people in Ayyavazhi centers as, "they sing and dance in honour of their Swami."

=== 1859 ===
In this report Ebenezer Lewis (a missionary), calls Vaikundar as an "imposter". (P. 15)

This report presents the reply of an Ayyavazhi follower to a Christian Mossionary as, "We worship the true God, what business have you here? We need not your instructions, begone... Narayanan (Vaikuntacami) is the true God; it is he who created us... All who deny the divinity of Narayanana are fools and mad men, for no man of sense will do it." It also says that, "thousands continue to worship him still, believing that before long he will rise from the dead." (P. 15-16)

=== 1863 ===
This report says a public proclamation of a mendicant devotee of Ayyavazhi as, "at this time he was telling the people that the Swami Vaigundar is expected soon, that he has sent messages to his devotees upon the people and render the country prosperous." (P. 5)

=== 1864 ===
It says that, "Some years ago a Palmara clmber named Muthukutty claimed to be the incarnation of Vishnu and deceived many people. His followers had erected pagodas in many places. As they regard Muthukutty as incarnation of Vishnu, they affirm that the worship of Muthukutty is really a worship of the supreme being ........ This imposter is one of the chief obstacles to the spread of the gospel in these parts." (Page. 6-7)

== Reports of the Jamestown Mission District ==
=== 1863 ===
This report (says about the way of worship as, "the followers meet together in a building something smaller than... village Chapels" and "dancing and plenty of noise make up the greater part of the worship." (P. 4)

== Reports of the Tittuvilai Mission District ==
=== 1869 ===
This report says that, the people seem to have considered 'Vaikuntacami' (Vaikundar) as, "the last avatar of Vishnu." (P. 8)

== See also ==
- Outline of Ayyavazhi
- Travancore
- London Missionary Society
