= Neetham =

Set of religious ethics

Neetham (Tamil:நீதம்) are the primary virtues to be followed according to the Akilathirattu the holy text of Ayyavazhi. They are found in Akilam one, which is the first section of the Akilathirattu Ammanai, and in the middle of the meta-narrative events of the eight yugas. This shows that the society, its people, and the ruling king once lived in absolute harmony with nature, placing the power of God in all their works, deeds, and activities during early ages.

The Akilathirattu points this out as an example, and describes how the people should live in the world. It also forms a part of Ayyavazhi ethics. The Neethams are split into three. They are,

1. Manu Neetham: How an individual should personify him/herself with good morality.
2. Raja Neetham: How an individual should be to the society or Nation, and in turn how the Nation should be to a common man.
3. Deiva Neetham: How an individual should be before God.

== Manu Neetham — Justice of Common Man ==
The Manu Neetham describes how a person should act in a society. It also describes the correct moral character of the people, and their way of life in harmony with nature (particularly women) in the early ages.

Followers believe that all the events and actions that happen in their lives are activated by God. Therefore, they prefer not to seek any individual supremacy for any of their activities or achievements. All faithful followers believe that everyone is equal, in spite of the presence of different castes.

In addition, they do not find anyone inferior or superior to others with respect to the jobs they do. They neither do any menial jobs nor make others do so. In turn, they live with a mutual understanding of others not unlike the innocence of children.

=== Morality ===
- virginity is treated with highest respect, especially in women.
  - This not only means physical virginity, but a kind of mental "virginity" as well.
    - This is described as keeping one's mind clear, and not allowing the mind to become "instable" or "impure". In other words, virginity also means preserving moral and virginal thinking.
  - Because of this, Women do not speak often.
- Followers are to respect their father and mother, and keep them at equal status with God.
- Honesty is considered an important virtue.
- Women are taught to respect their husbands.
  - Wives sleep only after making their husbands sleep.
    - For example, women will wake up and bathe before dawn, pray, then clean the house as part of her daily routine.

Thus the people of the society would live: always striving to be role models for others. This ethical code is considered by followers to have been given by Ayyavazhi scriptures to mankind.

== Raja Neetham — Justice of Governance ==
This Raja Neetham or Arasa Neetham says, how an individual should be to the society or nation, and in turn how the nation should be to a common man. This was derived from the meta-narrative events, one practiced in the society.

The king ruled the country with great care, by giving more importance to individual needs. He respects each and every individual with equal status. The king consider the comfort of the subjects of the nation as the comfort of himself. In all the 1008 Pathis (The place where God is) the poojas were conducted rightly and in timely manner. The temples, the watermeans such as ponds, wells were supervised and were repaired frequently. Anna Dharmam, the charity on food is conducted frequently at choultries. The people of the nation always respect religious persons and pilgrims, and help them by all possible means, and consider that serving them (religious persons) is like serving God.

The king collects one-sixth of the means of people as tax. If any one says that they will not be able to give one-sixth of their means, the king don't use to compel them. If any one pays tax without any pending for about twelve years the King use to discount their tax for two years. The judgement from the king for the judicial cases of people will be accurate. He gives more importance for his people than for himself.

=== Right Judgement ===
This story tells about a king who follows the Raja Neetham rightly and so his accuracy in judgement.

Once a hunter choose a bird as his target and points his arrow towards it. The bird notes this and flies away and the hunter follows the bird. The bird flew and fell in front of the Chozha king and asked him to rescue from the hunter. Following this the hunter came in front of the king and demanded the bird. He also says, "whole of my today's time is wasted behind this bird. I and my family has to fulfill our hunger by this bird." On the other hand, the bird demanded the king to save it from the hunter.

The king feels that both of them are right from their own view point and sensed both the fulfillment of the hunger of hunter and saving the life of the bird is his duty as a king. So taking care the two subjects, the king cut an equal quantity of flesh to the bird from his limb and gave it to the hunter. So he saved the life of the bird and on the other hand saved the hunter's family from being hungry. As king, he treated both of his subjects equally and also fulfilled both of their needs.

Note: This story is not fully narrated as above in Akilam and only quoted.

== Deiva Neetham — Justice of Divinity ==
This Deiva Neetham tells about the thought of people about the Almighty and about their religious harmony during that (old) age, and tells the way by which one should be get divinized. The most important point is, this part says that when the other two Neethams are correctly followed the Deiva Neetham will be automatically fall in the right path. This concept was reveals from the mythical narration.

The reign of the king (above in Raja Neetham) was identified as a good rule by the Devas. Narayana, Brahma, Lekhsmi and all devas appreciated this rule. They went to kayilai to meet Siva to tell about this.

They met Siva in Kayilai and told that the King chozha is ruling his country genuinely. They also told Siva about the judgement of the king in the matter of the Hunter and the Bird. Also they brought to his attention, other merits of the reign of the king. They also demanded that, since the king is so genuine, talented and accurate in following the principles, he should order the devas to do the duties to his nation correctly. Hearing this Siva ordered the Mayon to order the devas to do all duties timidly. As per this Mayon ordered,

- Bhoomaadevi, goddess of earth to protect his nation.
- Varuna, the God of Rain to shed rain thrice a month in the country of that king.
- The clouds to act as an umbrella and protect his nation.
- Vayu, the God of Wind to fan his nation with gentle breeze.
- Sivayus to be alert on the places where the poojas are held in his nation.
- Nithira Devi, the Goddess of sleepiness not to disturb unnecessarily the subjects of his nation.

As per the order of Siva all activities were done by devas. Also they made all animals to live in harmony with each other and with the people. They also made the crops of his nation to give good yield for the people.

== See also ==
- Akilam one
- Arul Nool
- Akilathirattu Ammanai
