= Tamaraikulam =

Tamaraikulam is a village in Kanyakumari district, India near Kanyakumari. On the advent of Ayyavazhi and the Swamithoppepathi, the administrative unit was divided and part of it north to Swamithope is called North Tamaraikulam and south as South Tamaraikulam.

Thamaraiyur is the alternative name given for the village and the source for Ayyavazhi mythology.
