= Venneesan =

Venneesan was a mythical figure found in Ayyavazhi mythology sect of Hinduism. According to Akilathirattu Ammanai, the holy text of Ayyavazhi and source of Ayyavazhi mythology, he was the son of Kalineesan.

== Birth and marriage of Venneesan ==
While Kalineesan was performing tavam in order to gain a child, he was distracted by the scene of a cleric embracing a woman. Upon seeing this, the semen of Kalineesan came out and fell into the water. A white crane came and swallowed the semen, became pregnant, and delivered a baby boy in the water. A sage, Punal Rhishi, took the baby, which was white in appearance, and looked after it. He named it Asubakkiri and also taught him the technique of swimming and shipping. He also taught him the art of diving in the sea and searching for pearls. He also taught him the technique of finding Gold and silver rushes. He in addition taught him various stratagems.

By teaching him all these things, he married him to two girls of the Chenkomatti country and made him the king of the Chenkomatti land.

== The quality of Venneesan ==
By the techniques he learned from the sage he earned a large amount of gold and silver and piled them as mountains. His economic possession was the greatest in the world. As his economic growth was extraordinary, he formed various armed forces. He formed a huge army, which included horse, elephant and camel forces. He also provided a huge number of dreadful weapons. Due to his growth in power, he said "there is nobody in the world to oppose me".

He created a veda (scripture) of his own. He changed the agamas and made them to say that there are 27 stars (astrology). He made a calendar with 12 months in a year. He made changes to the agamas which were earlier intended by the kaliyan. He added and removed some parts from the previous. He changed the ultimate mantra Ari-namo and replaced it with the mantra Veeriyaayan-aathi. To make the people accept his Veda (scripture), he supplied them with money. By this he succeeded in converting the people. His dynasty became very large and so did his armies, weapons and military strength.

== Superiority ==
Due to his abnormal economic and military growth, he called out "is there any one to oppose me here in this world"? On hearing this, a man in his country told him that there were 56 nations which were once ruled by three powerful kings known as Cheras, Cholas and Pandyas. While they were ruling the land a male child was born to a nurse of women. He grew up as a powerful boy. Meanwhile, due to a curse from some girls of Deiva Loga, the three kings lost their kingdom and their relatives died (including all their children and wives). They went into the sea and sat there as stones. From then the whole land was controlled with an iron fist, ruled by the boy of the nurse. He was able to control the whole land by his magical power. And now it was time to wage a war against him and defeat him.

== Defeat of Venneesan ==
Following this direction, for the first time the Venneesan led a war against Kalineesan. Lord Narayana who was dwelling in Thiruvananthapuram sensed this and informed Kalineesan. At once he formed a great army and defeated Venneesan by the grace and mercy of Thirumal.

== See also ==
- Ayyavazhi mythology
- Kalineesan
- Thirumal in Thiruvananthapuram
