= Kalimayai =

In Akilattirattu Ammanai, the source of Ayyavazhi mythology, Kalimayai is the illusion caused by the evil spirit of Kali Yukam. It is believed to be a fragment of the evil Kroni.

== See also ==
- List of Ayyavazhi-related articles
