= Seedars =

According to Akilattirattu Ammanai, the scripture of the Ayyavazhi religion, Ayya Vaikundar, the Incarnation of Lord Narayana in Kali Yukam, has five Seedar (disciples). They were in the previous Dwapara Yukam as Pandavas who were transmigrated as disciples of Vaikundar in this Yuga.

== The Five Seedar ==
=== Dharma Seedar ===
The native place of Dharma Seedar is Mayiladi, a town in Kanyakumari district of Tamil Nadu. He was Dharmar, the elder of the Pandavas in the previous Dwapara Yukam. In history he was known as Sivanandi.

=== Bhiman Seedar ===
The native place of Bhiman Citar is Karumbattoor, a village in the district of Kanyakumari. He was Bhima, the most courageous of the Pandavas in the previous Dwapara Yukam. In history he was known as Pantaram (his name).

=== Arjunan Seedar ===
The native place of Arjunan Seedar is Pillayar Kudiyiruppu, a village in the district of Kanyakumari. He was Arjuna, one among Pandavas in the previous Dwapara Yukam. In history he was known as Arjunan.

=== Nakulan Seedar ===
The native place of Nakulan Seedar is Colachel, a town in the district of Kanyakumari. Among the Pandavas in the previous Dwapara Yukam he was Nakula. In history he was known as Subaiah.

=== Sakatevan Seedar ===
Hari Gopalan Citar, also known as Sakatevan Citar, is considered to be the most important among the Seedars because he was the man to write Akilattirattu Ammanai (Akilam), the holy scripture of Ayyavazhi. In the Adiyeduttharulal part in Akilam One of Akilattirattu he claims that it was not he, but God who wrote the contents of Akilam.

Akilam says that he was Sakadeva, one among the Panchapandavas and he was made to be born in Kali Yukam in a village south to Swamithoppe. He was known as Sakadevan in human history. There are also some reports claiming that Hari Gopalan Citar was illiterate and he did not know even the alphabets of Tamil before he wrote Akilam.

== See also ==
- List of Ayyavazhi-related articles
- Payyan dynasty
- Timeline of Ayyavazhi history
