= Sampooranathevan =

Sampooranathevan is a mythical figure in Ayyavazhi mythology. He was considered a powerful deva of Deiva Loga.

== See also ==
- Akilathirattu Ammanai
