= Kalineesan =

Kalineesan is someone who was caught by Kalimayai (not to be confused with the Hindu deity) according to Akilattirattu Ammanai, the source of Ayyavazhi mythology. Kaliyan is the sixth fragment of Kroni and Kalineesan. According to Ayyavazhi mythology, the kalimayai captured the King of Travancore and henceforth was called Kalineesan.

== See also ==
- Kaliyukam
- List of Ayyavazhi-related articles
