= Ayyavazhi mythology =

Indian story from Akilathirattu Ammanai,

Ayyavazhi mythology is the mythology of the South Indian religious faith known as Ayyavazhi, which is officially considered a Hindu sect. The main source of Ayyavazhi mythology is the Ayyavazhi scripture, Akilathirattu Ammanai, and its supplement, Arul Nool. The Akilathirattu Ammanai is a recitation by Mayon (the Tamil name for Vishnu, or Lord Narayana) to his consort Lakshmi. It is divided into three sections: Early Avatars, incarnational events and post-incarnational events.

== Early Avatars ==
The early avatars are all those that occurred prior to the earthly incarnation of Mayon.

=== The first six Yugas ===
The first Yuga ("aeon" or "era") was called Neetiya Yuga. During this time, divine, human and all other virtues flourished without hindrance. They did not fear demons, and there was perfect harmony among the creatures of the Universe, as well as among those who lived in the Fourteen Worlds. In this yuga, the king was righteous and did not oppress his people through taxes or other means.

During this peaceful time, Kroni was born. Kroni, who is analogous to Satan in the Christian tradition, is a primordial personification of evil. Though Kroni is said to have been born with multitudinous limbs, each the size of a mountain, he nevertheless assumes different forms in different yugas: as Ravana or Duryodhana, for example. Likewise, Mayon also incarnates in different yugas as different Avatars: for example Rama or Krishna.

In order to quell the ravenous hunger in his stomach, Kroni drank all of the waters of the sea. With these waters being insufficient, he swallowed Kailayam, the abode of Sivan (the Tamil name for Shiva), and then proceeded to devour the entire universe. Akilam one: 440-446. (text available at Wikisource)

Mayon, residing with Sivan in Kailayam, escaped to undertake tavam (tapas, meaning "austerity") and to receive permission from Sivan to destroy Kroni. Isvaran granted this permission, but made Mayon aware of the necessity to appear in different forms in the successive six yukams in order to destroy the Six Fragments of Kroni. Following this advice, Mayon sliced Kroni into six fragments and saved the universe. The first yuga thus came to an end.

In the second yuga, called Chathura Yuga, one of the six pieces of Kroni was formed into a creature named Kuntomasali. It had the shape and size of a mammoth leech, and when it disturbed the tavam of those in Tava lokam (the land of austerity), Mayon destroyed the leech by catching it with a hook.

In the third yuga, called Netu Yuga, another fragment of Kroni created two wicked individuals called Thillaimallalan and Mallosivahanan. They ruled over the people by extracting Uliyam and Iraikal (taxes) from them. When this exploitation became unbearable, the Devas (celestial beings) complained to Sivan, who, in turn, commissioned Mayon to carry out the destruction of the wicked rulers, which he did.

The fourth yuga was called Kretha Yuga. The third fragment of Kroni was, again, made into two siblings, called Suraparppan and Sinhamuka Asuran, and they were given responsibility to rule the Earth. The wicked rulers began to crush the Devas, who reported it to Mayon. Mayon took the form of Arumugan, the Tamil name for Kartikeya, and advised the rulers to desist from their wickedness. However, when they arrogantly spurned his advice, Arumugan eliminated them. During the same Yuga, Suraparppan was created, this time as Iraniyan. Mayon, incarnated as the son of Iraniyan (Prahlada), challenged his authority and finally took on the therianthropic form of man and lion (Narasimha) by piercing his stomach. On his deathbed, Mayon asked him to repent, but he replied arrogantly: "You cannot kill me. Only by placing ten mountains as ten nails might you kill me. Otherwise you can't."

In the ensuing yuga, called Thretha Yuga, Sivan, as per the request of Mayon, created the fourth piece of the primordial Kroni as a ten-headed mighty warrior, with the ten mountains as ten heads, naming him as Ravanan. He oppressed all those living on Earth by extracting Uliyam from them. He subdued all the earthly kings and made them pay tributes to him. Suffering under his oppression, the Devas sought the help of Mayon who, for the purpose of destroying him, took birth as Raman. On his death-bed, he repented, saying: "Only with the help of my brother were you able to destroy me." With this episode of killing Ravanan, Thretha Yuga came to an end.

In the sixth yuga, called Dwapara Yuga, the fifth fragment of Kroni was portioned into a hundred pieces, and made into Duriyodhanan and ninety-nine brothers to support him. The three brothers of Raman, along with Vibushanan and Sampoovan of the preceding epoch, were created as Pancha Pandavas in this aeon. The wicked Duriyodhanan was killed by the Pancha Pandavas, with the support of Mayon, who came in the form of Krishna. Even at the brink of death, Duriyodhanan refused to repent, saying that "only with your cunning mind were you able to defeat me, and otherwise not." Mayon then told him: "You will be created with knowledge, intelligence, and artistic skill in the next Yukam, and if you do not repent in that age, that will be your eternal annihilation." Having said this, Mayon went to Srirangam and dwelt there.

=== The Santror ===
Towards the end of Dvapara Yuga, Thirumal (Mayon), with the aid of Seven Virgins (Saptha Kanniyar), had begotten seven sons, known as the Santror Makkal (see Santror Pirappu), in order to accomplish the task of destroying the Kalineesan and Kali mayai (Kali Yuga Maya) that were to be countered in the following Kali Yuga.

After the birth of Santror, they were all named by conducting a naming ceremony (see The Naming ceremony of Santror) and fed with celestial nectar (see Feeding the children with Celestial Nectar). The Santror were raised by Bhadrakali and married to the daughters of Nirupathirajan (see Fostered by the acclaimed Deity Patrakali).

=== Kalineesan, Kali Yuga, and Kalimayai ===
The sixth fragment of the primordial Kroni was Neesan, the epitome of wickedness ((Tamil neesa meaning "wickedness"). Neesan was created in the form of a male human being who was wise, beautiful and intelligent. Neesan pushed himself out of the earth in an inverted form. Upon seeing his appearance, the celestial diviners predicted that he, being without normal human parentage, would have an undefined and rude physique, and that his intelligence and five senses would be rooted in falsehood. They further predicted that he would have a life as fragile as that of a bird, but he would unleash wickedness on people with arrogance.

Having obtained innumerable boons (see Boons), including the Chakra of Mayon and invincibility, Neesan proceeded to earth to rule over the people. On his way, he was accosted by Thirumal, who appeared as a Pantaram (an itinerant mendicant), with long flowing unkempt hair and torn clothes. Thirumal challenged him to a duel which Neesan refused, considering it beneath his dignity to fight with a Pantaram coming in such an attire without any weapon. Taking the opportune moment, Thirumal shrewdly made Neesan promise to forfeit all his boons if any of his lies caused trouble to any Pantaram on earth in the future. Then, he bought the Chakra from Kaliyan and cursed it as money. The money asked Thirumal when this curse would leave it, to which Thirumal replied: "It will leave you when Kali is defeated".

The Neesan was thenceforth called Kalineesan because the Kali Yuga had dawned along with his birth. Along with him was born an evil force called Kali Mayai (Kali Yuga Maya). The Kali here refers to the evil spirit behind Kali Yuga and not Kali, the Hindu deity).

Kali Maya engulfed the whole world and consequently, deceit and illusion began to contaminate the minds of the people. Age-old traditions and conventions, based on Dharmam, were unduly overthrown. Kalineesan introduced the discrimination of caste among the people. The powerless people were crushed with brute might. People, caught in the Kalimayai, began to be inimical towards one another - men against women, children against parents, and so forth. People used demonic force to harm one another. Kalimayai captured the king of Thiruvitankur and began to rule over the people as their king.

=== Thirumal in Thiruvananthapuram ===
Thirumal, dwelling at Sri Rangam hitherto, found it unworthy of his abode because of the misdeeds of the priests there. He shifted his tent to Thiruvananthapuram. When he reached there, a Pulayar woman saw him and spread the news to one and all. Hearing of this, Kalineesan constructed a temple of fine granite at the site where the Pulayar woman spotted Tirumal, and decorated the temple with gold and pearls. The king instituted scores of rituals and ceremonies at the temple to be performed by Namboothiri Brahmins. The lights of the temple were, however, lit daily from a torch brought from the home of the Pulayar woman.

==== Venneesan ====
Kalineesan had no children, so he went on a pilgrimage to Kasi, a holy place, and stood in tavam (spiritual suffering) for a son. While performing the tavam, he was distracted by the scene of a cleric embracing a woman. Because of this, Kalineesan's semen came out and fell into the water. A white crane came and swallowed the semen, became pregnant, and delivered a baby boy in the water. A sage, Punal Rhishi, took the baby, which was white in appearance, and looked after it.

Kalineesan, his tavam being defective, returned to his country in despair, resigned to a prediction that even if he were to have a son, it would be only the sons of his sister who would rule the country.

The baby, delivered by the white crane, grew up and came of age, and was married in the land of Chenkomatti. He prospered there with his progeny, who later emerged as a powerful people by learning the skills of ship-travel, trading in gold and silver, and diplomacy. This people, called Venneesa kulam, propagated a religion of their own, and through the lure of money gained many new members. Venneesan (the name comes from two words, venmai meaning "white," and neesan, meaning "wicked person") introduced a new calendar.

==== Santror in Kali Yuga ====
Kalineesan, coming to know about the valour and loyalty of the Santror people, appointed them as his bodyguards. It so happened that one day, while guarding the entrance of the king’s room, the body-guards happened to fall asleep, during which time, the enemies of the king, hailing from the king’s own race, entered the room and assassinated the king. The Kalineesan, while succumbing to the murderous attack, mistaking it to be a betrayal by the body-guards, cursed them that they and their progeny would be oppressed with oozhiyam (coolie service) and regressive taxation as long as the king’s dynasty ruled the country.

The curse of the king began to take effect on the Santror. The Kalineesan, the successor of the previous king, imposed innumerable taxes on every article used by the Santror for their day to day living. Their occupational implements, the palmyra trees that supported them, and every item of the produce of these trees were punitively taxed. The produce of the palmyra trees was to be given to the high castes, failing which the Santror were tortured with corporal punishments. There were many arbitrary taxes imposed on them. The Santror found no favour with the rules, in spite of paying these cruel taxes.

==== Thirumal deserting Kalineesan ====
Having witnessed the woes of the Santror, Mayon admonished the king to desist from oppressing them. He reminded the king that it was his seventh birth, coming in the lineage of the primordial Kroni, and if he failed to repent during this opportunity, then it would be his eternal damnation. He exhorted him to revoke the cruel taxes and the exploitative system of uliyam, imposed on the Santror, the people born of Mayon's seeds.

The king retorted, saying:

"How dare you advise me to revoke the taxes and the oozhiyam imposed on the low caste Chanar? If I do so, how else do I earn gold coins - a hundred of them needed to perform puja for you every morning and evening, a thousand of them needed to take care of all the temples and me, and a ten thousand of them needed to pay my staff? Do I not get these gold coins by squeezing the labour of these Chanar? Even if you desert me and go to one of the Chanar places, I will never revoke the taxes and oozhiyam imposed on them."

Responding to the king, Mayon said:

"Did I ever ask you to offer me puja by exploiting the people? You offer puja not to me, but to the Namboothiri Brahmins. The whole world knows that the only thing that I receive whole-heartedly is the light brought by the Pulayar woman."

Peeved at the response of Mayon, the king mockingly said: "If you have not tasted any of my offerings, what then have you to do with me? Go wherever you want to..." Listening to the impenitent and brute words of the king, divine rage overcame Mayon and he said: "You have mocked at me and ill-treated me as you do to the Chanar. Lo, I am going away from your place to Thiruchendur. I will take on you in another form. Then, I will perform a Dharmam that you and the world will acknowledge as the greatest. I will destroy the pervasive demonic cult and crown the Chanar".

Having said these things, Mayon deserted Thiruvananthapuram. He told the people: "Henceforth, let all castes united as one people, come to the place where I am going to dwell". Having said this, he proceeded to Thiruchendur. It happened then that the fortress of the Kalineesan crashed into pieces. The earth was covered with darkness of slumber, the sea engulfed the land, and all the palatial buildings of the king were effaced. Seeing these calamities, the Brahmins lamented and the priests wailed.

Mayon took his abode at the seashore of Thiruchendur. During this time, the venneesan had spread his wicked rule over the country, trampling upon the traditions of the land. He flouted the principles of Dharma, observed by the Santror and failed to give the dignity due to them.

== Incarnational events ==
Incarnational events include preparations for incarnation, the event of incarnation, and the proclamations and instructions given to the newly incarnated god. Since Mayon's incarnation, as Lord Vaikundar, is the foremost power, this is considered to be the most important part in Akilathirattu Ammanai. Below is an elaboration of these events.

=== Preparing for incarnation ===
Seeing the degraded status of the Santror, the celestial gods made a plea to Mayon as follows: "Our young brothers, the Santror, are suffering endlessly under the yoke of the centuries old oozhiyam and have lost dignity and respect on account of that. Have you not seen their iniquities?"

After listening to the plea, Mayon prepared for the incarnation. He made all the celestial gods take birth in the world in order to assist in destroying the kali. He set out to create new cattle, reptiles, birds, plants, trees, and all other elements of nature that would befit the new age of Dharma Yukam because the Dharma Yukam was to be characterised by a new life, new people, and new thinking. In that new age Shastras, Vedas and all the religions would be the same; the Tamil language would permeate the world; people would live united as a single humanity; the people of Mayon would live with pristine glory and they would flourish with all prosperity; the earth would yield abundantly; diseases, calamities and the impact of the evil magical practices would not affect the people; the old Shastras would be turned untrue, and instead, a new code would be enshrined.

=== Mayon — on the identity of his people ===
Mayon then enunciated the attributes of his children who would be his collaborators in the world. He said:

"The identity of my people is that they do not offer puja or sacrifices, do not have temples and priests, do not have offerings of flowers, do not offer blood sacrifices of goat, bull and roosters, and do not worship cows and images made of clay. Instead, they are those who do Dharmam to all those who come in my name."

=== Final admonition through Thiruvasakam ===
Before the incarnation of Mayon could take place, the three godheads decided to send a final admonition with the name of Thiruvasakam to Kalineesan that he might amend. (see : Thiruvasakam (Ayyavazhi))

=== Deciding to incarnate as Vaikundar ===
Kalineesan did not pay heed to the Thiruvasakam. Mayon then decided to incarnate as Vaikundar and, to that effect, walked towards the seashore of Thiruchendur.

When the day came, Lord Narayana then instantly went into the sea, amidst the chanting of the celestial gods. Inside the sea, enveloping himself in a scorching flame, he approached Lakshmi who was awaiting his arrival in the form of a Lotus pedestal. Afraid of the ball of flame approaching her, Lakshmi worshipped it with reverence. Mayon revealed himself and took Lakshmi and told her of his intention to create a son. By that time, Mayon had come into the sea. Then, Lord Narayana himself incarnated as Vaikundar during an encounter with a deity Goddess Lakshmi, he was beget inside the sea and arose from the sea of Tiruchendur on Kollam Year 1008 at 20th day of Tamil Month Masi (1 March 1833 CE, Friday).

I (Hari Gopalan) am writing these words of Akilattirattu Ammanai with the grace of God!

" ‘O’ Lord you took avatar for Pandavas and eliminated their enemies.

You attained the abode of Kailasa with anger due to birth of Kaliyan.

Came again to the world to protect santror (good people) and dharma"

"On Masi 1008, I (Lord Narayana) myself appeared as Pantaram on the banks of sea, have taken residence in Theksanapuri as Vaikundar" – Akilattirattu

Akilattirattu says, Lord Narayana himself incarnated as Vaikundar and appeared as Pantaram on the banks of sea. This place became a holy place for the devotees of Ayya vazhi and they erected a temple there named Avathara pathi.

God says this prophecy,

"I (Lord Narayana) took the avatar for yuga trail and became the praise child for Sita.

As a king of Dharma yuga, I am going to rule the world with single command" – Akilattirattu

He then imparted certain arcane knowledge in the form of proclamations and instructions, known as Vinchai, to his newly niall son, Vaikundar. (see: Vinchai to Vaikundar)

Having given these exhortations, Mayon called his son intimately as Narayana Vaikundar and told him that if these teachings were observed strictly, the illusory force of kali would be contained and when people learned to live with self-respect, Kali would destroy itself.

Then the whole array of celestial gods sang lullabies (See:Thalattu, Palli Unarthal, Abayam.), praising the special attributes of the newly born child, Vaikundar. They praised him for having been born as the child of Mayon, in the race of Chanar, in order to teach the virtue of Dharmam to the world and to incinerate Kali.

Lord Vaikundar, having received all the instructions from his father, walked out of the sea to go into the world. Mayon sent two celestial sages (Kalai Muni and Gnana Muni) with him as witnesses to his activities. Vaikundar took the human form as Pantaram at Tharuvaiyur near seashore. From the point of incarnation of Vaikundar, it is said that he will destroy Kaliyan and the evil in Kali Yuga. It is also said that he will take all righteous people along with him in the succeeding eighth yuga called as Dharma yuga.

== Post-incarnational events ==
The various episodes, that are portrayed to be occurring after the event of incarnation, are called here as post-incarnational events. Given below is an elaboration of them.

=== Vaikundar's emergence out of the sea ===
Vaikundar crossed over to the land from the sea and showing a human appearance as Narayana Pantaram to the mother of Muthukutty (alias Sampoornadevan), told her: "Woman, you had been Muthukutty mother before the year 1008 (AD 1833). I (Narayana) have been born as Vaikundar, the child of Mayon. I have received powers for redeeming the Santror. I am going to destroy the evilmongers and rule the world under a single command." Having said this, Vaikundar set out towards Detchanam (Dakshin, the south).

=== Vaikundar's journey to Detchanam ===
Vaikundar walked towards Detchanam, along the sea route. All along his path, the creatures of the sea and the animals of the forest greeted him, expressing their happiness, for they were to be freed from the clutches of Kali. Vaikundar, announcing the glad tidings to everyone, traversed the path towards Manavaippathi (Puvantantoppu) in Detchanam. The itinerant Vaikundar, reaching the temple of Pakavathi at Kanyakumari, told her that he, the Narayana Vaikundar, had come to uplift the lowly by ruling the world under the banner of Dharmam and therefore, she was to rescind from accepting any sacrifices or offerings.

=== Tavam ===
Making himself known to the people as Vaikundar, the great Narayana took his abode under a tree at the entrance of Manavaippathi.

=== Burning of the demons ===
When a year and a half had passed after undertaking the Tavam, people complained to Vaikundar of the disturbances caused by the demons in the world. Vaikundar, intending to put an end to the misdeeds of the demons, thought of incinerating them totally. He then summoned a celestial sage and sought his counsel on this matter. The sage, after going through the Akamankal (Agamas), told Vaikundar:

From the moment Narayana became Vaikundar and came to the world, the demons, the evil spirits and all other deceptions of the world are disappearing; Kali Yukam is being destroyed, together with the old Vedas. Puranas and Agamas have lost their substance. As of now, Vaikundar is establishing a Dharma Yukam that he will rule eternally. So, now is the right time to destroy all that are to be destroyed.

Vaikundar then assembled all the demons in one place. He made some persons in the gathering, who were accustomed to ‘possession’, to get ‘possessed’ of the demons in the presence of the people. The demons that had ‘come on to these persons’ began to tremble with fear and, by making loud cries, bemoaned their end. Resigned to their fate, they requested Vaikundar to tell them the modalities to surrender. When the demons asked it themselves, Vaikundar ordered them to make an oath in front of the people that they had surrendered all their powers. Accordingly, the demons made a public oath that they had surrendered all their powers. Then they fled to the mountain and killed themselves by falling into fire. As this happened, those that were dancing due to the ‘possession’ of the demons got exhausted and fell flat on the grounds. As the crowd was witnessing all these happenings, a few shepherds, tending their flock in the mountain, came rushing and reported that they heard the loud cries of the demons as they were falling in the fire. When the crowd heard these, they appreciated the way the demons were destroyed and acknowledged that Vaikundar was really the Narayanar needed for the country.

=== Seizing the power of magic, witchcraft, sorcery, trickery, etc. ===
Having destroyed the demons, Vaikundar thought of incarcerating the powers of Malaiyarasar, the people of the mountain who performed black magic, witchcraft, sorcery, etc., with the aid of evil spirits. No sooner had he thought of it than the wild animals, being released from the clutches of the Malaiyaracar, went berserk and attacked the people ferociously. Horrified at the behaviour of the animals, the Malaiyaracar resorted to their usual black magic to contain the animals. But, alas, this time, their magic did not work. Disappointed and worried, they became panicky and sought the help of a Kuratti, the village astrologer, to make them known the cause of these events.

Kuratti, hearing their woes, told them that Vaikundar had incarnated to eradicate the sufferings of all and therefore, they would do well to meet him to get rid of their woes. Coming to know of Vaikundar, the Malaiyaracar came to him immediately and pleaded with him to solve their problems. Vaikundar told them it was time for the destruction of all the evil forces and therefore, they would do well to surrender the knowledge of black magic, witchcraft, sorcery, and trickery, the spells used to bind others, and all types of esoteric charms in their possession. If refused to comply, they were warned of severe consequences. Hearing the admonition from Vaikundar, and fearing the consequences of the refusal to surrender, they agreed to hand over all their powers to him. Since they had not brought with them the manuscript documents that contained the spells, they vowed in front of Vaikundar and the people that they would never again resort to these practices. When they did so, Vaikundar advised and blessed them to take to cultivation as an alternative profession. When this was done, the celestial Gods wrote it in the heavenly records that Vaikundar had done away with the evil forces and had made Dharmam to prosper in the world.

=== Exhortations ===
Having incinerated the demons and seized the powers of the Malaiyaracar, Vaikundar exhorted the people as follows:

"From this day on, repose your faith only in Vaikundar, and fear not any other powers. Do not give offerings to temples, do not cast away your hard-earned money into dump-boxes, and keep your wealth to yourself."

Listening to these exhortations, people of all castes realised that kalimayai was being destroyed and Dharmam was established. Vaikundar brought Dharmam also to the flora and fauna, exhorting them not to hurt or kill each other, and not to crush the weak, but to live in harmony as one family.

People came as one family and listened to the exhortations of Dharmam given by Vaikundar. They accepted him in their hearts as the undisputed God and lived happily.

=== Vaikundar's trial ===
At this time round, the king of Thiruvithankur, the Kalineesan came to Suchindrum for his routine visit. He was an agitated man. With his powers already been curtailed by the foreigners, he wanted to know whether there was any one else in his kingdom that could challenge his authority. The ministers told him as follows:

"From the race of the Chanar who perform the menial uliyam for us, someone, claiming to be the incarnation of Vishnu, is making pronouncements that he is going to rule the land under his one undisputed command. He has gathered people of all castes into one place around him. He has also claimed that he would destroy all his enemies and establish a rule of Dharmam. It looks the Chanar people are having a great day".

Listening to this, the king grew weary. He summoned a seer to know whether the news was true. The seer confirmed it, saying it was time the great Vishnu incarnated as Vaikundar. The king retorted to the seer saying:

""Even if the great Vishnu wanted to incarnate, would he, leaving aside the honourable Namboothiri and other Brahmin caste, come into this untouchable Chanar people? It looks to be a cheating".

Listening to the king, an elderly person from a shepherd caste, who was in the assembly, advised the king saying:

""If Vishnu wants, he will take birth in any race and in any form. He may come as a Panan or a Pariyan. So better not to disturb this person".

The king was infuriated and was not ready to listen to anyone's counsel. He ordered one of the chiefs of the army to bring Vaikuntar to him. Accordingly, a squad of soldiers came and surrounded Vaikundar who was sitting on a cot, performing his tavam. As the troops prepared to seize him, the Santror, standing near Vaikundar, got enraged and readied to attack the troops. Sensing trouble, Vaikundar prevented the Santror saying:

"My children, it is those who contain the instant rage that will become great. You are people of love. Keep restraint, I will make you rule the earth".

The army personnel, then, took hold of Vaikundar, tied him with a rope, and tortured him ruthlessly. They questioned him with spite:

""Whether he became a deity for the Chanars? Whether he disguised himself as a deity in order to amass wealth?"

He was then led along the streets to the king. The wicked people threw stones at him, pulled his long hair and teased him, calling him demoniac. Some people from the low castes accused him of bringing disgrace to their race. Vaikundar did not utter a word in response. He reached Suchindram and was brought in front of the king.

The king wanted to test Vaikundar's powers. He hid a ring in the palm of his hand and asked him to name it. Vaikundar, being aware of the fact that showing his powers would not aid his mission in any way but that it would only precipitate matters unduly, remained reticent. The king, being hurt by his silence, ordered him to be tortured more. Five kinds of poison were mixed in an arrack and given to him to drink. Vaikundar drank it as if he were drinking milk and remained unaffected. Seeing that the poison had not worked, Vaikundar was confined in a stinking prison, infested with worms and leeches. Vaikundar took upon himself all these sufferings for the sake of his poor Chanar.

Then Vaikundar was led through Kottar, Chunkankadai, Thuckalay, Padmanabhapuram, Balaramapuram, and brought to Thiruvananthapuram where he was detained in an open prison. While in the prison, many people came and worshipped him.

The Kalineesan did not relent from torturing Vaikundar. He ordered him to be thrown to a starving tiger. In that, Ayya Vaikundar proves to the world, his Power (see Katuvai Sothanai).

After that event, a person known as Poovandar went up to the king, and testifying to the genuineness of Vaikundar, pleaded for his release. The king, considering the request, wanted Vaikundar to sign a document as a condition for the release. The condition was that he would not any more gather the different castes, except his own, into one place. Vaikundar tore the piece of material that contained the condition into pieces and threw it on to the ground. However, the king did not wish to retain him in the prison anymore.

Vaikundar chose the nineteenth of the Tamil month Masi (February/March) to be the day of his release. His devotees, the Santror, carried him on a cradle through Balaramapuram, Parvathipuram, Kottar, Suchindram and reached back to Thamaraippathi.

=== Thuvayal Thavasu ===
Back in Tamaraipathi, Vaikundar continued according to the instructions of his Father. He instructed the people to undertake a tavam called thuvayal thavam (thuvay means to wash) which was also called Thuvayal Thavasu, an act of ritual washing of one's physique and clothes along with practice of self-abnegation and self-restraint.

=== Marriage with the Seven Virgins ===
Even as Vaikundar was continuing to instruct and serve the people, he intended to marry the seven virgins. He made some people of Chanar, young and old, male and female, get into a trance and dance. He made some of them narrate the accounts of the world, and of the story of the seven virgins carrying the seeds of Mayon and delivering the seven sons of the Chanar.

Vaikundar then, putting on the appearance of Narayana, made the Santror, who stood around him, to walk in the four directions and call out to their mothers, the Seven Virgins. The seven divine mothers, listening to the call of their sons, came out and paid respect to Vaikundar who had come to marry them and give them back their children as it was promised to them in their previous birth.

Once the divine mothers came, after confirming their desire to get married and to get back their children, Vaikundar announced to the world the news of the marriage of the Seven Virgins with Vaikundar. Vaikundar then asked the Santror what they would give as gift to the bridegroom. (see: Thirukkalyana Ekanai).

The Santror, the kith and kin of the brides, answered that all their wealth, even their very lives could be given as gift to him. Vaikundar then requested the Santror to take and give the hands of the seven virgins to him in marriage. When they did it ceremoniously, Vaikundar placed a glittering golden chain around the necks of the seven divine women.

The celestial saints then praised the special attributes of the marriage partners, and the race in which they hailed from. Then, singing the praises of Narayana and praying that he might fulfil his mission of ushering in the Dharma Yukam, the brides and the bridegroom circumambulated the ‘Pathi’ in their ceremonial attire. The supplications of the brides were that Vaikundar should destroy the evil age, usher in the age of Dharma, and make his people rule the Dharma Yukam .

When the marriage had taken place as per the earlier promise, the Santror realised that all the curses incurred by them had been erased and there was no curse anymore on their race. People came from all directions to pay homage to Vaikundar and presented him with various gifts.

=== Festivals and celebrations ===
Vaikundar thought of organising festivals and celebrations with the people who garnered around him. He fixed Sunday, the day of his birth in the sea, to be the day in every week for celebrations. People gathered there on every Sunday, bringing him gifts. They decorated the vicinity with flowers and festoons. Amidst crackers of fireworks and music of joy, the seven virgins, dressing themselves in saffron and sporting the Namam (sacred symbol on the forehead), came in grand procession on the streets alone with Vaikundar. Ayya Vaikundar, as a Pantaram, had donned himself in squalid rags, smeared the white mark on the body, tied a turf on his hair, and carried a cane. Besides his disciples, a large number of Santror came in procession along with him. Those who had participated in the thuvayal thavam also accompanied him by chanting the prayer, "Siva Siva" Those men and women, that were ‘taken hold of by divine power’, sang the praises of Narayaya and accompanied the procession.

During the procession, Vaikundar was carried in a golden cradle. A conch shell was blown, womenfolk made kuravai, and the celestial gods were showering flowers from above. People held these festivals in high esteem.

=== Vaikundar as the Reigning King ===
Vaikundar, being instructed through a dream that occurred to one of his followers, came to Moolakuntappati (Ambalappathi) with his kith and kin. Here he enthroned himself like a reigning king on a grand seat in a mansion built with pearls, designed with a pedestal for conducting the Ukattheerppu (the judgment). He vested himself in white silk, wore a golden cap on the head, and arbitrated for the people. People celebrated his presence there.

=== Marriage with the Deities ===
Vaikundar then decided to marry deities such as Pakavathi (Bhagavati), Valli, Theivanai, Mantaikattal, Lakshmi, Parvathi and Poomadanthai. He took on different forms and told the deities that they were to be united with him in order to destroy Kali Yukam and establish the Dharma Yukam. Then, compelling each deity to seduce a woman in the gathering, he married them in a grand manner.

Vaikundar, having married these deities, continued his activities among his people. People flocked to him in large numbers. They were pleased to invite him to their houses. They took him in chariots, arranged grand feasts in his honour, and presented him with very valuable gifts. Vaikundar laid the foundation for Nizhal Thangals in some villages that he visited.

=== Ascending to Vaikundam, the abode of Thirumal ===
Having accomplished whatever he intended doing, Vaikundar thought of attaining Vaikundam, i.e., leaving this world and going to the world of Vaikundam. He prayed to Thirumal to take him back as he had accomplished his mission. Thirumal, too, had thought of calling his son back, and so he commanded his sages to decorate the house for his son in Vaikundam.

Vaikundar then began contemplating on Vaikundam alone. As he was preparing, he instructed his Santror not to be afraid, and to live united in love. He gave them a white mark on their forehead. Then he began his journey to Vaikundam on 1126, Itabam 21, at noon. As he reached Vaikundam, Thirumal and Isvaran received him warmly. The Devas praised him for his singular, unsurpassable achievement of the tavam that he had undertaken for the sake of destroying the Kali.

When he was received in the celestial abode, his women and children on earth interred his golden body, erected a temple and conducted celebrations regularly.

=== Dharma Yukam [The final victory] ===
In Vaikundam, Thirumal asked his son whether he had fulfilled, without any flaw, all that had been told to him earlier. Vaikundar, in response, told him about the six-year tavam and other activities. The sages who had been sent to accompany him vouched for the flawlessness of the tavam he undertook.

Being satisfied at the performance of Vaikundar, Thirumal and Isvaran crowned him gloriously, gave him a sceptre and other divine paraphernalia, and seated him on the throne. While on the throne in Vaikundam, he was worshipped by his people on earth. All those who stood by him and served him when he undertook the tavam were granted happiness on earth, besides the assurance of a life with him in Vaikundam. Those Neesakulam that opposed and tortured him were condemned to hell.

Once Vaikundar was crowned as the king, everything belonging to Dharma Yukam appeared as per the wish of Vaikundar. People worthy of Dharma Yukam, including his children and women, appeared instantly. A whole lot of new creatures, animals, plants and trees appeared. A new earth, new moon, new sky, new wind, etc. emerged. The wicked people disappeared and the people, worthy of Dharma Yukam, appeared. All those living beings, that had been ordered to come up at the coronation of Vaikundar, awoke to the new age. All those unworthy of Dharma Yukam were engulfed by the sea.

Then, Thirumal brought up the life of Kroni for judgment.

Thirumal interrogated him as follows:

"I had come as a Pantaram in the kaliyukam and had burned the demons, healed the people with water, solicited Dharmam, prevented offerings, and gathered the people in one place and taught them. You caught me and tortured me cruelly due to your wickedness. You did these things, contrary to your own promise given me earlier that you wouldn’t torture any Pantaram. You have violated your promise, and therefore, you yourself have brought ruins upon you. Have you any response to this?"

Kalineesan, then, without having anything to say, surrendered all his powers and boons. The force of illusion took hold of him and put him into the flames of the abyss where the devils resided. All the evil forces of the kalimayai were also destroyed likewise. And then, Vaikundar blew a conch shell to announce his victory.

Hearing the sound of the conch-shell, all that befitted Dharma Yukam - the virtues, the Sastirankal, the plants and trees, the reptiles and the birds, the divine women and their children - all gathered around Vaikundar. He gave them blessings, and instructed them to live fearlessly. He enjoined upon them to assemble in one place, to drink from the same well, and live happily as per the values of Dharma Yukam.

== See also ==
- List of Ayyavazhi-related articles
- Hindu mythology
- Ayya Vaikundar
- Ayyavazhi Trinity
- Ayyavazhi
- Hinduism
- Hindu reform movements
- Hindu Renaissance
- www.marunthuvazhmalai.com - Marutwa mala Hills, marunthuva malai, marunthuvazh malai]
