= Saptha Kanya =

Mountain range in Maskeliya, Sri Lanka

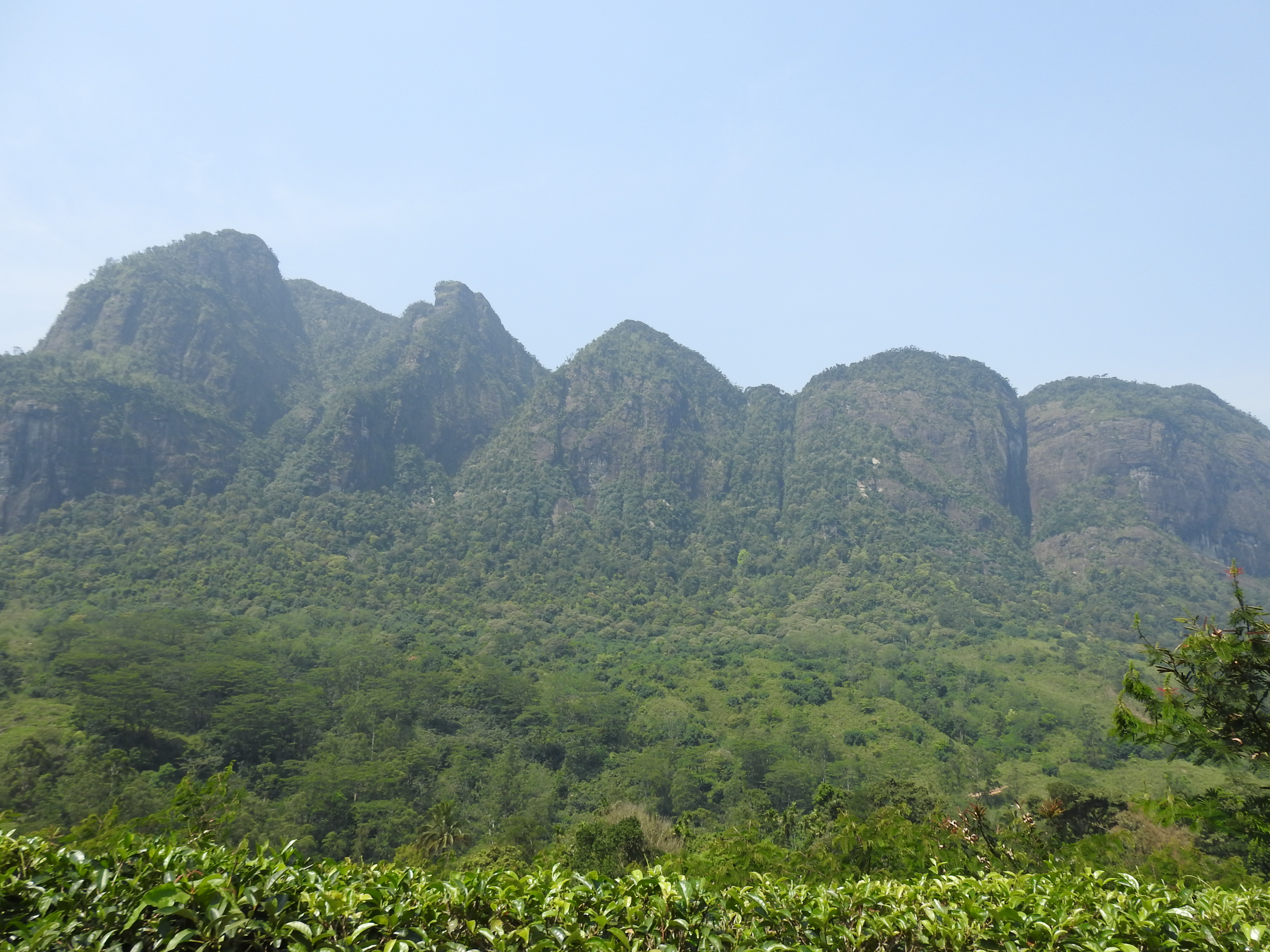
- Saptha Kanya mountain range

Highest point
- Coordinates: 06°53′52.74″N 80°29′59.97″E

Naming
- Native name: සප්ත කන්‍යා (Sinhala)

Geography
- Location within Sri Lanka
- Location: Maskeliya, Sri Lanka

Saptha Kanya (Sinhala: සප්ත කන්‍යා) (Meaning - Seven Virgins) (also known as Upper Laxapana Mountain Range and Seven Virgins Mountain Range) is a mountain range in Maskeliya, Sri Lanka. It is a ridge of seven peaks near the Norton Estate bordering the Sabaragamuwa Province and Central Province. It is located in the boarder of the Peak Wilderness Sanctuary which is a UNESCO world heritage site.The tallest peak is 1,569 m from the sea level.This mountain range is the main habitat range of the Peak Wilderness Sanctuary elephant herd which is the last remaining elephant population in the wet zone and montane region.

== Origin of Name ==
The literal meaning of the name Saptha Kanya is Seven Virgins. However, folklore also mentions that the name is a corruption of Svaptha Kanya, meaning Sleeping Virgin.

== Aircraft Incident ==
4 December 1974, the aircraft, Martinair Flight 138 crashed into the mountain shortly before landing, killing all 191 people aboard – 182 Indonesian hajj pilgrims bound for Mecca, and 9 crew members.

== Gallery ==
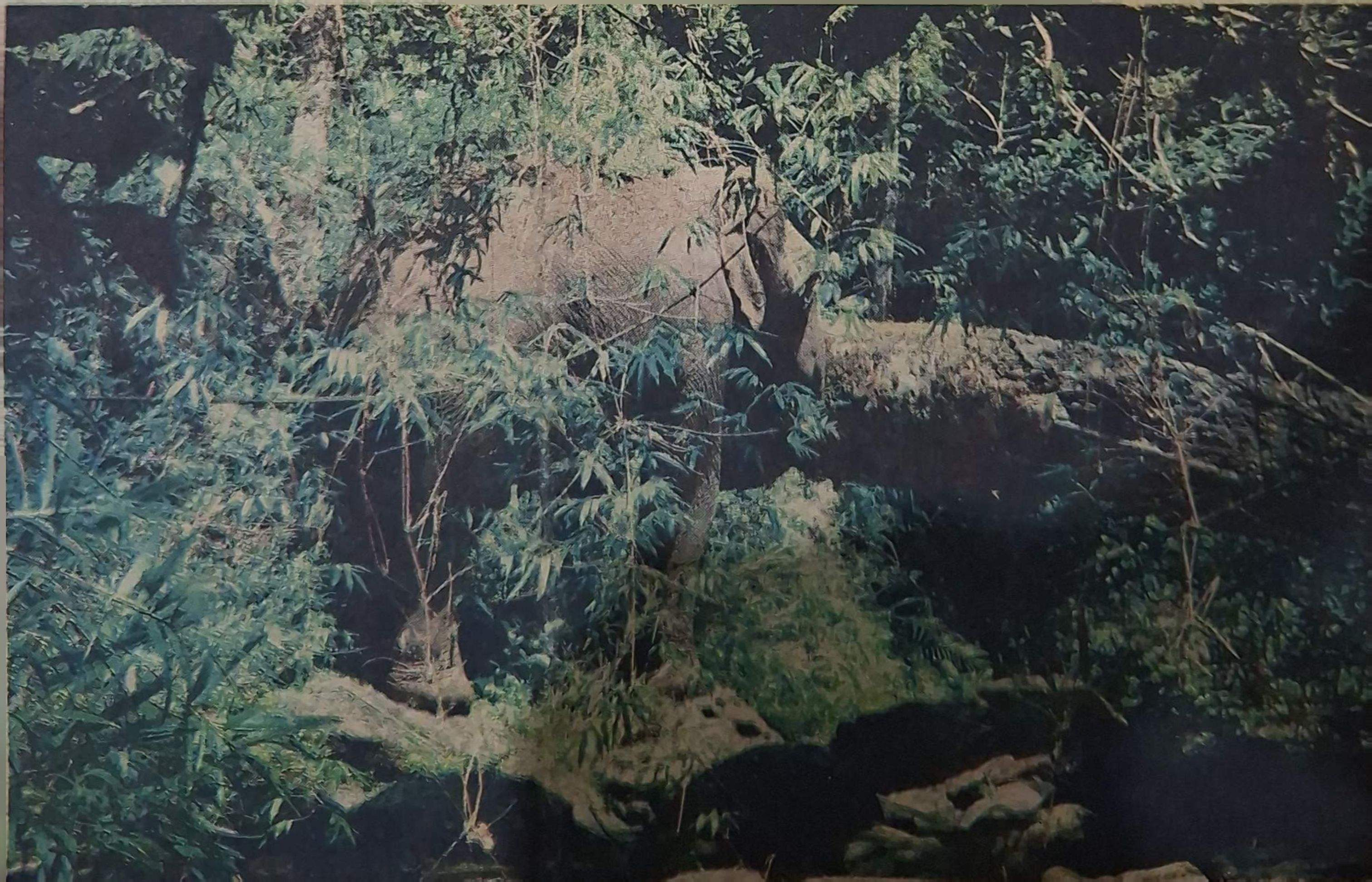
Peak Wilderness Sanctuary elephants

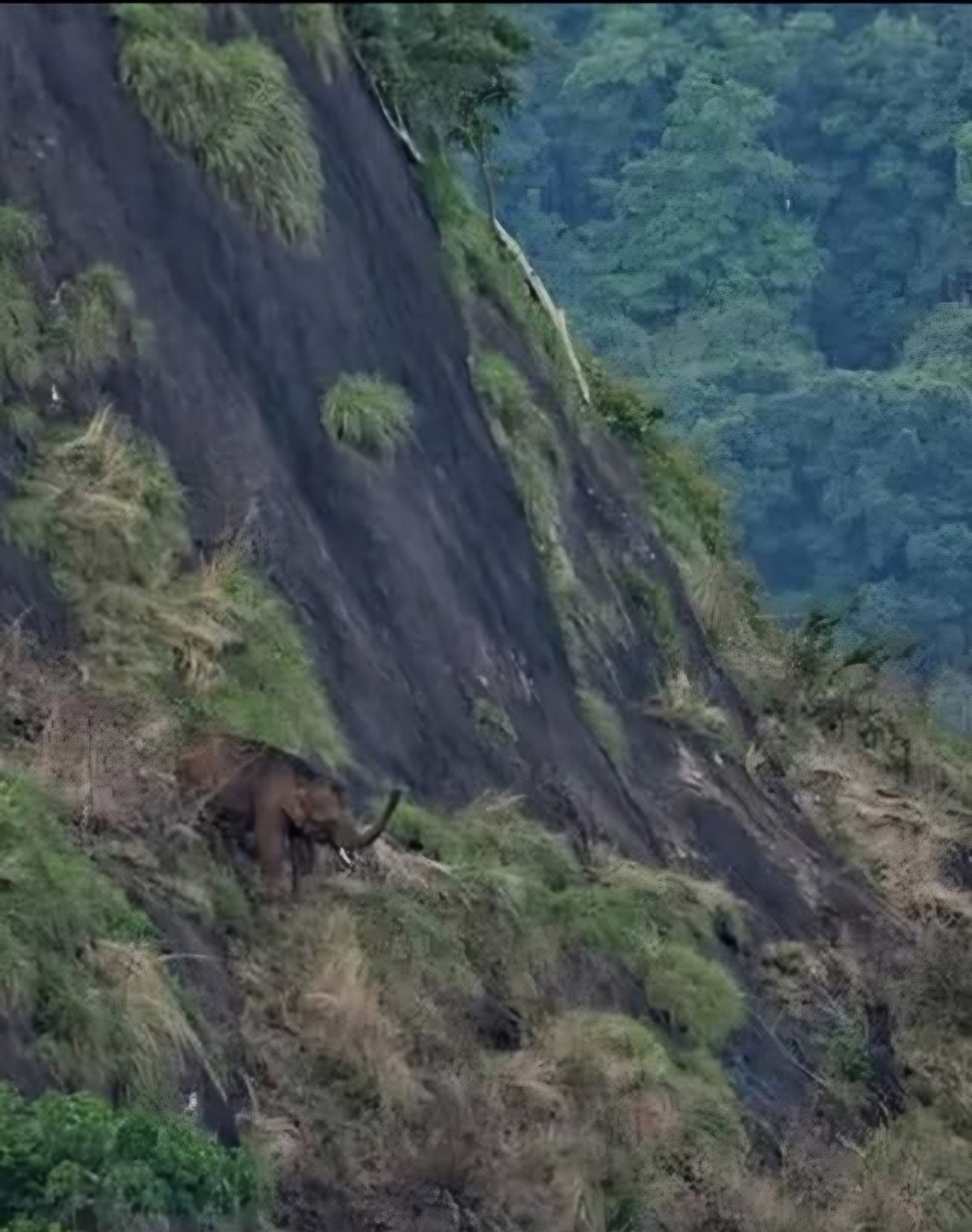
Elephants at the Seven Virgins mountain range in the Peak Wilderness Sanctuary

== See also ==
- Geography of Sri Lanka
- List of mountains in Sri Lanka
