= Kroni =

Figure in Ayyavazhi mythology

Kroni (Tamil: குறோணி) is a figure in Ayyavazhi mythology. He is the primordial manifestation of evil, and manifests in various forms of evil, such as Ravana and Duryodhana, in different ages or yugas. To counteract and destroy the evil of Kroni's manifestations, Mayon (a Tamil name for Vishnu) incarnates as Avatars such as Rama and Krishna. He seems to be more evil than the demon Kali of the Mahabharata and Kalki Purana sharing similarities with Lucifer.

== Kroni in the Akilathirattu Ammanai ==
According to the Akilathirattu Ammanai, the Ayyavazhi holy book, Kroni was born in the first of the Eight Yukams (Yuga (Sanskrit); Aeons (English)) with multitudinous limbs each the size of a mountain, and was the first evil to be born in the Universe. He had a fire of ravenous hunger in his stomach, and he drank all the waters of the sea to quell it. When the water was insufficient, he then swallowed Kailayam (Kailash), the abode of Shiva, and then proceeded to devour the entire Universe. Mayon, residing with Shiva in Kailayam, escaped promptly and undertook a Tavam (Tapas in Sanskrit, Penance in English) to get help from Shiva to destroy Kroni. Shiva granted the help, but made Mayon aware of the necessity of appearing in different forms for the successive six yukams in order to destroy the six fragments of Kroni. Being aware of the mission, Mayon sliced Kroni into six fragments and saved the Universe, and with that event the first Yukam ended.

== Fragments of Kroni ==
The six fragments of Kroni were then born as evil spirits (or Asuras) in six successive Yukams (aeons). In all the yukams Mayon had to incarnate in the world to destroy the evils. The six fragments were known as

1. Kuntomasali
2. Thillaimallalan and Mallosivakanan
3. Suraparppan Sinkamukasuran and Iraniyan
4. Ravanan
5. Thuriyothanan and the Ninety-nine Brothers
6. Kaliyan

Kroni, the spirit of Kali Yuga, is said to be omnipresent in the present age, and this is one of the reasons why followers of Ayya Vazhi, like other Hindus, believe that the current yuga, Kali Yuga, is so degraded.

== Philosophical view ==
Philosophically, Kroni is viewed as the evil which prevents the soul from attaining absolute bliss or knowledge. The six fragments are considered to be six evils found in the six chakras except Sahasrara of the physical human body. It is stated that every human being should overcome the qualities of the six fragments (ill effects) in order to attain divinity (Sahasrara), the state of union with God.

But this view is often criticised by some followers because the Akilam did not mention Kroni in direct relation to Chakras. As some believe that many philosophical concepts are symbolised indirectly as mythical figures in a story form in Akilam, this view on Kroni is accepted during religious studies.

AVATARS AND ASURAS THROUGH THE YUGAS
NO	YUGA	CHAKRA*	ASURAS	Avatar
1	Neetiya Yuga	Bindu	Kroni	Narayana
2	Chathura Yukam	Muladhara	Kundomasali	Mayon
3	Netu Yukam	Swadhisthana	Thillai mallalan and Mallosivahanan	Thirumal
4	Kretha Yuga	Manipura	Surapadman and Iraniyan	Muruga and Narasimha
5	Treta Yuga	Anahata	Ravana	Rama
6	Dvapara Yuga	Vishuddha	Duryodhana	Krishna
7	Kali Yuga	Ajna	Kaliyan	Vaikundar
8	Dharma Yuga	Sahasrara		Narayana

* Chakras :- The yugas assumed as chakras above, is one of the philosophical views and is not mentioned directly in Akilathirattu.

== See also ==
- List of Ayyavazhi-related articles
- Ayyavazhi mythology
- Kaliyan
- Kali (demon)
