= Arul Nool =

Holy scripture of Ayyavazhi

The Arul Nool is a supplement to the Akilattirattu Ammanai, and is likewise considered a holy scripture of Ayyavazhi. This book contains the collection of messages given by Ayya Vaikundar to his Disciples (Citars or Arulalarkal), whose names are unknown. Since they are believed to be composed by Arylalarkar, it acquired the name Arulnool. There is no direct indication within the book regarding the time of its composition.

Within this literature, Ukappadippu, Ucchippadippu, Vazhappadippu and Pothippu are prayer formulae used for worship. Chattu Nittolai is a book that is said to contain the Lamentations of Ayya Vaikundar. It laments on the sufferings of Ayya Vaikundar and the sanar people. There are also views that Ayya Vaikundar himself sang the content of this book when he came from Thiruchendur. Ayya Cicarukku chonna pathiram, Ayya Cicarukku chonna Sivakanta atikara pathiram and Tinkalpatam are instructions given to people on various aspects of life, including the conduct of worship. The instructions found in these are generally rephrasings of those that are given in Akilathirattu. Natuthirvai Ula is a set of predictions for the day of judgment, and Kalyana Vazhthu is a song of felicitation to be sung during marriages in honour of the couples. Saptha kannimar padal is another formulation of the story of Seven Virgins given in Akilathirattu, and Panchatevar Urpatthi is about five folk deities named Sivaimargal, believed to be the soldiers of Ayya Vaikundar.

The word Ukappadippu in Tamil means "The song of the Aeon". It is present in Arul Nool. This Ukappatippu is not to be confused with Uccippadippu, the noon Prayer. The Ukappadippu consists of six verses, and each was chanted eleven times by the devotees in Pathis and Nizhal Thangals twice a day; at dawn and at dusk after the Panividai.

The word Ucchippadippu in Tamil means "Things to be chanted at noontide". This Ucchippatippu is not to be confused with Ukappatippu (see above). The Ucchippadippu is the noon prayer chanted in Ayyavazhi Pathis and Nizhal Thangals, exactly at 12:00 noon. This is also found in Arul Nool.

The Panchathevar Urppatthi section explains the situation and the way by which the Sivaimar were created. The Natuttheervai Ula section details the happenings of the day of final judgment. The Kalyana Vazhthu is the ballad which was sung during the marriages of the followers of Ayyavazhi. Most of the lines of this part are extracts from Akilam.

== See also ==
- List of Ayyavazhi-related articles
