= Sivan =

3rd month of the Hebrew calendar

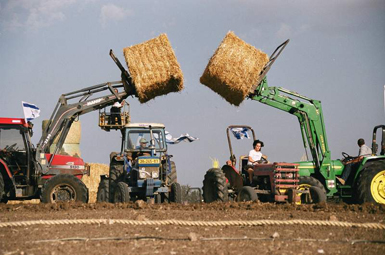
- Shavuot, the Festival of Weeks, marks the day the Torah was given to the Israelites at Mount Sinai. Bikkurim are given as offerings, as in this picture from Nahalal, Israel in 2006.
- Native name: סִיוָן (Hebrew)
- Calendar: Hebrew calendar
- Month number: 3
- Number of days: 30
- Season: Spring (Northern Hemisphere)
- Gregorian equivalent: May–June
- Significant days: Shavuot

Sivan (Hebrew: סִיוָן, Modern: Sivan, Tiberian: Siwān, from Akkadian simānu, meaning "season; time") is the ninth month of the civil year and the third month of the religious year on the Hebrew calendar. It is a month of 30 days. Sivan usually falls in May–June on the Gregorian calendar.

Along with all other current, post-biblical Jewish month names, Sivan was adopted during the Babylonian captivity. In the Babylonian calendar it was named Araḫ Simanu.

== Holidays ==
- 6–7 Sivan – Shavuot

== In Jewish history ==
- 1 Sivan (1096) – Jews in Worms, Germany were massacred as part of the Rhineland massacres by the First Crusade during morning prayers after taking refuge in a local castle. (see "Iyar in Jewish History" for Iyar 8.)
- 4 Sivan (c. 1040 BCE) – Birth of David.
- 6 Sivan (c. ?) - Birth of the Seventh Antediluvian Patriarch/Hero Enoch.
- 6 Sivan (c. 1313 BCE) – The Torah was given to Moses at Mount Sinai and thus observed as the holiday of Shavuot.
- 6 Sivan (c. 940 BCE) - Death of David.
- 6 Sivan (1760) – Death of Baal Shem Tov
- 6 Sivan (1940) – Death of Rabbi Yaakov Yehuda Aryeh Leib Frenkel
- 7 Sivan (c. 1233 BCE) – Moses was "drawn out" of the water at three months old, and thus given the name "Moshe" also observed on the holiday of Shavuot.
- 7 Sivan (1834) – 1834 looting of Safed breaks out
- 7 Sivan (1966) – Death of Rabbi Yisroel Moshe Olewski
- 13 Sivan (1648) – Cossack riots begin with the Khmelnytsky Uprising pogrom
- 17 Sivan (2025) - Israel launched their Military Operation called Operation Rising Lion against Iran, by attacking Iran's Nuclear Weapon Facilities.
- 20 Sivan (1171) – The first blood libel in France – tens of Jewish men and women were burned alive in the French town of Blois on the accusation that Jews used the blood of Christian children in the preparation of matzah for Passover. Commemorated by Twentieth of Sivan, which also marks anniversary of Khmelnytsky Uprising.
- 23 Sivan (474 BCE) – Mordecai and Esther sent letters so that the Jews shall prepare themselves for the annihilation plan orchestrated by Haman to be committed against them on the 13th of the following Adar.
- 27 Sivan (1790) – "Purim of Florence" – a celebration set to celebrate this day when Florentine Jews were saved from a mob.

== See also ==
- Jewish astrology
