= Ayya Vaikundar =

Indian avatar

- Ukara Pranava, Avatar of Narayana
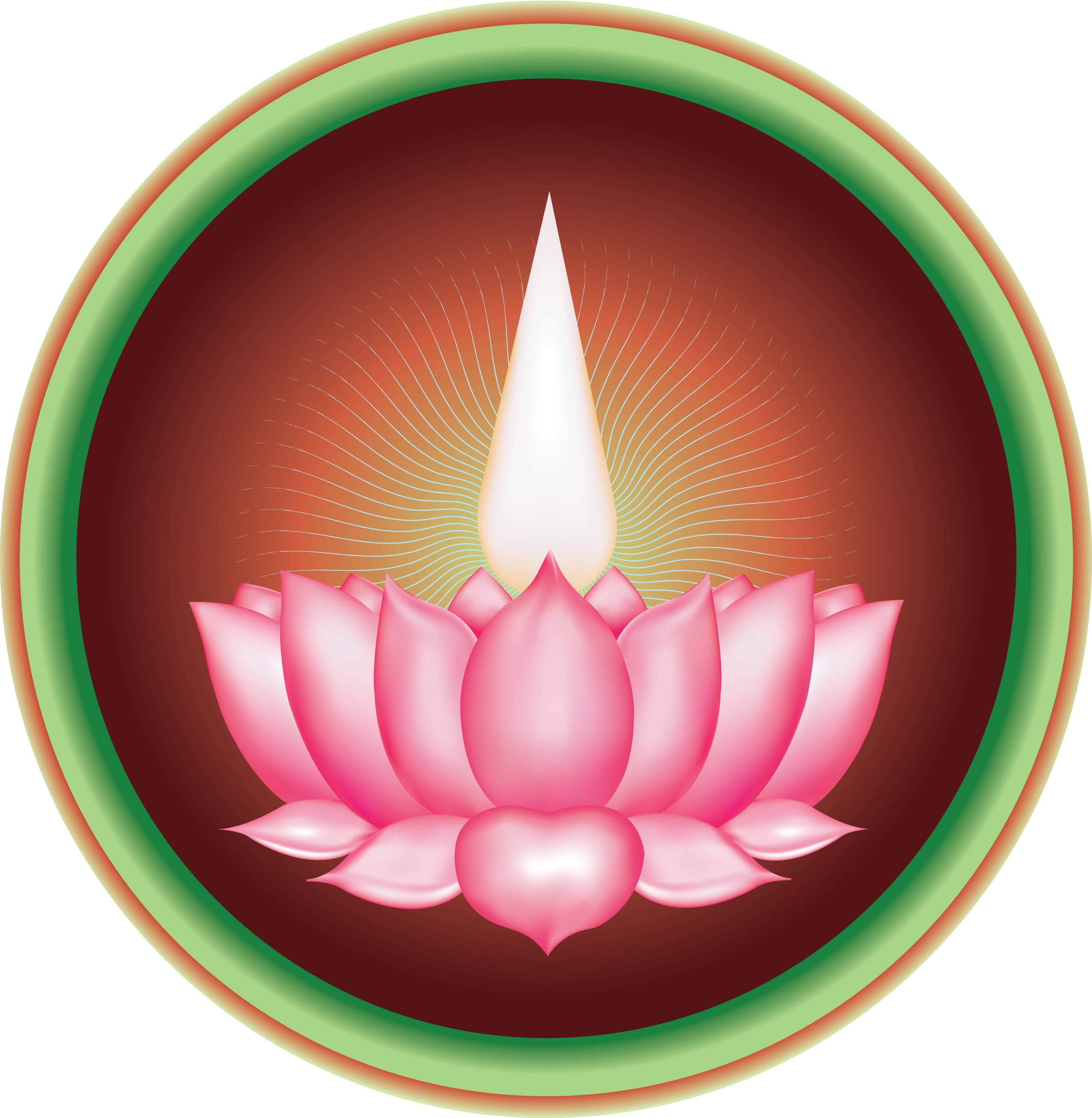
- Other names: Ayya Narayanar, Siva Marugan
- Devanagari: अय्या वैकुण्टर
- Affiliation: Svayam Bhagavan (Ayyavazhi); Avatar of Vishnu
- Predecessor: Krishna
- Abode: Vaikuntha
- Mantra: Ayya Siva siva siva siva Arahara Arahara
- Battles: Ongoing, Destruction of Kali.
- Texts: Akilathirattu Ammanai; Arul Nool
- Gender: Male
- Festivals: Ayya Vaikunda Avataram

Genealogy
- Born: Tiruchendur, Tamil Nadu, India.
- Parents: Vishwa Maha Lakshmi (mother); Vishwa Narayanar (father)

Ayya Vaikundar, also known as Siva Narayana or Vaikunda Swami, was the founder of the Ayyavazhi faith. The Ayyavazhis believe him to be the first and foremost Purna avatar of Eka-Paran and the god Vishnu (Narayana). As per Ayyavazhi mythology detailed in their scriptures, Ayya Vaikundar incarnated in 1833, when he rose from the sea of Tiruchendur in the mortal shell of Vaikundar.

Ayya Vaikundar is a central character in the narratives and teaching of the Ayyavazhi scripture Akilathirattu Ammanai (Akilam).The Ayyayazhis believe that he will be instrumental in the destruction of Kali and establishment of Dharma Yukam. As per Ayyavazhi scriptures, Ayya Vaikundar is the supreme God in his own right.

Most of the preachings and activities found in Akilam and other texts about the life of Ayya Vaikundar was documented historically and detailed in critical contemporary sources externally as well.Though the prime features of Ayya Vaikundar's mission is revealed through Akilathirattu, he also teaches orally. His oral teaching are compiled in the Books of Pathiram, Sivakanta Athikara Pathiram and Thingal Patham. Though Akilam is directly against creating any form of organised religion or belief, the teachings of Akilam and especially few books of Arul Nool form the basis of Ayyavazhi belief. The birth anniversary of Ayya Vaikundar is celebrated as Ayya Vaikunda Avataram on the 20th of Masi as per the Tamil Calendar (3 or 4 March C.E).

== Theology and scripture ==
The life and doctrines of Vaikundar are primarily documented in the Akilathirattu Ammanai (Akilam), which the Ayyavazhi tradition regards as a sacred scripture comparable to the Vedas. According to the text, Vaikundar is the tenth manifestation of Vishnu (Narayana), appearing after the conclusion of the Krishna avatar to establish Dharma in the Kali Yuga.

The scripture was authored by Arigopalan Citar in the form of Tamil verses. Traditional accounts state that the text was dictated to Citar in a dream on 10 December 1841 (27th day of the Tamil month Karthigai, Kollam year 1016) at Thenthamaraikulam Pathi. The Akilathirattu provides a narrative of the evolution of the universe, previous incarnations of Vishnu, and prophecies regarding the future establishment of the Dharma Yukam.

Vaikundar is referred to by various titles, including Ayya, Vaikunda Swamy, Sreeman Narayanaswami, and Siva Narayana. Devotees offer worship at centers designated as Pathi or Thiru Nizhal Thangal.

== Theological background ==
Ayyavazhi theology, as detailed in the Akilathirattu Ammanai, emphasizes the unity of the divine, asserting that various forms of God (such as Shiva and Vishnu) are manifestations of a single supreme power. The scripture describes a grand cosmic narrative involving the destruction of the asura Kroni in the Neettiya Yuga. According to the text, Kroni's spirit was divided into six fragments, each destined to be reborn as an evil force in subsequent ages (Yugas).

To combat these fragments and preserve Dharma, Vishnu is believed to have manifested in a series of incarnations across the Yugas:

- Chatur Yuga and Nedu Yuga: Combating the demons Gundomosali and Thillai Mallaan.
- Kretha Yuga: Manifesting as Muruga and Narasimha to destroy Singha Mugha and Hiranya.
- Thretha Yuga: Manifesting as Rama to defeat Ravana.
- Dwapara Yuga: Manifesting as Krishna to side with the Pandavas and reform the world.

The narrative concludes with the Kali Yuga, where the final fragment of Kroni is believed to have manifested as the spirit of Kali (Kalian). In response to the oppression and social injustice prevalent in this age, Vishnu is said to have promised to incarnate as Vaikundar to protect the oppressed, specifically the Sandroars, and establish a new era of righteousness known as Dharma Yukam.

"According to the Ayyavazhi scripture, the incarnation of Vaikundar in the Kali Yuga was a divine response to the social injustice of the era. The text narrates that Vishnu entered the sea at Tiruchendur to encounter Lakshmi, who had manifested as a golden flame (Magara). On 1 March 1833 (20 Masi, 1008), he is believed to have emerged from the sea in the form of a Pandaram (mendicant). Dressed in ochre robes and carrying a rishi's wand, he began his mission to establish equality and dismantle the influence of Kali."

== Penance ==
The penance consisted of three stages, each spanning two years. A tradition describes his postures during the six-year tavam as follows: during the first two years, he stood inside a six feet deep pit; during the next two years, he squatted on the ground; and during the last two years, he sat on a raised platform. His appearance was squalid, "long and entangled plait of hair" and frayed clothes. He spoke less and subsisted on frugal meals.

The Akilam speaks of the act of incinerating the evil spirits as an important event in the life of Ayya Vaikundar. It took place when he was performing his penance, which had been announced by him to be the means of destroying the kalimayai – the illusory evil force.He, then, gathered the people around, and caused some of them to get possessed of the evil spirits (peyattam).The possessed ones came and danced in front of the crowd as if the evil spirits had come upon them. Vaikundar, then, ordered these evil spirits to make an oath, in front of the people, to surrender their powers and get burned up in flames. When he had finished his orders, those dancing under the duress of possession got exhausted and fell flat on the ground. Thus the evil spirits were incinerated.

Vaikundar performed another action to 'seize the esoteric evil powers'. The Akilam says that, he took away the powers of those who knew to perform witchcraft, sorcery, and other magical rituals. People living in the hills, called as Kanikkarar, were believed to be powerful shamans or witchdoctors, having powers to contain or to provoke the demons. Vaikundar, in a trance, made some of these Kanikkarar to testify in front of the people that they had surrendered their powers. People grew appreciative of Vaikundar's actions. They began addressing him as Vaikuntacami. This implied an attribution of divinity to Vaikundar.

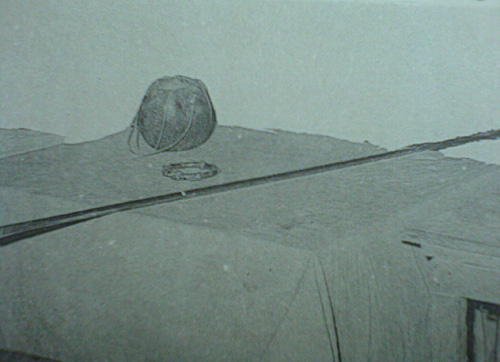
The things used by Ayya Vaikundar; 'Surai Koodu', 'Pirambu' and 'Thandayam'.

The fame of Vaikundar had begun to spread in the countries of Travancore and Tirunelveli, and he had been gradually recognised socially as a religious person with extraordinary powers.In the religious parlance of the time, he was addressed as a Pantaram, a religious person hailing from, and serving the ordinary folk. Akilattirattu addresses him as Pantaram.

People came to him to listen to his teachings and instructions, to be cured by him of different diseases, to witness, worship and serve a religious person. Vaikundar encouraged the people to come together around a well to take a ritual bath, irrespective of caste differences. He encouraged them to dine together in his presence.

He gave out a number of teachings and instructions, the central point of which was that he had come to abolish Kali Yukam, and to usher in an age of Dharma Yukam, during the time of which the now-oppressed and suffering people would be liberated and rule the land under his leadership. 'Uplift of the lowly is dharmam’was a constant refrain in his teachings.People were encouraged to serve as catalysts for the destruction of Kali by transforming themselves to be 'people of Dharma Yukam' and to acquire a new character. The new character would come upon them, he said, if they learned to live with self-respect, social dignity and fearlessness. Underscoring the importance of self-respect and social dignity, he said, ‘if one lives with dignity and self-respect, the kali would destroy itself’. He said when people grew out of kalimayai, Dharma Yukam would unfold itself and in that age, he would rule over the people as Dharma Raja, the king of Dharma Yukam.

== Arrest and post-imprisonment ==
Vaikundar made some controversial statements like mentioning the Travancore king as ‘Devil in Ananthapuri’ and the British rule as ‘Rule of White Devils’. Against the background of the growing popularity of Ayya Vaikundar and the convergence of people around him in multitudes, a complaint was lodged against him with the King of Travancore Swathi Thirunal Rama Varma . The King arrested Ayya Vaikundar in 1838 and imprisoned him at Singarathoppe jail. After 110 days of imprisonment, on 26 March 1839 he was released by Swathithirunal on the advice of Thycaud Ayya who was the Guru of Swathi thirunal Maharaj and a disciple of Ayya Vaikundar as well.

After returning from the prison, Ayya Vaikundar inspired a group of his devotees to undertake a religious exercise called Thuvayal Thavasu.He also performed miracles. He married Saptha Kanniyar as Narayana (see: Marriage with the Seven Virgins), the seven deities in the form of Ekam (see:Marriage with the Deities). He initiated festivities (see: Festivals and Celebrations). The deities were made to 'come upon' some of the female devotees who became their human media and a marriage ceremony was performed.Ceremonial processions were held amidst singing, incantations and shouts of joy by the followers. Several rites and rituals were instituted during these occasions.

Vaikundar's growing influence in the Travancore region, particularly his message of social equality and his challenge to caste-based norms, attracted the attention of the state authorities. His teachings, which encouraged devotees from different castes to bathe in common wells and dine together, were seen as a disruption to the established social order. In 1838, Vaikundar was arrested by order of the Travancore monarch, Swathi Thirunal Rama Varma. Historical accounts, including reports from the London Missionary Society, document his imprisonment at Singarathoppe jail. He was released after approximately 110 days, in 1839. Following his release, his followers began the Thuvayal Thavasu, a practice involving collective penance and strict dietary and ritual observances, which helped consolidate the Ayyavazhi community and sustain his teachings on Dharma.

== Timeline of events ==
According to the Akilathirattu Ammanai and Ayyavazhi tradition, the following timeline outlines the major events associated with Vaikundar's mission:

Date	Event
1 March 1833	Traditionally recorded incarnation at the Tiruchendur seashore.
January 1834	Commencement of the six-year Tavam (penance) at Swamithoppu.
1838–1839	Imprisonment at Singarathoppe jail by the Travancore authorities.
March 1840	Start of the Thuvayal Thavasu at Vakai Pathi.
11 December 1840	Traditionally cited date for the commission of the Akilathirattu scripture.
1843–1850	Establishment of various Pathis (Ambala Pathi, Poo Pathi) and marriage ceremonies.
2 June 1851	Return to Vaikundam (conclusion of the incarnation).
1892	Visit of Swami Vivekananda to Swamithoppu (according to oral tradition).
1939	First printed release of the Akilathirattu Ammanai.

== Dharma Yukam ==
Ayyavazhi belief centers on the future establishment of Dharma Yukam (the Age of Righteousness). According to the Akilathirattu Ammanai, the present Kali Yuga will conclude with a final judgment where the spirit of Kali (Kalian) is scrutinized for his actions across the seven Yugas. The scripture prophesies that after the destruction of evil and the locking of the doors of hell, a total regeneration of the universe will occur.

This new age is characterized by the complete removal of caste barriers, the restoration of natural harmony, and a social order governed by thirty-two holy virtues. Vaikundar is regarded as the central figure of this future age, establishing a state where all living beings coexist in equality under a single rule of law.

The scripture records that Vaikundar's incarnation on Earth lasted eighteen years and ninety-one days. His mission concluded on 2 June 1851 (21 Vaikasi, Kollam year 1026), an event the tradition describes as his return to Vaikundam. Followers believe that his teachings and the establishment of Pathis laid the foundation for the eventual dawn of the Dharma Yukam.

== Legacy ==
Later Vaikundar was invited by his devotees to their homes and treated in a grand manner. By way of soliciting his blessings, his devotees carried him to different places. During these occasions, he laid foundations in various places for small shrine-like centres, called Nizhal Thangals. Vaikundar came to recognize five individuals as his disciples Through one of his disciples, Hari Gopalan Citar, he wrote the holy book, called Akilam.

== Popular culture ==
The film Ayyavazhi released in 2008 was based on the life of Ayya Vaikundar. The film Oru Kudaikul (2021) also featured the tale of Ayya Vaikundar.

== Sources ==
- Manibharathi (1 August 1995). "Samithoppu Ayya Narayana Cuvami". Tina Tanti Kutumba Malar.
- Nadar, T. Palramachandran (1989). Akilattirattu Ammanai.
- Pandiyan, M. S. S. (1992). "Meanings of Colonialism and Nationalism: An essay on Vaikunda Swamy Cult". Studies in History. VIII (2): 177. doi:10.1177/025764309200800202. S2CID 161124037.
- Pathippakam, Vivekanantha (2004). Akilattirattu Ammanai.
- Thuvarakapathi, Thechanathu. Thechanathu Thuvarakapathi Akilathirattu Akakorvai.
- "Holy Akilathirattu", R. Hari Gopalan Citar, Thenthamarikualam, 10 December 1841, First Publication 1939
- "Holy Akilathirattu Scripture", R. Gopalakrishnan, Chennai, First Publication 2019, Published by Akilattirattu India Mission
- "Holy Akilathirattu Descriptive Text" Part 2, A. Manibharathi, Chennai, First Publication 2003
- "Holy Akilathirattu Text", T. Balasundaram M.A., B.Ed. Swamithoppu, Third Publication 2013, Published by Ayya Vaikundar Veeman Citar Foundation
- "Holy Akilathirattu Ammani Recitation Text", A. Arisundra Mani, First Publication 2002
