= Ayyavazhi holy sites =

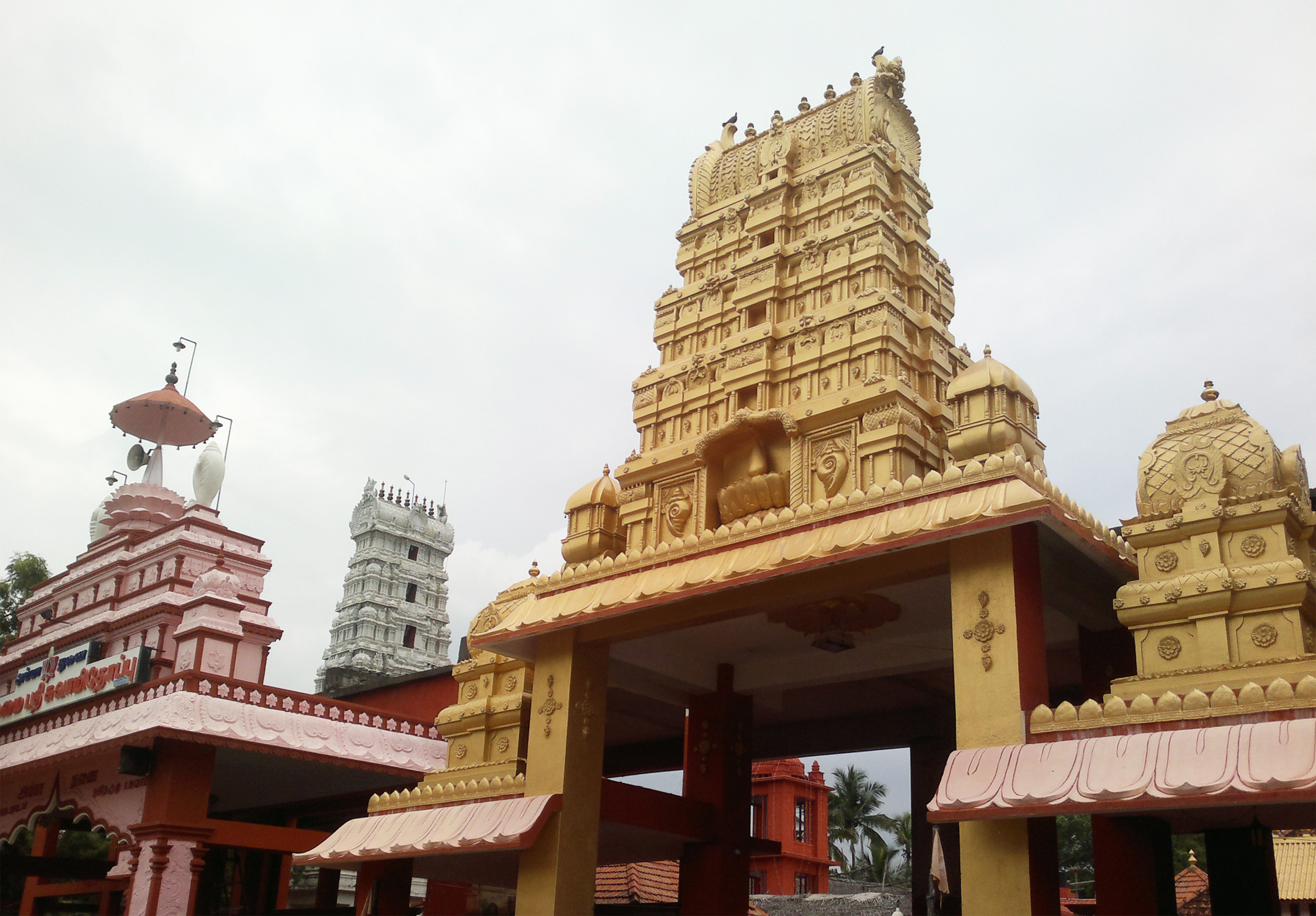
Swamithope Pathi, considered one of the Primary holy places of Ayyavazhi

The holy places of Ayyavazhi includes the following

Primary Pathis

1. Swamithope pathi
2. Ambala Pathi
3. Mutta Pathi
4. Thamaraikulam Pathi
5. Poo Pathi

Other Pathis

1. Vaikunda pathi
2. Vakai Pathi
3. Avathara Pathi

Primary Thangals

1. Chettikudiyiruppu
2. Agastheeswaram
3. Paloor
4. Sundavilai
5. Vadalivilai
6. Kadambankulam
7. Pambankulam

Other Important Thangals

1. Vellai Chuvamiyar Pathi
2. Veppankattu Pathi
3. Pazhavar
4. Sidambara puram
5. Kalakkadu
6. Thysaiyan Vilai

Other holy sites

1. Vaikunda Malai
2. Marunthuvazh Malai

== See also ==
- List of Ayyavazhi-related articles
- Pancha pathi
