= Historical Vaikundar =

Historical Vaikundar (1833–1851)

Ayya Vaikundar (1833–1851), according to the Ayyavazhi tradition, is regarded as the tenth incarnation of Sriman Narayana and as the incarnation associated with the culmination of Kali and the restoration of Dharma. His advent is understood within Ayyavazhi theology as having occurred at a time when Adharma had become predominant and Dharma had declined. In this context, his incarnation is interpreted in accordance with the principle expressed in the Bhagavad Gita: whenever Dharma declines and Adharma rises, the Divine manifests to restore righteousness.

According to Akilathirattu Ammanai, the principal sacred text of Ayyavazhi, Ayya Vaikundar manifested in the sea at Tiruchendur on the twentieth day of the month of Masi in Kollam Year 1008 (1833), as the son of Sriman Narayana and Goddess Lakshmi. From Tiruchendur, he subsequently came to the place now known as Swamithope, where he began his mission among the people.

At Swamithope, Ayya Vaikundar brought people together and proclaimed the principles of social equality and spiritual unity. His teachings rejected distinctions based on caste and social status and emphasized that humanity is one community and that there is one Supreme Divine Reality. Through his teachings and activities, he sought to establish Dharma, equality, and unity among the people and to proclaim the spiritual purpose of his incarnation.

Following the advent of Ayya Vaikundar, the Ayyavazhi tradition holds that a renewed consciousness of Dharma began to emerge among the people during Kali Yuga, leading to the emergence of individuals who stood for righteousness, equality, and social justice. Within the theological framework of Ayyavazhi, Ayya Vaikundar is therefore regarded as the first and foremost divine voice to openly proclaim and uphold Dharma in the Kali Yuga. He is revered as the Supreme Personality of Godhead who manifested to restore Dharma, challenge Adharma, and establish the principles of equality and righteousness among humanity. His teachings and mission are understood as marking a significant spiritual and social awakening in the southern regions of the Indian subcontinent.

== Early life ==
According to Akilathirattu Ammanai, the sacred scripture of Ayyavazhi, the life and manifestation of Ayya Vaikundar cannot be understood merely as the life of an ordinary historical individual. He is understood within the Ayyavazhi tradition as the tenth incarnation of Sriman Narayana, whose divine manifestations occurred throughout the successive Yugas for the destruction of Adharma and the establishment of Dharma.

The Ayyavazhi tradition describes a succession of Yugas beginning with the First Yuga and continuing through Neeti Yuga, Chathura Yuga, Nedu Yuga, Kretha Yuga, Treta Yuga, Dvapara Yuga and Kali Yuga, followed by the coming Dharma Yuga. In each age, the Supreme Divine is understood to have manifested in an appropriate form to overcome the forces of Adharma.

In the First Yuga, Adi Narayana is described as destroying Kroni. In the subsequent Yugas, different manifestations of the Divine are associated with the destruction of various forces of Adharma, including Kundomasali, Thillai Mallalan, Mallosi Vahanan, Surapadman, Singamukha Vahanan, Hiranyan, Ravana and Duryodhana. In the present Kali Yuga, the Divine manifestation is identified with Ayya Vaikundar, whose mission is associated with the destruction of Kali and the establishment of Dharma.

From the Ayyavazhi theological perspective, the divine manifestations preceding Vaikundar include several well-known forms of the Supreme Divine, such as Matsya, Kurma, Vamana, Narasimha, Rama, Krishna and Murugan. These manifestations are understood as different forms through which the same Supreme Divine intervened in different Yugas according to the needs of each age.

Ayya Vaikundar is therefore understood as the divine manifestation of the Seventh Yuga, the Kali Yuga, and as the tenth incarnation of Sriman Narayana. His incarnation marks the transition toward the establishment of Dharma and the eventual emergence of Dharma Yuga. According to Ayyavazhi belief, even in the forthcoming Dharma Yuga, Ayya Vaikundar will continue to be the supreme divine presence, ruling through the principles of one word, one flag and one language, signifying spiritual unity, Dharma and the oneness of humanity.

Thus, the early life and mission of Ayya Vaikundar are viewed in Ayyavazhi tradition not as an isolated historical episode, but as part of a larger divine chronology extending across the Yugas, culminating in the incarnation of Vaikundar for the destruction of Kali and the establishment of Dharma.

== Incarnation ==
According to Akilathirattu Ammanai, the incarnation of Ayya Vaikundar took place at the culmination of Kali Yuga, when Kali had become fully manifested and Adharma had spread throughout the world. Having obtained numerous boons, Kali is described in Ayyavazhi tradition as having entered the minds of living beings through the power of Maya and as having attempted to destroy Dharma completely. As a result, the entire world suffered under the influence of Kali. The Jivatmas were subjected to bondage, freedom was suppressed, and the righteous were unable to live according to Dharma. Dharma had become subdued, while Adharma had risen to prominence.

It was in this condition that the Supreme Divine manifested, in accordance with the divine principle expressed in the Vedic tradition that whenever Dharma declines and Adharma prevails, the Divine manifests for the restoration of righteousness. When Kali had reached its culmination, Sriman Narayana manifested at the sacred sea of Tiruchendur, known in Ayyavazhi tradition as the Thirupparkadal.

According to Ayyavazhi theology, this manifestation represents a profound divine mystery. The primordial principles represented by Akaram, Ukaram and Makaram came together and manifested as the sacred Pranava, Om. From this divine unity emerged the radiant form of Vaikundam, described as the Supreme Brahmanic Light and the manifestation of the Supreme Divine. Sriman Narayana manifested in the divine lineage of Vaikundar, with Narayana understood as the Father, Mother Mahalakshmi as the Mother, and Ayya Vaikundar as the Son—the incarnate manifestation of the Supreme Divine for the Kali Yuga.

At Tiruchendur, Ayya Vaikundar revealed the divine teaching known as Vinchai—a sacred instruction through which the Divine purpose and the principles governing the coming transformation of the world were revealed. Through this divine revelation, Vaikundar made known who he was, why he had manifested, what his divine mission was, how humanity should live, how Kali would be destroyed, and how Dharma would ultimately flourish.

Thus, the manifestation that emerged from the sacred Thirupparkadal at Tiruchendur is understood in Ayyavazhi tradition as the Ayya Vaikundar Avatar, the incarnation of the Supreme Divine for the culmination of Kali and the establishment of Dharma.

Following his manifestation at Tiruchendur, Ayya Vaikundar proceeded to Swamithope. There, the Divine appeared before humanity in a human form, while remaining the Supreme Divine in essence. At Swamithope, he began to gather people from different communities and social backgrounds, proclaiming the principles of unity, equality and Dharma. Large numbers of people gathered around him, drawn by his teachings and divine mission.

The events that followed at Swamithope and the continuation of Ayya Vaikundar's divine mission form the next stage of his life and are described in the subsequent sections.

== Penance ==
After making the proclamations, Vaikundar proceeded towards Kanyakumari. There he instructed the people to give-up the rituals and religious ceremonies and reached Poovandanthope. It appears that few incidents in which he was ill-treated happened on the way. On the other hand he was also warmly welcomed at some places. He was also said to have performed miracles at various places through the way. As per writer Amalan, Vaikundar stayed at Udangudi on Masi 21 and reached Poovandanthoppe on 22 Masi 1008 ME.The news about the Thiruchendur incident spread all around the Villages nearby. After this incident people started calling him devoutly as ‘Ayya’ means Father in Tamil. He also travelled northwards to various parts of Tirunelveli to reveal his arrival. He travelled northwards up to Kadambankulam, through Pillaiyar Kudiyiruppu, Avaraikulam, Vadakkankulam, and Pambankulam.At Kadambankulam, the northernmost venue to which Vaikundar travelled, today stands one among the rare Nizhal Thangals which face geographic north. Vaikundar selected five Seedars. Two among them, Dharma Seedar and Bheeman Seedar were selected before his northwards travel, Arjunan Seedar was identified during the travel while the remaining two of them, Sahadevan Seedar, and Nakulan Seedar were selected after the travel.Though Arjunan Seedar was identified earlier he was selected only afterwards. The episode of his northwards travel was documented in very few sources.

After concluding his travel he returned to Swamithope by December 1833 and commenced his penance by mid January 1834 during the auspicious month of Margazhi. It consists of three phases. The first phase of his penance lasted for two years from January 1843 to December 1835. The Phase I is named Yuga Thavasu and was intended to abolish the rule of the evil force, Kali and for the subsequent end of Kali Yuga.The Yuga Thavasu is performed in a standing posture within a 6 feet-deep pit. During this phase he used to talk less and believed to have taken no food. The second Phase is dedicated for the elimination of the case based and other discriminations among human communities and for the upliftment of Santror. The second phase too lasted for two years beginning in December 1835 till December 1837.This phase is performed at the ground level in a sitting posture. He took only rice gruel. However, some sources claimed that he took milk and fruits during Phase II.

Phase III of the penance began by January 1838. This last phase is meant for the upliftment of women and for the betterment of his progeny.Phase III is performed by him on a raised pedestal. The last phase too was intended to extend for two complete years but was interrupted by the King of Travancore.

== Divine Acts and the Proclamation of Dharma ==
After taking his abode at Swamithope, Ayya Vaikundar is described in Akilathirattu Ammanai as undertaking a series of divine acts (Thiruvilaiyadal) for the protection and upliftment of the people. These acts were directed towards removing various forms of fear, oppression and harmful practices that were believed to have afflicted society during the period of Kali.

Among the first of these acts was the removal of the suffering caused by supernatural forces. According to the Ayyavazhi tradition, Vaikundar caused the spirits and demons that were believed to trouble the people to assemble before him at Swamithope, in the presence of Sage Narada and a vast gathering of people. He then destroyed their power and proclaimed that the people need no longer fear them. Through this act, he symbolically proclaimed the end of the age of fear and the beginning of an age in which the people could live under the protection of Dharma.

Vaikundar also challenged practices associated with sorcery, witchcraft and harmful magical rites. Those who practised such activities attempted to employ their powers against him, but their practices were rendered ineffective. According to the tradition, they eventually sought guidance through a diviner, who informed them that the incarnation of Narayana as Vaikundar had already occurred and that the divine authority of the age now rested with him. They were therefore advised to approach Vaikundar.

The practitioners of sorcery subsequently came to Swamithope and submitted themselves before Ayya Vaikundar. He admonished them for causing suffering to the people and instructed them to abandon such practices. Instead, he directed them towards honest and productive occupations, particularly agriculture, by which they could earn their livelihood without harming others. He also warned them against returning to their former practices and declared that such activities would no longer have a place under the order of Dharma.

Through these acts, Vaikundar is portrayed not merely as removing particular forms of fear and superstition, but as transforming the social and moral conditions that enabled people to exploit and oppress one another. Addressing the vast gathering at Swamithope, he proclaimed that his people should no longer live in fear or dependence upon those who claimed supernatural powers. He encouraged them to abandon false beliefs, stand with courage, and live according to Dharma.

Following these divine acts, Vaikundar began to proclaim a comprehensive teaching concerning the way humanity should live during Kali Yuga. He called upon the people to unite in Eka Para Thanjam, to live with one mind, to reject offerings and bribery, to recognize the one Supreme Divine, and to refrain from unnecessary ritual practices. He instructed them not to kindle ritual fires or lamps as acts of external worship, not to cultivate excessive worldly desire, not to commit wrongdoing, and not to abandon justice, gratitude and moral conduct. Above all, he taught them to keep the name of Narayana constantly in their hearts.

Through these teachings, Vaikundar proclaimed the oneness of God and the unity of humanity and sought to establish a way of life centred on Dharma, truth, equality and spiritual discipline. His message attracted an increasingly large gathering of people at Swamithope.

The growing influence of Vaikundar eventually came to the attention of the ruler of Travancore. According to Akilathirattu Ammanai, Kali is portrayed as having manifested through the authority and mindset of the ruling power of the period. The ruler, hearing reports about Vaikundar and the large number of people gathering around him, became concerned about his growing influence.

The king consequently sent officials to investigate what was taking place at Swamithope. When they arrived, they witnessed Vaikundar addressing a vast gathering of people and proclaiming his divine mission. They reported to the king that a person had appeared who declared that he had come to rule the world through one word, one flag and one language, and that multitudes of people had gathered around him.

The king interpreted this development as a challenge to his authority and decided to act against Vaikundar. An attempt was therefore made to send forces from Suchindram towards Swamithope under the leadership of Gowda Sasthriyan in order to apprehend Vaikundar.

According to the Ayyavazhi account, however, a person within the royal assembly warned the king that Vaikundar was not an ordinary individual. He was described as one who transcended distinctions of caste, status, wealth, gender and social identity, and as one who regarded all living beings without discrimination. The adviser therefore urged the king to withdraw from the proposed action.

Despite this warning, the royal forces proceeded towards Swamithope. The confrontation between Vaikundar and the authority of the Travancore kingdom forms the next significant stage of his mission.

== Arrest ==
The teachings of Vaikundar created an excitement among the people and it began to reflect in the socio-religious arena of the 19th century South Travancore and South Tirunelveli. The lower classes began to resist several oppressions all of them until then remained unchallenged. The upper classes viewed this as a challenge against them as they believed that the collapse of the existing system may undermine their social status seriously. Numerous complaints were made before the King of Travancore by the upper classes against Vaikundar and his activities.But the king seems to ignore all of them initially.The issue was brought before the king Swathi Thirunal Rama Varma once again during his Suchindrum visit.Being a staunch believer of the Varna system, it seems hard for the King to believe Vaikundar, whose community was outside the caste-fold, to be the avatar of Narayana.Moreover, the claim made by Vaikundar that himself will rule the world as an undisputed King misled the king. He suspected that Vaikundar was provoking the people and was plotting for a revolt against the Kingdom.Fearing a revolution he sent the armed forces immediately to arrest Vaikundar. The large gathering around Vaikundar confronted with the army. Vaikundar refrained them from getting violent and appealed them to pave the way for the forces.The soldiers arrested him and took him to Suchindrum.

At Suchindrum, Vaikundar was brought in front of the king. He, who already had doubts about the divinity of Vaikundar, intended to test his supernatural ability by hiding his ring in his hand and asking him to name it.Vaikundar preferred not to answer and to remain silent.The king ordered his imprisonment immediately.He was imprisoned in a confinement filled with sewage infested with worms.It is also noted by some that he was asked to take alcohol in which various poisonous herbs was mixed up. Miraculously Vaikundar remained unaffected. He was imprisoned there for two days. Then the king ordered him to be taken to Thiruvananthapuram, the capital of Travancore. The forces proceed towards Thiruvananthapuram through Kottar, Parvathipuram, Chungankadai and reached Thuckalay. That night he was kept imprisoned at Manalikkara.The next day the soldiers took him to Thiruvananthapuram via Balaramapuram. At Thiruvananthapuram, Vaikundar was jailed at Singarathope open prison.Jubliant followers of Vaikundar accompanied him all through his way and stayed at the prison premises.

During his imprisonment period people in large numbers rushed to Singarathope to avail his blessings.Vaikundar was subjected to several severe tribulations and cruel treatments. However, he continued preaching and healing there too. He also said to have performed various miracles at the prison Attempts were also made to burn him in lime kiln and in Chilli go-down. He had overcome all these miraculously. He was finally thrown into the cage of a hungry Tiger in front of the administrators, army staff and public. Contrary to the expectation of the officials the tiger did not jump onto its prey. One of the soldiers tried to prod it with a spear in order to provoke it.The tiger caught hold of the spear and in no time left it abruptly when the other end of the spear ripped the abdomen of a priest and he died on the spot. This event shocked the king as he believed that killing a priest would fetch divine wrath. He ordered the release of Vaikundar immediately upon the condition that he would restrict his activities and preaching only to his caste. Vaikundar not only refused to sign the condition but also refused to accept his release. He tore the royal writ into pieces since his mission was the betterment and equality of all castes.He proclaimed that he would be accepting the release only after the completion imprisonment period.

He remained in jail as a prisoner for the full 3 ¾ months. He was released after 110 days, in the first week of March. These events enhanced the fame of Vaikundar further all over the kingdom.His followers carried him back as a procession and they reached Poovandanthope on 19 Masi 1013 M.E (1 March 1838), a day before the 5th anniversary of his incarnation.

== Completion of the Divine Mission ==
Following his release from imprisonment at Singarathoppu under the authority of the Travancore ruler, Ayya Vaikundar returned triumphantly to Swamithope and continued his divine mission among the people. His subsequent activities, as described in Akilathirattu Ammanai, focused on establishing Dharma and revealing the unity underlying the various forms of worship prevalent among the people.

As part of this mission, Vaikundar is described as revealing his Visvarupa, through which he demonstrated the oneness of the Supreme Divine. In this divine manifestation, the different forms of worship were revealed as expressions of the same Supreme Reality. He manifested as Shiva together with Parvati and Bhagavathi, as Brahma together with Saraswati, as Maha Vishnu together with Lakshmi, and as Murugan together with Valli and Deivanai. Through these manifestations and divine marriages, Vaikundar revealed the principle that the various divine forms are ultimately united in the one Supreme Divine: "I am all, and all are within Me."

Before these manifestations, Vaikundar is also described as accepting the Seven Sapta Matars and revealing their divine role in relation to the Santror people. Through them, the lineage and spiritual significance of the Santror were revealed, and the people were shown the unity of the Divine beyond distinctions between different forms and traditions of worship.

These divine acts culminated in a series of sacred manifestations and marriages through which Vaikundar demonstrated the unity of the Divine with the forces of creation, preservation and spiritual order. The culmination of these events is associated with Ambalappathi in the present-day Kanyakumari district.

At Poopathi, before completing his incarnation, Vaikundar is described in the Ayyavazhi tradition as manifesting together with Bhumadevi and uniting with her. This event is understood as a revelation that the Divine is inseparably connected with the Earth and with the entire creation. Through these manifestations, Vaikundar is portrayed as revealing his identity as the Supreme Divine from whom the universe originates and by whom it is sustained.

At Ambalappathi, Vaikundar completed the final stage of his earthly incarnation. According to Akilathirattu Ammanai, the Supreme Divine manifested as Narayana, the Father, and Vaikundar, the Son, thereby presenting the relationship between the Divine Father and the incarnate Son. A divine celestial vehicle was sent to Ambalappathi to receive Vaikundar and return him to Vaikundam.

When the divine messenger Sadai Muni arrived with the celestial vehicle and informed Vaikundar that he was being summoned, Vaikundar asked for a short period of time before departing. He then turned towards the gathered Santror and his devotees and assured them that they would ultimately attain him and should not be anxious or afraid. He is described as blessing the people, holding their hands and expressing his assurance of their eventual spiritual fulfilment.

Vaikundar then entered the celestial vehicle and ascended to Vaikundam, thereby completing the purpose of his incarnation in the world. The event is understood in Ayyavazhi tradition not as an ordinary death, but as the completion of the divine incarnation and the return of the Supreme Divine to Vaikundam.

Following his return, Narayana is described as receiving Vaikundar in Vaikundam and bestowing upon him the honours appropriate to his divine status. The Ayyavazhi tradition further describes the subsequent preparation for the establishment of Dharma Yuga and the eventual transformation of the world following the destruction of Kali.

The completion of Vaikundar's incarnation therefore marks, in Ayyavazhi theology, the transition from the mission of overcoming Kali to the future establishment of Dharma. The nature of Dharma Yuga, the role of the Santror, and the spiritual order that is to prevail in the coming age are further described in Akilathirattu Ammanai.

== Dharma Yuga ==
According to Ayyavazhi tradition, the establishment of Dharma Yuga represents the ultimate fulfilment of the divine mission of Ayya Vaikundar. As people throughout the world increasingly follow Ayya Vazhi and turn towards Ayya Vaikundar, the spiritual transformation of humanity reaches its culmination. The Jivatmas, having overcome the bondage of Kali, are ultimately united with the Paramatma.

In this transformation, Kali is completely destroyed and the age of Dharma emerges. Dharma Yuga is described as an age in which Ayya Vaikundar reigns as the divine sovereign. All people are regarded as belonging to one united spiritual family, with no distinctions based on caste, status, language or social divisions. The inequalities and divisions that characterized the age of Kali are understood to have disappeared.

The rule of Ayya Vaikundar in Dharma Yuga is symbolically expressed through the principle of "one word, one language and one flag." This signifies the unity of humanity under a single divine order and the establishment of Dharma throughout the world. Ayya Vaikundar is understood as the supreme ruler of this Dharma Yuga, while all people share equally in its spiritual and divine order.

The Ayyavazhi tradition further describes Dharma Yuga as a state of supreme spiritual bliss. Human beings attain a transformed and luminous existence, described as possessing light bodies, remaining in a state comparable to the age of sixteen, and attaining higher spiritual knowledge and the Jnana eye, enabling them to perceive the Divine directly. The people experience an exalted state of spiritual realization and live in harmony with one another and with the Supreme Divine.

In Dharma Yuga, therefore, humanity is described as attaining freedom from the limitations, inequalities and suffering associated with Kali. All Jivatmas live in spiritual unity and experience divine bliss, while Ayya Vaikundar remains present as the supreme divine ruler. The age is thus portrayed as the fulfilment of Dharma, in which the Divine is directly experienced and humanity enters an enduring state of righteousness, equality, knowledge and spiritual bliss.

According to Akilathirattu Ammanai, this is the ultimate destiny towards which the incarnation and mission of Ayya Vaikundar are directed: the destruction of Kali, the restoration of Dharma, the spiritual liberation of the Jivatmas, and the establishment of a divine order in which humanity lives in unity under Ayya Vaikundar.
