= Nizhal Thangal, Attoor =

Coordinates: 8.327777°N 77.261008°E

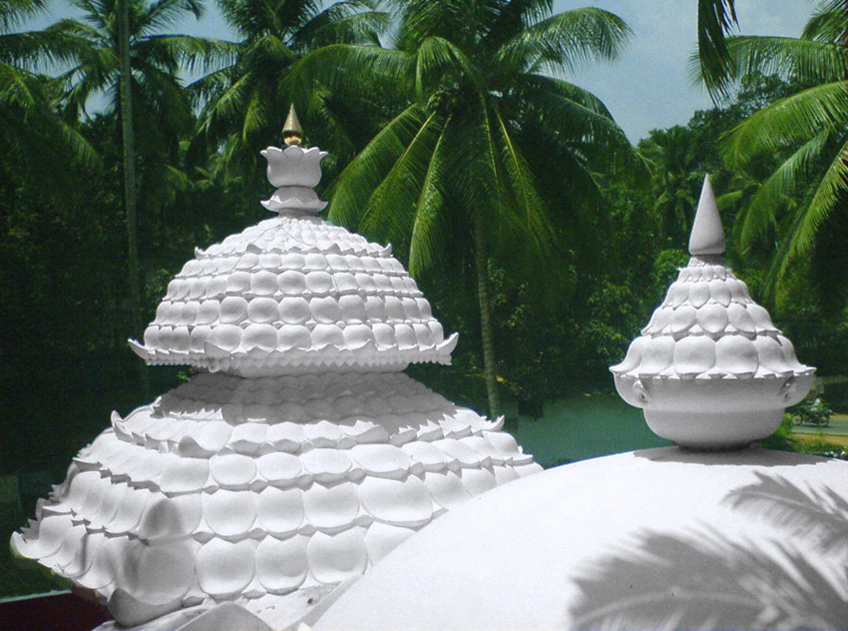
Thiru Nizhal Thangal of Attoor.

The Nizhal Thangal, Attoor is one among the few renowned Worship centers of Ayyavazhi in the western Kanyakumari. It is also the second Thangal built in the Thamarai Thangal series only after the Nizhal Thangal of Nelli-ninra Vilai, and the first ever Temple built with the Sahasrara architecture.

It is located at Attoor near Thiruvattar in SH-90, 5 km (3.1 mi) North-east of Marthandam and 25 km (16 mi) North-west of Nagercoil, midway between Marthandam and Kulasekaram. Though this Thangal was built in 1988, the new structure with Sahasrara architecture was built recently. The foundation stone for the new structure was laid in 2005 by Bala Prajapathi Adikalar and was inaugurated by him on 23 April 2007.

== Festivals ==
Thiru Edu-Vasippu is the main festival conducted here. The festival includes a celebration for 10 days starting from the second Friday of the Tamil month of Chithirai (April/May) every year. The 15141 verses of holy text Akilathirattu Ammanai is ceremonially recited during the 10 festival days. Religious conferences is also held every year.

Ayya Vaikunda Avataram is the second most popular festival which is held usually on the 18th of the Tamil month of Masi. Special Panividais are conducted and Annual celebration of the Akila-Ara Patasalai (spiritual schools) are held along with the Masi Celebration. Other festivals including Thirukkarthigai, Diwali etc. are also celebrated with high fervor.

== See also ==
- Nizhal Thangal
- Worship centers of Ayyavazhi
- List of Ayyavazhi-related articles
- Vaikunda Chella Pathi
