= Vetturnimadam =

- Neighbourhood
- Vetturnimadam, Kanyakumari (Tamil Nadu)
- Coordinates: 8.190000°N 77.421100°E
- Country: India
- State: Tamil Nadu
- Elevation: 79 m (259 ft)

Languages
  - Official: Tamil, English
  - Speech: Tamil, English
- Time zone: UTC+5:30 (IST)
- PIN: 629003
- Telephone Code: +914652xxxxxx
- Vehicle registration: TN-74 yy xxxx
- Neighbourhoods: Nagercoil, Kottar, Vadasery, Parvathipuram and Krishnancoil
- Corporation: Nagercoil Municipal Corporation
- District Collector: P. N. Sridhar, I. A. S.
- LS: Kanniyakumari Lok Sabha constituency
- MP: Vijay Vasanth
- Website: https://kanniyakumari.nic.in

Vetturnimadam is a neighbourhood in Kanyakumari district of Tamil Nadu state in the peninsular India.

Vetturnimadam is located at an altitude of about 79 m above the mean sea level with the geographical coordinates of 8.190000°N 77.421100°E (i.e., 8°11'24.0"N, 77°25'16.0"E).Nagercoil, Kottar, Vadasery, Parvathipuram and Krishnancoil are some of the important neighbourhoods of Vetturnimadam.

A Higher Secondary School viz., The Salvation Army Higher Secondary School is located in Vetturnimadam. An Arts and Science College viz., Pioneer Kumaraswamy College which is affiliated to Manonmaniam Sundaranar University, is situated in Vetturnimadam.

Christ the King church is one of the churches in Vetturnimadam. The Salvation Army Booth Tucker Memorial church is one more church situated in Vetturnimadam.

Nagercoil Town railway station is located nearer to Vetturnimadam and the distance between Vetturnimadam and the railway station is 1.7 km (Refer Google Maps).
