= Devasahayam Pillai =

Indian martyr and Saint

Saint Devasahayam Pillai
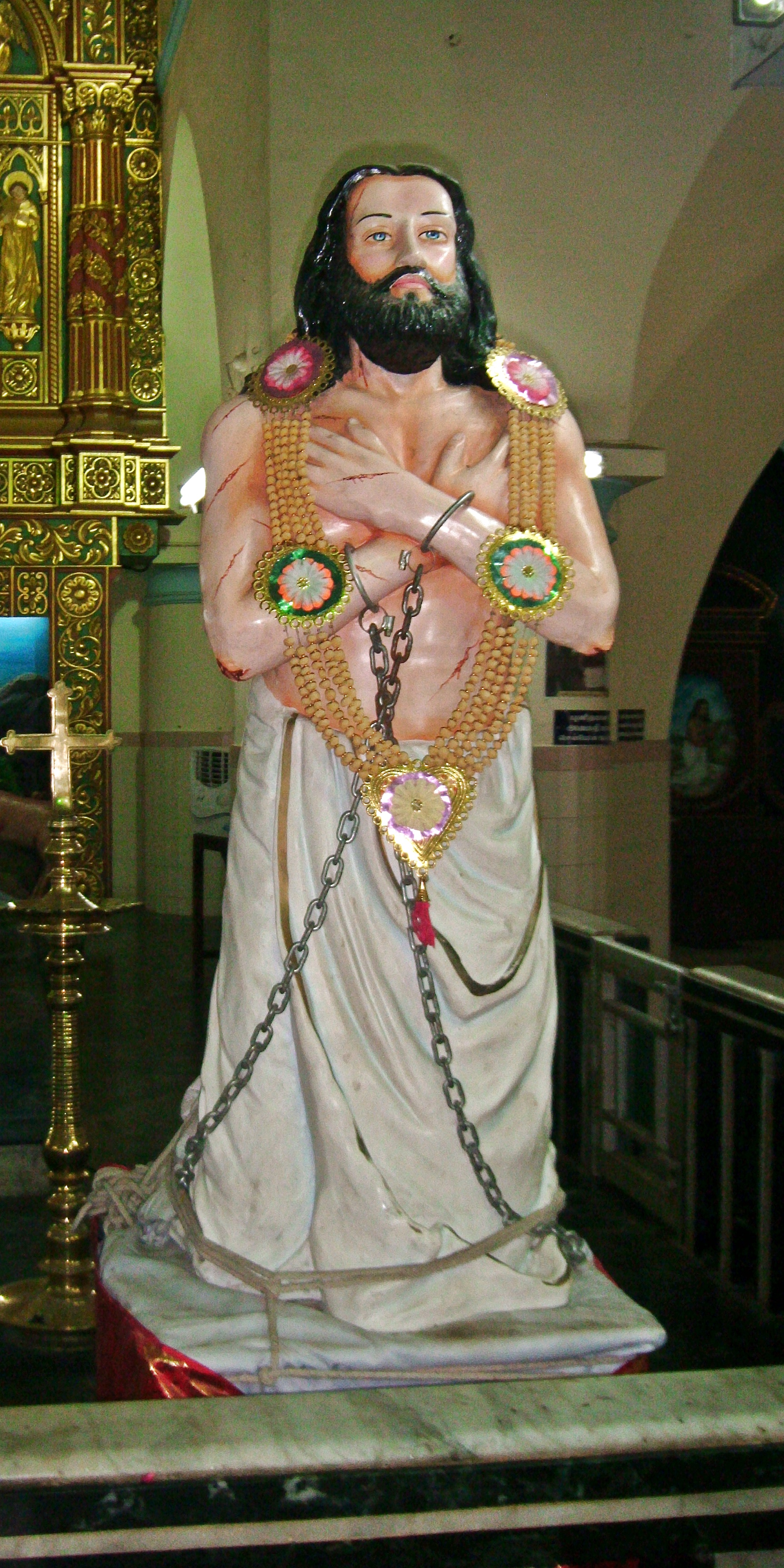
- Statue of Devasahayam Pillai at St. Francis Xavier's Cathedral, Kottar

Martyr
- Born: Neelakanta Pillai; 23 April 1712; Nattalam, Kingdom of Travancore
- Died: 14 January 1752 (aged 39); Aralvaimozhy, Kingdom of Travancore
- Resting place: Kottar, Nagercoil, India
- Venerated in: Catholic Church
- Beatified: 2 December 2012, St. Francis Xavier's Cathedral, Kottar, Nagercoil, Tamil Nadu, India by Angelo Amato (on behalf of Pope Benedict XVI)
- Canonized: 15 May 2022, Saint Peter's Square, Vatican City by Pope Francis
- Major shrine: St. Francis Xavier's Cathedral, Kottar, Nagercoil, Tamil Nadu, India
- Feast: 14 January
- Attributes: Tied up in chains; Praying on knees before execution
- Patronage: India; Persecuted Christians

'Devasahayam Pillai’ (born Neelakanta Pillai and baptized as Lazarus; 23 April 1712 – 14 January 1752) was an Indian layman and martyr of the Catholic Church. He was canonized as a saint of the church by Pope Francis on 15 May 2022.

== Early life ==
Neelakandan Pillai was born into an affluent Hindu Nair family in Nattalam, Travancore, old Kerala (present-day Kanyakumari District) on 23 April 1712. His father, Vasudevan Namboodiri, who was from Kayamkulam (present-day Kerala state), was a priest at the Adikesava Perumal Temple in Thiruvattar, Travancore, old Kerala (present-day Kanyakumari district of neighbouring Tamil Nadu.) Neelakandan's mother, Devaki Amma, hailed from Thiruvattar, Travancore. In accordance with the matrilineal tradition of the day, he was raised by his maternal uncle rather than his father. His father taught him Sanskrit and Vedanta.

Neelakandan's family had much influence in the royal palace of Maharaja Marthanda Varma, king of Travancore, and Neelakandan went into the service of the royal palace as a young man. His capabilities and enthusiasm did not go unnoticed in the palace, as he was soon put in charge of state affairs as an official under Ramayyan Dalawa, the Dewan of Travancore.

== Conversion to Christianity ==
In 1741, Captain Eustachius De Lannoy, a Dutch naval commander, was sent on command of a naval expedition by the Dutch East India Company with the objective of capturing and establishing a trading port at Colachel, a port under the control of Travancore. In the ensuing Battle of Colachel, fought between the Travancore forces and the Dutch, the Dutch were defeated. De Lannoy's men were either killed or captured. Eustachius De Lannoy and his assistant Donadi surrendered and were imprisoned.

De Lannoy and the Dutchmen were later pardoned by the king, on condition that they serve in the Travancore army. In the course of time, De Lannoy earned the trust of the king and went on to become the commander of the Travancore army, the very forces that had earlier defeated him. He trained the Travancore forces on European lines and introduced new weaponry and gunpowder. As military commander, he won many battles for Travancore, resulting in the annexation of various neighbouring territories to Travancore.

It was during their influential roles under the King of Travancore that Devasahayam Pillai and De Lannoy became well acquainted. De Lannoy's Christian faith interested Devasahayam; thus, De Lannoy enlightened him on the faith, leading to Devasahayam Pillai's conversion in 1745. At this point, he took the name "Devasahayam" ("help of God"), which is the translation into Malayalam of the name 'Lazarus.'

== Baptism ==
On Devasahayam's acceptance of the Christian faith, he was baptized at the Roman Catholic sub-parish church at the Vadakkankulam village (in the present-day Tirunelveli District of Tamil Nadu), where the Jesuits had a mission under the Rev. Fr. R. Bouttari Italus S.J. Neelakanda Pillai, his name at birth, was then changed to "Lazar", although he is more widely known by the Tamil and Malayalam translation Devasahayam (meaning God's help). Pillai was married by this time to Bhargavi Ammal from Kunchu Veedu, Elanthavilai, Mayicode in Travancore State. She was baptised alongside her husband as a matter of course. She was given the baptismal name "Gnanapoo Ammaal" ("Flower of Knowledge", equivalent to Theresa in Tamil and Malayalam). Fearing reprisal in her native Travancore against her religious conversion, she chose to become a migrant-resident of Vadakkankulam village. Some other members of Devasahayam Pillai's immediate family also later received baptism.

== Orders based on accusations and charges ==
Church chroniclers say that the Brahmin chief priest of the kingdom, the feudal lords, members of the royal household and the Nair community brought false charges on Devasahayam to the Dewan, Ramayyan Dalawa. The allegations were leaving Hinduism and stop following Hindu beliefs. Leaving Hinduism was considered a great offense in those days, especially for Pillai, which is the highest caste of Nairs in Kerala. This resulted in severe consequences, such as the divestment of one's portfolio in the Travancore administration and even arrest. He remained in prison for three years, during which time the king of Travancore came under tremendous pressure from the Europeans seeking his release. Orders were finally passed for him to go into exile. He was initially ordered to be seated backward on a buffalo (a public humiliation) and paraded to the Kuzhumaikkad border, where he would be released and could enter into Dutch-controlled territory (or citadel/fortress used for trade and shipping). The original Royal order was later altered, and Devasahayam was taken on the back of a buffalo to Aralvaimozhy border (much closer to the capital, Padmanabhapuram), where he was tortured by ten different karyakkars (Royal officers), on the advice of the ministers, before being released into a mountainous forest area, on the other side of which was the kingdom of the Pandya kings, traditional rivals of Travancore.

== Other traditions and beliefs ==
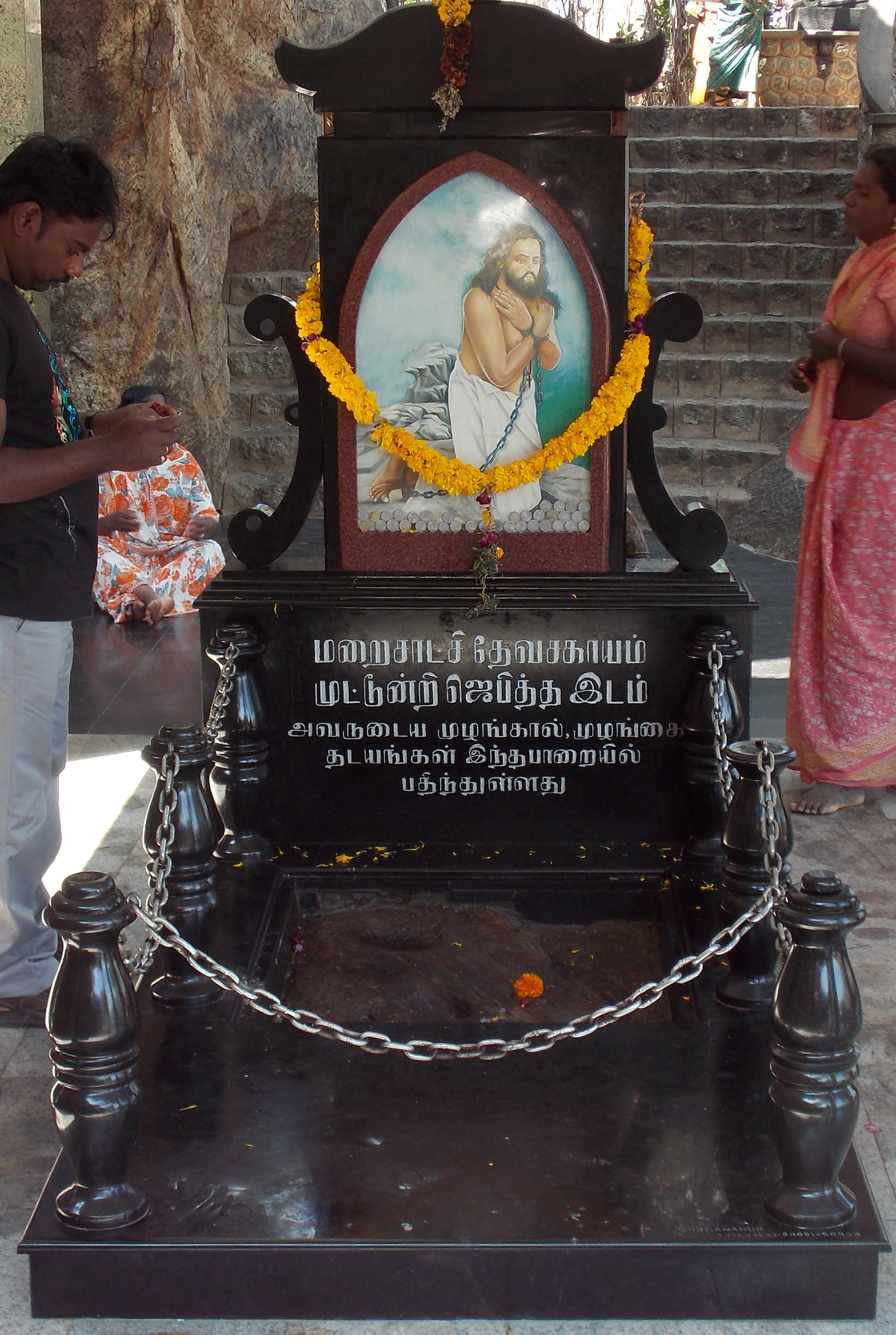
Devasahayam is believed to have prayed on this rock and left imprints of his knee and elbow

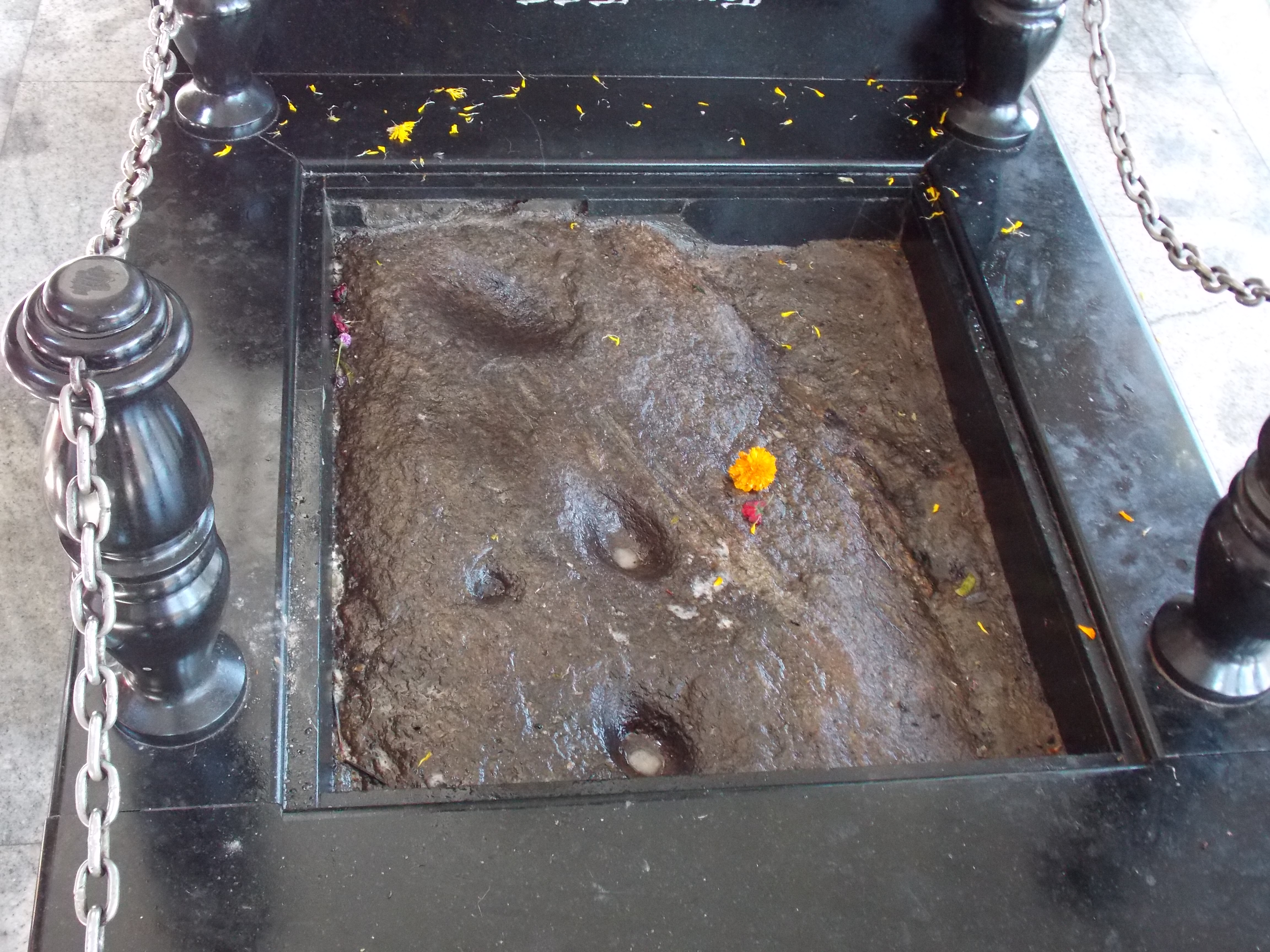
A closer look of the rock where Devasahayam is believed to have prayed and left imprints of his knee and elbow

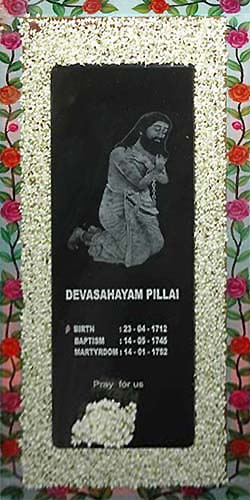
Tomb of Devasahayam Pillai - St. Xavier's Cathedral, diocese of Kottar

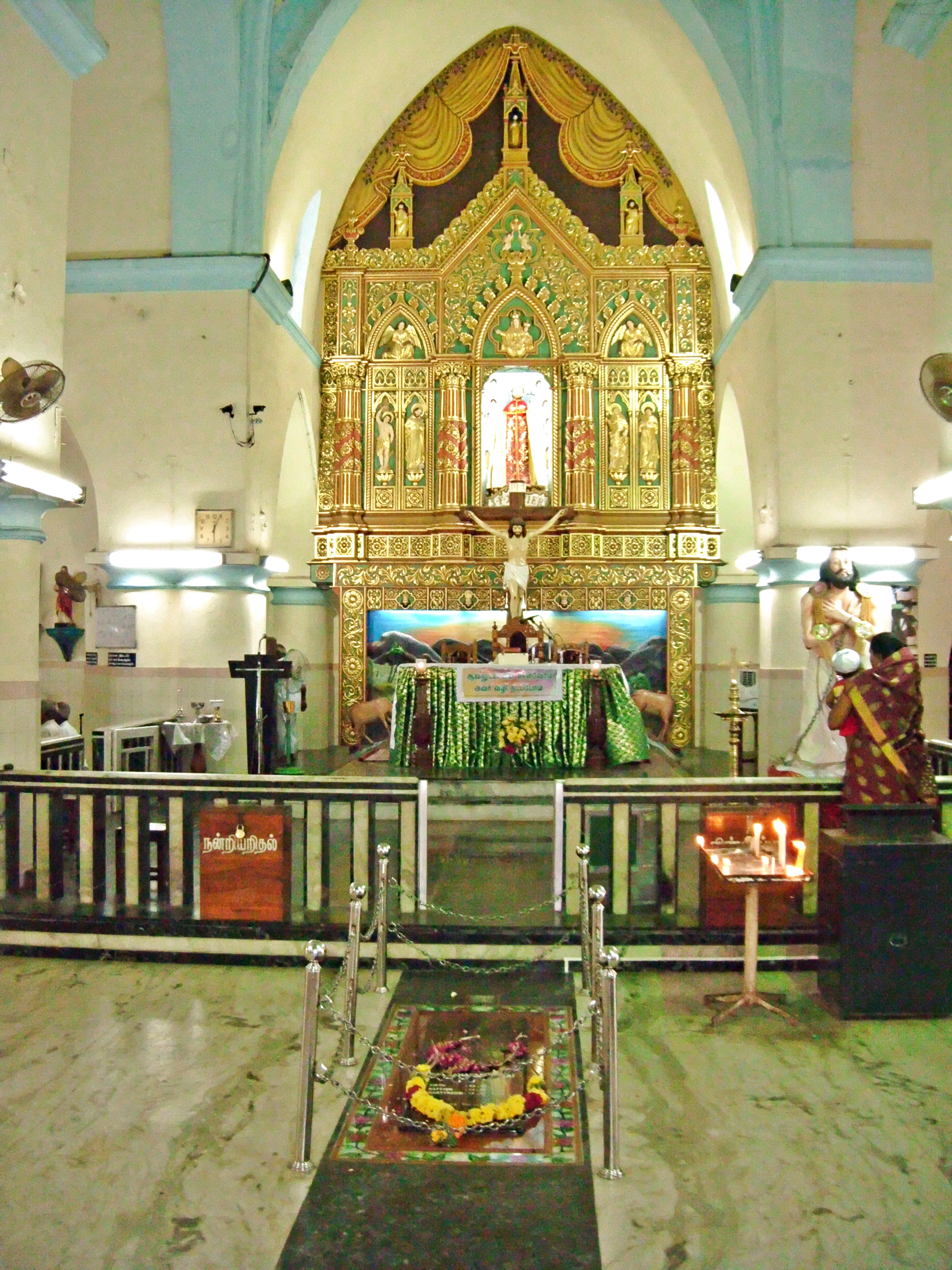
Tomb in front of the main-altar of St. Francis Xavier's Cathedral, Kottar, Nagercoil

Devasahayam Pillai was marched from Padmanabhapuram Palace to Aralvaimozhy by soldiers, over the period of a few days. Pillai was treated like a criminal and as was customary in those days for criminals, his body was painted with red and black spots, and was intentionally marched through populated areas, sitting backward on top of a water buffalo (the mythical vehicle or vahana of Yama, the lord of death in Hinduism) through the streets of South Travancore. As a method of torture, he was beaten every day with eighty stripes, pepper rubbed in his wounds and nostrils, exposed to the sun, and given only stagnant water to drink.

While halting at Puliyoorkurichi, not far away from the Padmanabhapuram Palace of the Travancore king, it is believed by Christians that God quenched his thirst by letting water gush through a small hole on a rock, on the very place where he knelt to pray. The water hole is still found in the compound of a church at Puliyoorkurichi, about 15 km from Nagercoil.

It is also believed that the leaves of a neem (Margosa) tree in the village of Peruvilai, to which he had been tied while being marched to Aralvaimozhy, cured illnesses of sick people in the village and around. Many more miracles are attributed to Devasahayam Pillai.

== Death ==
In 1752, the original order of the King and his Dewan was to deport him from Travancore, into the Pandya country, at Aralvaimozhy. He was let off in the forested hills near Aralvaimozhy. There, he is believed to have begun deep meditations, and the people from the adjacent villages began visiting the holy man. Christian sources allege that at this time, high caste Hindus plotted to do away with Devasahayam.

Some people believe that soldiers went up the forested hills and tried to shoot Devasahayam, but were unable to fire; after which he took the gun in his hands, blessed it and gave it back to the soldiers to shoot him to death, if they wished to. The soldiers took the gun back and fired at him five times. His body was then carelessly thrown out near the foothills at Kattadimalai.

It was at Kattadimalai in Kanyakumari district that Devasahayam Pillai died on 14 January 1752. Pillai's body was later recovered by some people of the region and carried to the church at Kottar, in present-day Nagercoil. It was buried near the altar inside St. Xavier's Church, Kottar, Nagercoil, which is now the diocesan Cathedral.

Since the days of the interment of the mortal remains of Devasahayam Pillai, many Christian pilgrims have visited his tomb and offered prayers.

== Canonization process ==
In 2004, at the request of the Diocese of Kottar, the Tamil Nadu Bishops' Council (TNBC) and the Conference of Catholic Bishops of India (CCBI) recommended Pillai for the process of beatification. Some Hindu organizations objected to this initiative, claiming that there is no evidence of religious persecution in Travancore during the given period, and that Pillai was executed for sedition. However, documents dating back to the period encompassing Pillai's lifetime show that religious conversion of court officials to Christianity was not tolerated.

On 28 June 2012, Pope Benedict XVI authorized the Congregation for the Causes of Saints to promulgate a decree regarding the martyrdom of Pillai and he was granted the title "Venerable". On 2 December 2012, a ceremony of beatification and declaration of martyrdom was held in Nagercoil, in the Diocese of Kottar in Southern India, presided over by Cardinal Angelo Amato, Prefect of the Congregation for the Causes of Saints, acting as papal delegate. Pillai is the first Indian lay man who is not part of any religious institute to be elevated to the rank of "Blessed" (the step preceding the recognition of a person as a saint, as per the canon law of the Catholic Church).

On 21 February 2020, Pope Francis recognized a miracle attributed to the intercession of Devasahayam, clearing his way to canonization. He is the first Catholic in India who is neither an ordained minister nor a religious to be officially recognized as a saint. The Vatican announced on 9 November 2021 that Pope Francis would formally canonize him on 15 May 2022. On the fifth Sunday of the resurrection, 15 May 2022, the Pope raised Devasahayam Pillai to sainthood along with nine other candidates.

According to the report submitted by the then Bishop of Cochin (under whom the Kanyakumari church was then functioning) in 1756 AD the Christian martyrdom of Devasahayam Pillai was promptly intimated to the Vatican. Prominent witnesses to his saintliness and martyrdom include Paremmakkal Thoma Kathanar.

In 1780, Kariattil Ouseph Malpan submitted a petition to the Vatican for canonization of Devasahayam Pillai.

The church historian C. M. Agur concluded in 1903 that although apostasy was never considered illegal in Travancore, it was not viewed indifferently, particularly in the case of the King's palace servants, and this led to the martyrdom of Devasahayam Pillai.

In 1984, a group of lay persons from the diocese of Kottar, especially members of the Nagercoil Catholic Club, once again took the initiative to seek the beatification of Devasahayam. This is unusual for a layman, but he is regarded as one who was totally devoted to Christ. At the beginning of the 21st century, many Christian devotees were offering prayers at his tomb in St. Xavier's Cathedral at Kottar.

After a series of initiatives by the Roman Catholic diocese of Kottar and after much deliberation, the Conference of Catholic Bishops of India (CCBI) and the Tamil Nadu Bishops' Council (TNBC) duly recommended his beatification in the year 2004. This was done following scrutiny of available historical evidence. Bishop Chrysostom said that the CCBI did not intend any controversy whatsoever in moving this forward.

Professor A. Sreedhara Menon (1925–2010), a noted historian and writer on Travancore, said that no cases of persecution in the name of religious conversion were recorded in the history of the kingdom. P. Parameswaran, president of the Hindu spiritual organisation Vivekananda Kendra, accused the CCBI of an attempt to hurt Hindu sentiments. Referring to the Travancore state manual, he insisted that Devasahayam was a palace employee who was executed after confirmation of sedition, because he had tampered with palace records and passed them to De Lannoy.

However, Catholic records of the time state that the kingdom of Travancore did not tolerate palace officials converting to Christianity.

In June 2012, Pope Benedict XVI officially recognized a decree from the Congregation for the Causes of Saints stating that he lived a life of "heroic virtues" – a major step towards beatification – and Pillai was then referred to as "Venerable".

=== Beatification and declaration as a martyr ===
Devasahayam Pillai was declared a martyr and Blessed on 2 December 2012, at a solemn ceremony held in the Diocese of Kottar at Carmel Higher Secondary School Grounds, Nagercoil, near the place of his burial. The Prefect of the Congregation for the Causes of Saints, Angelo Cardinal Amato presided at the function as Delegate of Pope Benedict XVI.

Several cardinals, archbishops and bishops from India and elsewhere, as well as numerous priests, religious men and women and over 100,000 Catholics from all over India participated in the grand ceremony which included a Solemn Pontifical Mass.

Among the dignitaries officiating at the altar were Cardinal Angelo Amato, Cardinal Oswald Gracias (Archbishop of Mumbai), Cardinal Telesphore P. Toppo (Archbishop of Ranchi), Cardinal George Alencherry (Major Archbishop of Syro-Malabar Catholic Church), Baselios Cleemis (Major Archbishop of Syro-Malankara Catholic Church), Archbishop Salvatore Pennacchio (Apostolic Nuncio to India), and Bishop Peter Remigius (then Bishop of Kottar).

Devasahayam Pillai is the first lay person from India to be beatified by the Catholic Church.

On the same day as Devasahayam Pillai was declared a Blessed in the Diocese of Kottar, India, Pope Benedict XVI addressed the pilgrims gathered in Rome. During his Angelus Message the Pope mentioned the event in Italian and English. He said in Italian:

Today in Kottar, India, Devasahayam Pillai, a faithful layman, who lived in the 18th century and died a martyr, was proclaimed Blessed. Let us join in the joy of the Church in India and pray that this newly Beatified sustain the faith of the Christians of that great and noble country.

Then he addressed the crowds in English:

I welcome all gathered here today to pray with me. I especially greet the people of Kottar who celebrate today the beatification of Devasahayam Pillai. His witness to Christ is an example of that attentiveness to the coming of Christ recalled by this first Sunday of Advent. May this holy season help us to centre our lives once more on Christ, our hope. God bless all of you!

=== Canonization ===
On 21 February 2020, Pope Francis recognized a miracle attributed to the intercession of Devasahayam, clearing his way to canonization (sainthood). The Vatican announced on 9 November 2021 that the canonization ceremony would be held on 15 May 2022 and his canonization and that of eight others took place in St Peter's Square on that date. He is the first Indian layperson to be canonized.

== Places of interest ==
Devasahayam Pillai is buried in the Cathedral of St. Francis Xavier at Kottar in Nagercoil. Devasahayam's tomb was restored and beautified after the declaration of martyrdom and beatification.

Devasahyam Pillai's clothes and other belongings are kept in a church in the small town of Vadakkankulam in Tirunelveli District of Tamil Nadu State, India. They are exposed at the church on 15 August every year, the feast of the Assumption of Mary. His wife was buried in the cemetery there.

Puliyoorkurichi, location of the water fountain believed to have quenched Devasahayam's thirst, is on the Nagercoil–Trivandrum highway.

Aralvaimozhy, where Devasahayam was killed, is on the Nagercoil–Tirunelveli highway. At the spot on the hillock (called Kaattadimalai) where Devasahayam was killed, a rock makes bell-like sounds when knocked with a stone.

St. Devasahayam as a Patron of Laity in India

His Holiness Pope Leo XIV, through a Decree issued by the Dicastery for Divine Worship and the Discipline of the Sacraments on 16 July 2025, graciously recognized Saint Devasahayam as the Patron of the Laity in India. The aforementioned Decree solemnly affirmed that this patronage is endowed with full liturgical rights and privileges, in accordance with the norms of the Church.

This solemn declaration was formally promulgated within the context of the Eucharistic Celebration held on 14 January 2026 at the Shrine of Devasahayam Mount Parish.

== Controversy ==
M.G.S. Narayanan, former chairman of Indian Council of Historical Research (ICHR), has made the claim that he never came across any one named either Neelakantan Pillai or Devasahayam Pillai as the army chief of Martanda Varma in Kerala's history. However, sources such as "Paulinus a Sancto Bartholomaeo (1748-1806), Voyage to the East Indies, 1800" say the opposite.

== See also ==
- List of blesseds
- St. Antony Church in Chemmanvilai
