= Vaikunda Chella Pathi =

Coordinates: 8.335611°N 77.270889°E

Vaikunda Chella Pathi is one among the oldest Nizhal Thangals in the Western Kanyakumari district. It was located 6 km North-east of Marthandam midway between Marthandam and Kulasekaram at Thiruvattar. It is also the only Nizhal Thangal in the district to conduct three Thiru Eadu Vasippu festivals annually.

Nizhal Thangal at Attoor is located nearby.

== Legend ==
The land where the Thangal stood today was owned by Sankaran Thamby, Changumugam, Thiruvananthapuram until the 1940s. The legend goes that Chellan Samiyar, was a palmyra climber. He being a staunch devotee of lord vishnu, had set a pedestal at his hut and used it to offer his daily prayers. He was said to be instructed by Lord Narayana in his dream to construct a Temple. Samiyar, who was then a teenager, was unable to realise his dream as he had no land of his own. Disappointed by this, he appealed to Lord Narayanathat how he could construct a temple without any land. He was said to receive command to make all the arrangements and that the land would be made available when it was time.

Meanwhile, Sankaran Thamby received a dream the following day in which a Pandaram (mendicant) ordered Thamby to offer land for a Temple to Chellan Samiyar, whom he did not know. Though Thamby ignored the dream initially, after he and his mother received repeated dreams in the following days, he came to Thiruvattar to find the person to whom he was to donate the land. He found Samiyar and the land was donated in 1944. The current Temple was constructed in 1959 C.E. and inaugurated by Pattathu Ayya Krishnanama Mony.

== Festivals ==
The Thiru Eadu Vasippu is conducted during the Tamil Months of Vaikasi, Avani and Margazhi. The Vaikasi festival lasts 10 days while the Avani and Margazhi festivals last 3 days each.

== See also ==
- Nizhal Thangal
- Worship centers of Ayyavazhi
- List of Ayyavazhi-related articles
