= Nizhal Thangal, Nelli-ninra Vilai =

Coordinates: 8.327484°N 77.250650°E

The Nizhal thangal of Nelli-ninra Vilai is one among the few important Worship centers of Ayyavazhi in the western Kanyakumari. It is also the first Thangal built in the Thamarai Thangal series.

It was situated mid-way in the Attoor Arumanai road, 4 km northeast of Marthandam, and 26 km northwest of Nagercoil. Though this Thangal was originally built in 1882, the new structure with Lotus architecture was recently constructed. The foundation stone was laid on 2004 and was inaugurated by Bala Prajapathi Adikalar in April 2006.

== See also ==
- Nizhal Thangal
- Worship centers of Ayyavazhi
- List of Ayyavazhi-related articles
