= Ramanathichanputhur =

Ramanathichanputhur Manthavilai
- village
- Country: India
- State: Tamil Nadu
- District: Kanyakumari

Languages
  - Official: Tamil
- Time zone: UTC+5:30 (IST)
- Postal code: 629402

Ramanathichanputhur is a village situated near Marungoor in Kanyakumari District, Tamil Nadu.

== Geography ==
Three sides are surrounded by hills and ponds. Surrounded villages are North West Rajavoor, West Kumarapuram Thoppur, South Amaravathi villai and East Nedumalai hills. Ramanathichenputhoor surrounded by hills (Nedumallai-east, Kathadimallai-North and Perialkullam pond-West. Via Narithondu there is a short route to Pazhavoor (Trinelvelli). It is one of the east borders of Kanyakumari Dist.

== History ==
The village is divided based on a caste system: Vellalars in the north part and Nadars in the south part of the village.

Vellalars converted to Christianity during the 17th century from nearby villages like Marungoor, Iraviputhur, Theroor, etc., and for marriage purposes they get relationship with Vadakkankulam, North Rajavoor, Kuruvinatham villages, because those vellalars are already in the faith of Christianity. Both the communities (Nadar and vellalar) are Roman Catholic, though there is no inter marriage due to strong cast sensitivity.

A church for Lady of Lourdes was built during the 17th century, but for some unknown reason, that church was left as it is and a new church for St. Ignatius was constructed and made into the parish church. Now the Old church is renovated and an infant Jesus statue kept inside for worship.

The other part of this village is South Ramanathichanputhur blessed with Saint Roch (Arokianathar) Church attached to Ramanathichanputhur Parish.

Ramanathichenputhoor has 100% literacy.

== Education ==
There is a primary school named 'Little Flower School' in the village that also serves as a polling station.

A college named 'Lord Jegannath College of Education was established in the village in 2013.

== Demographics ==
The people are mostly Roman Catholics and this parish belongs to the Kottar Diocese.

Before the state re-organisation was done, this village was the east border of South Thiruvithangoor.
