= Kailasapuram Ayya Vaikundar Temple =

Hindu temple in Peruvilai, Tamil Nadu, India

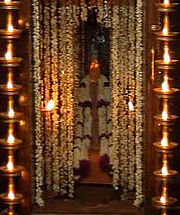
Kailasapuram Ayya Vaikundar temple.

The Kailasapuram Ayya Vaikundar Temple is a Hindu temple in Peruvilai village, Kailasapuram, Tamil Nadu, India. It is dedicated to Ayya Vaikundar (Ayya Vazhi), a manu Narayana avatar which arose from the sea and manifested in Mudisoodam Perumal (c. 1810 - c. 1857). In 1836, Ayya founded Samathva Samajam, a human rights movement which contributed to the Independence of India and was influenced by the development of socialism in Europe.

== Ayyavazhi mythology ==
In 1836, Ayya Vaikundar, a member of the Hindu lower class, wanted to pull the temple chariot, a task traditionally reserved for the elite. This angered and frightened the members of the upper class. King Swathi Thirunal, who was temporarily residing at Suchindram (4 miles (6.4 km) away), had Ayya arrested and led away, tied to a horse. In Swamithoppu, where the arrest took place, Ayya's followers objected but he advised them to remain patient. He said,

"Let them learn who I am and I will be back to you without any harm."

Ayya was brought before the king and answered the king's questions put to him with wisdom. However, when the king asked Ayya to guess the item in his right hand, Ayya dismissed the king, saying everyone's soul was of the same value because the universe was created by one god. The king was angered and condemned Ayya to fifteen months imprisonment in Thiruvananthapuram and further incarceration from November 1838 in Singarathoppu. Despite all sorts of torture such as brutality or poisoning, being made to walk through fire or being burnt in a lime kiln, being fumigated with burning chillies or being publicly taunted with a hungry tiger, Ayya maintained his composure and appeared showered with flowers. When a guard poked the tiger with a spear, the animal grabbed the spear then suddenly let it go. In the incident, the spear hit a Brahmin chieftain who died of his injury.

The king offered to release Ayya if he agreed to remain within his caste but Ayya refused, saying he had no caste. He also refused to leave jail until he was ready. This news spread Thiruvananthapuram and throughout India. People came before him in large groups with fruits, flowers, and other gifts. His followers were from parts of south Tamil Nadu.

On the 19th day of the Tamil month of Masi (3 March 1839), Ayya returned to Swamithoppu Pathi. Ayya and his followers reached Awamithoppu on the 20th day of Masi, now an auspicious day amongst Ayya's devotees celebrated with a procession and a public holiday in south Tamil Nadu.

== See also ==
- Tamil’s architecture
- List of temples of Tamil Nadu
