= S. A. Raja =

Indian educationist (1937–2013)

S.A.Raja (alias) Selvam Arulraja
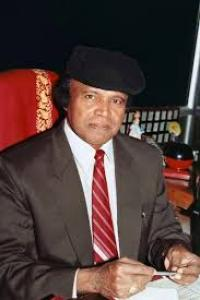
- Born: 14 August 1937; Ramanathichanputhur, Kanyakumari, Tamil Nadu, India
- Died: 3 January 2013 (aged 75); Vadakkankulam, Tirunelveli, Tamil Nadu, India
- Occupations: Educationist, Philanthropist
- Spouse: Sophia Raja
- Children: Johnsel Raja, Joe Suresh, Joy Raja, Jacob Raja, Jesus Raja
- Parent(s): Selvam Pillai and Soosaiammal
- Website: www.rajas.edu

Selvam Arulraja (August 14, 1937 – January 3, 2013), popularly known as S.A. Raja, was an educationist and philanthropist who founded several educational institutions in his native village of Vadakkankulam in South India and other places in India.

S.A. Raja served the Indian Armed Forces, received engineering and management education while serving the military, became an entrepreneur after his retirement, succeeded in civil construction business in Saudi Arabia and returned to India and established educational institutions.

== Personal life ==
S.A. Raja was born in Ramanathichanputhur of Kanyakumari district on August 14, 1937 to Selvam Pillai and Soosaiammal. His father inherited a textile shop from his grandfather Arulappa Pillai who ran a successful store in the village of Vadakkankulam in Tirunelveli district, Tamil Nadu.

He married Margaret Sophia of Kottayam on August 27, 1964. The couple have four sons, Johnsel Raja, Joy Raja, Jacob Raja and Jesus Raja and one daughter, Joe Suresh. He died at his home at 3 am on January 3, 2013.

== Education ==
S.A. Raja studied up to high school in St. Theresa’s in the Vadakkankulam village. While in the military he taught himself technical education.

== Career ==
S.A. Raja joined the Indian Armed Forces in January 1956, initially in the Indian Army and in 1957 the Indian Air Force. He served in various military posts including Jammu and Kashmir, Chandigarh and Chennai. He participated in the Sino-Indian War of 1962 and in the Indo-Pakistani War of 1965. While being in the Armed Forces, he educated himself in engineering disciplines.

After he retired from the armed forces in 1970, he returned to his native village Vadakkankulam and tried unsuccessfully to start up a few businesses. He had also joined the Indian National Congress Party but ran unsuccessfully as an independent candidate in the Thiruchendur parliamentary constituency in 1977. He took a civil engineering job in a Saudi Arabian firm shortly thereafter and started human resource services for the booming construction enterprise in Saudi Arabia.

S.A. Raja returned to Vadakkankulam in 1984 and invested in a spinning mill. In 1984, he also started a polytechnic college when the state of Tamil Nadu liberalized technical education and allowed self-funding technical institutions in the state. Subsequently, he established several colleges of engineering, dentistry, nursing, pharmacy, medicine, arts and science, and schools and remained the Chairman of the Rajas Group of Institutions till his death.

== Educational institutions ==
Following institutions were founded by Dr S.A. Raja through various charitable and educational trusts formed by him.

- S.A Raja Polytechnic College, Vadakkangulam (founded in 1984)
- The Indian Engineering College, Vadakkangulam (founded in 1984)
- S.A Raja Pharmacy College, Vadakkangulam (founded in 1987)
- Rajas Dental College & Hospital, Vadakkangulam (founded in 1987)
- Jayamatha Engineering College, Aralvaimozhi (founded in 1995)
- Sardar Raja Arts and Science College, Vadakkangulam (founded in 1998)
- Sardar Raja College of Engineering, Alangulam (founded in 2000)
- Joe Suresh Engineering College, Mundradaippu (founded in 2001)
- S.A. Raja B.Ed College, Vadakkangulam, (founded in 2006)
- Sophia Dental College, Trichy (founded in 2006)
- Indian Polytechnic College, Vadakkangulam (founded in 2007)
- The Kevin Polytechnic College, Mundradaippu (founded in 2008)
- Sardar Raja Medical College & Hospital, Kalahandi, Orissa (founded in 2012)

== Honors and awards ==
- Kalvi Thanthai
- Sardar

== Controversy ==
Aladi Aruna, a former minister of Tamil Nadu, was murdered by a gang on December 31, 2004 in the native village of Aruna. S.A. Raja was arrested on January 30, 2005 and charged as a conspirator in the murder. The arrest was claimed to be based on the dying declaration of the gang’s leader, but it was subsequently shown that the gang leader had prior personal enmity with the ex-minister and was not in danger of dying when the confession was extracted from him. The district court acquitted S.A. Raja on April 15, 2008. The High Court reversed the verdict on August 5, 2009. The Supreme Court of India acquitted him on July 30, 2010, writing that the high court had glossed over several important facts in convicting S.A. Raja, the Supreme Court said that the prosecution could not establish that the accused was guilty and released S.A. Raja.
