= Vaikunda Malai =

Coordinates: 8.199141°N 77.493186°E

The Vaikunda Malai (Tamil:வைகுண்ட மலை) is a hill that is part of the Mahendragiri Hills situated near Athala vilai of Kanyakumari district in the Western Ghats of India. This hill has religious importance in the Ayyavazhi religion during the festival of Ayya Vaikunda Avataram, the day of incarnation of Ayya Vaikundar.

During the celebration, two processions, one from Thiruvananthapuram and other from Tiruchendur, reach Athala vilai and circle the hill. A Jyothi (flame) is lit at the top of this hill to symbolise the birth of Vaikundar.

Unlike other Ayyavazhi holy places, Vaikunda Malai is not mentioned in the Ayyavazhi scriptures.

== See also ==
- Ayyavazhi holy sites
- Pancha pathi
- Nizhal Thangals
