= Nizhal Thangal of Kadambankulam =

This Thangal of Kadambankulam was the sixth among the Primary Nizhal Thangals of Ayyavazhi. This Thangal was situated South to Valliyoor, 2 km southeast to Kalantha Panai. This was the place where Thavam petral, the daughter of Dharma Citar was married to a man from here. Also, this was the native place of Thuvayal Pandaram, who were the participants of the Thuvayal Thavasu. Ayya Vaikundar also visited this place before his Six-year Tavam. Likewise, this place gains so much importance from Ayyavazhi.

As usual, the devotees of this village requested Ayya for a visit. Accepting it Ayya was carried there in a horse-drawn cart. During the Kadambankulam visit of Vaikundar, it was the 17th incarnational day of Vaikundar. So people celebrated the festival very grandly with their houses white-washed and palm-leaf roofed sheds constructed. The foundation stone for the sixth Thangal was laid.

A structure was erected there immediately using palmyra leaves. Then it was replaced with massive structures. Also, the rope used for hoisting the flag during the three Kodiyettru Thirunal in Swamithope is being donated continuously from Kadambankulam.

== See also ==
- Pathi
- Nizhal Thangal
- Worship centers of Ayyavazhi
