= Parvatha Ucchi Malai =

The Parvatha Ucchi Malai is a mythical mountain believed to be near Ayotha Amirtha Gangai as per Akilathirattu Ammanai the source of Ayyavazhi mythology.

As per the tradition after the Krishna Avatar the Avatara Chatam (body taken for the avatar) of Vishnu was placed in this mountain. There was also claims that it was Marunthuvazh Malai so stated in Akilathirattu.
