= Marungoor =

Marungoor Marungur
- Town
- Location in Tamil Nadu, India
- Coordinates: 8°11′05″N 77°30′20″E
- Country: India
- State: Tamil Nadu
- District: Kanniyakumari

Population (2001)
  - Total: 10,096

Languages
  - Official: Tamil
- Time zone: UTC+5:30 (IST)

Marungoor, also spelt Marungur, is a panchayat town near Suchindrum in Kanniyakumari district in the Indian state of Tamil Nadu. The place has an area of about 10 km^{2}.

The Subramania Swamy Temple, which is situated atop a small hillock is located here This temple area is called as Kumarapuram thoppur. Shashti and Soora Samharam are the famous festivals at this temple. The famous kandhashashti kavasam festival is very popular here and it is celebrated as a major festival.

The villages of Eraviputhoor and Nallur are situated in the west and Mylaudy in the south-east. In the east is Ramanathichanputhur village and in the north is Rajavoor village. Suchindram is about five km south-west of Marungoor. Suchindram Kulam, Suchindrum Temple, Thovalai, Kanyakumari and Vattakottai are nearby tourist spots. Thiruvananthapuram International Airport is the nearest airport. Marungoor can be reached from Kanyakumari, Nagercoil and Suchindram by bus.

== Population ==
As of 2001 India census, Marungur had a population of 10,096. Males constitute 49% of the population and females 51%. Marungur has an average literacy rate of 82%, higher than the national average of 59.5%: male literacy is 85%, and female literacy is 80%. In Marungur, 8% of the population is under 6 years of age.
