= Diocese of Kottar =

Roman Catholic diocese in Tamil Nadu, India

Diocese of Kottar Dioecesis Kottarensis கோட்டாறு மறைமாவட்டம்
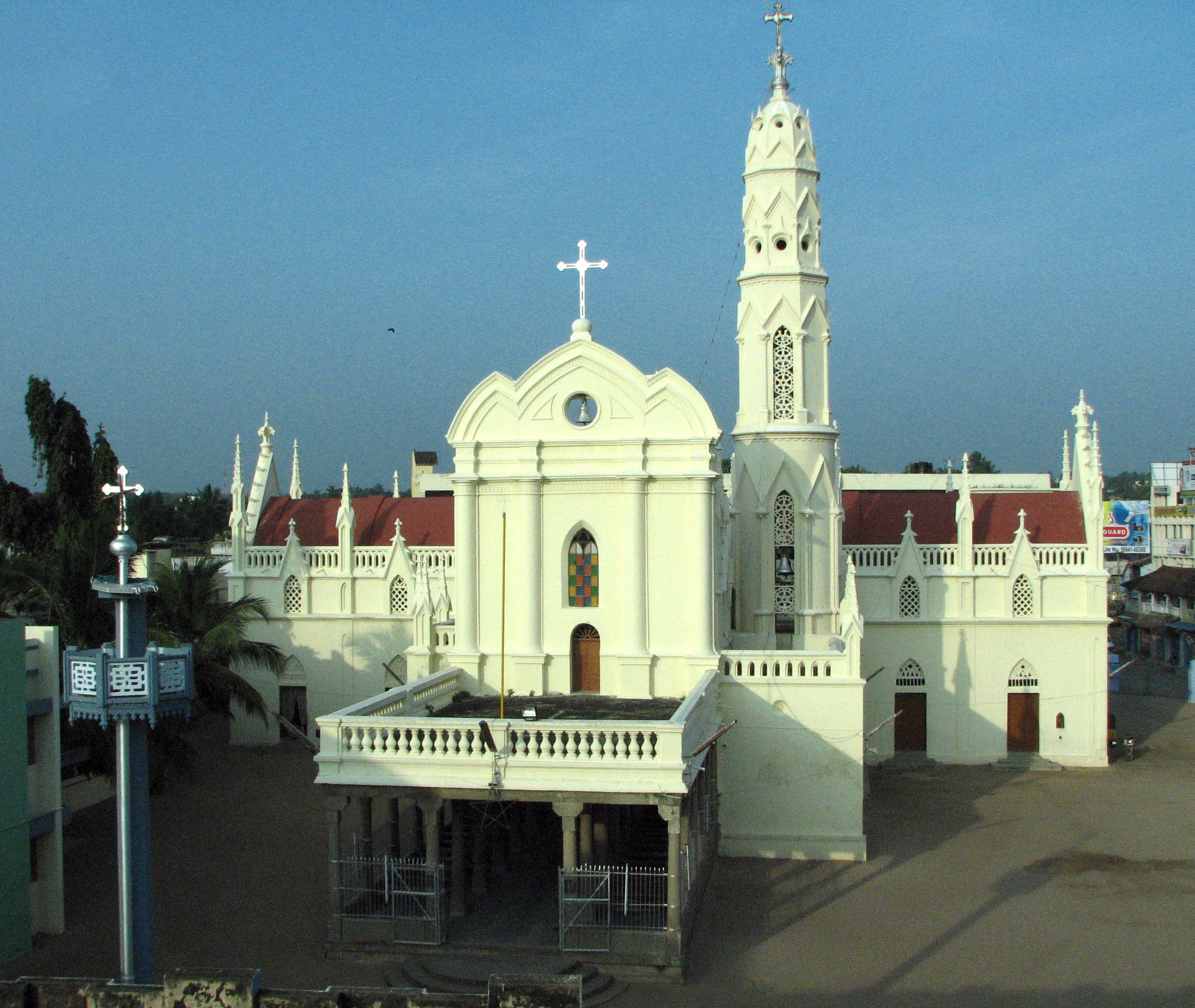
- Cathedral of St Francis Xavier, The Mother Church of the Diocese

Location
- Country: India
- Ecclesiastical province: Madurai
- Metropolitan: Madurai
- Coordinates: 8°11′00.9″N 77°24′42.7″E

Statistics
- Area: 715 km^{2} (276 sq mi)
- Population: Total; Catholics: (as of 2011); 734,354; 307,174 (41.8%)
- Parishes: 95

Information
- Denomination: Roman Catholic
- Rite: Latin Rite
- Established: 26 May 1930
- Cathedral: Cathedral of St Francis Xavier in Kottar
- Patron saint: St. Francis Xavier

Current leadership
- Pope: Leo XIV
- Bishop: Nazarene Soosai
- Metropolitan Archbishop: Antony Pappusamy
- Vicar General: Rev. Fr. Hillarius
- Bishops emeritus: Rev Peter Remigius

Website
- Official website

The Roman Catholic Diocese of Kottar (Latin: Kottaren(sis), Tamil: கோட்டாறு மறைமாவட்டம்) is a Latin Rite suffragan diocese in the ecclesiastical province of, Kottar, Kanyakumari District, southern India yet depends on the missionary Roman Congregation for the Evangelization of Peoples

Its episcopal see is Cathedral of St. Francis Xavier at Kottar in the town of Nagercoil, Tamil Nadu. It was built by St. Francis Xavier in 1544 AD, rebuilt in 1603 over the small chapel original chapel, expanded in both 1713 and 1806.

== Antecedents ==
The Kottar parish was a constituent of Malabar Vicariate since 1657 AD and came under Roman Catholic Archdiocese of Verapoly. Again it became the southern center of Diocese of Quilon at its erection in 1853 AD.

== Saints and causes for canonisation ==
- Devasahayam Pillai, a lay martyr of the Christian faith, was born (1712 AD) and martyred (1752 AD) here. His remains are buried in the cathedral of the diocese.

== History ==
- Established on 26 May 1930 as Diocese of Kottar / Kottaren(sis) (Latin), on territory split off from the Diocese of Quilon.
- Due to linguistic reasons as per reorganization of States, Kottar diocese was formally detached from the Metropolitan Archdiocese of Verapoly (in Kerala) and made suffragan of the Roman Catholic Archdiocese of Madurai (Tamil Nadu) instead in 1963.
- Lost territory on 2014.12.22 to establish the Diocese of Kuzhithurai.

== Episcopal ordinaries ==
Suffragan Bishops of Kottar

(all Roman Rite natives)

- ?Aloysius Benziger
- Lorenzo (Lawrence) Pereira (26 May 1930 – death 7 January 1938)
- Thomas Roch Agniswami, Society of Jesus (S.J.) (5 January 1939 – retired 23 November 1970), died 1974
- Marianus Arokiasamy (23 November 1970 – 3 July 1987), next Metropolitan Archbishop of Madurai (India) (1987.07.03 – retired 2003.03.22), also vice-president of Conference of Catholic Bishops of India (1991 – 1993 & 1994 – 1996), President of Conference of Catholic Bishops of India (1997 – 1999), died 2007
- Leon Augustine Tharmaraj (14 November 1988 – death 16 January 2007)
- Peter Remigius (30 June 2007 – retired 20 May 2017.05.20), previously Bishop of Kumbakonam (Tamil Nadu, India) (1989.11.10 – 2007.06.30)
- Nazarene Soosai (2017.05.20 – ...), nor previous prelature

== Statistics ==
As per 2017, it pastorally serves 307,104 Catholics on 750 km^{2} in 95 parishes with 243 priests (208 diocesan, 35 religious), 480 lay religious (35 brothers, 445 sisters) and 42 seminarians.

== See also ==
- List of Catholic dioceses in India

== Sources and external links ==
- Official website
- GCatholic, with Google satellite photo - data for all sections
