= Nizhal Thangal of Agastheeswaram =

This Thangal of Agastheeswaram was the second among the Primary Nizhal Thangals. This Thangal was constructed by Velandi Vathiyar of Agastheeswaram who was a friend of Sakadevan Citar, one among the five disciples of Vaikundar. He earned his name Vathiyar because he conducted platform-school to educate poor children. He along with other devotees, with carol songs, carries Ayya in a cradle to Agastheeswaram from Chettikudiyiruppu.

There Ayya blessed many people guilt-conscience who were once tried to scare and chase Vaikundar who was then on his 'Desa-sanjara' (travel from place to place). He also redeemed them using Patham and Namam. Then he laid stone for the second Thangal. Then a structure was raised there with palm-leaves and Ukappadippu and Ucchippadippu was conducted regularly. A man named 'Sukkirar' accepted that he will be in charge of lighting the lamp daily. So it was also called Sukkirar pathi.

== See also ==
- Pathi
- Nizhal Thangal
- Worship centers of Ayyavazhi
