= Nizhal Thangal of Vadalivilai =

This Thangal of Vadalivilai was the fifth among the Primary Nizhal Thangals. After the Kodiyettru Thirunal of Swamithope in 1850, the devotees of Ayya from Vadali vilai of Tirunelveli district requested Ayya to visit their village, during their holy visit to Swamithope. Accepting their request Ayya visited that village and laid stone for the Thangal there. Then a palmyra-leaf made structure was erected there and Panividais are conducted regularly.

== See also ==
- Pathi
- Nizhal Thangal
- Worship centers of Ayyavazhi
