= Nizhal Thangal of Paloor =

In South India, this Thangal of Paloor was the third among the Primary Nizhal Thangals. This Thangal was constructed by Mr. Perumal Nadar of Paloor who donated 43 palmyra trees for the famous Thaththuva-kottagai Project in Ambala Pathi.

This man requested Ayya to visit his village and as per Ayya visited Paloor. There with the instructions of Vaikundar, the third Thangal was constructed.

== See also ==
- Pathi
- Nizhal Thangal
- Worship centers of Ayyavazhi
