= Nizhal Thangal of Sundavilai =

Religious center

This Thangal of Sundavilai was the fourth among the Primary Nizhal Thangals. Very little information was known regarding the history of this thangal. The foundation stone for this Thangal was laid on 1849 in the Tamil month of margazhi.

== See also ==
- Pathi
- Nizhal Thangal
- Worship centers of Ayyavazhi
