= St. Francis Xavier's Cathedral, Kottar =

Roman Catholic Latin Rite shrine in Kottar, India

St. Francis Xavier's Cathedral
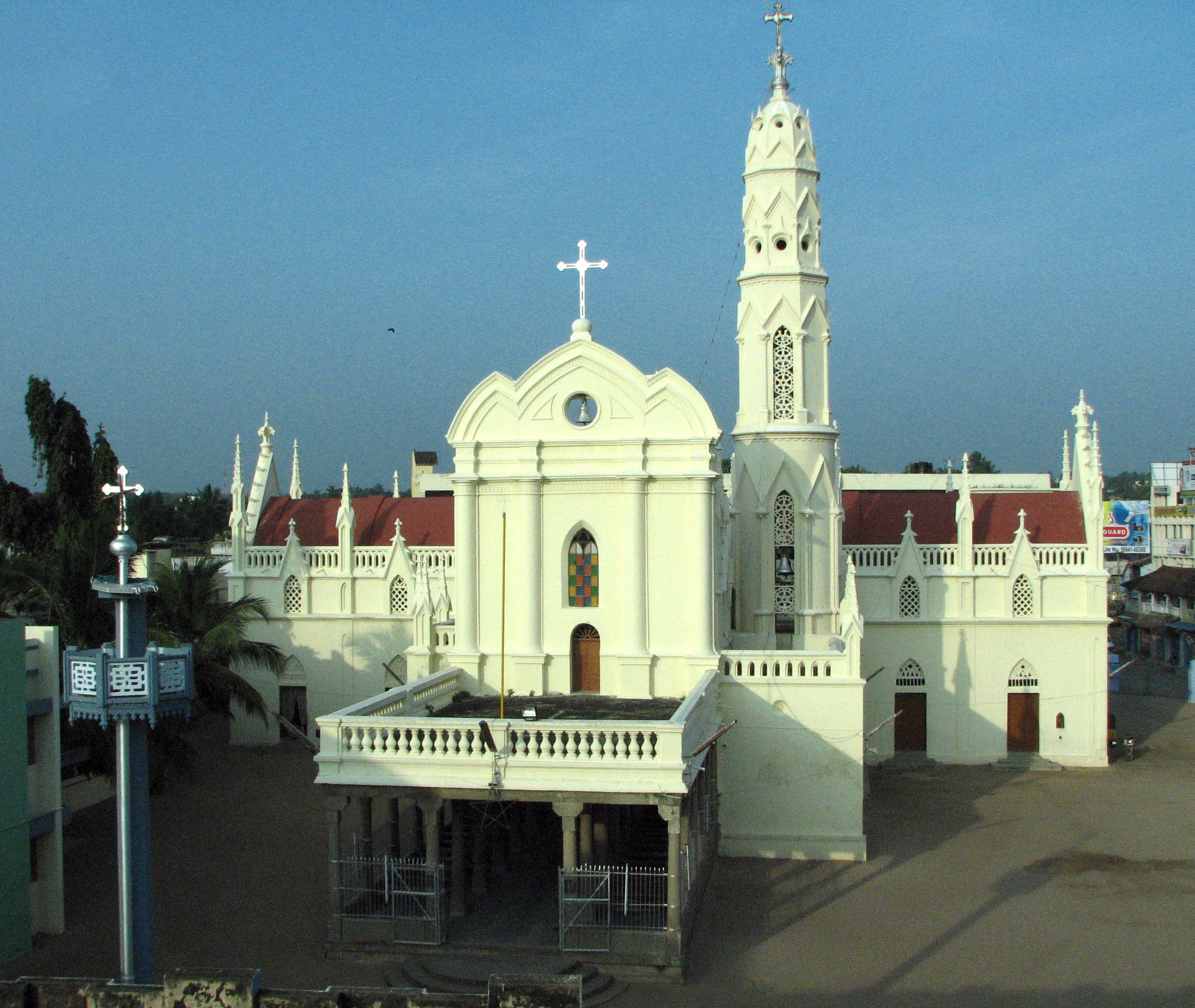

Religion
- Affiliation: Catholic Church
- District: Kanyakumari
- Rite: Roman Rite
- Ecclesiastical or organisational status: Cathedral
- Status: Active

Location
- Location: Kottar, Nagercoil, India
- State: Tamil Nadu
- Interactive map of St. Francis Xavier's Cathedral

Architecture
- Completed: 1600

St. Francis Xavier's Cathedral, Kottar, also known as St. Xavier Church, is a Roman Catholic Latin Rite shrine in Kottar, Nagercoil, in the Kanyakumari district of Tamil Nadu state, India. While Francis Xavier was doing missionary work in Kottar and its neighbourhood, he averted an invasion of Vadugas with the help of the army of Paravars and Padayatchi nadars of Kottar, at Vadasery, thus protecting the people of the Venad kingdom from that attack which was appreciated by the king, Unni Kerala Varma, who became closer to the priest and befriended him from then on. In recognition of Xavier's services, the king allotted him a piece of land to construct a Catholic church, as a gesture of goodwill, as per the church records. There was already a small church, in the same place where St. Xavier's church stands at present, dedicated to Mary the Mother of God, since AD 1544. Church records indicate that St. Xavier Church was built in 1600. In 1865, the Shrine of Mary was renovated and enlarged. In 1930, the church was raised to the status of a cathedral. The annual festival is celebrated during November – December, lasting for 10 days.

== History ==
Saint Francis Xavier, a Spanish Jesuit missionary, landed in Goa in May 1542 and he sailed from Goa to Cape Comorin in October 1542 on missionary tour to Travancore Once a great band of dacoits attacked Travancore. Raja's forces couldn't combat the enemy successfully, but Xavier chased away the marauders at Vadasery by raising his Crucifix aloft and shouting at them. Very pleased with Xavier, the Raja showed special regards and gratitudes to him. At Kottar, Xavier had a dwelling house and a small church. Tradition says that the heathens set fire to Xavier's house and reduced it to ashes, but they were struck with awe when they saw the holy man on his knees devoutly praying, not in the least touched by the flames. To mark the place a cross was put up, to which miraculous powers were attributed. From the time the church was built on the spot, a lamp is kept perpetually burning. Even Hindus go there and make vows and pour oil. Miracles are recorded to have taken place there; and hence multitudes of devout Catholic pilgrims from British India, Ceylon and Malacca resort to the annual festival at St. Xavier's church, Kottar, about December of every year. Christianity in Travancore was introduced by the disciple of Jesus Christ St.Thomas in 52 AD. The primitive or original church which still subsists was built by St. Francis Xavier himself between the years AD 1542 and AD 1550. Afterwards the Bishops of Cochin constructed a new and more spacious church that was richly endowed with precious ornaments and utensils gifted by the Kings of Portugal. The mortal remains of Christian martyr Devasahayam Pillai were given a Christian burial in front of the high altar of St.Xavier's church at Kottar in January AD 1752. While being one of the oldest churches in the whole of erstwhile Southern Travancore, it is definitely the oldest Cathedral church of Roman Catholic Diocese of Kottar in the present-day's Kanyakumari district (of Tamil Nadu) since there are three more dioceses got established here later on.

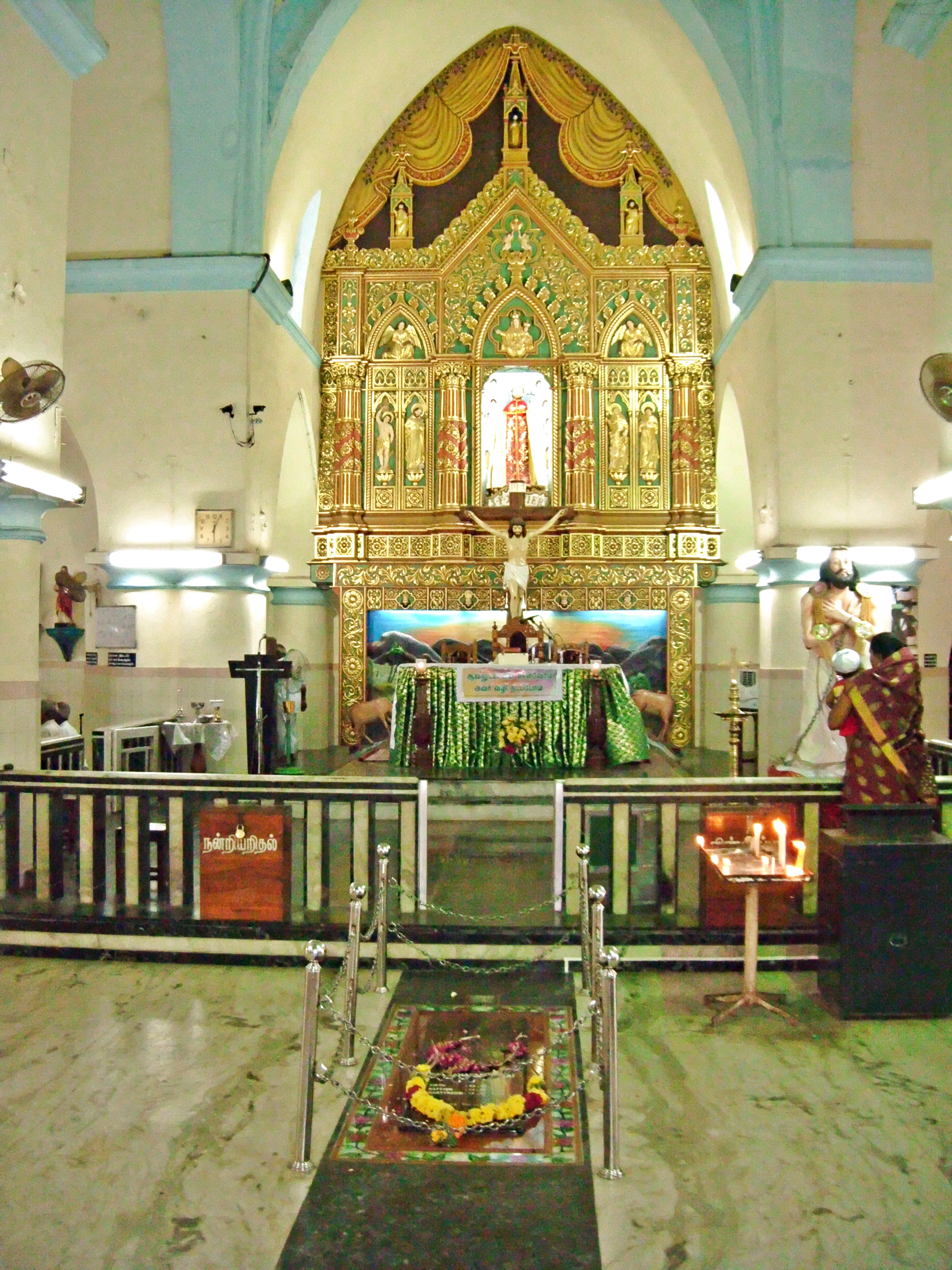
Internal view

== See also ==
- St. Francis Xavier
