= Moovattumugam =

Coordinates: 8°22′1″N 77°11′6″E

- Hamlet
- Interactive map of Moovattumugam
- Country: India
- State: Tamil Nadu
- District: Kanyakumari
- Time zone: UTC+5:30 (IST)
- Postal code: 619177
- Nearest city: Nagercoil

Moovattumugam is a hamlet in India situated 2 km northwest of Thiruvattar, where the rivers Kothai and Pahrali unify to flow southwest towards the Arabian Sea. An ancient Sastha Temple is situated the bank of Moovattumugom. There a narural buety is seen in the bank of Moovatumugam river. Every year, many Hindus visit Moovattumugam during the Malayalan month of karkidakam to celebrate the rites of Bali Tharpanam, a spiritual celebration of ancestral history. Every year Thiruvattar Adhikesava Perumaal Swami aarattu will be celebrated in the river of Moovattumugam.Thottavaram Lady of assumption Church and CSI Church Thottavaram are adjacent to this hamlet. Zigma Sports and arts club is one of the youth sports and arts development club in Thottavaram (Moovattumugam). Village towns Attoor & Thiruvattar are 1.5 km away.
