= Krishnancoil =

Place in Kanyakumari, Tamil Nadu, India

Krishnancoil is a suburb of Nagercoil, in the District of Kanyakumari, Tamil Nadu, India.

It is on National Highway 944.

== Infrastructure ==
A drinking water filtration plant situated there is popularly known as "filter house" which filters the drinking water from Mukkadal dam to Nagercoil town and surrounding areas.

== Notable people ==
- K. V. Mahadevan, composer
