= Nizhal Thangal of Pambankulam =

Place of worship

This Thangal of Pambankulam was the seventh among the Primary Nizhal Thangals (places of worship). It is west of Kadambankulam in the Tirunelveli-Kanyakumari National Highway east of Panakkudy.

A thangal was constructed during the 'Desa-sanjara' of Vaikundar. It was called the Pattakasalai Pathi.

== See also ==
- Pathi
- Worship centers of Ayyavazhi
