= Attoor, Kanyakumari =

Attoor
- Town
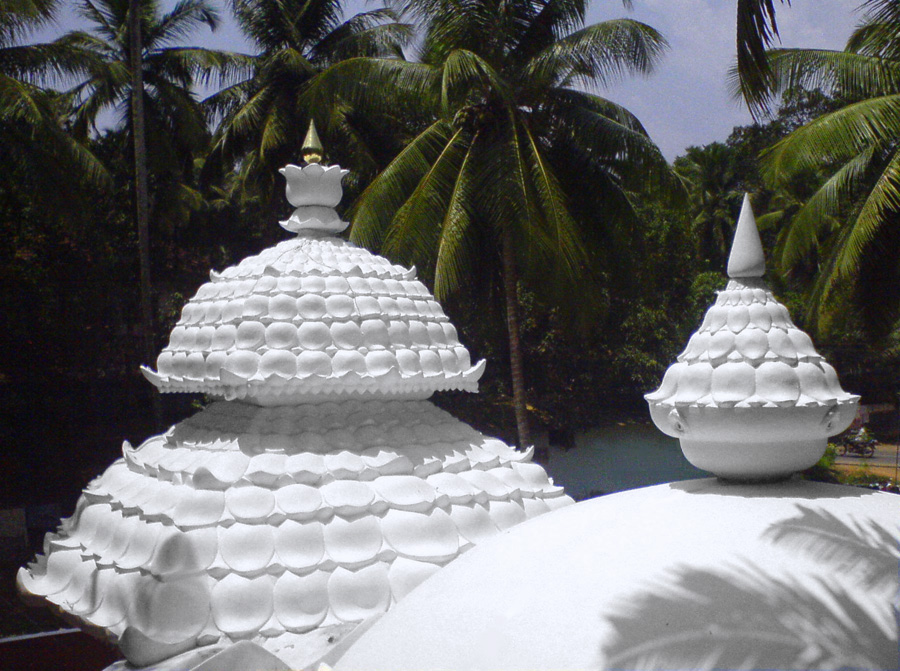
- An Ayyavazhi Thangal at Attoor

- Location in Tamil Nadu, India
- Coordinates: 8.33°N 77.26°E
- Country: India
- State: Tamil Nadu
- District: Kanniyakumari

Government
  - ?: ?
- Elevation: 130 m (430 ft)

Population (2001)
  - Total: 18,404

Languages
  - Official: Tamil
- Time zone: UTC+5:30 (IST)
- PIN: 629 177
- Telephone code: 91-4651
- Vehicle registration: TN-75

Attoor is a panchayat town in Kanniyakumari district in the Indian state of Tamil Nadu.

This town is situated 5 km north-east of Marthandam and 25 km north-west of Nagercoil. The Sri Adikesavaperumal Temple, which is one of the 108 Divya Desams, is situated 1 km east of Attoor.

== Demographics ==
As of 2011 India census, Attoor had a population of 11910. Males constitute 51% of the population and females 49%. Attoor has an average literacy rate of 83%, higher than the national average of 59.5%: male literacy is 84%, and female literacy is 82%. In Attoor, 10% of the population is under 6 years of age.

The place is known for the natural appeal and temples. Within 3 km from Attoor is the famous Jain Temple in a place called Chitharal. The temple is known to the local people as MalaiKovil (meaning temple in the hill). The name of the Hill is "Thiruchanathumalai" as incorporated in the Holy scripts of Jains. The posture of Jain is depicted in the outer walls of the Temple. Now the Jain temple has been occupied by Hindus and the sanctum sanctorum has deity of Devi.In the same place one can find two cashew nut companies and that is the major source of income for lot of people. Farm lands are now started converted to Rubber gardens. Attoor has a tropical climate and receives rainfall twice in a year. Almost 1 km from Attoor there is one old Lord Siva Temple. This temple was built 1000 years before. In front of the temple is a pond which is more than 500 m in length and 380 m in width. The entire pond filled up with lotus flowers is more than just beautiful. Ancient people used to believe life is not complete without worshiping in this temple.

== Educational Institutions ==
=== Schools ===
- Good Shepherd Nursery and Primary School
- N.V.K.S Higher Secondary School
- Yettacode Higher Secondary School
- Yettacode Nursery and Primary school
- Government High School Villonikonam

=== Colleges ===
- Maria College of Engineering and Technology
- Maria College of Ayurveda
- N.V.K.S College of Education
- White Memorial College of Physiotherapy
- White Memorial Homeopathy Medical College
- Maria Homeopathic Medical College
- Marthandam College of Engineering and Technology
- Maria Siddha Medical College
