= Marunthuvazh Malai =

Mountain peak in southern India

Coordinates: 8°8′3.27″N 77°30′28.32″E

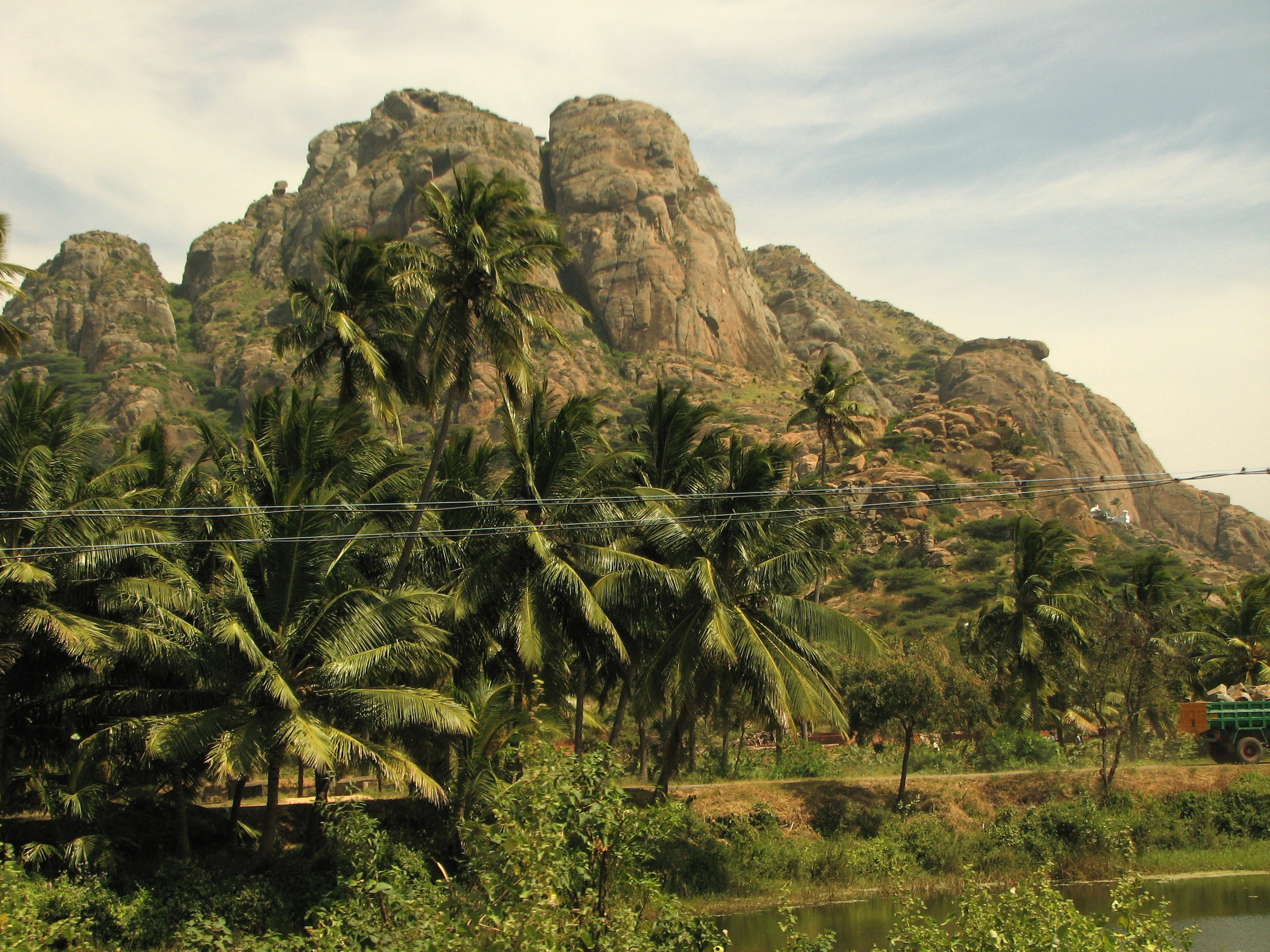
View of the hill from kanyakumari highway

The Marundhuvazh Malai, a part of Sanjeevi hills is also known as the Marundhu Vazhum Malai/Maruthwamalai ("the abode of medicinal herbs"), forms the part and the southernmost tip of the Western Ghats in Agasteeswaram taluk of Kanyakumari district of Tamil Nadu, India. People living in southern Kerala call it "Maruthuva Mala".

The hill stretches for more than a kilometer and reaches a height of 800 feet at the highest point, from which one can see the 'V' shape of the Indian subcontinent, as well as the three seas (the Bay of Bengal, Indian Ocean, and Arabian Sea), each with different shades of blue, and coconut trees with different shades of green. It is about 1 km from Pothaiyadi (a place along NH44 and NH66), and 10 km from Kanniyakumari town.

This hill is also believed to be known in Ayyavazhi mythology as Parvatha Ucchi Malai. Apart from the mythology, this hill is historically related to the life of Vaikundar. A few theologians consider this hill as sacred, as one of the Ayyavazhi holy sites. Narayana Guru attained enlightenment while undergoing penance (tapas) at this hill.

Marundhu Vaazh Malai is mentioned in Sri Pada Sri Vallabha Charithaamrutham, a biography of Lord Sripada Sri Vallabha (first avatar of Sri Dattaatreya) written in Sanskrit during the 13th century. This place is mentioned as "Maruthuva Malai" and the legend about this mountain is described. It is also said in the holy book Sri Pada Sri Vallabha Charithaamrutham that this is a holy land and siddhas and saints live in this mountain.

== Location ==
This mountain is located near to Pothayadi Junction, on the way of Nagercoil to kanyakumari and 1 km from mylaudy

== See also ==
- Ayyavazhi mythology
- Pancha pathi
- Ayyavazhi holy sites
