= Acharipallam =

Asaripallam
- Town
- Location in Tamil Nadu, India
- Coordinates: 8°10′2″N 77°23′51″E
- Country: India
- State: Tamil Nadu
- District: Kanniyakumari

Population (2001)
  - Total: 12,743

Languages
  - Official: Tamil
- Time zone: UTC+5:30 (IST)
- Postal code: 629201
- Vehicle registration: 74

Asaripallam is a town in the municipal corporation city of Nagercoil of the Kanniyakumari district in the Indian state of Tamil Nadu.

== Demographics ==
As of the 2001 India census, Asaripallam had a population of 12,743. Males constitute 50% of the population and females 50%. Asaripallam has an average literacy rate of 82%, higher than the national average of 59.5%; with 51% of the males and 49% of females literate. 10% of the population is under 6 years of age. The Kanyakumari Government Medical College is located at Asaripallam.
