= Nizhal Thangal of Chettikudiyiruppu =

Ayyavazhi worship center in Tamil Nadu, India

This Nizhal Thangal is 3 kilometres (2 mi) west to Swamithope. There was a zealous devotee for Vaikundar during his period. During the last phase of the Tavam, Vaikundar avoid speaking to anybody. So for giving message for the people Vaikundar blessed Mr. Swamiyadiyan of Eachan vilai, one of his devotee that, what ever Ayya think in his mind it will be heard by this man. Since he was booned to realize the thoughts of Vaikundar, he was called as "Varam petra Pandaram" – 'The booned mendicant'.

Swamiyadiyan (Varam petra Pandaram) donated his land, Palvannanthoppu, to Ayya and it was in this place the Nizhal Thangal of Chettikudiyiruppu constructed. 'Varam petra Pandaram' went to Swamithope along with his country-men and carried Ayya here in a cradle under a saffron umbrella.

Ayya pointed the place for laying foundation stone with his rattan-cane for the Thangal. This was the first ever Thangal. There was then a Parvati temple near this Thangal where 1001 goats are sacrificed. It was told that Ayya ordered that deity 'Parvathi' not to consent these sacrificial rituals. And then onwards those offering were stopped. A leaf-roofed structure with brick walls was constructed at the site where Ayya pointed. It was renovated in 1942 and a grand festival was celebrated in 1944 in the Tamil month of Avani. Festivals have taken place every year since then.

== See also ==
- Pathi
- Nizhal Thangal
- Worship centers of Ayyavazhi
