= Peruvilai =

Peruvilai Peruvalam
- village
- Interactive map of Peruvilai
- Coordinates: 8°10′56″N 77°23′36″E
- Country: India
- State: Tamil Nadu
- District: Kanyakumari

Government
  - Body: .

Languages
  - Official: Tamil
- Time zone: UTC+5:30 (IST)
- PIN: 629003
- Nearest city: Nagercoil
- Lok Sabha constituency: Nagercoil
- Vidhan Sabha constituency: Nagercoil

Peruvilai, also called Keezha Peruvilai, is a village near Nagercoil in Tamil Nadu, India.

== History ==
The primary occupation of the people is agriculture. Before independence, royal corporal punishment took place here. This was done by a person called Aarachar. The Shiva temple has a historical connection with the great king Marthanda Varma, who got his stomach pain treated after getting the blessings of Lord Chokkalinga, the form of the presiding deity here. A mosque is situated on the way to Parvathipuram. Peruvilai has many Hindu temples also, and they have their own history.

== Government and politics ==
S. Jeyapaul of the INC was elected as an M.L.A in 2006 representing the Colachel legislative segment. His native place is Peruvilai. He died in 2010. Before 2011, Peruvilai was under Colachel legislative segment and now in 2011, it is under Nagercoil legislative segment. From April 2011, Peruvilai Panchayath is upgraded and joined in nagercoil munucipality. This time the legislative member is Nanjil A.Murugaesan. He is elected by Nagercoil people as MLA. Mrs. Sheeja Shakemeeran was the president of the panchayath. She got an award from President A.P.J. Abdul Kalam for good environmental village in 2008. Mrs. Seerya Pushpam was the vice-president of the panchayath. After 2011 Peruvilai became town panchayath, and came under municipality. Now 2011, the councillor of Peruvilai is Mrs. Sukitha Nadarajan(Congress).After 2015 nagercoil municipality is upgraded as corporation and the ward is ward no 4 the councillor and mayor Adv.R.magesh first corporation mayor.

== Buses ==
A government bus 31A comes to Peruvilai from the vadsery bus stand, via krishnankovil, vetunimadam Parvathipuram. Additionally, more than five mini buses pass through Peruvilai to Assaripallam (Government Medical College).

== Education ==
The Government Higher Secondary School is situated there. It started in 2011. Many private schools are there, such as St. John's Matriculation School and Holy Mother Matriculation School. A government medical college is situated in Acharipallam which serves as the district medical college.
