= Kottar =

- Town
- Kottar, Tamil Nadu
- Coordinates: 8°10′12.7″N 77°26′33″E
- Country: India
- State: Tamil Nadu
- District: Kanyakumari
- Elevation: 41 m (135 ft)

Population (2011)
  - Total: 224,849

Languages
  - Official: Tamil
  - Spoken: Tamil, Malayalam
- Time zone: UTC+5:30 (IST)
- PIN: 629002
- Telephone code: 04652-
- Vehicle registration: TN 74
- Nearest city: Nagercoil
- Lok Sabha constituency: Kanyakumari
- Vidhan Sabha constituency: Nagercoil

Kottar is a locality and a bazaar area of Nagercoil, Tamil Nadu state, in the southernmost part of Peninsular India. It is the original town around which the city of Nagercoil grew and was an ancient trade centre of both Pandyans and Cheras at various times. The ancient mercantile centre of Kottar was established on the banks of the Pahrali River (Pazhayar).

Robert Caldwell describes the extent of Malayalam in the mid 19th century as extending from the vicinity of Mangalore in the north where it supersedes with Tulu and Kannada to Kottar beyond Pahrali River near Kanyakumari in the south where it begins to supersede with the Tamil and from Malabar Coast in the west to Western Ghats in the east besides the inhabited islands of Lakshadweep in the Arabian Sea. (Note: "The Malayalam, or 'Malayârma', ranks next in order. This language is spoken along the Malabar coast, on the western side of the Ghats, or Malaya range of mountains, from the vicinity of Mangalore, where it supersedes the Canarese and the Tuļu, to Trivandrum, where it begins to be superseded by the Tamil. The people by whom this language is spoken in the native states of Travancore and Cochin, and in the East India Company's districts of Malabar and Canara, may be estimated at two and a half millions." (Page 7) "Kottara: This is the name of a place in the country of the 'Aii', or ' Paralia ' (identical with South Travancore), which is called ‘Kottiara Metropolis' by Ptolemy, ' Cottora' by Pliny. Undoubtedly the town referred to is ‘Kôțţâra' or, as it is ordinarily spelled by Europeans, ‘ Kotaur,' the principal town in South Travancore, and now, as in the time of the Greeks, distinguished for its commerce. The name of the place is derived from ‘ Kôd-u, ' Tam., a line of circumvallation, a fortification, and " ârú, ' a river. It is a rule in the Tamil and the Malayalam, that when a word like ‘Kôd is the first member of a compound, the final ' ' must be doubled for the purpose of giving the word the force of an adjective : it is another rule that sonants when doubled become surds. Consequently the compound ‘kôd- ara' becomes by rule 'kôţt-âra' . It is interesting to perceive that in the time of the Greeks the same peculiar phonetic rules existed which are now in operation . It is also worth noticing that the Greek writers represent the last syllable of the name of the town, not as ' âru ,' but as 'âra . The Tamil has ' âru, ' the Malayalam 'ara ' At Kotaur, the dialectic peculiarities of the Malayalam language begin to supersede those of the Tamil; and this appears to have been the case even in the time of the Greeks." (Page 62-63))

In the modern day, Kottar is the main commodities market area of Kanyakumari District. The main railway station of Nagercoil, the Nagercoil Junction is at Kottar. The only Government Ayurveda Medical College in Tamilnadu state is also at Kottar.

== History ==
The history of Kottar stretches way back to the Sangam period. Thirugnyana Sambandhar, who lived in the 7th century A.D., portrays the natural beauty, business resources and the specialized art of Kottar in his 'Thirukkottaaru Padhigam', a part of 'Dhevaaram'. He starts it with 'Suchindrum Thalapuraanam', which also mentions the Kottar name reason. In the literature "Pandi Kovai" of the 8th century, it is mentioned that, Ninraseer Nedumaaran, a Pandian king who lived during the period of Thirugnyana Sambandhar, invaded Kottar and conquered it. Consequently, he earned the title 'Kotaaru Azhitha Kon.'

Foreign Sources

The Roman naturalist and writer, Pliny the Elder (who lived in between 23 – 79 A.D.) mentions Kottar as a commercial metropolis, having trade links with his contemporaneous Roman merchants.

Doctor Galdwell, one of the most authoritative Indologists of modern time's mentions, that Ptolemy, a Greek mathematician, astronomer and geographer who lived in Alexandria about 130 A.D., referred Kottar as Kottora Metropolis. Thus, Kottar which is now a part of Nagercoil, was in its own right, a trading emporium even prior to the first century A.D.

Temple Inscriptions

An inscription with information on Kottar was first found in Kommandaiyamman temple located at Vadasery (also now a locality in Nagercoil). This inscription was carved during the 18th ruling year of Rajaraja chozhan, which was in the year of 1003 A.D. 15 of the 19 inscriptions found in Sozhapuram Sozharaja temple call this city's name as 'Thiru Kotaaru' and 'Kottar'. These inscriptions were of the period of Rajendra chozhan, Kulothunga chozhan, Venaattu mannan, Veerakerala varman and Paraakirama pandiyan.

The inscription from Puravaseri Perumal temple of the 12th century A.D and from Pudhukkiramam Azhagiya Manavaala Perumal temple of the 14th century A.D also calls this city as Kottar. The 12th century inscription found from Thalapathysamuthiram Naaganaadha Swami temple located in the highways of Tirunelveli – Trivandrum highways remarks this highway as "Kotaaru peruvazhi". 4 of 7 inscriptions found in Vadiveeswaram Azhagamman temple also call this city as Kottar. From the inscriptions carved during the 15-16th century in this temple, we come to know that the place where this temple is built was called as Vadiveeswaram. The 14th century inscription found in Pudhukkiraamam Manavaala Perumal temple tells about Kottar and the Palace found there. The 16th century incarnations found in Parakkai and kariyamaanikka puram temples mentions this city as "Kotaaraana mummudi chozhapuram". In the 15th century the palm-leaf manuscript of Azhagiyapaandipuram mudhaliyaar points out this city as "Kotaaraana chozha keralapuram". A total of 12 incarnations were found in Nagaraja temple by the archeologists of Tamilnadu. In which one of the incarnations of 17th century mentions this city as Kottar.

Church Inscriptions & Christian Manuscripts

St. Francis Xavier, the great Roman Catholic missionary came to Kottar in 1544 A.D and started missionary work in the region keeping Kottar as his base. St. Francis Xavier built a small church at Kottar, which is today part of the St. Francis Xavier's Cathedral, Kottar, Nagercoil. The church comes under the Roman Catholic Diocese of Kottar, Nagercoil.

Roman Catholic martyr and Saint, Devasahayam Pillai, is interred at the St. Francis Xavier's Cathedral, Kottar.

In the 18th century A.D, St. Paulinus, a Western Christian religious missionary who stayed at Padmanabhapuram Palace had praised the significant specialties of Kottar's business and arts. In his words, the people who lived in Kottar were excellently ameliorated in music, dance and handicrafts. Dr. Caldwell, who wrote the Dravidian languages' 'Oppilakkanam', has also included Kottar's greatness in his book.

Williams Tobias Ringeltaube, a Protestant Christian Missionary came to Mylaudy in 1806 A.D and He built the first Protestant church (CSI Mylaudy) and started the first English medium school in Mylaudy. Also he continue his missionary work in Travancore. After that Charles Mead came to Mylaudy in December 1817 and continued the work of Williams Tobias Ringeltaube. As Charles found that he would not be able to continue his missionary work in Mylaudy, he shifted to Nagercoil in April 1818. In a letter written on 24 April 1818, Charles Mead mentions Nagercoil. This might be the first record of the newly named city Nagercoil. This letter is included in C.M. Augur's book titled "History of Christians in Travancore" (Page 683–684).

Mary Miller, wife of William Miller who came here to do Missionary work from England stayed here for a period of 5 months and died on 21.01.1828. This information was carved on her grave at the cemetery backside of the CSI Home church, Nagercoil. This incarnation notifies this city as Nagercoil and this is said to be the first incarnation found representing this city. It has been carved in English and Tamil languages.

Kottar was predominately occupied by Vellalars, Chettis, Paravars, Chavalakara Padayatchis, Kuravars and Nadars. Romans visited Kottar to trade during the 11th century as recorded in various articles and ancient history. India's architectural masterminds gather for the forum spending in researching and evolving the artifacts in and around Kottar.

== Locale ==
Kottar includes Kambolam a.k.a. Kottar Bazaar, Vadiveeswaram, Nagercoil Railway Station, Edalakudy, Elankadai, Vatta Vizhai, Chettikulam, Part of Cape Road

Tourist attractions around Kottar include St. Xavier's Cathedral, Kanyakumari town and beach, Suchindrum Temple, Vattakottai Fort (Circular Fort) and Sanguthurai Beach. The ancient and rich cultural traditions and legacy of Kottar had been a platform for spiritual development in the southern part of India. The people of Kottar and around contributed immensely in eradicating the slave market which was prevalent in those times.

Rustic games like Sadugudu or Kabbadi (two groups of people competing in capturing opponent's territory in return attacking and making the fighter to lose the consistent flow of breath to stop him from chanting), Kannampoochi (a very mundane and ancient version of hide and seek), Paandi (throwing the dice and reaching to that spot with one leg folded, by then mutually agreed to own the land resembles the colony captivation act of Americans during the 16th century), Seven dice (In the early ages during British rule in India, this game was invented indirectly to showcase the anti-British rule by destructing seven layered dices formed in the centre of the play court).

Most prominently, there were community of people named as "Aasan" are celebrated as demigod who were believed to have supernatural powers and gained them with the influence of science and meditation. It was said that Aasans were invited by many influential persons around the World to learn the craft of healing and resurrection. Aaroodam (Prophecy), a profession which was conceded to the heir of the Families traditionally had been acclaimed and believed that they have the will to study the destiny of a Human.

Renowned Locations: Marunthuvazh malai (Translated as Mountain of Medicines); a significant place 8 km away from Kottar. A mount surrounded by therapeutic plantations plays a remarkable role in Epic Ramayana. Kanyakumari · Kalikesam · Mathur Hanging Trough · Mukkadal · Muttom · Olakaruvi · Padmanabhapuram Palace · Pechiparai Reservoir · Sothavilai Beach · Thiruparrapu · Udayagiri · Vattakottai Fort · Vattakottai · Vattaparai Falls

Notable Shrines: Devi Kanya Kumari Temple · St. Xavier's Church · Kumara coil · Marunthuvazh Malai · Mondaicaud Bhagavathi Temple · Nagaraja Temple · Pancha pathi Peer Mohammed Dargah · Sivalayams · Sri Adikesavaperumal Temple. Marungoor Murugan Temple · Swamithope pathi · Thanumalayan Temple · Thirunadhikkara · Thiruppathisaram · Thirucharanathumalai, Uchni mahali amman Temple in kottar, vanigar amman Temple, yelagaram perumal Temple, Ayurpirati amman Temple, Sevistasasta Temple, Pungaiyadi Vinayagar Temple

== Schools ==
- SMRV Higher Secondary School
- Scott Christian Higher Secondary School
- Carmel Higher Secondary School
- S.L.B. Government Higher Secondary School
- St. Josephs Convent Higher Secondary School
- D.V.D. Higher Secondary School
- St.Teresa's Anglo Indian Matriculation School
- Sri Narayana Guru Matriculation Higher Secondary School
- Kumari Matriculation School
- Yezhagaram government higher secondary school
- Sri Krishnammal Matric Hr Sec School
- S.S.Pavalar Government Higher Secondary School
- Kavimani Desigavinayagam Pillai (KDVP) Girls Higher Secondary School
- ISED Higher Secondary School
- Malick Dhinar Matriculation School
- Mogals Nursery School

== Transport ==
- Nearest Airport: Trivandrum International Airport. Distance: 72 km
- Nearest Railway Station: Nagercoil Junction. Distance: 0.7 km
- Nearest Bus Stand: Nagercoil Bus Stand. Distance: 1 km
