= Parvathipuram, Tamil Nadu =

Town in Tamil Nadu, India

Parvathipuram
- Town
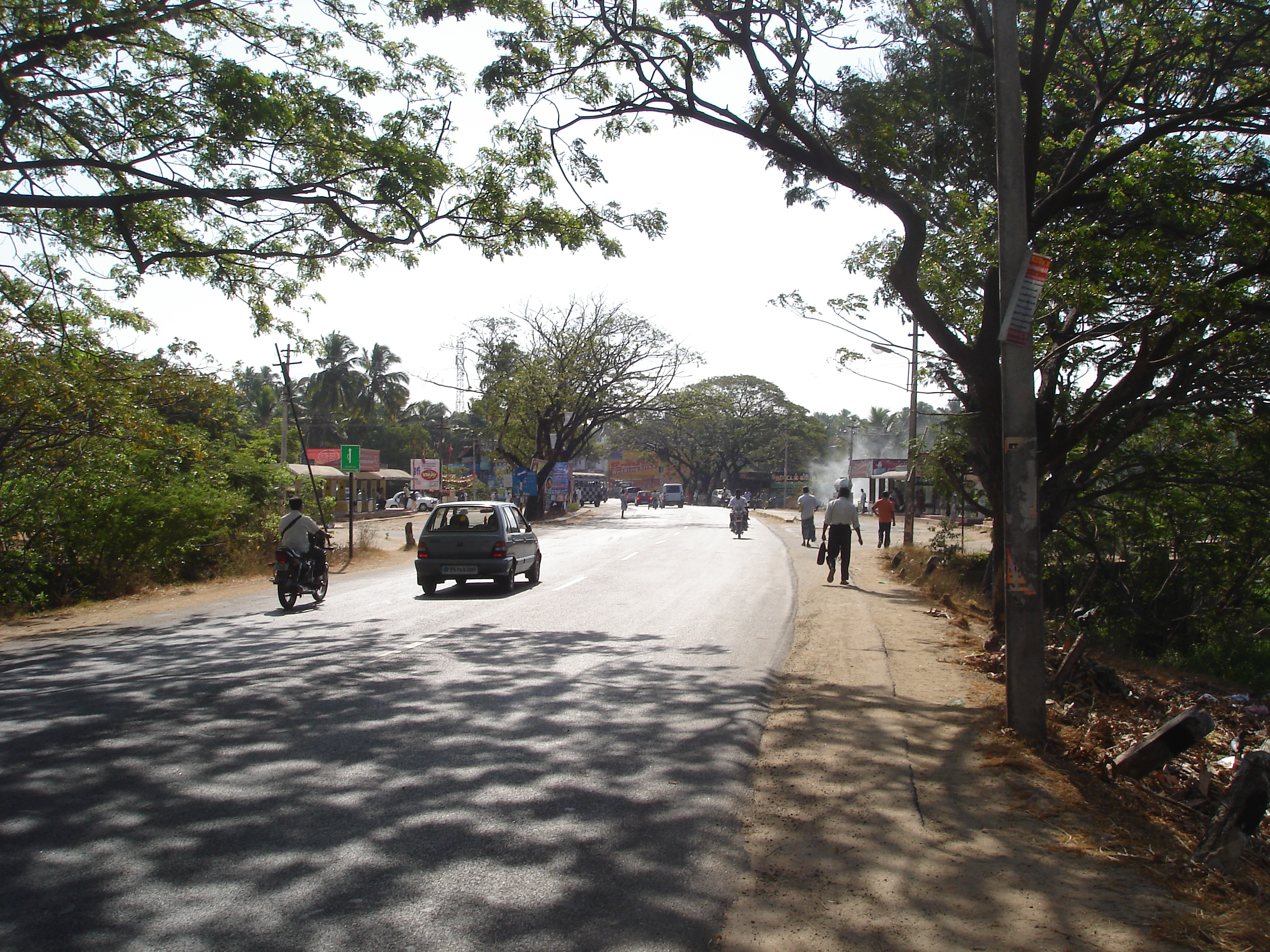
- Parvathipuram junction

- Parvathipuram, Tamil Nadu
- Coordinates: 8.191800°N 77.399200°E
- Country: India
- State: Tamil Nadu
- District: Kanyakumari
- Elevation: 55 m (180 ft)

Languages
  - Official: Tamil
- Time zone: UTC+5:30 (IST)
- PIN: 629 003
- Telephone code: 04652
- Vehicle registration: TN 74
- Nearest city: Nagercoil central

Parvathipuram is a town located amid the municipal Corporation of Nagercoil in Kanyakumari district, Tamil Nadu. It is located on NH 66 about five KM from Nagercoil central and 60 km from Thiruvananthapuram. It is called the gateway of Nagercoil.

Parvathipuram is named after the Queen of South Travancore, Smt. Parvathibai Thamburatti, who was instrumental in giving away a vast area of cultivable land to people of Gramam populated mainly by Brahmins, for the hospitality they have shown to the Queen and her royal family while they were returning from Suchindram temple. Singarathoppu, Laksminager, VGS nager, Saradhanager, Rajivgandhinager, Annanager, are lately formed residential areas of Parvathipuram and they formed the heart of Parvathipuram. Peruvilai, Kanyakulam, Alamparai, Christopher Nagar, Rajalakshmi nagar, Elanthayadi, Kaliancaud are nearby localities. Among these Peruvilai is a large adjacent part of Parvathipuram. All the buses to Trivandrum and most of the western region of Kanyakumari district traveling through NH 66 stop at Parvathipuram. 31A Parvathipuram to Parvathipuram circular bus connects Parvathipuram with Christopher bus stand and Anna bus stand. This service is available for every 4 minutes.

The town presently houses a number of engineering colleges: Ponjesly College of Engineering, James College Of Engineering And Technology, St. Xavier's Catholic College of Engineering, Vins Group of Engineering colleges, and Sun College of Engineering & Technology are located within 2 km from here and near by polytechnic colleges are Sree Krishna Polytechnic College, Sun Polytechnic College, and Morning Star Polytechnic college.

Nearby railway stations are Nagercoil Town railway station, Aloor railway station and so 5 km from Nagercoil Junction railway station.

Temples near by Parvathipuram are Lord Vanamaliswara temple, Arulmigu Mutharaman temple, Sree Krishna temple in Gramam, and Lord Swamy Ayyappa Temple.

Churches nearby are The Salvation Army Church Elanthayadi, The Salvation Army Church Kaniyakulam Parayadi, The Salvation Army Church Pandrathoppu, Seventh Day Adventist Church Kaniyakulam Parayadi, Thooya Thainesi Matha Catholic Church, Alamparai CSI Church, Syro Malabar Church Pandrathoppu.

Banks include the Syndicate Bank, State Bank Of India, Tamil Nadu Mercantile Bank, Indian Bank, and Pandiyan Grama Bank.

The Anandanar channel runs through Parvathipuram and separates Nagercoil town from Aloor panchayat at the south and Kaniyakulam panchayat at the north. Parvathipuram comes under Eraniel police Station.

== Notable Residents ==
- B. Jeyamohan , Author
- Neela Padmanabhan , Author and recipient of Sahitya Akademi Award.
- Samuel Jeberson John, Historian and Archivist.
- Vice Admiral Nilakanta Krishnan, Western Naval Command.
- Nilakanta Mahadeva Ayyar, 1922 batch IAS Officer.
