= Worship centers of Ayyavazhi =

The Pathis and Nizhal Thangals, are centers of worship and religious learning for the followers of Ayyavazhi which are established in different parts of India. They served as centres for propagation of the beliefs and practices of Ayyavazhi. There are more than 8000 worship centers throughout India, mostly in Tamil Nadu and Kerala. The Pathis are given religious importance than the Nizhal Thangals and are considered as primary worship centers. Since Ayyavazhi is not an organised religion, Swamithoppepathi serves, religiously but not officially, as the headquarters of all.

== Pathis ==
Pathis were the important centres of congregational worship, being relatively bigger structures like that of a temple. They obtain their significance from the fact that Ayya Vaikundar and his activities were historically associated with these centers of worship. They are seven in number. All the Pathis except the Avatharappathi are situated in the Kanyakumari district. Since Ayyavazhi is not an organised religion the Swamithope pathi though considered as religious headquarters, it officially does not control the rest of the religious centers. And hence all the Pathis are independently managed by different formed committees or by organisations. Some Pathis are maintained by the native Ayyavazhi followers of that particular area after the period of Vaikundar.

Generally two facts are required to accredit a site as Pathi, They are

1. The site(place) should be historically associated with the incarnational activities of Vaikundar.
2. The site should be mentioned in Akilam by referring it using the term 'Pathi' .

=== Panchappathis — the Primary Pathis ===
The Pathis are calculated as seven including Avatharappathi and Vakaippathi as Akilam call them using the term 'Pathi' and because they are related to the incarnational activities of Vaikundar. But at present, due to some conflict between the followers in accepting them as equal importance with other Pathis, only the Panchappathis are accepted by the whole mass as Pathis. Also the List of Pathis from the Swamithoppe, the religious headquarters does not include the Pathis other than Panthappathis. The Panchappathis are

1. Swamithope pathi
2. Ambalappathi
3. Muttappathi
4. Tamaraikulampathi
5. Pooppathi

So on such case the Avatharappathi and Vakaippathi will attain its religious status as worship centers between that of Pathis and Nizhal Thangals. (i.e.) lesser important than Panchappathis and more important than Thangals. In any case Swamithoppe Pathi is not only the religious headquarters, but also the center which gains the highest religious importance from the incarnational activities of Vaikundar.

== Nizhal Thangals ==
Nizhal Thangals were simple small structures built for the purpose of worship and for learning the teachings of Ayya Vaikundar. They served as centers of education during the early days. Food and shelter were offered to the needy in these centers. Some of them were established when Vaikundar was alive. Even now charity is one of the main activities conducted in these centers.

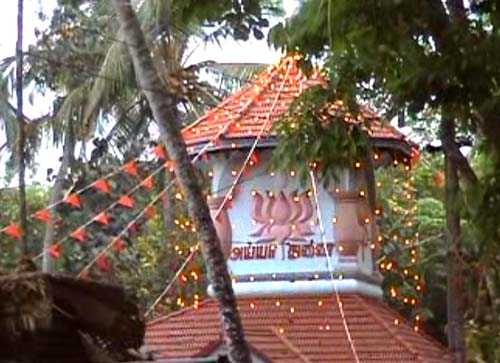
Nizhal Thangal of Kokkanchi, one among the famous Thangals is western Kanyakumari, Tamil Nadu.

These Nizhal Thangals formed place in the socio-religious life of the people. All the people were brought together here irrespective of caste distinctions which was not usual at that period of time. The mode and formalities of worship were revolutionalised in these centers. Some 7 of the Thangals are constructed even at the time of the earthly life of Vaikundar. Religiously, these seven are considered primary among the Thangals. They are,

1. Chettikudiyiruppu
2. Agastheeswaram
3. Paloor
4. Sundavilai
5. Vadalivilai
6. Kadambankulam
7. Pambankulam

Among the secondary worship centers Thangals, these seven of them are considered primary, and are considered sacred and seen with historical importance. These are the oldest among the Thangals.

== See also ==
- List of Ayyavazhi-related articles
- Ayyavazhi
- Ayya Vaikundar
