= Kadambankulam =

Village in Tamil Nadu, India

Coordinates: 9°30′44″N 77°59′36″E

Kadambankulam is a small village in the Radhapuram taluk of Tirunelveli District, Tamil Nadu in southern India. It is seven kilometers from the larger town of Valliyur. Kadambankulam, a hamlet in the extreme south of Valliyur, covers an area of 30 km^{2}. As the major occupation of the villagers is agriculture, around 60% of the area is covered by agricultural land. Kadambankulam enjoys a tropical climate with an average temperature of 31˚C. It has an average annual rainfall of 150 cm, receiving rain both from the Southwest Monsoon and the Northeast Monsoon. Kadambankulam has a population of around 6,000, out of which 3,100 are men and 2,900 are women. Everyone in this village is a member of Ayyavazhi, a monistic belief system closely linked with Hinduism. Kadambankulam is the only known village where all the people belong to the same religion and live as a single community.

Kadambankulam is known for its red soil, which is fertile and rich in minerals. The major agricultural crops are rice and plantains. Groundnut and vegetables are also cultivated in the area. Many rare herbal plants of medicinal value are also available. Villagers take their water from wells and a pond in the village with channels that supply water to the fields. People adopt natural means for ploughing, weeding and other agricultural activities. They mainly depend on manpower. This helps many women to earn their living by being employed, either directly or indirectly.
