= Thiruvattar =

- Town
- Location in Tamil Nadu, India
- Coordinates: 8°19′57.664″N 77°16′5.547″E
- Country: India
- State: Tamil Nadu
- District: Kanyakumari

Government
  - ?: ?
- Elevation: 13 m (43 ft)

Population (2001)
  - Total: 18,404

Languages
  - Official: Tamil
  - Spoken: Tamil Malayalam
- Time zone: UTC+5:30 (IST)
- PIN: 629 177
- Telephone code: 91-4651
- Vehicle registration: TN-75

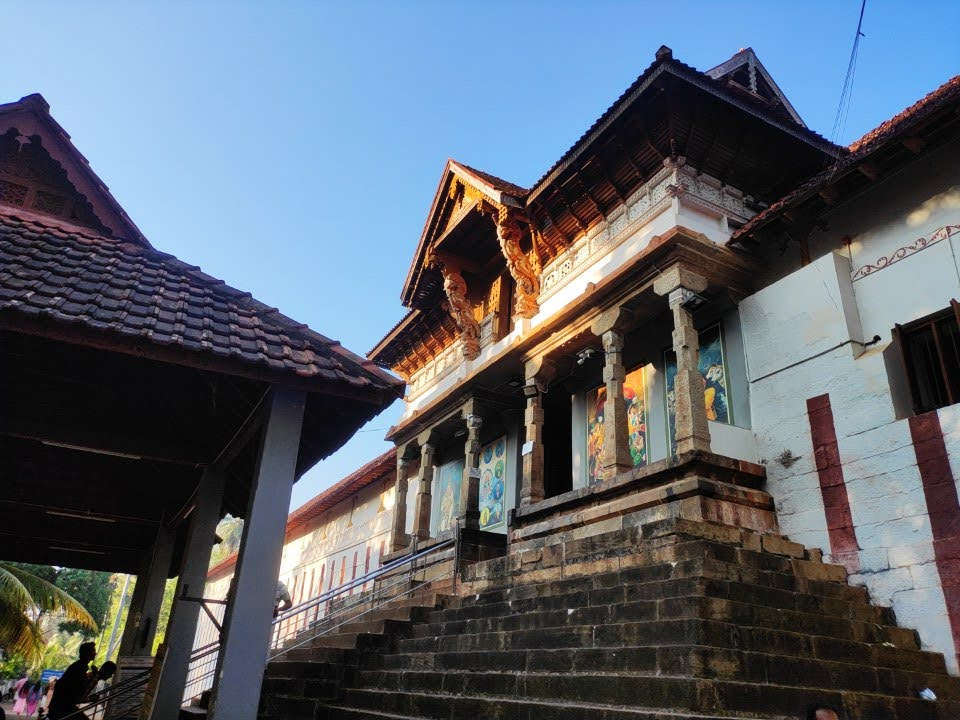
Sri Adikesava Perumal Temple, Thiruvattar

Thiruvattar is a panchayat town in Kanyakumari district in the Indian state of Tamil Nadu.

== About the town ==
This town is situated 6 kilometres (3.7 mi) northeast of Marthandam and 30 km (19 mi) northwest of Nagercoil. The two main rivers, the Pahrali River and the Kothai surround the village and join in Moovattumugam, giving the name Thiru (sacred) + vatta (surround) + aru (river). This village, where the famous Sri Adikesavaperumal Temple is located, is one of the 108 Divya Desams. Thiruvattar has been mentioned as Adi Keshava kshetra by Madhva sect saint Shri Vadiraja Tirtha in his pilgrimage travelogue Tirtha Prabandha, written in the sixteenth century.

== Demographics ==
As of 2001 India census, Thiruvattar had a population of 18,404. Males constitute 49% of the population and females 51%. Thiruvattar has an average literacy rate of 77%, higher than the national average of 59.5%: male literacy is 78%, and female literacy is 75%. In Thiruvattar, 10% of the population is under 6 years of age.

== Politics ==
Thiruvattar assembly constituency is part of Nagercoil (Lok Sabha constituency).

As per the latest restructuring, the Thiruvattar assembly constituency has been split and merged with nearby constituencies.

== See also ==
- Kulasekaram
- Vaikunda Chella Pathi
- Kesavapuram
