= Vadakkankulam =

- Town
- Vadakangulam
- Nickname: Vadavai
- Location in Tamil Nadu, India
- Coordinates: 8°16′N 77°36′E
- Country: India
- State: Tamil Nadu
- District: Tirunelveli

Languages
  - Official: Tamil
- Time zone: UTC+5:30 (IST)
- PIN: 627116
- Telephone code: 04637
- Vehicle registration: TN-72
- Lok Sabha constituency: Tirunelveli
- Vidhan Sabha constituency: Radhapuram

Vadakkankulam is a small town in Radhapuram Taluka, Tirunelveli District of Tamil Nadu state, India. It was the home of S. A. Raja. Notable attraction is the Holy Family Church, which was built in 1779.

== Religion ==
Vadakankulam is the first parish of the interior area that joined the Pearl Fishery Coast mission and it was the last parish of the south western border of the Madurai mission. St. Devasahayam, the layman saint of India was Baptised in Vadakangulam in the Year 1744.

St. John de Britto who was on horse journey accosted the four Catholic families here who had come from the village of Thoppuvilai in 1600. He built a small thatched church dedicated to the Holy family in 1605. As many Catholic families from elsewhere settled down here, it became part of Nemam mission belonging to the Jesuit province of Cochin.

Chapels:

- St. Michael church, Michaelpalayam, 1910.
- Our Lady's church (Arputha Matha), Bajanaimadam, 1861.
- Our Lady of Sorrows church, Cemetery, 1861.
