= Nizhal Thangal =

Holy places in India

Nizhal Thangal (Tamil: நிழல் தாங்கல்) (Malayalam: നിഴൽ താങ്കൽ) also called Inai Thangals) are secondary worship places of the Ayyavazhi, often smaller in size than Pathis, built per the instructions of Akilattirattu Ammanai. Cleanliness is strictly enforced.

Though the common people, mainly in early times call them as Narayanaswami koil or Narayanaswami pathi, the Ayyavazhi scriptures consider these centers distinct from The Pathis. They call these worship centers, which were not associated with the religious activities of Vaikundar, 'Inai Thangals'.

== History ==
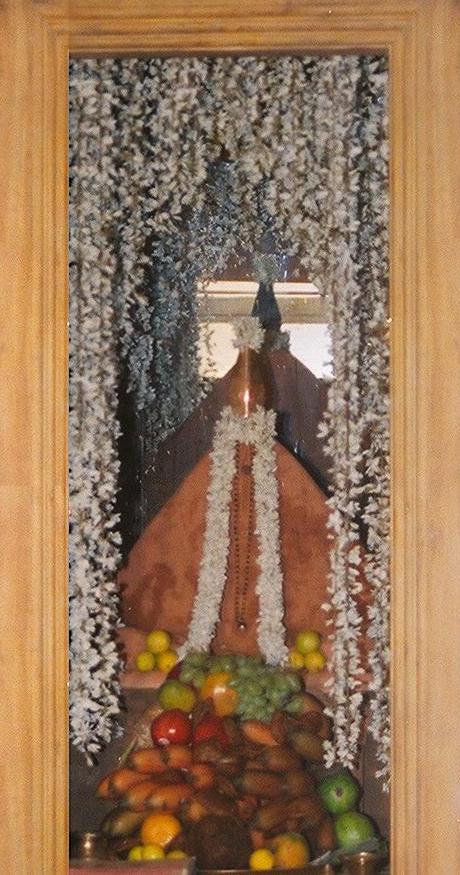
The Palliyarai of a Nizhal Thangal near Thiruvattar, Tamil Nadu

After the trial of Vaikundar with the king of Travancore, the followers built religious centers following his instructions to propagate his teachings which were called as Nizhal Thangal. Akilattirattu Ammanai call this as religious schools. The LMS reports too speak in abundance about these worship centers

Tamil is the official language of worship, and the object of worship is Lord Narayana with the trinity of Brahma, Vishnu, and Shiva. Nizhal Thangals in Chettikudiyiruppu, Agastheeswaram, Paloor, Sundavilai, Vadalivilai, Kadambankulam and Pambankulam were established during the period of Vaikundar per Akilam. And after a large number of Thangals were established throughout India. There are more than 8000 worship centres throughout India

These Nizhal Thangals formed place in the socio-religious life of the people. All the people were brought together here irrespective of caste distinctions. The mode and formalities of worship were revolutionalised in these centers.

== Architecture and Structure ==
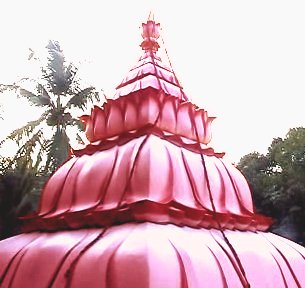
A Nizhal Thangal near Marthandam, Tamil Nadu

Unlike Pathis this Thangals were of small size. Inside the Nizhal Thangals, no murti or idol is used. The Palliyarai of Thangals generally seems similar to Pathis. But inside, in most of the Thangals instead of raised pedestal, chairs were placed as asanas in which the saffron or silk cloths are wrapped-around. A garland made of rudraksha (string of rudraksha beads) is placed around the neck of the asana. Mirrors were placed behind. In front of these there will be two standing oil lamps(kuthu vilakku)made of brass, each placed on the either side of the asana.

In some of the Thangals there will be inner corridors as pathis to circumambulate the Palliyarai. A hall is attached to this palliyarai for the worshippers. In some of the Thangals there are flag masts, Vahanas and temple cars etc.

== Administration ==
Some of the thangals were built and maintained by single individuals, some by various organisations and some built as town or village-commons. Since Ayyavazhi is not an organised religion, thangals are not officially controlled by Swamithoppe, though it was considered as the religious headquarters. It was considered ritualistic by the Ayyavazhi followers to lay foundation stones for new Thangals by someone from Payyan dynasty. It seems that the scriptures too give a high status to them in such matters. A survey from the year 2004 states that there are more than 8000 Nizhal Thangals throughout South India mostly in Tamil Nadu and Kerala.

Some Nizhal Thangals serve as community centers, with facilities to cook for large crowds of people; others serve as schools for the community and some as both.

== Prayer and Rituals ==
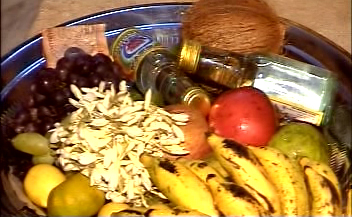
A Churul kept prepared to be offered to Panividai

Though the Ayyavazhi scriptures says about a three-time-worship in common for Nizal Thangals and Pathis, most of the Nizhal Thangals use to conduct Panividais (poojas) only twice per day. The three time worship includes Ukappadippu along with Pothippu at the dawn and at the dusk and the Ucchippadippu in the noon.

But most of the Nizhal Thangals conduct this Ucchippadippu on every Sundays seven times collectively, considering one time per day of a week. On that days Anna Dharmam (charity on food) is conducted. Some Thangals use conduct this Ucchippadippu on Fridays too. While at few Thangals, which were run by single individuals, the Panividai is conducted only once per day in the evening.

=== Pal vaippu ===
This 'Pai vaippu' is a festival in which the rice boiled in milk and used to serve as grew. At present every worship centers of Ayyavazhi has this practice at least once in a month, while in some other Thangals it was conducted once in a week. During this Pal vaippu cooked rice is also served in addition to this 'Pal' as an action of charity. During this days as ritualistic actions, the 'Periya Ukappadippu' (the extended Ukappadippu), ' Thana Niraivu Vasakam ' and 'Vazappadippu' is also sung in the evening as additional form of Prayers during this days.

== Festivals ==
The main form festival which is conducted in Nizhal Thangals are The Thiru Eadu Vasippu and the Vaikunda Avatharam. The Thiru-Eadu Vasippu was conducted for several days while the Vaikunda Avatharam celebration is mostly for a day of time in Nizhal Thangals. Some Thangals use to conduct Annual festivals too.

=== Thiru-Eadu Vasippu ===
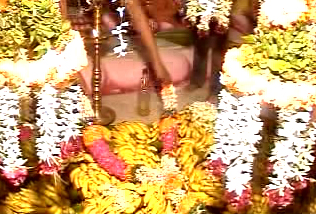
The Panividais kept for the festival of Thirukkalyana Vasippu

This Thiru Eadu Vasippu, the ritual reading and expatiation of the Holy book Akilam, is an important religious observance of Ayyavazhi. During this days the morning Panivadais are conducted as usual, while in the evening Akilam the scripture of Ayyavazhi is read melodiously by two talented persons and another person use to explain the read verses in a prose form. At the end of every day Anna Dharmam was conducted. This festival was conducted in several Nizhal Thangals for seventeen days (as in Pathis) and the whole content is read-finished. While some other thangals conduct this for three, five, seven, or ten days term reading selected part from the scripture.

Some thangals conduct this Thiru-Eadu Vasippu along with the Annual festivals while on some other centers annual festivals are celebrated separately. During that days ' Vahanam Eduppu ' is conducted in which the asanam is carried on Vahanas (vehicles) as processions by the followers.

=== Vaikunda Avatharam ===
This was the only festival in Ayyavazhi, which is celebrated at a time throughout all the worship centers across the country. During this festival on 19th masi (3 March) the day before the Ayya Vaikunda Avataram, the Nizhal Thangals used to conduct one day festival for a grand scale along with Anna Dharmam throughout the day. On the next day 20th of the Tamil month masi, (4 March) all the followers used to visit Panchappathis and so most of the Thangals remain closed while some thangals used to continue the festival as the previous day.

== See also ==
- List of Ayyavazhi-related articles
- Pathi
- Ayyavazhi
