= Ayyavazhi festivals =

The festivals and celebrations play an important role in the socio-religious universe of Ayyavazhi. Some of the festivals are common for both Pathis and Nizhal Thangals, while some are confined to Pathis. In Swamithope pathi, every day is celebrated as a festival with the name 'Nitham Thirunal'. Normally all the festivals are celebrated grandly in Swamithope than any other worship centers of Ayyavazhi. LMS reports to witness such festivals.

== Nitham Thirunal ==
The Nitham Thirunal is likely to be celebrated only in Swamithope pathi. This celebration includes the daily rituals connected to the Panividais and worship in Swamithope. Usually the Palliyarai is opened for worship at 4.00 am daily, with the sounds of Blowing Conch and bells. Following this, a Panividaiyalar used to circumambulate the Pathi, first the Santhana-veethi (First circumambulating route) and then the Ratha-veethi (Second circumambulating route). Then around the Palliyarai (sanctum sanctorum) is again closed around 4.30 am and opened again for the morning Panividai at 5.30 am. Then the Elunetru is carried in a Vahana around the Pathi through the two circumambulating routes. When the Vahana reaches the Vadakku vasal (the northern entrance) in the Santhana-veethi, the Dharma-mani is rung and the 'Thavanai Pal' (holy rice gruel) is given for the worshippers. Once the Vahana bavani comes to the end, the elunetru is taken back to the Palliyarai under umbrella and the 'Nithiya Pal' (holy rice gruel) to the worshippers.

As part of noon-fest, the east entrance (main entrance) is opened and the noon-prayer, Ucchippadippu is sung by Payyans which was followed by the worshippers. At the end, after smearing Thirunamam for the worshippers, Santhana-Pal (Sandal-milk) is offered to the worshippers and followed by offering 'Thavanai Pal' in the Vadakku Vasal. The evening celebrations are the same as that of Morning. The only difference is instead of 'Thavanai Pal' (the rice gruel) the 'Umban Annam' (rice cooked with vegetables together) in the Vadakku Vasal.

The Ukappadippu is sung during the morning and evening fests and Ucchippadippu during the nool festival. The Vahana-bavani is conducted in the morning and evening. The Palliyarai is opened for the common mass for worship three times a day, and closed around 8.00 pm. Akilam admits that by celebrating every day as a festival, the evil Kali would destroy itself.

== Weekly festivals ==
Mostly all Ayyavazhi worship centers conduct a weekly festival, where the Sundays occupy the important place. Most of the Pathis, including Swamithope and Mutta Pathi conduct special celebrations on Sundays, weekly. In Ambala Pathi, the Tuesdays are considered holy, since the divine marriage of Vaikundar with the seven deities took place there. This practise is there right from the times of Vaikundar.

Apart from this some Nizhal Thangals conducts special Panividais on Fridays, while few others select Thursdays to be the day of weekly festivals.

== Muthal Kizhamai ==
The Muthal kizhamai festival is celebrated in Swamithope during the first Sundays of every Tamil Month. Some Nizhal Thangals conduct these festivals not during Sundays, but during the first Fridays of all Tamil months. Special Anna Dharmams will be done on Muthal Kizhamais.

== Kodiyettru Thirunal ==
Kodiyettru Thirunal is common for all Pathis. Nowadays many Nizhal Thangals have also started conducting this festival. There are views that Pathis only should conduct Kodiyetru Thirunal. Some even argue that no worship centers have right to conduct this festival other than Swamithope pathi.

In Swamithope pathi three such festivals are celebrated annually during the Tamil months of Avani, Thai and Masi. Each fest includes eleven days. Other Pathis conduct this once in a year. The festival starts with the Kodi-yetru(flag hoisting) Usually, a 'Seven days Picchai' (ritual practice of begging on behalf of human beings to God) is performed starting from the first days of the Festival. During these festival days, special Panivadais are being performed. The eighth day Anna Dharmam was considered with great importance. Each days the elunetru is carried in different Vahanas around the Pathis. As usual three Panividais(Pooja) are conducted. The eighth day is considered 'Kali-vettai' (as day of hunting of Kali). The eleventh day, will be the Car festival and the festival comes to an end in the early morning (3.30 am) of the twelfth day.

== Thiru Eadu Vasippu ==
This is the only Ayyavazhi festival common and free to be conducted in all worship centers. It was normally conducted for about Seventeen days. It normally begins in a Friday and ends in a Sunday. In Swamithope Pathi the Thiru Eadu Vasippu begins on the last Friday of the Tamil month of Karthigai and conducted for seventeen days. During these days the contents of Akilam was sung melodiously. The contents of Akilam was parted into seventeen and continued from the successive parts of the previous days. Every day the Vasippu is begun with the Kappu. Normally, the fifteenth day 'Thrikkalyana-vasippu' and the seventeenth day 'Pattabhishega-vasippu' are considered with high religious importance.

Almost all Pathis and Nizhal Thangals conduct this festival once in a year. Other than the Seventeen days schedule, Some thangals conduct it for about three days, five days, seven days, Ten days etc. Generally this festival will not be conducted in any Pathis or Nizhal Thangals during the Tamil Month of Karthigai, since it was conducted there in Swamithope then.

== Ayya Vaikunda Avatharam ==
This day, which is the incarnational day of Vaikundar from the Sea of Tiruchendur was the largest festival of Ayyavazhi and was the only festival celebrated in all worship centers simultaneously. It was celebrated on the 20th day of the Tamil Month of Masi. The celebrations in Swamithope on this day was considered highly sacred. The nationwide Ayyavazhi followers usually take a pilgrimage to Swamithope and the other Pancha pathis during this day. Several processions are held in many parts of the country apart from 'The Great procession' indicating the incarnation of Vaikundar.

This day was an official holiday for the southern districts of Tamil Nadu such as Kanyakumari, Thoothukudi and Tirunelveli. In fact this is the only Ayyavazhi festival which is celebrated according to the Solar calendar.

== See also ==
- Ayyavazhi rituals
- Ayyavazhi holy sites
- Ayyavazhi scriptures
- Ayya Vaikunda Avataram
