= Timeline of Ayyavazhi history =

The purpose of this chronology is to give a detailed account of Ayyavazhi from the beginning of the incarnational events of Vaikundar to the present time. Question marks on dates indicate approximate dates. A star (*) indicates the mentioning of that particular date in Akilam or Arul Nool. All dates but a few are found in the Tamil calendar and so doesn't coincide exactly with the months of the Gregorian calendar. The dates may span over any halves of the two consecutive months (Gregorian).

== Early Avatars ==
As per Akilathirattu Ammanai the source of Ayyavazhi mythology sect of Hinduism, lists the following avatars

- Neetiya Yuga - Lord Narayana
- Chathura Yuga - Matsya Avatar
- Netu Yuga - Kurma Avatar, Varaha Avatar
- Kretha Yuga - Muruga Avatar, Narashima Avatar
- Thretha Yuga - Vamana Avatar, Parashurama Avatar, Rama Avatar
- Dwapara Yuga - Krishna Avatar

== Incarnational era ==
- 1833 March 4 – Lord Narayana incarnated as Vaikundar in the world and raised from the sea of Tiruchendur, took the Human form as Pantaram from Tharuvaiyur of Thoothukudi District.
- 1833 March 5 – Vaikundar stayed in Udangudi.
- 1833 March 6 – Vaikundar reached Swamithoppe.
- 1833 December/January – The first phase of the Tavam of Vaikundar begins.
- 1836 November/December – The second phase of the Tavam (penance) begins.
- 1837 December/January – The third phase of the Tavam begins.
- 1839 November/December – The king of Travancore, Swathi Thirunal Rama Varma reached Suchindrum on a state visit.
- 1840 March 3 – After the encounter with the King Swathi Thirunal, Ayya's devotees started their journey carrying Ayya Vaikundar to swamithoppe from Thiruvananthapuram in a Vahana.
- 1840 March 4 – They reached Swamithoppe.
- 1840 March – The Tuvayal Pandarams begins the Tuvayal Thavasu at Vakaippathi as per the instructions of Vaikundar.
- 1840 July/August – The second Muttappathi Vinchai given to Vaikundar by Narayana inside the sea.
- 1840 August/September – As per the order of God, they quit Vakaippathi and reached Muttappathi and completed the remaining phase of the Thavasu.
- 1840 August/September – The first Kodiyettru Thirunal celebrated in Swamithope pathi.
- 1840 August/September – Ayya unified the Seven Virgins into himself as per their request.
- 1840 November/December – The Six-year Tavam of Vaikundar came to an end.
- 1840 – Muthiri kinaru started immediately after the Tavam of Vaikundar (as per oral traditions).
- 1840 December – Hari Gopalan Citar woke up at night following an abnormal dream in which God commissioned him to write the Akilam by giving him the first syllable of The Kappu.
- 1841 January/February – The first Thai Thirunal of Swamithoppe Pathi begins.
- 1841 March 4 – The Ayya Vaikunda Avataram celebrated for the first time.
- 1848 February/March – Ayya along with the followers and virgins reached Ambalappathi.
- 1848 March/April – The work for the famous Tattuva Kottakai Project begins under the leadership of Perumal Nadar of Paloor.
- 1849 February/March – People celebrated the 16th Ayya Vaikunda Avataram in Ambalappathi in the Presence of Vaikundar. He also organized the Sevvay Thirunal (Tuesday Festival) in Ambalappathi.
- 1849 July/August – Ayya took the form of an age-old man with the name Roma Rishi to bring Kumari Bhakavathi to Ambalappathi. He also organized and dedicated the celebration for Kumari Bhakavathi in Ambalappathi.
- 1849 July/August – After unifying the seven deities into himself, Ayya returned to Swamithoppe.
- 1850 January/February – The foundation stone for the Thangal of Sunda Vilai laid; Ayya participated in the function.
- 1850 March 4 – The foundation stone for the Thangal of Kadambankulam laid. Ayya participated in the function; The seventeenth Ayya Vaikunda Avataram was celebrated by the people along with Ayya there.
- 1850 August/September – Ayya married Bhooma Devi and unified into himself.
- 1851 June 3 – Ayya attained Vaikundam.

== Post Incarnational era ==
- 1871 June/July – The first Flagmast of Swamithope pathi constructed.
- 1871 August/September – The first Kodiyettru Thirunal celebrated in Swamithoppe pathi.
- 1892 December – Swami Vivekananda reached Swamithoppe pathi as per some historians.
- 1939 – Akilattirattu Ammanai, for the first time released in the printed form and circulated among the people.
- 1944 August/September – The first Thirunal begins in the first Nizhal Thangal, Thangal of Chettikkudiyiruppu.
- 1956 – The king of Travancore, Chithirai Thirunal (Descandent of the Kalineesan series)visited and worshipped in the Swamithoppe Pathi .
- 1961 – The whole remainings of the previous Kali temple found at the spot of the location of Ambalappathi completely removed.
- 1975 – The "Great Masi Procession" organized by Bala Prajapathi Adikalar, from Nagercoil to Swamithoppe.
- 1978 – A new temple car dedicated to the Swamithoppe Pathi.
- 1989 – The Vaikundar Thirukkudumbam Edition of Akilattirattu Ammanai, released. Big controversy arose questioning the removal and reference of additional verses from various versions of texts of Akilam.
- 1990 – A new Flag mast constructed at Swamithoppe Pathi replacing the old one.
- 1990 October/November – The Flag mast and the Temple car included Kodiyettru Thirunal begins in Ambalappathi.
- 1993? – Ayya Vaikunda Avataram was announced as a holiday by the government for the district of Kanyakumari.
- 1994 September 17 – Some Anti-ayyavazhi elements mixed a serious poison, Pureton in the sacred water of Mutthirikkinaru.
- 1999 January 1 – The first transliterated version of Arul Nool published in Malayalam by Bala Prajapathi Adikalar.
- 2000 – The Second edition of the (Vaikundar Thiru kudumbam Version) Akilattirattu Ammanai released by Ayya Vaikundar Thirukkudumbam.
- 2006 February/March – The Ayya Vaikunda Avataram was declared official holiday for the districts of Tirunelveli and Thoothukkudi by the Tamil Nadu Government.

== See also ==
- Ayya Vaikundar
- Ayyavazhi in reports by Christian missionaries
