= Muthiri kinaru =

Coordinates: 8.118047°N 77.489828°E

Muthiri Kinaru (Tamil: முத்திரி கிணறு) is the sacred well located in the north-western corner of Swamithoppe village. This is the famous theertha of the temple. It is located half a kilometre west from the main Pathi.

Historically, this well plays a major role in joining the people in this part of the country, breaking the caste-based discrimination that once prevailed among them. Before and during the period of Lord Vaikundar, this part of the subcontinent was under the grip of feudalism, casteism, and untouchability. There were separate wells and tanks for each caste, and people from the other caste were not allowed to draw out water from those wells. As in the Vinchai, since the social aim of 'uplifting the lowly treated people in the society' occupies a major part in the spiritual mission of Vaikundar, which is projected towards the ideal Dharma Yukam, he wanted to stop this evil practice. So as the first step to reach this aim, this well was established at Swamithoppe. Apart from religious sacredness, this well was also a historical icon since it was the first well in this part of the country where people could use water freely, irrespective of their caste.

== History ==
By the completion of the Six-year Tavam of Vaikundar in 1840, the Thuvayal Thavasu practiced at Vakaippathi and Muttappathi for about one year as they reached Swamithoppe. Several ritual practices of Ayyavazhi originated from this. Some, especially the prayers were continued as followed during the Thuvayal Thavasu period, and some were originated as per the instructions of Vaikundar.

In that series, Akilathirattu speaks of that well as "the eighteen castes assembling in one place, and bathing from the same well". This refers to the prevalence of a seemingly innocuous practice of the people, gathered around Vaikundar, bathing together from the water of this well. People of different castes bathed together at this well, mindless of their social differences. Physical closeness was necessitated, mainly because of the smallness of the well. Besides bathing, they drank this water as cure for their illness. They cooked their food with the use of this water, and eat in community feast along with Vaikundar.

In the course of events, the well and its water seem to have acquired religious significance to the people of Ayyavazhi. The act of bathing, drinking, and cooking the food with this water came to be repeated with a ritual fervour. People began to consider the well a sacred one, and the water as having miraculous powers to heal sickness. A couplet from the Saattu Neettolai of Arul Nool reads as "every one is drinking the milk of the well around which miracles are growing". And by this quote, it seems that Akilam itself accredits the well as a sacred one. People consider it a religious obligation to bathe and drink at least a few drops of water from this well.

Many people and multiple castes congregated there to draw water for bathing and drinking. Lord Vaikuntar used the holy water from the well and the holy mud to cure the people of their illness.

== Social background ==
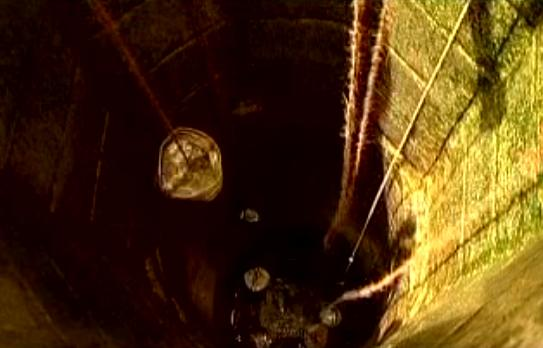
Patham drawn from Muthirikkinaru; inner view of the well

In the then Travancore society, the discriminatory laws of purity and pollution were very sensitive in places of bathing, and in acts involving the use of water. Demarcation of separate places for the different castes for bathing and drawing water, and a strict enforcement of this discriminated separation through regulations, social and political, along with a strong religious sanction, was the order of the day. As a general custom, the lower castes were prohibited from drawing water from public wells and ponds. The upper caste people had separate wells so that they could avoid the presence and pollution of the lower caste people. Those who, be it a member of the caste fold or one from outside of it, ventured to transgress these demarcated spaces were penalised with severe corporal punishments, or even eliminated unceremoniously.

It was against this background that a ritual involving the congregation of the people from different castes around a well, bathing together, and cooking their food with the water of the same well was being performed at Swamithoppe, where Ayya Vaikundar was carrying out his mission. It was an indirect challenge to the evil system of untouchability. This cluster of ritual actions set in motion an interrogation of the system of purity and pollution, and indirectly challenged the hegemonic system of discriminated separation. The ritual boundaries that had been set on the use of water was sought to be transgressed, and the strength of the traditional indoctrination on ritual impurity implied in the exchange of water from one to another, was sought to be weakened.

== Miracles ==
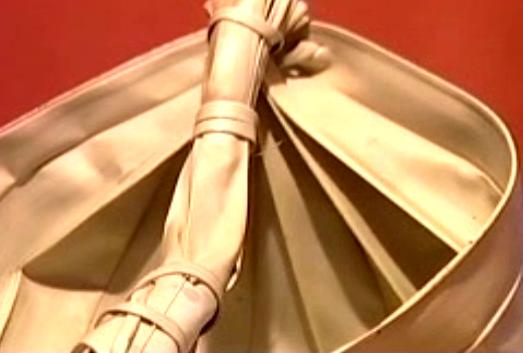
The traditional Pattai which made of Palmyra leaf, used to draw water from the holy Muthirikkinaru

Due to the attention focused on the well, malicious acts have been recorded where poison was twice placed into the water by some anti-ayyavazhi elements. One was during the period of Vaikundar and was noted in Akilam and another was in a recent time.

It is reported that Lord Vaikundar concentrated the poison into a Sivalinga and the Sivalinga remained inside the well in the first poisoning.

As per Akilathirattu, People, hearing about the poisoning reported it to Vaikundar and requested him to save them. Vaikundar informed the devotees that the water in the well was non-poisonous. People who had faith in his words drank and bathed in the well and were totally safe. Those who had no belief in his words and had drunk the water became unconscious. People rushed to the Lord and narrated the incident. Lord asked them to sprinkle the holy water on those who were unconscious. They got up as if from sleep.

Then on 17 September 1994, the first Sunday of the Tamil Month, Puratasi, poison was mixed up in the sacred water of Muthirikkinaru for the second time.

Some miscreants immersed a 5-kilogram packet of Phorate, a highly poisonous chemical, into the well. There was a smell of this chemical everywhere around the well. Some advised the devotees not to bathe in the well. But, nobody heeded it; thousands of people bathed in and drank the water. Even six-month-old babies were bathed here, but nobody was affected. The empty packet of the chemical was later retrieved and destroyed.

== As a ritual and religious symbol ==
This well is treated with more importance because it is attached to the incarnational activities of Vaikundar. To overcome the three diversities, Anava, Kanma, and Maya, one should achieve spiritual cleanliness, and it is believed that this cleanliness is obtained when one bathes from this sacred well. This well is said to be sealed by Vaikundar and will remain as an icon for the destruction of Kali.

Even today the well is too crowded to bathe. People drink this water as Patham. It is believed that the holy water from this well will process one for the life of Dharma Yukam. It is also believed that lunatics and patients, having no cure even after prolonged medical treatment and a stay in the temple, can take a bath in muthirikinaru and be cured.

=== Daily worship ===
The Muthirikkinaru is addressed in Akilam as Muthal Thalam (the primary place in ritual importance). The Payyans start their daily routine only after the religious bathing in this well. After the ceremonial bath, they used to drink the sacred water (Patham) of the Muthirikkinaru for five times and give it so for the followers for five times. Then the Payyan circumambulate the Muthirikkinaru for five times and others follow him. Chanting "Ayya Siva-siva Siva-siva Ara-hara Ara-hara", all proceed to the Pathi. This is practiced thrice a day during the morning, noon, and evening Panividais.

Also one of the important ritual actions performed by the devotees of Ayyavazhi is to take this ritual bath, drawing water from the well. This has become a ritual necessity to be gone through, before one worships at the Pathi. It is overwhelming to see the devotees throng the well to get a few buckets of water on to them and drink a few drops ceremoniously for five times and then proceed to the Pathi. This practice of bathing at the well is being addressed as Patham viduthal.

=== During festivals ===
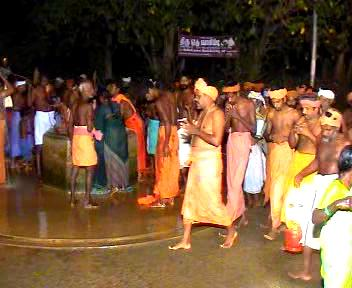
Devotees circumnavigating Muthirikkinaru at the first day of Kodiyettru Thirunal

Apart from this daily ritual, this Muthirikkinaru earns a religious significance during the eighth day of the Kodiyettru Thirunal festival. At that day, Lord Vaikundar is carried to muthirikinaru on a horse (vahana). It is believed that the God hunts kali. The ceremonial hunting of kali is done with a bow and arrow. Here, thousands of people assemble to drink the holy patham. Patham viduthal is the word used by the devotees for bathing in Muthirikinaru. There is a heavy rush to take a bath in the well on the first Sunday of the Tamil months.

Arul Nool, the secondary holy book, advises to do Dharma near this well.

During the Car festivals and during the Vaikunda Jayanthi celebrations, the worshippers are not allowed to draw water from Muthirikkinaru due to the limited size of the well and extent of the crowds that attend to worship. During those days, one or two Panividaiyalars are used to draw water from the well and to throw it onto the crowd. In this way the everyone in the crowd gets a few drops poured on their heads.

== See also ==
- Ayyavazhi religious practices
- Swamithope pathi
