= Pancha pathi =

Hindu pilgrim centers

Pancha pathi (Tamil: பஞ்ச பதி, "the five abodes of God") are the five important pilgrim centers of Ayyavazhi. These are also considered as the primary Pathis and as worship centers of Ayyavazhi with primary status. The first pathi is Swamithope pathi itself and is the headquarters of Ayyavazhi. The other Pathis are Muttappathi, Thamaraikulam Pathi, Ambalappathi and Pooppathi.

All the five of the Panchappathis are located within a Fifteen-kilometer circle of Kanyakumari, the land end of the Indian Sub-continent.

== Swamithope pathi ==
Swamithoppe is the religious headquarters of Ayyavazhi. This was considered also as primary among the Panchappathi. This was the place where The Great Tavam of Ayya took place. The land's holiness is described in Akilattirattu Ammanai that Parthiban, the legendary Arjuna made penance to get Pasupathasthiram from Lord Siva. This was also the birthplace of Veda Vyasa who wrote the Mahabharata. This was the place where the demons were burned up by Vaikundar as per Akilam. Moreover, the act of seizing the powers of witchcraft, magic etc. were conducted here.

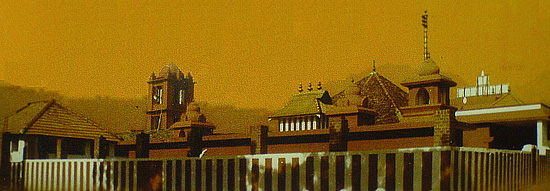
Swamithope pathi

Ayya also unified into him the Seven virgins at this place. Vaikundar is also said to have performed several miracles at Swamithoppe. Because of all these reasons this center is considered more sacred than all other pathi and also seen with high religious importance.

This is one of the most important religious centers in Tamil Nadu and attracts a huge crowd from across the country. The London Missionary Society Reports of the 19th century speaks in abundance about this Pathi and the huge attraction of crowd even from those days.

== Mutta Pathi ==
Muttappathi was the place where the second phase Thuvayal Thavasu was conducted by the followers of Ayya Vaikundar after completing the Thuvayal Thavasu for six-months in Vahaippathi as per his instructions. The seven hundred families lived as a group, constructing huts at the sea-shore; so, there prevailed group economy. The neighbours heard about this pure Vegetarian life, which is unusual particularly among the so-called lower castes. A lot of people came to witness the life of devotees. The coconut grove where Thuvayal Thavasu was conducted belonged to a pious Brahmin. Hearing about Thuvayal Thavasu, he came to that place and witnessed it. He became so attached to these principles of Ayya Vaikundar that he gave away that land to the people Ayya Vaikundar.

The present Muttappathi was established there and was under the direct control of the Payyan dynasty. Later, due to some litigations, the land was auctioned by the government. Those who got the land in the auction conducted the daily Panividai. Now, their descendants conduct the panividai and administer the Pathi which is managed by a Trust.

Also this centre earns another religious importance. Ayya Vaikundar went into the sea just before his arrest and also after the completion of his Tavam to meet his Father Vishnu for the First Muttappathi Vinchai from near this spot. So this centre is directly associated by the incarnational activities of Vaikundar. Ayyavazhi people have a believe that, it is sanctifying to take a holy dip in the sea at Muttappathi.

Every year, on the last Friday of the Tamil Month Panguni, people march from Swamithoppe in large numbers to Muttappathi. This festival is called Panguni Theertham. The elder most or others from Payyan dynasty of Swamithoppe conduct the Panividai and also the Annadharmam on that day at Muttappathi.

== Thamaraikulam Pathi ==
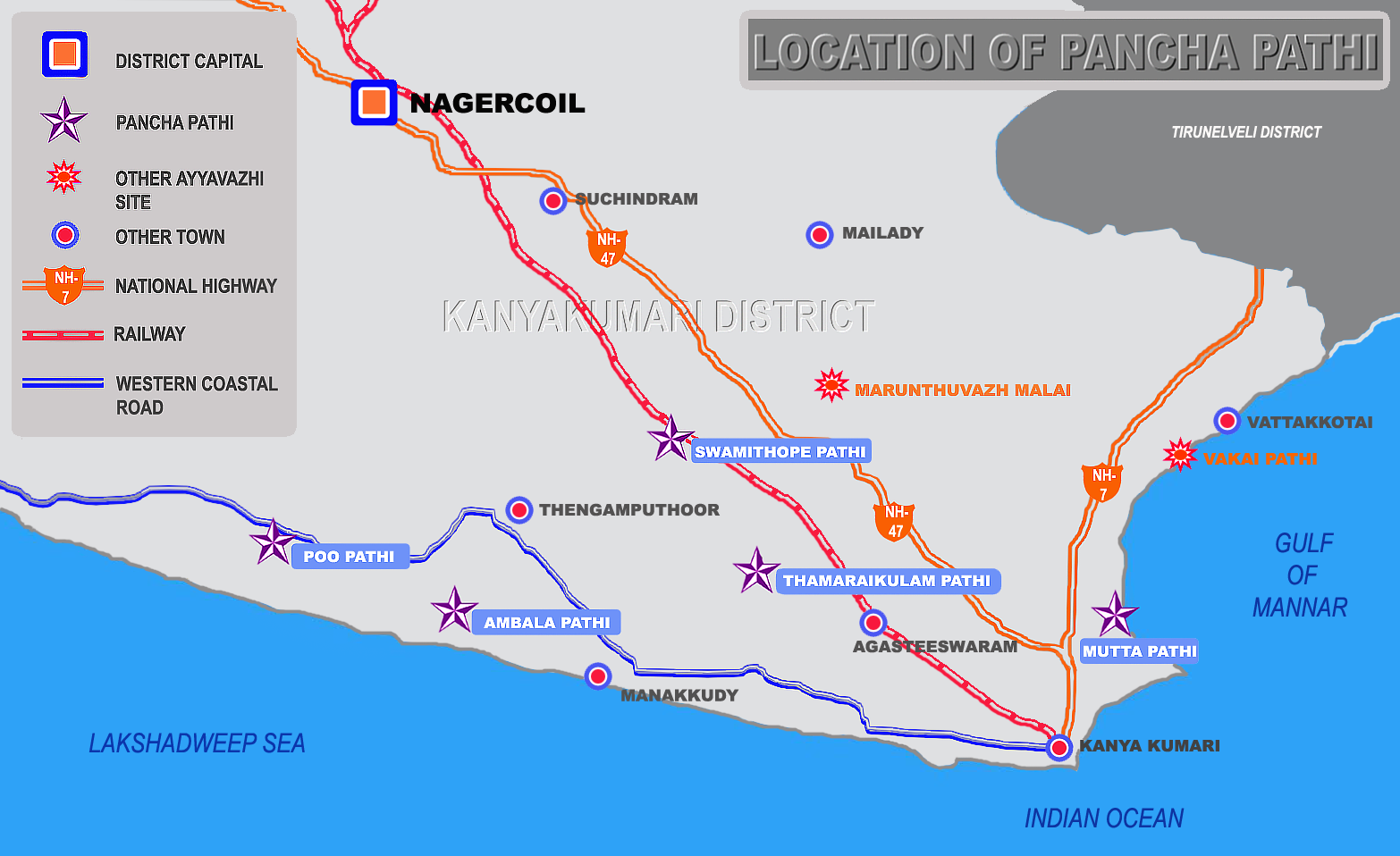
Map showing the location of Pancha Pathi in Kanyakumari district

Tamaraikulampathi is the birthplace of Hari Gopalan Citar, one of the disciples of Ayya Vaikundar. He was also called the Sahadevan. Akilattirattu Ammanai, the holy book of Ayyavazhi is told as a prophecy to Hari Gopalan Citar by God. So, he became well known of all the disciples of Ayya Vaikundar. People of this village once invited Ayya Vaikundar to their village. Ayya Vaikundar went there and he was given warm welcome and a treat. Ayya Vaikundar stayed there for a day and returned to Swamithoppe.

During the early years, Ayya Vaikundar was taken to this village in a vahana by people once in a year. The auspicious day was the last Sunday of the Tamil month Panguni. In those days, people celebrated this occasion as a festival. This practice has been discontinued for the past fifty years. Daily Panividai is being conducted here. Now, there are Vahanas made of wood for the festivals.

Thamaraikulam Pathi is situated in the South Thamaraikulam, one kilometer south of Swamithoppe. One can reach this place from Nagercoil or Kanyakumari by Town bus. It is fourteen kilometers away from Nagercoil.

== Ambala Pathi ==
Ayya Vaikundar after the Tavam, went to a place called Pallam near Manakkudy and stayed there for two years. This place is called as Ambalappathi. Ayya Vaikundar was a Shiva-sorub (taking the form of Siva) at this place. Here, an ambalam was constructed with Ninety-six beams meeting at a wooden pot mounted at center and Ayya Vaikundar preached from that Ambalam. Here, as a Shiva-sorubi, Ayya assumed the powers of Parvathi and Bhagavathi.

As Muruga, he assumed the powers of Valli and Dheivanai. As Brahma, he also assumed the powers of Madaikattal. It was from this place that the devotees took Ayya on horseback to such villages as Kadambankulam and Pambankulam. Ayya established Nizhal Thangals in these villages. Later, at the end of the second year, Ayya Vaikundar returned to Swamithoppe.

Later, on this very spot the owners of the land constructed a Pathi and conducted daily Panividai. Now, this Pathi is managed by the descendants of the people who constructed the Pathi. Every year Car festivals are conducted in this Pathi. There are many Vahanas to carry Ayya Vaikundar around the Pathi. This Pathi is located ten Kilometers south of Nagercoil. There is a direct bus service from Nagercoil to this Pathi.

Since Ayya Vaikundar all the different divine powers into himself and revealed his supremacy at this spot, this is the most important Pilgrim centers of Ayyavazhi people, next to Swamithoppe. This Pathi is also called Pallathu pathi and Mulakunda pathi.

== Poo Pathi ==
Ayya Vaikundar spend his last six years of the incarnational period at Swamithoppe. He lived as a normal human person. He maintained fields and groves. He also maintained cattle. Bhoomadevi (the goddess of Earth) as Poomadanthai was living at a place near Eathamozhi. Some devotees wanted to unite this divine couple. But there was stiff opposition from the relatives of the girl. Poomadanthai was chanting the praise of Ayya Vaikundar and proved that she was extraordinary.

Later, the relatives called Ayya Vaikundar to their village and give the girl's hand in a marriage to Vaikundar. Poomadanthai was happily united with Ayya Vaikundar. This Poomadanthai was one among the Seven deities unified into Vaikundar and the only deity unified not at Ambalappathi. Ayya Vaikundar took rest there in a grove full of beautiful laurel trees. Akilam says that, the buds of this trees were like pearls and the place was very cool.

Later, the devotees established a Pathi at this place as per the instructions of Vaikundar found in Akilam and it is called as Poopathi. Festivals are conducted every year and this Pathi is owned by the village and maintained by the village committee. Poopathi is located about ten kilometers south of Nagercoil and Eathamozhi.

== See also ==
- Worship centers of Ayyavazhi
- Pathi
- Ayya Vaikundar
- Panchalinga Darshana
