= Thamaraikulam Pathi =

Coordinates: 8°6′7.48″N 77°29′53.06″E

Thamaraikulam Pathi (Tamil: தாமரைகுளம் பதி) is one among the Pancha pathi, the five holy places of Ayyavazhi. The Ari Gopalan Citar, who wrote the Akilam, was born here.

Thamaraikulam Pathi was built by (the present construction) Pathi's first Guru. Ponnaranainjavan Udaiyakutti in his land. Arigopalancidar wrote Akilathirattu Ammanai in Thamaraikulam Pathi. This was considered a Pathi because the Akilam was written down here, which was one among the incarnational activities of Vaikundar. When Ayya Vaikudar came out from the sea (after his first vinchai), he decided and planned to do meditation here only. This is the first place he visited and started his first pathi. This is the First pathi in the All Pancha pathis. During the time of Ayya Vaikunder, devotees took him to this Pathi once a year in a Vahana.

== Prayers and Festivals ==
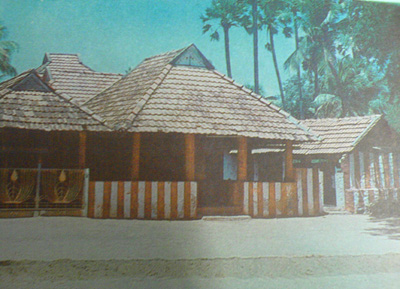
East view of Thamaraikulam Pathi.

Like the other Pathis, the Panividais are conducted thrice a day, the special panividais are on every Sundays. The Kodiyettru Thirunal is celebrated here during the Tamil month of Panguni, starting from the second Friday of Panguni and lasting eleven days. The Thirdu Eadu-vasippu here is celebrated for seventeen days in the Tamil month of Karthigai. At the same time, the same festival was conducted in Swamithope pathi. Since the Akilam was written down here, only during this fest is the pathi considered to have a higher sacrament than the Swamithope pathi. The Original Palm-leaf version of Akilam is read out here for seven days. Then, worshippers as a procession, used to bring it to Swamithoppe pathi on the last Sunday of the Tamil Month of Karthigai, and after completing it, read for seventeen days again return it to Thamaraikulam pathi, and complete it by reading the rest in ten days.

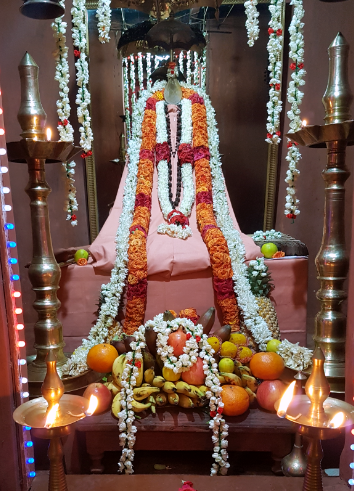
Thamaraikulam Pathi - Palliyarai

Another important festival celebrated by Ayyavazhi followers centering Thamaraikulam Pathi is the 'Vahana bhavani' (procession carrying Ayya in a Vahana) to Thamaraikulam from Swamithope pathi. It is a one-day festival celebrated on the last Sunday of the Tamil month Panguni. On that day, people from Swamithoppe marched in great numbers to Muttapathi under the leadership of Payyan, carrying Ayya in a Vahana. It was in practice right from the time of Vaikundar.

== Location and religious status ==
This Pwathi is located 8 km Southeast of Nagercoil, 7 km Northwest of Kanyakumari. It was also located 2 km south of Swamithope. It also lies 3 km west of the historical Agastheeswaram. There is a direct bus service from Nagercoil and Kanyakumari to here.

This is where Ayya commissioned the Citar to write down the Akilam by telling the first syllable of 'The Kappu', of Akilam was considered with equal importance as other Pathis. Also, Akilam accredits it as a 'Pathi'.

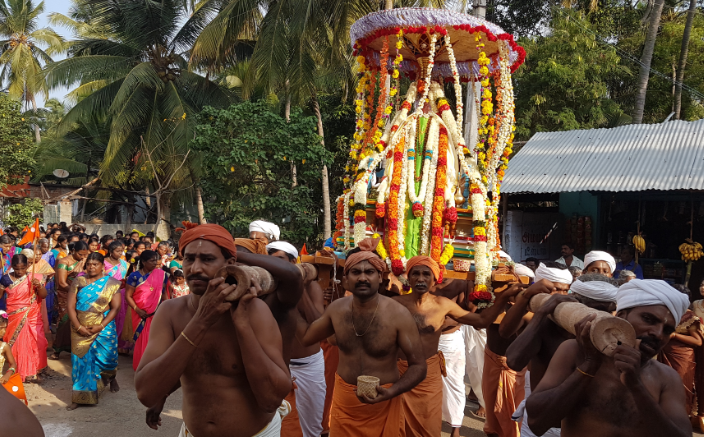
Ayya vahana bavani with Village people & Guru Family members, January 2019

== Architecture and Structure ==
Like all other Pathis, the Palliyarai forms the inner and central structure of the whole architecture. An inner corridor, which allows the worshippers to circumambulate, surrounds the Palliyarai. In front of this inner corridor, is a hall where the prayers are conducted. Sivayu Medai is located southeast of Palliyarai.

== Administration ==
Due to many issues, the temple is now under the administration/control of the Hindu Religious and Charitable Endowments Department; however, daily panividai and festivals are handled by traditional Thamarai pathi parambarai Guru family members. Now the situation is better since it's administered by the Government of Tamil Nadu (Hindu Religious and Charitable Endowments Department), and village separatists are not involved in temple administration.

== See also ==
- Pancha pathi
- Ayya Vaikundar
- Pathi
- Ayyavazhi mythology
- List of Ayyavazhi-related articles
