= Theerthakkarai =

Holy place in Ayyavazhi

Coordinates: 8.092663°N 77.564208°E

Theerthakkarai is a holy place of Ayyavazhi. It is located 0.6 kilometres (0.37 mi) south-east of the main pathi at Muttappathi at the end of the Muttapathi road at the rocky-shores. It is the second holiest sea-theertham according to Akilam. This is the place where the second and third Vinchais of Vaikundar took place. It was in memory of this event the Panguni Theertham is conducted.

== See also ==
- Vinchai to Vaikundar
- Ayyavazhi rituals
