= Ambala Pathi =

Holy place in India

Ambala Pathi (Tamil: அம்பல பதி), also known as Pallathu pathi or Moolakunda pathi, is one of the primary pathi of the Ayyavazhi, and the second important pilgrim center of Ayyavazhi and the place where Ayya Vaikundar is said to have unified all divine power into himself by symbolic marriages.

According to Ayyavazhi legends, Ayya Vaikundar, an incarnation of god, as per the instruction in Vinchai by Narayana unified six female deities into himself in various forms such as Siva, Brahma, etc. Because of these events, this Pathi obtained religious importance next to Swamithope pathi. Before this Pathi there existed a Kali temple at the spot. It was changed by Ayya into a Pathi.

Akilam gives almost an equal status and importance for Ambalappathi with Swamithope pathi.

== History ==
Vaikundar, after incarnating from the sea, came to Detchanam carrying the Great Tavam and other incarnational activities. Before, during the Vinchai, Vaikundar had promised to Narayana that he would go to Ambalappathi after completing the incarnational activities in Swamithope. Narayana sensed that it was now time for that, but felt that he had no right to order Vaikundar directly. So Narayan decided to remind Vaikundar indirectly. For that, he ordered Samala devi to take away two of the Seven Virgins. When two of them died, the whole mass of people were shocked and assembled before Vaikundar.

A man in the midst of the crowd stood up and told about the dream he had had a few days before. In the dream, Narayana said, "Vaikundar had forgotten the work which was given by me. His duty of destroying the Kali has been forgotten by him because of his joyful climate with the virgins". Hearing this Vaikundar proceeded towards Ambalappathi.

He stayed at Pallam near Manakkudy for two years for completing the incarnational activities. This place is called Ambalappathi. Ayya Vaikundar was a Shiva-sorub (taking the form of Siva) at this place. As a Shiva-sorubi, Ayya assumed the powers of Parvathi and Bhagavathi. As Muruga, he assumed the powers of Valli and Dheivanai. As Brahma, he also assumed the powers of Madaikattal. It was from this place that the devotees took Ayya on horseback to such villages as Kadambankulam and Pambankulam. Ayya established Nizhal Thangals in these villages. Later, at the end of the second year, Ayya Vaikundar returned to Swamithoppe.

== Legendary ==
The former name of Ambalappathi was Kurali Vadalivilai, and the land is owned by Latchumanan Potthi. Once there was Siva and Kali temple where the Ambalappathi is located now. To conduct pooja in the temple this, Letchumanan Potthi use to come daily to this temple. At that time, Ayya in the form of a mendicant, sit beneath a Pipal tree, pretend to be a newcomer and use to collect information about this temple with Latchumanan Potthi. Then he asked Latchumanan Potthi to open the temple. Hearing this Latchumanan Potthi asked five panam (a then currency) to open, and five Panam to close; so totally ten panam to show the deity. Ayya replied, "If the one who present inside is my sister, then the door will open itself." The door opened immediately, and Ayya went inside.

Then after when Ayya asked Latchumanan Potthi for some water to drink. Potthi answered that it was hard to fetch water in that jungle. Hearing this Ayya pointed the Perambu (cane) to a spot there and asked Potthi to dig. When he did so water squeezed from the earth. It was this the present Muthirikkinaru of Ambalappathi.

Then for some days Ayya stayed there and performed several miracles beneath a Pipal tree there. After, Latchumanan Potthi donated that land to Ayya.

== Location and Religious status ==
Later, on this very spot the followers of Ayya constructed a Pathi and conducted daily Panividai. Now, this Pathi is managed by the descendants of the people who constructed the Pathi. Every year, Kodiyettru Thirunal including Car festivals are conducted in this Pathi. There are many Vahanas to carry Ayya Vaikundar around the Pathi. It lies 8 kilometers south-east to Nagercoil, the capital of Kanyakumari district and 11 kilometers west to Kanyakumari, the southern tip of the Indian sub-continent. It also lies halfway between the towns of Rajakkamangalam and Kanyakumari on the Western Coastal Road. There is a direct bus service from Nagercoil to this Pathi. Ambala Pathi is located at 8.05°N 77.27°E

Since Ayya Vaikundar unified all the different divine powers into himself and revealed his supremacy here in Ambala Pathi, this is one of the most important Pilgrim centers for Ayyavazhi people, next to Swamithoppe. Akilam the primary scripture of Ayyavazhi, gives though not a greater, but an equal status for Ambalappathi with Swamithope pathi. This Pathi is also called Pallathu pathi and Mulakunda pathi.

== Architecture and Structure ==
The Palliyarai of Ambalappathi is said to be constructed during the period of Ayya. It was surrounded by the inner corridor. This inner corridor is called Tatuva Kottagai and it earn its name from its unique architecture planning. It was a tiled roof structure and is designed that 96 wooden beams starting from the end of the corridor and converge into a single wooden pot mounted at the center of the roof, which symbolises the 96 Tatvas of the human body. There is no other external support for this roof other that the four walls of the corridor.

In front of this inner corridor, there is a hall in which the prayers are conducted. The Vahana purai is in the left and the Unpan purai is located right to the central hall. Vadakku vaasal, the northern entrance is located on the right of the Palliyarai. And the Sivaye medai is located left to the central prayer hall. The Flag mast is placed in front of the prayer hall. The outer corridor is constructed enclosing all these. The Thear mandapam, which houses the temple car is located 100 feet east to the prayer hall.

The Muthirikkinaru is located 50 meters north-eastern corrnor of the Pathi. Near this well there is a separate monument constructed similar to Hindu architecture near the pipal tree, which is believed to be the place where Ayya use to rest as per a legendary. But this structure doesn't include any images or idols of god-heads of Hinduism. But constitutes only the images of Ayyavazhi symbols. The Four-car street surrounds the whole of the Pathi, excluding Muthirikkinaru.

== Prayers and Festivals ==
Though the Panivdais are conducted thrice a day the special panividais are on every Tuesday. Every Tuesday is considered a festival day in Ambalappathi. The Akilam is read during these festival days. At the end, the Vahanam eduppu is conducted. The festival then closes with Anna Dharmams.

The Kodiyettru Thirunal in Ambalappathi is conducted during the Tamil month of Aippsi (October/November). Ayya Vaikunda Avataram is also celebrated in a grand scale in Ambalappathi. The Thiru Edu Vasippu, the festival during which Akilam is read melodiously, also takes place.

== See also ==
- Pancha pathi
- Ayya Vaikundar
- Pathi
- Akilattirattu Ammanai
