= Mutta Pathi =

Ayyavazhi center of worship

Mutta Pathi (Tamil: முட்ட பதி), is one of the Pancha pathi, which are the primary centers for worship of the Ayyavazhi. This is the third important pilgrim center of Ayyavazhi. This place earn the religious importance in Akilam from the event that, Ayya Vaikundar is given two Vinchais here by Narayana under the Sea; One just before the arrest of Vaikundar by Swathi Thirunal and the second after the completion of Thuvayal Thavasu.

Also, this is the place where the second phase of Thuvayal Thavasu is carried out by Thuvayal Pandarams after completing it in Vakaippathi for about six-months. Alongside of Swamithoppe, it attracts a huge amount of devotees annually across southern India.

== Legendary and History ==
After the Trail with the King of Travancore, Vaikundar reached Swamithoppe and instructed his followers to go for the Thuvayal Thavasu at Vakaippathi. As per, 700 families participated in the mass-austrity. They completed a Tavam of six-months. Then as per the instruction of Ayya in the dream of one of the participants, they all moved to Mutta pathi.

That place was then owned by Siva Loganatha Iyer who worked in the palace of the King of Travancore. God appeared to him in his dream and order him to grant that land to the Thuvayal pandarams. So he went to the spot where he wondered to witness the whole mass of 700 families. He by doubting the geniunity of their Tavam, he asked them that, "If your austrity is true make all the coconuts from these trees to fall off. If so I will give away this land for you people to construct a temple." Hearing this they all pray sincerely towards God facing the Sea. Wonderfully, all the Coconuts fall of before the closure of the prayer. Iyer was moved by witnessing this scene and grant that 1-acre (4,000 m^{2}) of land for them.

This Mutta Pathi was the place where Krishna during the Dvapara Yuga, constructed a fort in order for protecting the Pandavas from the Kauravas and ruled over it. Akilam calls it as 'Muttappathi Nadu' and also treats this place with high Sacrement and importance.

== Location and religious status ==
This Pathi is located 14 km South-east to Nagercoil 3 km North to Cape Comorin in the Sea-shore. It was also located 7 km east to Swamithope. It also lies half-a-way between the historical Circular fort and the Kanyakumari the Southern tip of the Sub-continent. There is a direct bus service from Nagercoil to here. Mutta Pathi is located at 8.05°N 77.33°E

The present construction was established there and was under the direct control of the Payyan dynasty and later, due to some litigations, the land was auctioned by the government. Those who got the land in the auction conducted the daily Panividai. Now, their descendants conduct the panividai and administer the Pathi and is managed by a Trust. The sea near this place is called the 'milk-ocean' . Theerthakkarai, located 0.6 km south-east of Muttapathi is the second holiest sea theertham as per Akilam. It was sanctified by the fact that the second as well as the third Vinchai to Vaikundar is offered here.

Regarding religious importance, this Pathi is important next to Ambala Pathi and Swamithope pathi, since the second and third Vinchais, which are the important instructions for the incarnational activities of Vaikundar was given by Narayana from here. Also this center gains additionally the importance that, the Thuvayal thavasu was also held here, though the first phase of it was conducted in Vakaippathi. Then it was also important and sacred even before the incarnation of Vaikundar right from the Dvapara Yuga, Since Narayana as Krishna ruled this place.

== Architecture and Structure ==
As all other Pathis, also here in Mutta Pathi, the Palliyarai forms the inner and the central spot of the whole architecture. An inner corridor, which allows the worshippers to circum-ambulate, surrounds the Palliyarai. In front of this inner corridor, there is a hall in which the prayers are conducted. Sivayu Medai is located in the south of Palliyarai and the Vahana Purai (which house Vahanas) in the Far South. The Flag pole is placed some 50 feet (15 m) apart from Palliyarai. Then the Outer-corridor surrounds all these which allows the worshippers to circum-ambulate the whole Pathi.

== Prayers and Festivals ==
Though the Panividais are conducted thrice a day the special panividais are on every Sundays. The Kodiyetru thirunal is celebrated here during the Tamil Month of Panguni starting from the second Friday of Panguni and last for eleven days. The Thiru-eadu Vasippu here is celebrated here for seventeen days starting from the second Friday of the Tamil month of Karthigai.

Another important festival celebrated by Ayyavazhi followers centering Muttappathi is the Panguni Theertham. It is a One-day-festival celebrated on the Second Friday of Tamil month Panguni. On that day people from Swamithoppe march in great numbers to Muttapathi under the leadership of Payyan.

== See also ==
- Theerthakkarai
- Pancha pathi
- Ayya Vaikundar
- Pathi
- Ayyavazhi mythology
- List of Ayyavazhi-related articles
