= Panguni Theertham =

Panguni Theertham is a festival which is celebrated in honour of the Tavam of Vaikundar. This festival is also called "Tava Dinam". On this day a procession starts from Swamithoppe Pathi to Muttappathi. This festival is celebrated on the Tamil month of Panguni.
