= Thamaraikulam =

Thamaraikulam (transl. Lotus Pond in Tamil) may refer to:

- Thamaraikulam Pathi, a Hindu (Ayyavazhi) religious place in Kanyakumari district, Tamil Nadu, India;
- Thamaraikulam, Theni, a panchayat town in the Periyakulam taluk of the Theni district, Tamil Nadu, India;
- Thamaraikulam, Tiruvannamalai, a municipality in the town of Tiruvannamalai, Tamil Nadu, India;
- Thenthamaraikulam, neighbourhood in Kanyakumari district, Tamil Nadu;
- Thamarai Kulam, a 1959 Indian Tamil-language film.

== See also ==
- Lotus Pond (disambiguation)
- Thamarakkulam (disambiguation)
