= Ayya Vaikunda Avataram =

Tamil festival

The Ayya Vaikunda Avataram or Vaikunda Jayanthi (Tamil: அய்யா வைகுண்ட அவதாரம் or வைகுண்ட ஜெயந்தி - Incarnation of Lord Vaikundar) is a festival celebrated by the followers of Ayyavazhi on the 20th day of the Tamil month of Masi, the date on which the Ayyavazhi followers believe that Lord Narayana himself incarnated as Vaikundar during an encounter with a deity Goddess Lakshmi, he was beget inside the sea and arose from the sea of Thiruchendur on Kollam Year 1008 at 20th day of Tamil Month Masi (1 March 1833 CE, Friday). He took the human form as Narayana Pantaram at Tharuvaiyur near seashore to destroy the evil spirit of Kali and transform the Kaliyukam into Dharma Yukam.

This is the only Ayyavazhi festival which is celebrated simultaneously in all worship centres of Ayyavazhi on 19th Masi, the day before the date of incarnation of Vaikundar. The Vaikunda Jayanthi festival is a restricted holiday for the states of Tamil Nadu and Kerala. It is also a local holiday for the districts of Kanyakumari, Tirunelveli and Tuticorin districts. The Great Masi Procession from Nagercoil to Swamithope on the Avatar day is one among the largest religious processions in Tamil Nadu.

== Processions ==
A grand procession originates from Thiruchendur to Nagercoil on the 19th of Masi representing the way of Vaikundar after the Avataram to Detchanam, and another procession starts from Thiruvananthapuram to Nagercoil, on the same date representing the release of Lord Vaikundar from the jail of Singarathoppe. Both meet at Nagercoil in the evening and at the next early morning, on the 20th of Masi the Vaikunda Jayanthi Orvalam originates from Nagercoil to Swamithoppe with several devotees. This is one of the largest festivals of the district which attracts a large crowd.

=== Thiruchendur Procession ===
As per the scriptures of Ayyavazhi the incarnation of Vaikundar was from the Sea of Tiruchendur on 20th of Masi. So on celebrating this event the nationwide followers of Ayyavazhi assemble at Tiruchendur on that day (19th Masi or 3 March) at Avatharappathi, the Pathi erected on the sea-shore where Vaikundar is believed to be incarnated.

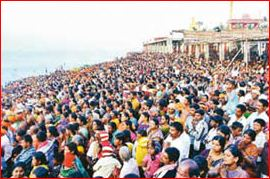
181-st Ayya Vaikunda Avataram, Avathara Pathi, Tiruchendur

On 18th Masi, (previous day) night the festival at Tiruchendur is celebrated in a grand scale and several conferences, cultural programs and Anna Dharmams were held and the celebration goes on for the full night. Then on the 19th Masi morning, around 8 O' clock the people assembled there will take a holy bath in the Sea of Thiruchendur under the leadership of Avathara pathi Dharmaghartta's. This practise of taking bath (holy dip) at Thiruchendur on the day of Vaikunda Avatar is considered sacred. The Dharmaghartta's applies sacred 'Namam' on everybody's forehead. Then around 9 O' clock the procession starts from Tiruchendur under the leadership of Dharmaghartta's. The people follows Dharmaghartta's chanting "Ayya Siva-siva Siva-siva ara-kara ara-kara". Several vehicles such as trucks, vans and cars follow the procession.

The procession goes through Seerkatchi, Nainarpathu, Udangudi, Chettiarpuram, Theriyoor, Santhayadi, Kottankadu, Muthukrishnapuram, Padukkapathu, Thattarmadam, Thisayanvilai and reaches Erumaikulam at noon. Here the people participate in Anna Dharmam. Then, the procession starts from here and travels through Ayankulam, Karaichuthupudur, Koodankulam, Chettikulam, Chalaipudur, Avaraikulam, Ambalavanapuram, Aralvaimozhi, Thovalai and reaches Athalavilai.

=== Thiruvananthapuram Procession ===
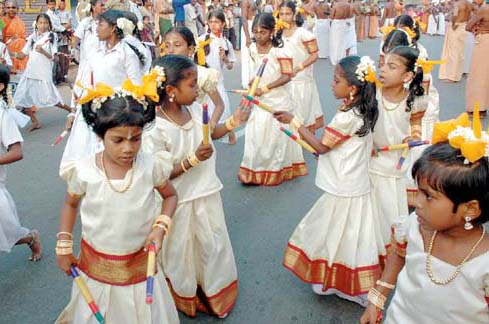
Kids dancing during 'The Great Masi Procession.'

Lord Vaikundar, was released from the Jail of Singarathoppe on 19th Masi, (3 March) after the trial with the king of Travancore, Swathi Thirunal. After the release Lord was carried in a Vahana to Swamithoppe, by his followers. So on celebrating this event the people used to go to Thiruvananthapuram on that day and go as a procession to Swamithoppe.

Though religiously, this celebration is not associated with the incarnation of Vaikundar, since it coincides with that day it too is commonly seen as an incarnational fest and is celebrated in the same vein. Though this was an on-foot procession for some years, now it was changed as a vehicle procession. Most of the people who participate in this procession are from Kerala. Like wise the Tiruchendur procession.

The procession starts from East Fort to Nagercoil through the Thiruvananthapuram - Kanyakumari Highway (NH - 47). It passes through the towns of Balaramapuram, Parasala, Kaliyakkavilai, Marthandam, and Thuckalay and finally reaches Athalavilai around 6.30 pm.

== Celebration in Nagercoil ==
Both the Thiruchendur and Thiruvananthapuram processions unifies at Athalavilai. The Vaikunda Jyothi is lighted on the top of a hillock Vaikunda Malai at Athalavilai. Then the procession proceeds to Nagercoil. A religious conference is held there in Nagercoil. Eminent persons participate in the conference. It is followed by cultural and religious programs etc. Ayyavazhi devotees from all over the nation stays here over the night.

== The Great Masi Procession ==
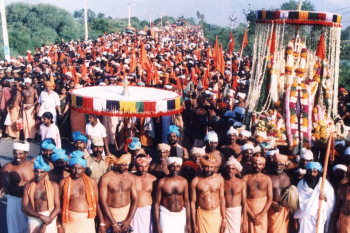
'The Great Masi Procession' from Nagercoil to Swamithope.

On the next day on 20th of Masi, (4 March) 'The Great Masi Procession' begins early in the morning from Nagercoil. The Dharmaghartta's usually will lead the procession. A decorated vahana is carried in front of the procession in which the Akilathirattu Ammanai (palm-leaf version) is sacredly placed. This is an on-foot procession and people walk following the vahana, chanting Ayya 'Siva-siva Siva-siva Ara-kara Ara-kara' . The participants will hold a saffron flag on their hands. Decorated Elephants and horses participate in this procession.

The procession goes through Edalakudi, Suchindrum, Vazukamparai, Ethankadu, North Thamaraikulam. As a sign of religious harmony, people of different faiths, Christians at Kottar; Muslims at Edalakkudi; and Hindus at Suchindram; welcome the procession by offering churul or garlands on the way. The procession reaches Swamithoppe at 12 noon and goes to the Muthirikkinaru first and then through the four car streets (Ratha veethi) of Swamithope pathi. Then it goes around the Santhana veethi, the inner-circumambulating route of pathi (shown in the blue print above). Before entering the Pathi the people hand over the flags at the pathi.

A part of worshippers in the Procession

Lakhs of Ayyavazhi followers participate in this procession, and thousands of vehicles follow. This is one of the largest festivals of the state which attracts a huge crowd beyond the state.

This day was announced as a holiday by the government of Tamil Nadu for the districts of Kanyakumari from 1993 and for Tirunelveli and Tuticorin from the year 2006.

== Other processions ==
Also, several other Pathis too conduct processions on that day. Apart from these, the festival is also celebrated all over Tamil Nadu and Kerala grandly with processions in some Thangals including in Chennai in which thousands participate.

== See also ==
- List of Ayyavazhi-related articles
- Ayyavazhi mythology
- Ayya Vaikundar
- Avatharappathi
- Singarathoppe
- Swamithope pathi
