= Poo Pathi =

Poo Pathi (Tamil: பூப்பதி) is one of the Pancha pathi, which are the primary worship centers and holy places of Ayyavazhi. As the incarnational activity of Vaikundar, the marriage with Poomadanthai, the Goddess of Earth was the event that took place here. This Poomadanthai was the final deity unified by Vaikundar into himself, symbolizing the destruction of Kali from the world (earth).

Also some historians view that this was previously a Siva temple from which it was changed as a Pathi.

== History ==
The village Soorangudi is situated east to Eathamozhi in the Kanyakumari district. Once a rich man named Sri rangan lived there, who had only one daughter. After she matured she remained only in the house, since during those days young ladies were not allowed to come out of the residence. At that time, informed by Vaikundar about the divine birth of such a virgin, the Citars of Vaikundar went to Sri rangan's house with a proposal for her from Vaikundar who was then acting as a Pandaram.

They gave the details about Vaikundar to Sri rangan. The moment he heard that the man for whom the people had come for, is an Age-old person, he grew angry and along with his workmen, attacked them severely and tied them to a pillar.

Then following a dialogue with the wisemen of the village, he released them. The citars came weeping, and walked eastwards to meet Vaikundar. At that time they met Vaikundar at a place called Naraiyan vilai. Ayya was seated under the shade of Laurel trees and asked about the happenings. The citars told what had happened. Hearing this Vaikundar said, "My women will come here." At the next moment the daughter of Sri rangan went there with her hair uncombed. Following her was a group of people.

Following them, Sri rangan and his wife came running and fell on the feet of Vaikundar and said,

"Your holiness, she was the one and only daughter given by God to us. She took only vegetarian food right from her childhood. She led a divine life by bathing and worshipping twice a day. She was not interested in marriage. Under such circumstance, when thine Citars came with the proposal addressing thineself as a Pandaram, I grew angry. When I beat them, my daughter cried out as if all beatings fell on her. Afterwards we can't control her and she ran towards here. So please pardon us. Please accept her."

Hearing this, Vaikundar advised him for his ignorance of the divine birth of his daughter. He said that she was the incarnation of the Bhooma Devi the goddess of Earth. She was performing austerity towards God to marry her and to unify her into himself. And so fulfilling that, the above drama is played out.

Vaikundar married her under the shade of the laurel trees. The trees threw flowers over the couple, wishing them well. The devas praised the couple and threw flowers over them, and since then that place is called Poo Pathi, where 'Poo' means flower in Tamil Language. Afterwards, Ayya along with Bhooma devi returned to Swamithoppe, where the followers gave them a warm welcome.

Later the devotees established a Pathi at this place and it is called as Poo pathi. Festivals are conducted every year and this temple is owned by the village and maintained by the village committee. Poopathi is located about ten kilometers south of Nagercoil near Eathamozhi.

== Festivals ==
Also apart from 'The Great Masi Procession' from Nagercoil to Swamithope pathi, there is also a procession conducted from Poo Pathi to Ambala Pathi, which was organised by unifying the different processions from western parts of Kanyakumari district.

The Thiru Eadu-Vasippu is conducted here starting from 2nd of the Tamil Month of Karthigai and will continue for about seventeen days. The celebration of Ayya Vaikunda Avatharam is celebrated for two days here on 19th and the 20th of the Tamil Month of Masi. Anna dharmam is conducted during all festival days. A bus facility is available for this Pathi from Nagercoil.

The special feature here is the Laurel trees. And Ayya unified Poomadanthai into him only under the shade of these laurel trees. Also some historians view that, this was once a Siva temple. Ayya Vaikundar changed it as Poo Pathi. The previous temple was called as Kalaswami temple. Presently there is the tomb of Kala Swami, west to the present Pathi. The Pathi is facing east ward. There is an old pipal tree on the front of the Pathi.

== Location ==
Poo Pathi is situated near Naraiyan vilai, 4 km east to Eathamozhi in a natural atmosphere. This Pathi is situated 14 km west to Kanyakumari and 7 km south to Nagercoil. It also lies half-a-way between the towns of Muttom and Kanyakumari in the Western Coastal Road. This pathi is also one km apart from the Arabian Sea in the north. It was also located 7 km south-west to Swamithope pathi.

== See also ==
- Ayya Vaikundar
- Pathi
- Worship centers of Ayyavazhi
- Pancha pathi
- List of Ayyavazhi-related articles
