= Muhilankudieruppu =

- village
- Location in Tamil Nadu, India Muhilankudieruppu (India)
- Coordinates: 8.100°N 77.541°E
- Country: India
- State: Tamil Nadu
- District: Kanyakumari

Government
  - Village head: Mr. R S parthasarathi & Mr. Appasamy

Area
  - Total: 25.89 km^{2} (10.00 sq mi)
- Elevation: 0–300 m (0–984 ft)

Population (2007)
  - Total: 1,678
  - Density: 165/km^{2} (430/sq mi)

Languages
  - Official: Tamil
- Time zone: UTC+5:30 (IST)
- PIN: 629 701
- Telephone code: 914652
- Vehicle registration: TN 74
- Website: www.muhilankurieruppu.com

Muhilankudieruppu is a village located in Agasteeswaram Taluk, Kanyakumari District, Tamil Nadu, India. Located 4 km from Kanyakumari and 16 km from Nagercoil (capital town of Kanyakumari on the road connecting Kanyakumari with Nagercoil and nearest city Trivandrum (Kerala). The village is surrounded by paddy fields, coconut groves, element enriched and beautiful sea shore (Indian Ocean). Further, this village has a pleasant climate throughout the year and benefited by both north east and south west monsoons. Muhilai is divided into two parts, West Muhilai (mela) and East Muhilai (keezha). Keezha muhilai people worship Hindu Goddess Devi Mutharamman and mela muhilai people worship the Swamy Sriman Ayya Narayanaswamy. Nearly two thousand people live here and most of the people are well-educated; some work as doctors, engineers, scientists all over the world. Muhilankudieruppu has an average literacy rate of 94%, far higher than the national average of 59.5%: male literacy is 97%, and female literacy is 91%. The Holy place of Swamythoppu pathy (Ayyavazhi) is located near Muhilankudierrupu, 4 km away.

== Agriculture ==
Major crops under cultivations: Rice, Coconut, Banana, Mango, Tamarind and Cashew

== Schools ==
- Government High School, Elanthaiyadivilai
- Government Primary School, Elanthaiyadivilai
- Government Kindergarten (Pallar Palli)

== Industries ==
Coir Industries

== Major festivals ==
- Chithirai Thiruvizha (10 days) - Devi Mutharamman temple (Every year month of May)
- Karthigai Thiruvizha (16 days) - Ayya Sriman Narayanaswamy temple (Month of November)
- Sudalaimada Swamy Kodaivizha - Throughout the year
- Pongal Celebration (3–4 days) - Sports and cultural activities
