= Lotus Bridge (disambiguation) =

Lotus Bridge is a cross-border bridge linking Macau with mainland China.

Lotus Bridge may also refer to:

- Five-Pavilion Bridge, also known as Lotus Bridge, a footbridge in the Slender West Lake National Park in Jiangsu, China
- Lotus Bridge, 2026 studio album by The Monochrome Set

== See also ==
- Lotus Pond (disambiguation)
