= Swamithope Pathi =

Swamithoppe Pathi
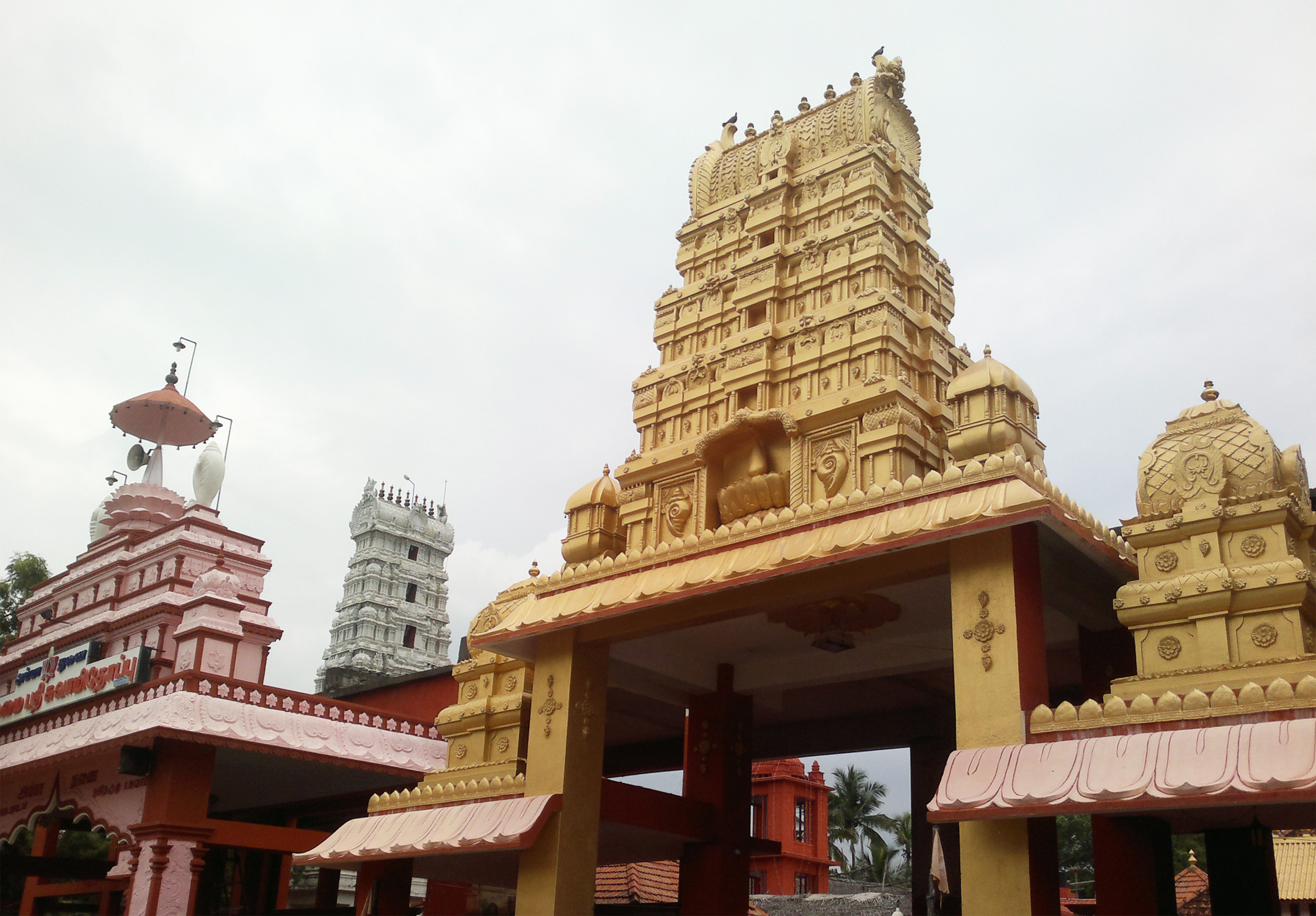
- Western Entrance

- Location in Tamil Nadu

Religion
- Affiliation: Hinduism
- District: Kanyakumari
- Deity: Vaikundar (Trimurthi), Lakshmi, Narayana
- Festivals: Ayya Vaikunda Avataram; Kodiyettru Thirunal; Panguni Theertham

Location
- Location: Swamithoppe
- State: Tamil Nadu
- Country: India
- Coordinates: 8°7′23″N 77°29′48″E

Architecture
- Type: Dravidian architecture

Swamithoppu Pathi (Tamil: சுவாமிதோப்பு பதி, Swamithoppu-pathi, Manavai-pathi, Detchana-pathi, or Thamarai-pathi) is the primary pathi of the Ayyavazhi and the sacred venue of the Tavam. Swamithope is considered primary among the Pancha pathi and the primary centre of the incarnational activities of Vaikundar.

According to the Ayyavazhi legends, Lord Vaikundar, an incarnation of Lord Narayana, carried out his tavam at Poovantanthoppe, attracting many followers across India. Upon his death, Lord Vaikundar is believed to have been interred there, with the square-shaped 'pathi' constructed to envelop him. The holy book Akilathirattu Ammanai of Ayyavazhi refers to the temple as "Thoppuppathi".

== Genesis and history ==
As per Akilam, Lord Vaikundar incarnated from the sea, and after providing rules and regulations to godheads, he came to Detchanam (Swamithoppe). He performed Tavam for six years in the Vada-va-mugam of Swamithoppe. When the Kalineesan came to arrest him, he retreated into the sea at Muttappathi. When he later returned to Swamithoppe, he was arrested. In Tamil, his incarnation, retreat, and return are collectively known as the Vinchai.

After his trial, his devotees carried him to Swamithoppe in a vahana. There, he incinerated the evil spirits and unified the Seven Virgins by himself through marriage. This ceremony took place in Ambalappathi. He returned to Swamithoppe afterward.

According to Akilathirattu Ammanai, Swamithoppe is the only place Narayana (Vaikundar) slept (in Tamil: Pallikolluthal) after the incarnation. He sent 700 families to Vakaippathi to perform Thuvayal Thavasu and organise festivals and celebrations. After all of the Avathara Ekanais, he attained Vaikundam; his physical body was interred in the Palliyarai of Swamithoppe.

== Architecture and structure ==
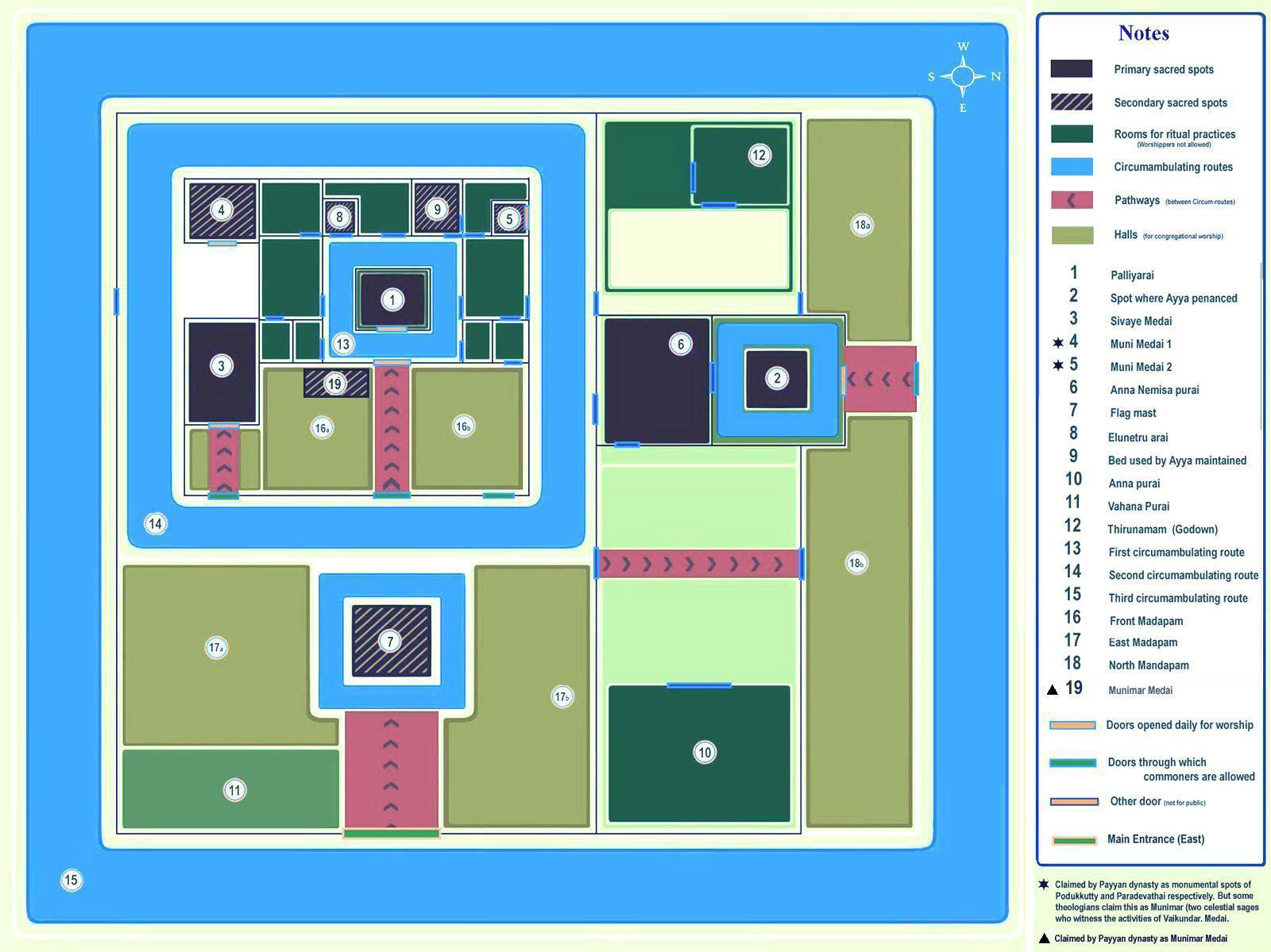
Blueprint of Swamithoppe Pathi

The Palliyarai contains two oil lamps (kuthuvilakku), an elunetru, and a large mirror. On a raised pedestal and covered with kavi cloth, the temple also preserves some articles believed to have been used by Ayya Vaikuntar. This includes a rattan cane (perampu) and a pair of wooden sandals. Inner corridors surround the Palliyarai.

There is a fifty-five-foot-tall flag mast at a distance of 50 feet from Palliyarai. North of the flag mast is an Unpanpurai. Here, they cook food and distribute it to devotees. In addition, there is Paal Kinaru in the extreme east, Vatakku Vasal in the north, and Sivaye Medai (also called Karuda Medai) in the west. The outer corridors surrounded all these. There is also a Sivalinga and an Amman Sannathi near the outer corridors. About 300 metres from the main path, there is a shared well. Akilattirattu Ammanai states that all eighteen castes take baths in that well. It was considered sacred to bathe in and drink the water from that well. There is a bell tower above the spot where Vaikundar performed the Tavam. On the door of the Swamithoppe Palliyarai is a carving of the ten avatars of Vishnu.

The main celebration of Swamithoppe includes Kodiyettru Thirunal, which is celebrated three times a year during the Tamil months of Vaikasi, Aavani, and Thai. It starts with Kodiyetrru (flag hoisting) and ends on the eleventh day with a car procession. People from different parts of Tamil Nadu and Kerala participate in this festival. Then there was Thiru Eadu Vasippu, a seventeen-day festival during which the whole contents of Akilattirattu Ammanai were read melodiously. It was celebrated during the Tamil month of Karthigai, the month in which Hari Gopalan Citar wrote it.

=== Nitham Thirunal ===
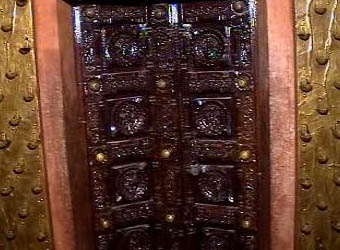
The door of Swamithoppe Palliyarai with the ten avatars of Vishnu carved on it

As per the instructions in Akilam, the Swamithope Pathi conducts a daily festival, and every day is considered a festival day. The ritual practices conducted during festival days are conducted here throughout the year, though not on a grand scale as during the other festivals. The daily Panividai starts very early in the morning. Every day, around 3a.m., the Dharmagharttas and the people staying at the temple go to Muthirikkinaru and take a holy bath. They return to the Pathi and start the panividai. The Payyan chants Ukappatippu, and the devotees repeat it. Then they open the door of the sanctum sanctorum. Witnessing this scene with the sound of a dozen temple bells and conch is considered sanctifying. Then there is the Vahana pavani.

Vahana Pavani comes around the temple and along the four-car streets, first through the Santhana Veethi and then through the Ratha Veethi. The Nithiyapal is prepared daily and offered to Ayya Vaikundar ritually. It was the only food Ayya believed to be eaten when in human form at Swamithoppe. Thavanaipal, a gruel prepared with rice and green gramme, is distributed to the devotees.

The noon Panividai starts around 11a.m. Daily Ucchipatippu is chanted. The devotees will repeat it, and Thavanaipal is distributed to the devotees. On Sundays, many people from far and near come here to participate in the Ucchipatippu.

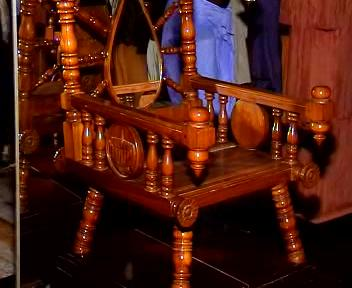
The asana at the Vada-va-mugam, the sacred venue of the Tavam

In the evening, panividai starts around 5p.m. The sanctum sanctorum door is opened amidst the sound of the temple bells and conch. Then, the Payyan would chant ukappatippu. Those followers who congregate for the evening panividai would repeat this. Then, there will be vahana panividai. The Vahana is taken around the temple and the four-car streets. After this, there will be Annadharmam.

This is the daily routine of Swamithoppe Pathi. One can worship at any time of the day in this temple.

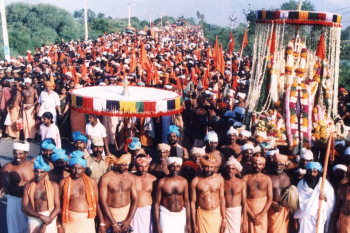
The Great Masi Procession' from Nagercoil to Swamithope.

=== Ayya Vaikunda Avataram ===
The most important festival is Ayya Vaikunda Avataram, or Vaikunda Jayanthi, the day on which Lord Vaikundar incarnated from the sea at Tiruchendur. Though many worship centres, including other Pathis, conduct celebrations during this festival, it is considered sacred to visit Swamithoppe on this day. So on this day, Swamithoppe will get populated with the nationwide Ayyavazhi followers.

This is the largest festival conducted in Swamithope Pathi. Several processions were held on the day, which started from different places, including Thiruchendur and Thiruvananthapuram, and ended at Swamithoppe.

== Location ==
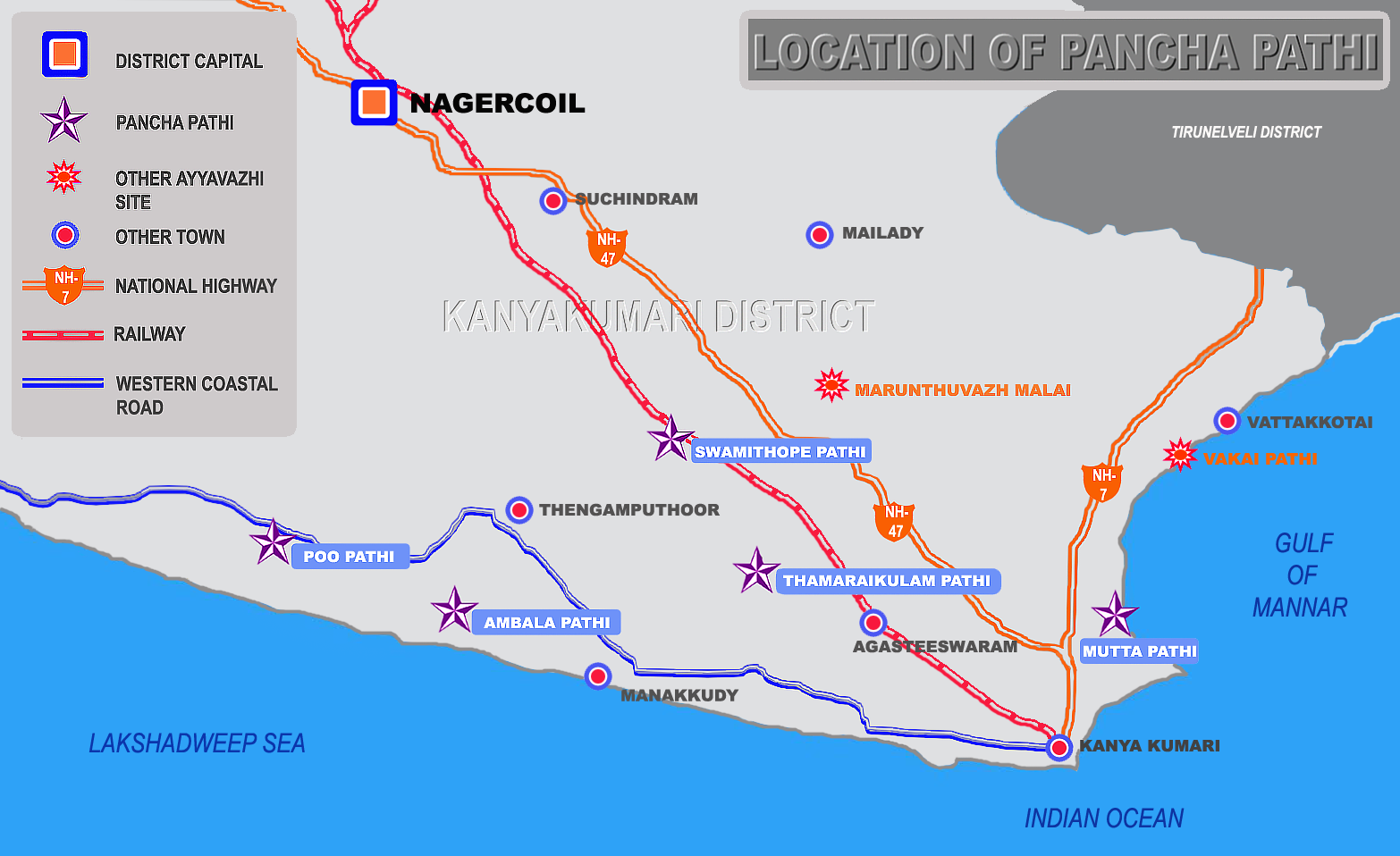
Location of Swamithope pathi and other Pathis

Swamithoppe Pathi is the primary pathi of the five pathis of Ayyavazhi and its geographical focal point. Swamithoppe Pathi is located in the town of Swamithope, which lies southeast of the city of Nagercoil. Nagercoil is the headquarters (capital) of the District of Kanyakumari in the State of Tamil Nadu, at the extreme southern tip of India. Swamithope lies about halfway between the cities of Nagercoil and Kanniyakumari on the Eathancaud-Manakkudi road.

This Pathi lies north of all other Pathis within Pancha pathi. Nagercoil (12 km) is the nearest railway station, and Thiruvananthapuram (94 km) is the nearest international airport. Town buses are available to Swamithope from Nagercoil and Kanyakumari.

== See also ==
- Ayyavazhi mythology
- Pancha pathi
- Ambala Pathi
- Poo Pathi
- Mutta Pathi
- Thamaraikulam Pathi
- Avathara Pathi
