= Thamarakkulam (disambiguation) =

Thamarakkulam may refer to,

- Thamarakulam, a business centre and neighbourhood of the city of Kollam, Kerala, India
- Thamarakkulam, a village in Alappuzha district, Kerala, India
- Kannan Thamarakkulam, Indian film director

== See also ==
- Thamaraikulam (disambiguation)
