= Lotus Pond =

A lotus pond is a pond that has lotuses.

It may also refer to:

- Lotus Pond, Hyderabad, a body of water in India
- Lotus Pond, Kaohsiung, an artificial lake in Kaohsiung on Taiwan
- Lotus Pond Park in Beijing, China
- Lotus Pond (painting), a painting by Lin Yushan
- The Lotus Pond (2011), an Indian adventure film

== See also ==
- Thamaraikulam (disambiguation)
