= Thamaraikulam, Tiruvannamalai =

Coordinates: 12.1300°N 79.0700°E

Thamarakkulam Municipality, also known as the Lotus City, is a municipality in the town of Tiruvannamalai in Tamil Nadu, India. In the 1991 census, the population of Thamaraikulam was 789, and in 2011, it was 102,678. Thamaraikulam is not under the legal jurisdiction of Tiruvannamalai. The municipal antacutu ("status") is separate from the "census town".
