= Lotus Pond (painting) =

Taiwanese painting by Lin Yu-shan

Lotus Pond is a gelatin painting by Taiwanese painter Lin Yu-shan. This painting was archived by the National Taiwan Museum of Fine Arts and is now a national treasure of the Republic of China. It is one of the most well-known modern paintings in Taiwan.

In 1930, Lin Yu-shan took the Big Lotus Pond in Niuchou Mountain in the northern suburbs of Chiayi City as the inspiration for his work and re-painted the Lotus Pond after constantly observing and sketching this scene. The painting was specially selected for the 4th Taiwan Fine Arts Exhibition the same year. Later, to obtain funding for studying in Japan, Lin Yu-shan sold Lotus Pond to Chang Chang-jung, the owner of a Western pharmacy in Chiayi.

In 1999, Ni Tsai-chin, then Director of the Museum of Art (now National Taiwan Museum of Fine Arts), intended to purchase Lotus Pond. Japanese collectors also intended to bid far more than the Museum for the painting. After raising funds through art groups and private individuals, Lotus Pond was successfully retained in Taiwan.

In 2015, Lotus Pond became the first national treasure-level piece by a Taiwanese modern painter, which laid the foundation for Lin Yu-shan’s position in Taiwan’s fine arts circle. This painting mixes the styles of Western sketching, Chinese ink painting, southern painting, Kano school of painting, etc., to describe the lotus pond landscape in the early morning dawn. The composition is divided from upper left to lower right: the egret in the center is the focus of the entire work. The upper left half depicts an unopened newly bloomed or withered lotus. The right half is the scene of a hundred flowers in full bloom. This painting realistically presents the postures and contrasts of the different stages of the lotus. It features the oriental painting style and local customs in Taiwan, with the inscription “Yushan” in the lower right corner.
