= Parasala =

Coordinates: 8°20′N 77°09′E

Parasala is a small village in Jodhpur of, Rajasthan state, India.
