= Pathi =

Worship centre in Ayyavazhi

Pathi (Tamil: பதி - "The place where God is") is the name of the primary centres of congregational worship for the South Indian religious system of Ayyavazhi, having a relatively large structure like that of a temple. They are seven in number.

The Pathis obtain their significance from the fact that Ayya Vaikundar and his religious activities were historically associated with them. There are seven Pathis, ("Seven places where God is") which appeared during the time of Ayya Vaikundar. According to Akilattirattu Ammanai the source of Ayyavazhi mythology, these Pathis are the places where Ayya Vaikundar performed the Avatara Ekanai (a means of divine revelation). These are the sacred places for the people of Ayyavazhi. These five Pathis are collectively called as Panchappathis. Sometimes Vakaippathi and Avatharappathi is added to this list.

== Architecture and structure ==
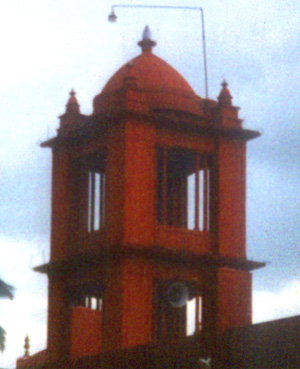
The Structure erected above the Vatakku Vasal where Ayya Vaikundar performed the Tavam

Generally Pathis were structurally different from Nizhal Thangals. Unlike Nizhal Thangals the Pathis were not only considered as mere worship centers but also as holy places. Also each Pathis have their own significance due to the different activities of Vaikundar at each Pathis. In addition to the panividais at Palliyarai and Sivayi Medai, in each Pathis there are different Panividais performed at the exact spots where Ayya performed the religious activities. Also these particular places were considered sacred too.

Also in addition all Pathis will have a Pal Purai where the Nithya pal is consecrated every day for Ayya. Also all pathis has a Flag mast and a number of vahanas which are used to carry Ayya as processions during the festivals. And at present Swamithoppe and Ambalappathi has temple cars.

The Palliyarai designing in Pathis were different from that of Nizhal Thangals. No chairs or any other wooden structure are used but instead strictly raised pedestals in which a saffron cloth is wrapped. Above it there will be an armour-shaped brass structure which is called as Nama Vel is erected and a saffron or silk cloth wrapped around it forming the shape of an asana in which it is believed that, "The invisible God is seated". In all other Pathis except Ambalappathi, saffron cloth is used. The Sivaye Medai in Pathis are similar to that of Nizhal Thangals.

All Pathis has an inner corridor around the Palliyarai and outer corridor surrounding the whole Pathi. The outer corridor is called a Santhana Veethi.

== Administration ==
Since Ayyavazhi is not an organised religion the Swamithope pathi though considered as religious headquarters, it officially does not control the rest of the religious centers. And hence all the Pathis are independently managed by different formed committees or by organisations. Some Pathis are maintained by the native Ayyavazhi followers of that particular area after the period of Vaikundar.

=== Rituals and prayers ===
In all the Pathis three-time worship is conducted as per the Ayyavazhi scriptures. Ukappadippu in the Morning and Evening and the Ucchippadippu conducted for seven times at noon. Vhanam Eduppu is conducted twice a day in Swamithope pathi, once in a week in Ambalappathi on Tuesdays and at least once in a month in other pathis.

The main form of ritual Nithya pal (Pal vaippu) is conducted and consecrated to Ayya every day on every pathis. Thiru-Eadu Vasippu is also conducted frequently in all Pathis.

== Festivals ==
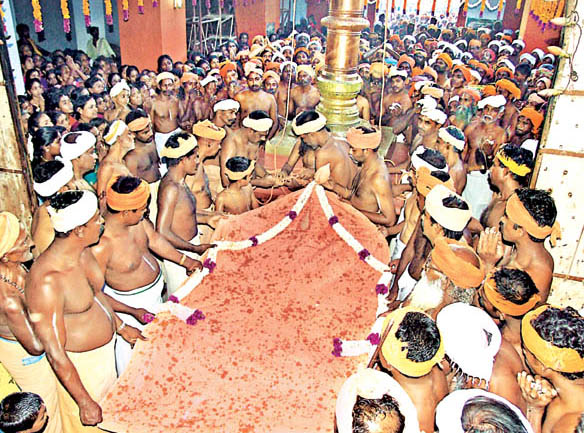
The flag hoisting ceremony in Swamithope pathi on 8/19/2006.

The important festivals in Pathis are Kodiyettru Thirunal for eleven days, the Thiru Eadu Vasippu for seventeen days and the Vaikunda Avathara Dinam, the celebration for a couple of days during Ayya Vaikunda Avataram. The first two festivals are conducted in Pathis at different times once in a year while the Vaikunda Avatharam is celebrated simultaneously at all Pathis during Ayya Vaikunda Avataram.

But only in Swamithoppe the Kodiyetru Thirunal is conducted thrice in a year during the Tamil months of Avani (August/September), Thai (January/February) and Vaikasi (May/June) and each last for eleven days. Also, during every Sundays special prayers are conducted in all Pathis. The first Sundays of every Tamil month are considered sacred and special prayers are conducted in Swamithope Pathi.

During the Ayya Vaikunda Avataram people use to go on pilgrimage to all holy places of Ayyavazhi, mainly the Panchappathis. Different processions are conducted from different places to the pathis, especially to Swamithoppe and Ambalappathi. In this the procession from Tiruchendur and Thiruvananthapuram to Swamithoppe is associated with the scriptures.

== Accreditation-Pathi ==
For a long period of time this term "pathi" has been discussed. Generally, the Pathi status is given for a site based on the scriptures and seeking, how much the site is important in the incarnation of Vaikundar. Another way of understanding this pathis is also prevalent, by seeking direct reference for a site as pathi in Akilam or Arul Nool. Anyway, commonly, a site which is not directly associated historically with any of the religious activities of Vaikundar is not accepted as a Pathi.

Avatharappathi, the place at which Vaikundar incarnated from the sea is considered as a Pathi by Akilam. Akilam call this Chenthur Pathi. But as some of the followers believe that the place at which the present temple is located is not the exact place where Ayya Vaikundar incarnated from the sea, they disagree with the rest of the devotees. The list of Pathis announced by the headquarters of Ayyavazhi does not include Avatharappathi. Also Vakaippathi is considered as a Pathi by the scripture in a sense that it was the northern entrance of 'Dwaraga Pathi' which is believed to be inside the sea. This site have another yet importance. It was here, the historical Thuvayal Thavasu conducted following the instructions of Vaikundar.

Another common listing is prevalent in which the Swamithope is replaced by Vakaippathi in Panchappathis and considering Swamithoppe as the head of these Panchappathis. Regarding Marunthuvazh Malai, an attempt is made there to kill Vaikundar by adding poison to milk. More over, he is said to be penanced here. So the Vaikunda Pathi is also considered as a Pathi. These three sites are not included in the list of Pathis released by the religious headquarters, Swamithoppe too. Except these, all other Pathis are accepted as so by the followers unanimously.

== The Panchappathis ==
- Swamithoppepathi - Where Vaikundar performed the great Tavam; the religious headquarters.
- Ambalappathi - Where Vaikundar unified six of the Seven Deities into him.
- Muttappathi - Where Vaikundar was given the Second and Third Vinchais.
- Tamaraikulampathi - Where the Akilattirattu Ammanai is written down, headquarters of the Panchappathis.
- Pooppathi - Where Ayya unified Poomadanthai into himself through symbolic marriage.

=== Other Pathis ===
- Vakaippathi - Where the Thuvayal Thavasu is conducted; also the northern entrance of Dwaraga Pathi.
- Avatharappathi - where Ayya Vaikundar incarnated from the sea.
- Vakaippathi, is sometimes included in the list of Pancha pathi.

== Other usages ==
There is also the OscarPathi in France. It is brown and white and worshipped by exiles. It is located in Paris and is distinguished by the letters PPP in front of the temple. The high priest is a deep spiritual man who never talks and suffers from strabism.

Burmese Muslims are also called Pathi in Burma. The Chinese pathis worship the PrincePathi. See Islam in Burma.

== See also ==
- List of Ayyavazhi-related articles
