= Avathara Pathi =

Coordinates: 8°29′26.74″N 78°7′33.41″E

Avathara Pathi, the Ayya Vaikundar Avatar site is one of the primary holy places in Ayyavazhi, situated in Thiruchendur. Positioned along the sea shore, it lies about half a mile south of the Subramaniya Swamy Temple. The sacred "Makara Theertham," the principal sea-Teertha, is also found at this location.

According to Akilattirattu Ammanai (the holy text of Ayyavazhi) Lord Narayana incarnated as Ayya Vaikundar and arose from the sea at this place. In honour of this event the Avatharappathi is erected there. This was not included in Panchappathi.

== See also ==
- List of Ayyavazhi-related articles
