= Panguni =

- Native name: Panguni
- Calendar: Tamil calendar
- Month number: 12
- Number of days: 30 or 31
- Season: Pin-pani (pre-vernal)
- Gregorian equivalent: March–April
- Significant days: Panguni Uthiram; Rama Navami

Panguni is the twelfth and last month of the Tamil calendar. The name of the month is derived from the position of the Moon near the Uttiram nakshatra (star) on the pournami (full moon) day. The month corresponds to pin-pani kalam (pre-vernal season) and falls in March–April in the Gregorian calendar.

In the Hindu lunar calendar, it corresponds to the twelfth month of Phalguna, falling in the Gregorian months of December–January.

In the Hindu solar calendar, it corresponds to the last month of Mina and begins with the Sun's entry into Pisces.

In the Vaishnava calendar, it corresponds to the twelfth month of Govinda.

== Festivals ==
Panguni Uthiram is a Tamil festival that falls on the day the nakshatra (star) of Uttiram aligns with full moon day (pournami) in the month of Panguni. The day commemorates the weddings of the Hindu deities Shiva and Parvati, Murugan and Deivanai, and Vishnu and Lakshmi. It also marks the day of manifestation of Ayyappan. On this day, special rituals, processions, and wedding ceremonies of deities are conducted across Hindu temples.

Rama Navami, which commemorates the birth of the Hindu god Rama, is celebrated on the navami (ninth lunar day) tithi of the Shukla Paksha (waning moon) of the month.

== See also ==
- Astronomical basis of the Hindu calendar
- Hindu astronomy
