= Ayyavazhi rituals =

Religious practices prevalent among the followers of Ayyavazhi

Ayyavazhi rituals are the religious practices prevalent among the followers of Ayyavazhi. Most of them are connected with Akilam and Arul Nool and a few, though not associated with the holy books, are practiced for over a century right from the beginning of Ayyavazhi. Some practices are unique for Pathis and some others are common for all worship centres.

Forms of worship and the features attendant on them can be said to be manifestations and indicators of the type of religiosity present in a religious universe. Apart from Basement of Philosophy and Theology, the various religious practices of Ayyavazhi are also the pillars on which it stands to prove its uniqueness.

From the sociological point of view, it also strengthens both physically and mentally the socially downtrodden in a religious way. Several practices evolved in the Ayyavazhi tradition. Religious experience that was existent in Ayyavazhi seems to have expressed itself through certain forms with specific features as said in Akilattirattu Ammanai.

== Vegetarianism ==
The practice of vegetarianism is one of the important facts among the followers of Ayyavazhi, seeming to have originated along with Thuvayal Thavasu. Some followers adopted partial vegetarianism. Today, vegetarianism is being strictly practised in one form or another by a section of the followers of Ayyavazhi as one of their religious observances. In particular, most of the Panividaiyalars (one who performs Panividai) of Pathis and Nizhal Thangals strictly follow Vegetarianism.

The vegetarianism is also activated and highly motivated by the narration of myth in Akilam. Five of the most serious non-vegetarian devils are converted into pure and vegetarian god-heads as Sivayis or Garuda for serving Vaikundar throughout the incarnation. Arul Nool too teaches one should be vegetarian to a high degree, or otherwise at least partially, especially during the reading of scriptures and during festivals and when practising rituals.

Also the Thuvayal Thavasu teaches one not only to be vegetarian, but also how to diet or control food-intake.

== Muthirikkinaru and Muthiri patham ==
Akilattirattu mentions a well, situated near the place where Ayya Vaikundar undertook the tavam, and the prevalence of certain ritual practices around it. The well, situated at present at a distance of a furlong to the west of the main pathi (temple) at Swamithoppe, is the historical well.

Akilattirattu speaks of "the eighteen castes assembling in one place, and bathing from the same well". This refers to the prevalence of a seemingly innocuous practice of the people, gathered around Ayya Vaikundar, bathing together from the water of this well. People of different castes bathe together at this well, mindless of their social differences.

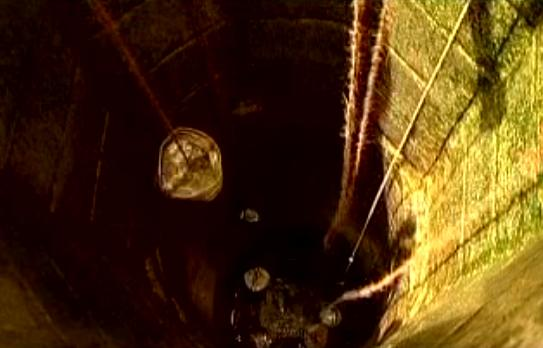
Inner view of the Octagonal Muthiri Kinaru in Swamithope

Physical closeness was necessitated mainly because of the smallness of the well. Besides bathing, they drank this water as a cure for their illnesses. They cooked their food with this water, and ate the food in a community feast. In the course of events, the well and its water seem to have acquired religious significance to the people of Ayyavazhi. The acts of bathing, drinking a few drops of it, and cooking the food with this water came to be repeated with a ritual fervour. People consider the well a sacred one, and the water as having miraculous powers to heal sicknesses, thousands of people having benefited. A couplet from the Sattu Nittu Olai of Arul Nool reads: "everyone is drinking the milk of the well around which miracles are growing". People considered it a religious obligation to bathe and drink at least a few drops of water from this well.

Currently, one of the important ritual actions performed by the devotees of Ayyavazhi is to take this ritual bath, drawing water from a well dug near every pathi. This has become a necessary ritual before one worships at the pathis. Devotees throng the well to get a few buckets of water onto them and drink a few drops ceremoniously a total of five times before proceeding to the pathi. This practice of bathing at the well is being addressed as patamitutal or muttiripatam.

== Thirunamam ==
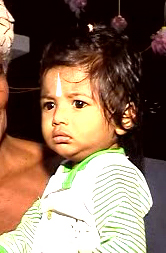
A Child with Thirunamam smeared in the forehead.

Thiru (word representing sacredness) + Namam (name) represents (The Sacred name). The people of Ayyavazhi wear a vertical white mark on the forehead in the shape of a flame, starting from the central point between the eyebrows, going straight up near the top edge of the forehead.

The flame shape represents Aanma Jyothi or Atman meaning Atman is considered sacred and is the name of God. Zealous devotees smear it on the exterior of the upper arms and over the chest. This white mark was unlike the one worn by a Hindu of Vaishnavism tradition who wore it on the forehead in the shape of a 'U', or of Saivism tradition where it is worn horizontally in three parallel lines. The white powder used for this mark was made from coarse white soil.

Ayya Vaikundar seems to have personally touched the forehead of followers and worn it for them. On account of this action, it came to be called thottunamam – meaning 'a mark with a personal touch'. A verse in Ukappatippu of Arulnool says: "Our Ayya is coming to us by wearing a thottunamam". This dimension of personal touch stood out to the public eye and was much appreciated by the people of Ayyavazhi.

At present, those who 'serve' in every Pathi or Nizhal Thangals, wear this white mark for the people and offer a portion of it in their hands. People carry it home as a holy object, and some of them even swallow a little of it believing it to be medicinal.

== Wearing of headgear during worship ==
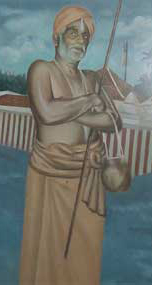
A Painting of the mid twentieth century which shows one of the (then) administrators of Swamithoppe Pathi wearing headgear

One of the significant ritual actions that distinguished the Ayyavazhi male worshipper from others was 'wearing a headgear' during worship. Ayya Vaikundar seems to have enjoined upon his male followers to tie a headgear when they came to worship God. Accordingly, the male followers seem to have tied a headgear during worship. This is to reveal that every person is a king and every one in to rule the Earth. This philosophy is told symbolically by the practice of wearing the headgear since the wearing of headgear is considered as a matter of pride. It was said that this is one of the practices which ties Ayyavazhi close to the Advaita tradition. In addition to the uniqueness of this practice, writings of the historians point to the emergence of this practice as unique to Ayyavazhi.

It became a ritual action to be performed before the people entered the Pathi to worship. The male devotees usually removed their upper garment and tied the headgear and entered the Pathi for worship. To this day this practice is followed.

== Healing diseases ==
Akilam says that Ayya Vaikundar also cured illness in some people with the power he had as the avatar of Narayana. The LMS Report for the year 1843 mentions that Vaikuntacami, "asserts that one of the principle Hindoo deities has taken up his abode within him," and that because of this, "he is enabled to perform the cure of all diseases, and to confer innumerable blessings on his followers." People believing him to be an avatar who could perform cures, seem to have flocked to him and to have been cured by him. In reality, Ayya Vaikundar seems to have initiated a practice of treating the diseases with water and earth. His devotees realised that Ayya was doing these things as a realisation of the dharma that he came to proclaim.

Even today there are a few faithful devotees in Ayyavazhi in their absolute faith in Vaikundar, who do not take any medicine and instead take soil (Thirunamam) and water (Patham) from Pathis and Nizhal Thangals, wearing the Thirunamam on their forehead and drinking the Patham ceremoniously.

== Panividai ==
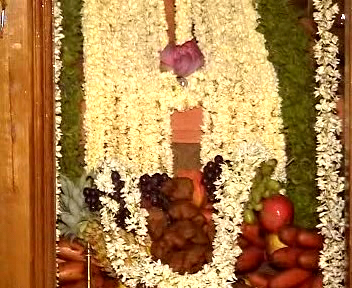
The Panividai performed in front of the asana in Palliyarai

Panividai means service. It originally seems to have denoted the service rendered by the disciples to Ayya Vaikundar while he performed the tavam and other activities. It included the activities of serving him with a meal, instructing the people on his behalf, and carrying him to different places wherever he wished to go.

After the earthly life of Ayya Vaikundar, panividai had come to mean the service rendered at the sanctuary of Pathis and Nizhal Tangals where Ayya Vaikundar is believed to reside. This service includes cleaning the floor of the sanctuary with water, cleansing and lighting the lamp, offering Churul (betel leaf, arecanut, and bananas), conducting or leading the prayers of incantation like Ucchippatippu or Ukappatippu, wearing Thirunamam and serving food to the devotees. Those who do this service are called panividaiyalar (one who performs panividai). This service may be considered as the counterpart of the puja offered in the temples of Hinduism.

== Patippu, Pattu, Pothippu (The prayers) ==
In the religious gatherings of Ayyavazhi, even as certain forms of worship were in their rudimentary form, one could find the practice of singing songs together which, later on, seems to have been recognised as 'prayer formulas', and recited ritually.

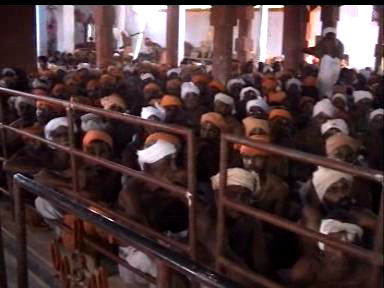
Worshippers during morning prayer in Swamithope pathi

Among these prayer formulas, Ukappattu, known also as Ukappatippu, which have been formulated during the Thuvayal Thavasu, seems to have occupied a prominent place during the worship. It was recited by a leader and was repeated after him by the people in unison. This prayer formula, for its main part, dwells on the themes of Ayya Vaikundar's divine attributes, his mission to destroy the kali, to establish the Dharma Yukam, and to rule the earth as the undisputed king. Currently, a short form of this prayer is recited every morning and evening at the worship centres of Ayyavazhi or at homes, and the full version of it during special occasions

Other prayer formulas of Uccippatippu – a form of incantationary prayer that speaks about the special attributes of God, recited currently during the noon-worship, Vazhappatippu – are a form of adulatory repetitive prayer that has statements of wishes for the prosperity of the people of Santror Makkal and seem to have developed during the course of the early development of Ayyavazhi. Pothippu, another short formulaic prayer, the content of which invokes God for forgiveness, protection, means of livelihood, attitudes of tolerance and amiability towards one another, and, intelligence, seems to have evolved over the years. It is now recited at the start of every collective worship session. The followers of Ayyavazhi are enjoined to recite this prayer at the break of each day.

== Offering of Churul ==
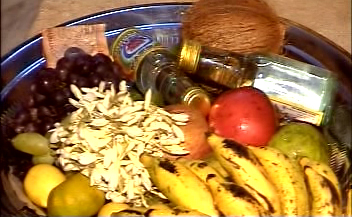
The churul kept prepared to offer for Panividai

Ayyavazhi does not have the idea of 'giving offerings' but only 'giving Churul’ This is also one of the significant practices of Ayyavazhi. The gift offered to Ayya Vaikundar was called ‘Churul’, a word that denoted the gift exchanged between consanguineous relatives during marriage functions by way of introducing the kith and kin to the affines. Whoever brought a gift to Ayya Vaikundar gave it to him as if giving to his / her Ayya (father), a curul. It is said in Akilattirattu that towards the end of his mission, Ayya Vaikundar was invited to the houses of his followers and was treated with this Churul.

At present this act of giving Churul has been ritualised and it is also known as nemital. People bring bananas, coconuts and flowers, in a box made of palm leaves, and hand it over to the one performing Panivitai. The panivitaiyalar receives it and offers it to Ayya and then, after retaining a major portion of it for sharing with others, returns the box with a small portion as Inimam – a gift from Ayya to his children.

== Worship in front of a mirror ==
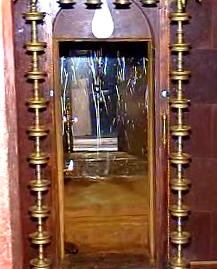
One of the rare photographs of Swamithope Palliyarai, where the inner mounted mirror is clearly visible.

This is yet another unique practice that distinguishes Ayyavazhi from other Hindu religious traditions. The Nizhal Thangals and Pathis have, in their sanctuary, a mirror to reflect the images of those who come to worship. People pay obeisance to their God standing in front of this mirror, facing the Elunetru amidst two oil lamps. Even in the houses of the people of Ayyavazhi, the place earmarked for their daily worship has at least a mirror and a lamp. This is to show the worshippers who go in front of the mirror that, 'God is inside him or herself'.

Regarding the time of origin of this practice, as soon as Ayya attained Vaikundam – a religious euphemism to indicate pass over – people, as per his earlier instruction, installed the mirror over his tomb and began worshipping.

The Ayyavazhi worship focuses on and revolves around the constant, formless, supreme self which exists inside and as all elements. But this formless self is visible or accessible in one or more different forms or ways with respect to the subjects (viewers); this was symbolised by using the mirror in the Palliyarai, that the image seen in a mirror is nothing but which varies according to the visible object. On the other hand, this mirror installation symbolises the advaidic term that 'God is you' , (i.e.) The mirror is kept facing the worshipper in Palliyarai, and one who sees the sanctum sanctorum only sees himself there.

== Congregational worship ==
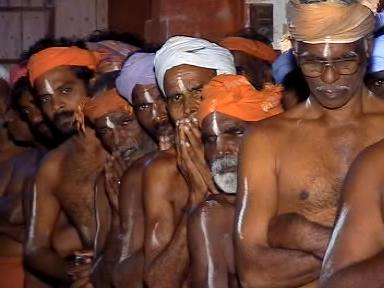
Worshippers in mass prayer in Swamithope pathi

Congregational worship was a distinctive feature of Ayyavazhi worship. Praying together or 'mass prayer' was a form of worship Ayya Vaikundar formulated, in distinction to the practice of priests performing Poojas for individual or collective audiences.

Currently, congregational worship takes place at appointed hours in the worship centres of Ayyavazhi. The devotees worship God, standing close to each other, hands folded over their chests, and a turban (Thalai pahai) on the heads of the males. They recite together the Ucchippatippu and Ukappatippu, the central prayers. Apart from these, the devotees that come to worship in the Pathi perform certain other rituals also.

== Anna Dharmam (Charity on food) ==
Inter-dining was an important activity that originated in the gatherings of AV. It has been already noted that people of different castes, coming from far and wide, brought with them food materials for cooking their meals when they came to meet Ayya Vaikundar. They cooked and ate in the presence of Ayya Vaikundar. This commonplace action evolved into a significant practice of inter-dining between persons of different groups, cutting across the boundaries of caste restrictions. This practice, being performed in a religious setting with a certain measure of earnestness and respect, seems to have acquired the character of a ritual too.

The practice of Anna Dharmam (charity on food) too seems to have emerged in association with inter-dining. With a ritual significance, food was distributed to the needy and to all those gathered around Ayya Vaikundar.

Today, the food being served as Anna Dharmam is known as Unpan Annam, literally meaning 'the food to be eaten', and, it has its own specific method of preparation. Rice, vegetables, and spices are cooked and mixed together for the purpose. Then it is served ceremoniously. When it is served, the partakers wait till everyone is served. Then a question is posed customarily by the partakers: "Ayya annam kutikkalama ?" (Ayya, may we eat the meal?) and when it is answered by those who serve as "Ayya annam kutiyunkal" (You may kindly eat the meal), the partakers eat the meal. This was to ensure that everyone got the meal. The poor and the rich – all partake of this meal without discrimination. It was considered as a religious virtue to partake of this meal. There is another variant of Anna Dharmam known as Palvaippu, serving of gruel-like food boiled in milk. Currently, every centre of worship of Ayyavazhi has this practice once a month. Anna Dharmam in one form or the other is a daily feature in most of the worship centres of Ayyavazhi.

== A distinct language ==
ALTERNATIVE USAGES IN AYYAVAZHI
TERMS	IN HINDUISM	IN AYYAVAZHI
Temple	Kovil or Alayam	Pathi or Thangal
Holy Water	Thirtham	Patham
Devotee	Bhaktan	Anbarkal
Gift to the devotee	Prasada	Inimam
Ritual sacrifice	Pooja	Panividai
Offering to God	Archanai	Curul
Ritual Oblation	Chattuthal	Nemithal
Ceremonial Car	Chappiram	Vahanam

The language used in prayers, incantations, and rituals has been Tamil in its simple form. Akilam, while expounding on the glorious features of Dharma Yukam, projects Tamil to be its reigning language. Use of Tamil for worship was striking against the background of the prevalence of the use of Sanskrit in Hindu worship commonly in not only Travancore but in the whole of the Hindu universe during the advent of Ayyavazhi.

It is noteworthy that some words being used in the Ayyavazhi tradition are strikingly different from those in the Sanskritic tradition. While the words used in the Sanskritic form of worship (in Hinduism) seem to maintain a distance between God and the human being, the Tamil words used in Ayyavazhi forecast a close relation or tie with God and worshippers. This set of words seems to give a distinct identity to Ayyavazhi.

The Pothippu, in which the worshippers apologise to God for their sin and beg for pardon and redemption is a prayer form written in spoken-Tamil and is a good example of the usage of common language understood by ordinary people.

== Shamanism ==
Shamanism is still in practice in some worship centres. Some believe that through the words of these possessed persons one could be able to know what God tells about him or herself or their activities. As part of shamanic practice, they exhorted the people on various matters, practiced divination (Kanakku) to discern the causes of sickness and misfortunes, and 'foretold future happenings'. The Akilattirattu Ammanai seems to have recognized shamanic acts of worship. A quote in Arul Nool reads, "For imparting knowledge and making things clear, I kept those who practice divination in the temples." Though shamanism was practised in Ayyavazhi, it was accepted by the scriptures only as an ignorant way of worship (beginning stage in worship) or the initial way to teach a beginner the metaphysics. But on the other hand, shamanic actions in the worship centers of Ayyavazhi are quite often criticised. Commonly it was believed that in 'Ayyavazhi possessions', the possessed person being in the Padmasana posture simply utters or speaks to the audience instead of standing and dancing, as now is the practice. This act of 'standing and dancing' is criticised seriously almost universally by Ayyavazhi followers.

Also, Akilam tells of a false deity which was sent to the world by Narayana after Vaikundar attained Vaikundam. It also states that this false deity used to say, "I am Vaikundar, I was the one who married the deities and unified into myself." Also this false deity shows many magic practices and also many miracles. Some people used to compare shamanic actions to that of false deity. They cite several quotes from Ayyavazhi scriptures for their criticism. But with a different point of view the supporters of shamanism give different synonymous outputs for the quotes and strengthen their stands.

There is also a belief that Mudisoodum Perumal is a shaman, within whom Vaikundar was a divine power. Though this was commonly not accepted, some theologians refer to some quotes in Akilam and Arul Nool to support their claim.

== See also ==
- List of Ayyavazhi-related articles
- Worship centers of Ayyavazhi
- Ayyavazhi theology

Discover ayya vaikundar temples across the world
