= Kodiyettru Thirunal =

The decorated Flagmast pedestal after the flag hoisting ceremony in Swamithoppe.

Kodiyettru Thirunal is the festival celebrated in Swamithoppepathi for eleven days by the followers of the Ayyavazhi. This is celebrated three times annually during the Tamil months of Aavani, Thai and Vaikaasi. The festival for the month of Vaikasi is considered the most sacred and is celebrated in a grand scale.

The festival starts on the first Friday of Avani and Thai. In Vaikasi, the festival begins on the second Friday of the month. The festival starts with the hoisting of the Saffron coloured holy Flag, early in the morning. In the evening the elunetru is carried around the Pathi and through the four car streets in Vahanas.

== Vahanas ==
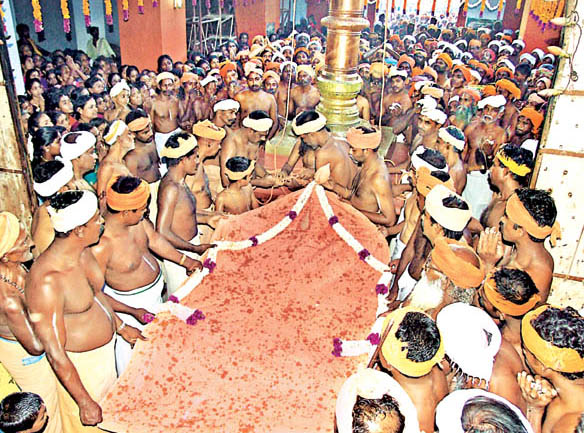
The flag hoisting fest during Kodiyettru Thirunal in Swamithope pathi.

- Day one - Thottil Vahana
- Day two - Chair Vahana
- Day three - Swan Vahana
- Day four - Chapira Vahana
- Day five - Chapira Vahana
- Day six - Naga Vahana
- Day seven - Garuda Vahana
- Day eight - Horse Vahana
- Day nine - Hanuman Vahana
- Day ten - Indra Vahana
- Day eleven - Temple Car

== See also ==
- Swamithope pathi
- Pathi
