= Payyan dynasty =

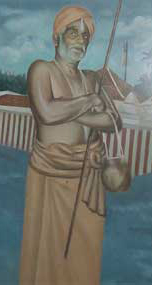
A Painting of the mid-20th century which shows Dharmaghartta (One among Payyans), Payyan Chella Vadivu.

Payyan dynasty is the family which manage and administer Swamithope pathi, the temple of Ayyavazhi.

== Payyan in Arul Nool ==
A quote in Arul Nool refers 'Payyan' in Pathiram.
