= Thuvayal Thavasu =

Thuvayal Thavasu, literally washing penance, was a significant religious event that took place in the 19th century. It was also called as thuvayal panthi. (panthi means an arrangement of people in a row for meals during feasts). By the late 1830s, when the Hindu religion Ayyavazhi had come to exist with certain excitement and euphoria, a group of people, of different age groups and genders, undertook to perform this unique exercise as directed by Lord Vaikundar.

Participants of this exercise seem to have sold out their properties in a manner of renunciation, at half of their value. And, with a bare minimum of means of livelihood, they had gone to a place near the eastern seashore, know presently as Vakaippathi, situated at about four kilometers to the north of Cape Comorin. They camped there together and performed the following actions in a manner of a ritual: They took a bath and washed their clothes in the seawater thrice every day and cooked vegetarian meal with raw rice and green-grams, and ate it only once a day. The manner of eating was that they took it directly with their mouth from the sandy ground where the food had been laid. They drank only the salty water and abstained from fish. Apart from washing, cooking and eating, the remaining hours were spent on spiritual exercises. They recited certain incantations taught by persons among them who had the gift of oracles. These persons instructed the group whatever they had to do. It was one of these persons that taught the group the popular incantation called Ukappatippu literally meaning ‘song of the aeon’, the recital of which, often an abridged version of it, forms part of the daily rituals of Ayyavazhi to this day.

There seems to have been some opposition to the practice of this exercise of thuvayal thavasu. There is a verse in Akilathirattu that says, the wicked violently dispersed those that participated in this thuvayal thavasu. The high caste people caused trouble and tried to disperse the participants. But the participants seem to have withstood and continued the exercise.

As per the account of Akilathirattu, the people performed this exercise for about six months. As the days passed, stinkbugs, ticks, swarming flies and other pests caused skin diseases and serious disturbances of them. People took them as test caused by Ayya Vaikundar of their faith, courage and fortitude, and withstood all the tribulations. Finally, being instructed through a person's dream, they ended the thavasu at Vakaippathi, and, went over to a place now known as Muttappathi, situated at a distance of three kilometers to the south of Vakaippathi. At Muttappathi, they spent a month in similar exercises, and stopped it only when struck by severe diseases that killed a few of them, which they read as definite sign to end the thavasu.

After ending the thavasu, the participants returned to their native places. They were received with respect and reverence, and, addressed honourably as Thuvayal pantarams They went to different places, and spread whatever they had learned from the thavasu. They were received cordially by the followers of Ayyavazhi who considered it a religious virtue to be hospitable to them. The now prevalent practice of offering food (called as thavanakanci) in Nizhal Thangals seems to have originated from this act of charity. The participants external appearance seems to have undergone a change after this exercise. Akilathirattu says that the surrounding people who witnessed them exclaimed as follows: "The dress of the Namputiri and other Brahmins have lost their shine, whereas that of the Chanar shine like the sun... See what a change has come about for Chanars. The people who awaited avidly the arrival of fish and ate it even half cooked in a greedy manner, and chewed tobacco incessantly, have transformed themselves so much!"

The LMS Report for the year 1892 puts it as: "It is true that their [the devoteed of Vikunda Swamy] bodies and their houses are more cleanly [sic] than those of the rest."
