= Vinchai to Vaikundar =

In the literature of Hinduism, Vinchai are proclamations and instructions to the newly born child Vaikundar, by his father Lord Narayana, also known as Vishnu, one of the three godheads in Akilathirattu Ammanai, the source of Ayyavazhi mythology. Three such Vichais took place during the period of Vaikundar; the first in Thiruchendur, immediately after his incarnation; the venue second and third Vinchais are in Muttapathi (sea), one by one between his incarnational activities.

== The proclamation and instructions (Vinchai) ==
The proclamations were as follows:

- I, the Narayana Pantaram, born in the sea, in the year 1008 Masi, has taken my abode in Detchanam (south).
- I, Narayanan, do not want offerings, bribes, and kavati and I want to do away with these activities henceforth.
- As I am born as the Vaikundar, the Dharma Yukam is unfolding. All those worthy of this Dharma Yukam only will survive the annihilation of kali Yukam.
- Undertake a rigorous tavam for six years in order that the Dharma Yukam may dawn upon the world. Your tavam will excel all tavam performed hitherto. Let the demons know the effect of your tavam.(See: Tavam of Vaikundar)
- Do not accept any blood sacrifice as done by the bloodthirsty demons.
- Those struck by the Kali will despise you, and try to disrupt your tavam. Persevere in your endeavour. Forbearance and fortitude will make you great.
- Be sure, we, the three god-heads are in you. You yourself are Sivan, vethan and Thirumal.
- Once you complete the tavam, your wish will materialise. I will give you the reigns of the world, and you will rule it under one banner. You will rule all the castes as equals .

Mayon then gave the following exhortations to his child, Vaikundar, in order to perform an effective tavam:

- Do not be deceived by the love of deceitful people
- Rest assured that Dharmam alone is the greatest virtue
- Uplifting the lowly is Dharmam, be not intemperate
- Do not hate anyone even if they are evil-mongers
- Be thoughtful in your conversation
- Forbearance and fortitude only will make you great
- Do charity to all
- Live with dignity and self-respect
- Cast away all the demons and the eighteen castes into the sea, fire and to the mountains
- Announce that there are no more taxes to be paid .

== See also ==
- Ayyavazhi mythology
- List of Ayyavazhi-related articles
