= Tavam of Vaikundar =

According to Akilathirattu Ammanai, for ten months, Lord Vaikundar revealed to the people all about the past, present, and future in the form of songs. He sang definitively about the future. Some of those who heard him, took his words as meaningless mutterings. Vaikundar, realizing that forbearance and fortitude were the essential virtues needed in his project of transforming the world, becalmed himself and performed the Tavam (Meditation). Having justice in his breath, the thought of mercy in his mind, and renouncing the desires of the body and containing the tendencies of his ego, Vaikundar performed the Tavam concentrating totally on the commands he had received from his father. His appearance was squalid, with holy ashes smeared on him, and the long unkempt hair flowing in the air.

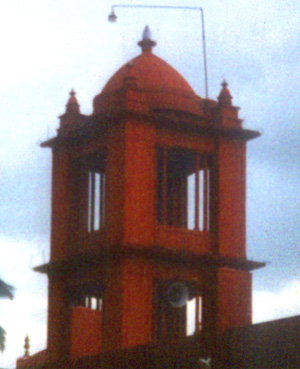
The Structure erected above the Vatakku Vasal where Lord Vaikundar performed the Tavam

This tavam was so effective that it surpassed the Tavam undertaken even by Isvaran previously. He undertook to perform a six-year tavam, divided into three phases, for three different causes.

- First phase for the dawn of Dharma Yukam
- Second phase the abolition of caste discrimination
- Third phase for the well-being of his predecessors and for the Seven Virgins

Within these six years, a great multitude of people - old and young, men and women- came to him from all directions. They all gathered there as one humanity, as children of a single parentage without any discrimination on the basis of might or caste. Vaikundar cured the sick, blessed those without progeny to have with offspring, made the dumb speak, the blind see, and rooted out the curses that had been engulfing the people. Whoever came and experienced him exclaimed that God Almighty had come among the people. Seeing the multitude of people coming together as children of one family, and, drinking from the same well and dining in one place, the learned persons surmised that what had been said in the Agama's - was coming true.

== See also ==
- Ayyavazhi mythology
- List of Ayyavazhi-related articles
- Ayya Vaikundar
- Swamithope pathi
