= Swamithope =

- Village
- Location in Tamil Nadu, India
- Coordinates: 8.12°N 77.49°E
- Country: India
- State: Tamil Nadu
- District: Kanyakumari
- Elevation: 13 m (43 ft)

Languages
  - Official: Tamil
- Time zone: UTC+5:30 (IST)
- PIN: 629 xxx
- Telephone code: 91-4652
- Vehicle registration: TN-74

Swamithope (alternate spelling Swamithoppe) is the name of a village that lies southeast of the City of Nagercoil, the capital of the District of Kanyakumari in the State of Tamil Nadu, at the extreme southern tip of India. In the past, Swamithope was known by the name Poovandanthoppe which was part of the village, Sasthankutty Vilai Swamithope lies about half-way between the cities of Nagercoil and Kanniyakumari on the Nagercoil-Kanniyakumari road. Swamithope is located at 8.12°N 77.49°E

Swamithoppu is a synonym for this village, as used in the holy book (Akilam) of the Tamil belief system Ayyavazhi. Swamithoppu is the name earned by the village Swami (Ayya Vaikundars thavam) Thoppu was a coconut tree farm so it has been merged by people. being the origin of the Ayyavazhi religion in the mid-nineteenth century. It is the birthplace place of sampoorana Devan, after the incarnation at his age of 24 he got 4 ubadesa vinjai from Lord Narayana in the Thiruchendoor sea, after 3 days of Birth and vinjai ubadesam Sampoorana Devans Body has been used by Lord Narayana to become Ayya Vaikundar the founder of the practice called Ayyavazhi. Ayya vazhi means fathers' way of practice and presently serves as the site of its Head of Ayya vaikundars teaching practice to reach the God. (the Swamithope Pathi). It also becomes the terminating point of beautiful western ghats starting from the border of Gujarat and Maharashtra, south of the Tapti river, and runs approximately 1,600 km (990 mi) through the states of Maharashtra, Goa, Karnataka, Kerala and finally at Tamil Nadu.
