= Akilathirattu Ammanai =

Ayyavazhi religious text (poem)

Akilathirattu Ammanai (Tamil: அகிலத்திரட்டு அம்மானை; akilam ("world"), thirattu ("collection"), ammanai ("ballad")), also called Thiru Edu ("venerable book"), is the main religious text of the Tamil belief system Ayyavazhi. The title is often abbreviated to Akilam or Akilathirattu.

Akilam includes more than 15,000 verses and is the largest collection of Ammanai literature in Tamil as well as one of the largest works in Tamil constructed by a single author.

== History ==
The most controversial versions of Akilam; Clockwise from top-left: Kalai Ilakkiya Peravai version, Anbukkodi Makkal-Iyakkam Version, Vaikundar Thirukkudumbam Version (1989) and DDPV

Author Hari Gopalan Citar states in the text that he wrote this book on a Friday, the twenty-seventh day of the Tamil month of Karthikai (13 December) in the year 1839 CE. The author claims that God woke him up during his sleep and commissioned him to record his dictation. Akilathirattu was recorded on palm leaves until 1939, when it was printed.

According to the author, the book is the story of God coming in this age, the Kali Yukam or Iron Age, to rule the world by transforming it into the Dharma Yukam. This story of faith weaves together the historical facts about Ayya Vaikundar and his activities with reinterpretations of episodes from the Hindu Puranas (mythologies) and Itihasas (epics). It is presented as if Vishnu is narrating the whole story to his consort Lakshmi.

Though the Citar Hari Gopalan wrote the book Akilam, he claimed that he did not know anything about the contents of the book. He woke up in the morning as usual and he didn't know what he had written the day before. Another legend says that he began it that night and continued through the following days. Others say that it was written beginning on Friday, 27th Karthikai (Tamil Calendar) 1016 M.E, and completed on the seventeenth day on the second Sunday of Margazhi (Tamil Calendar) 1016 M.E.

When Ayya Vaikundar avatar was completed, God reached Vaikundam. It contained the regulations of the Ayyavazhi sect. As per the instructions found there in Akilam, Ayyavazhi was preached by the Citars far and wide.

== Style ==
Akilam is in two parts: the first is an account of the ages preceding that of the present age, the Kali Yukam; and the second is an account of the activities of Ayya Vaikundar leading up to his attaining Vaikundam.

Akilathirattu is written as a poem in the Tamil language. The narration alternates between two subgenres called viruttam and natai. Both subgenres employ poetic devices like alliteration and hyperbatons. The text contains seventeen sections, and more than 15,000 verses. In a typical Ammanai style, Akilam maintains more than one context for its verses throughout the text. While the floating ideas of the lines could be comparatively easily communicated, the underlying theme couldn't be understood unless the background and culture are understood, specifically a foundational knowledge of the Hindu pantheon of gods, the Hindu scriptures, Dharmic concepts and philosophy, and other rudiments of the religion.

== Versions ==
The texts written by Hari Gopalan Citar are damaged and thus it is difficult to read the contents. The texts are still preserved as relics by his descendants. There are three versions, which were copied from the first version:

- Panchalagkuricchi Version
- Swamithoppe Version
- Kottangadu Version

Of these three, the Panchalankuricchi Version is believed to have been copied from the main version by Hari Gopalan Citar. The other two versions were copied later. Apart from these the Nariyan vilai Version, Varampetran-pantaram Version, and Saravanantheri Version are the other early palm-leaf versions of Akilam.

Other versions include the Palaramachandran version, the VTV, published twice, the Kalai Ilakkiya-peravai Version and the Vivekanandan Version. But of these, the Ayya Vaikundar Thirukkudumbam version is often criticized for adding and removing additional verses from various versions. Some argue that over 300 pages were adulterated. Thirukkudumbam claims that these additional lines were added from the early palm-leaf versions (Panchalankuricchi Version and Kottangadu Version), which are believed to have been missing from Akilam. This version is not widely accepted.

All the release versions except the Palaramachandran version organize the contents into seventeen sections as per the Thiru Eadu-vasippu partition. The Sentrathisai Ventraperumal version which was released in 1965 includes more than two-thousand verses not found in other versions. The Palaramachandran version is the widely accepted and the largest circulated version.

== Contents ==
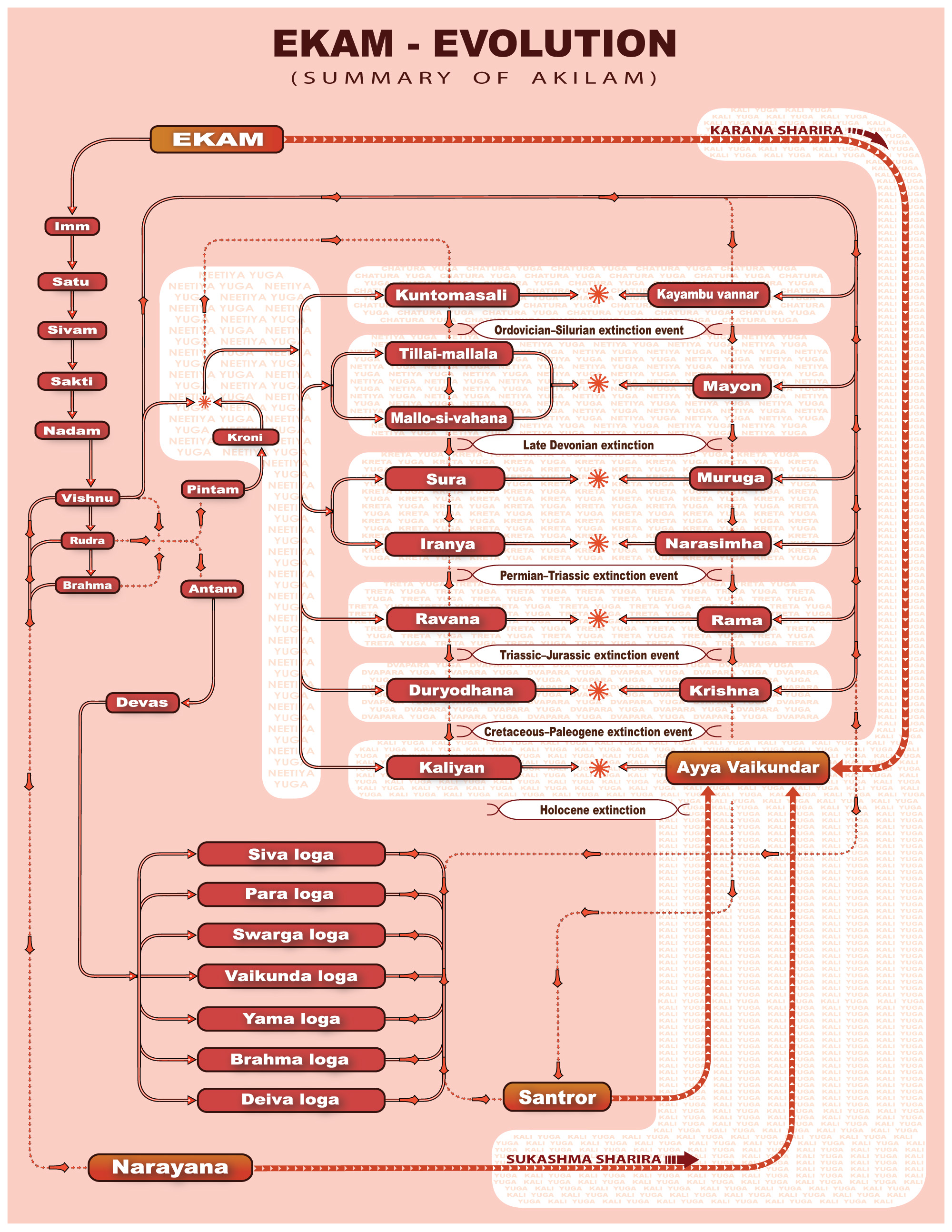
Evolution of Ekam, the source of whole existence (till Kali Yuga)

The book focuses on the devotion to Vaikundar, considered to be an aspect of the God Vishnu. It is a poetic narrative in Tamil intended to be an excellent compilation of the various aspects of Indian mythology and beliefs about God.

The first eight chapters of the book narrate the events starting from the creation of the Universe to the time exactly before the incarnation of Vaikundar. The ninth chapter describes in detail the events taking place in the divine plan during the incarnation of Vaikundar. The last eight chapters focus on the legendary, empirical, historical and mythical aspects pertaining to the life of Vaikundar.

=== Evolution and Yugas ===
The book starts with the explanation given by Vishnu to his consort Lakshmi about the evolution of Universe and of human beings. It is said that there is a total of eight aeons, or yugas, and we are currently in the seventh yuga called Kali Yuga, the age of deterioration. It is believed that for each yuga there is a demon that will be destroyed by Vishnu. In the first yuga, Kroni was born. Vishnu fragmented him into six pieces and each fragment will incarnate as demon in each Yuga. The first four yugas are said to be the Neetiya Yuga, Chatura Yuga, Nedu Yuga and Kretha Yuga. These four yugas do not have parallels in the mainstream Hinduism.

The fifth yuga is said to be the Treta Yuga in which the Lord Rama incarnated as human. The sixth yuga is the Dvapara Yuga, and there is a short but striking description of the life of Krishna and the Bharatha war. Additionally, there is said to be another event called the birth of Santror or noble people at the closure of Dvapara Yuga.

=== Kali Yuga ===
Kali Yuga, the seventh Yuga begins when the evil spirit called Kali (not to be confused with the mother goddess Kali) was born. Kali is believed to be cognate with the modern human beings. Then was born the Neesan, the demon for the Kali Yuga. It is said that this demon became the king of the earth in various places and tortured the lives of the Santror. Because of this Lord Vishnu advised Neesan to stop torturing the Santror. But he won't agree to Vishnu and would prefer to die rather than giving up. In order to stop the rule of Neesan and to bring an end to Kali-yuga, Vishnu made a plan to make Vaikundar incarnate as human.

==== The Incarnation ====
Vaikundar is believed to be the Son of Vishnu and Lakshmi. He was begotten inside the sea and sent as a human into the land. From the point of incarnation of Vaikundar, it is said that he was made the supreme of all godhead, and will destroy Neesan and also the evil Kali Yuga. It is also said that he will take all righteous people with him into the Vaikundam in the eighth yuga called as Dharma Yukam. Also, nothing is said about the period which follows Dharma yuga, which means that timeline is linear, and not circular as believed inside mainstream Hinduism.

== Sections ==
The Akilam is divided into seventeen parts:

- Akilam one
- Akilam two
- Akilam three: This section closes the Dwapara Yukam, and describes the birth of Santror and Makkal, their growth and marriage.
- Akilam four
- Akilam five
- Akilam six
- Akilam seven: This is considered a bit more important to all previous sections during religious studies since the events and plans related to Pre-Incarnational activities of Vaikundar starts from here onwards. This part contains the primary events of preparations to the incarnation of Vaikundar. It also contains the events of Jail to Kali, acceptance of Seven Virgins to take birth in the world etc.
- Akilam eight: At the end of Akilam eight, the Ayyavazhi and Hindu myths disassociate and are treated with higher importance than the previous section. This part contains the worldly birth of devas and Avatar of Vaikundar taken into the sea, Thiruvasakam - 1 and Thiru Nadana Ula.
- Akilam nine: Talks about the circumstances happening just prior and when Vaikundar incarnates in the world.
- Akilam ten: This part contains the events of Vaikundar's appearance at the sea-shore after the Avatar. It also contains the Thiruvasakam-2.
- Akilam eleven: This sub-section contains the Rules and regulations to God-heads given by Vaikundar, the Thiruvasakam-3, and the Tavam of Vaikundar.
- Akilam twelve: This part contains the Thiruvasakam-4, the destruction of devils, the arrival of Kaliyan's force to arrest Vaikundar and second Vinchai.
- Akilam thirteen: This part contains the events of the Arrest of Vaikundar, the Katuvai Sothanai and release of Vaikundar etc. It also includes the Muttappathi Vinchai - 1 and the first phase of Thuvayal Thavasu.
- Akilam fourteen: This part contains the events of Third Vinchai, arrest of Devas and the discussion of Vaikundar and Seven Virgins etc.
- Akilam fifteen: This part is also called 'Kalyana Vasippu'. It contains the events of the marriage of Vaikundar with the Seven Virgins narrated in a grant poetic style.
- Akilam sixteen: This part contains the events of Vaikundar's symbolic marriages with the Seven deities.
- Akilam seventeen: This part contains the events of Vaikundar's final Judgement to Kroni and sentencing him to hell and the dawn of Dharma Yukam.

== Teachings ==
Akilam teaches a set of values that are theological, sociological and philosophical. Of these, the ideas promoted by Akilam spans throughout the various teachings found in Hindu scriptures and present Hinduism in the first half and at the second, a set of revolutionary teachings, in all aspects were focussed. The theological teachings revolves around the supremacy of Vaikundar while the sociological teachings mainly focus on breaking up the inequalities prevalent in the society. The Philosophical ideas mainly focus the 'Ultimate oneness' of nature and all living beings.

=== Theosophy ===
All the major Hindu deities namely Brahma, Vishnu, Shiva, Sarasvati, Lakshmi, Parvati, Skanda, and Ganesha are mentioned directly in the mythology throughout the book. Also there is an indirect mention about Bible, Allah and Quran inside the book. A reference found in Akilam about Jesus is more direct than indirect. Also the book seems to stress that all texts and scriptures are true and have a share about the truth of the Divine. It is notable that Akilam is heavily against creating religions as it does not mention the term 'religion' at least once anywhere in the text and do refers only to God-heads, concepts and scriptures.

=== Sociology ===
It is said that social inequality and destruction of caste ethics are the main aspects of the Kali Yuga. So the entire book focuses on social equality and strictly against Jati or the Indian caste system. But it also says that the 'Varnashrama Dharma' system was perfect until the end of Dvapara Yuga. Also, there are traces of references to leading a chaste life and vegetarian diet. There is a strict condemnation about the religious fundamentalism especially of the Abrahamic traditions.

=== Philosophy ===
The key philosophy in the book is that human beings are by themselves separated from God by the influence of Kali, and Vaikundar has come for their redemption.

== See also ==
- Ayya Vaikundar
- Hari Gopalan Citar
- List of Ayyavazhi-related articles
