= Ayyavazhi symbolism =

The Ayyavazhi symbolism deals with the symbols which are used in or used to represent Ayyavazhi. Though Akilam the scripture of Ayyavazhi does not point out any symbol directly, there are a few symbols which are used for representing Ayyavazhi which came into practice gradually.

Amongst these, the Lotus with Namam, which is the symbolic summary of Akilam, is the commonly used and most accepted symbol.

== Lotus and namam ==
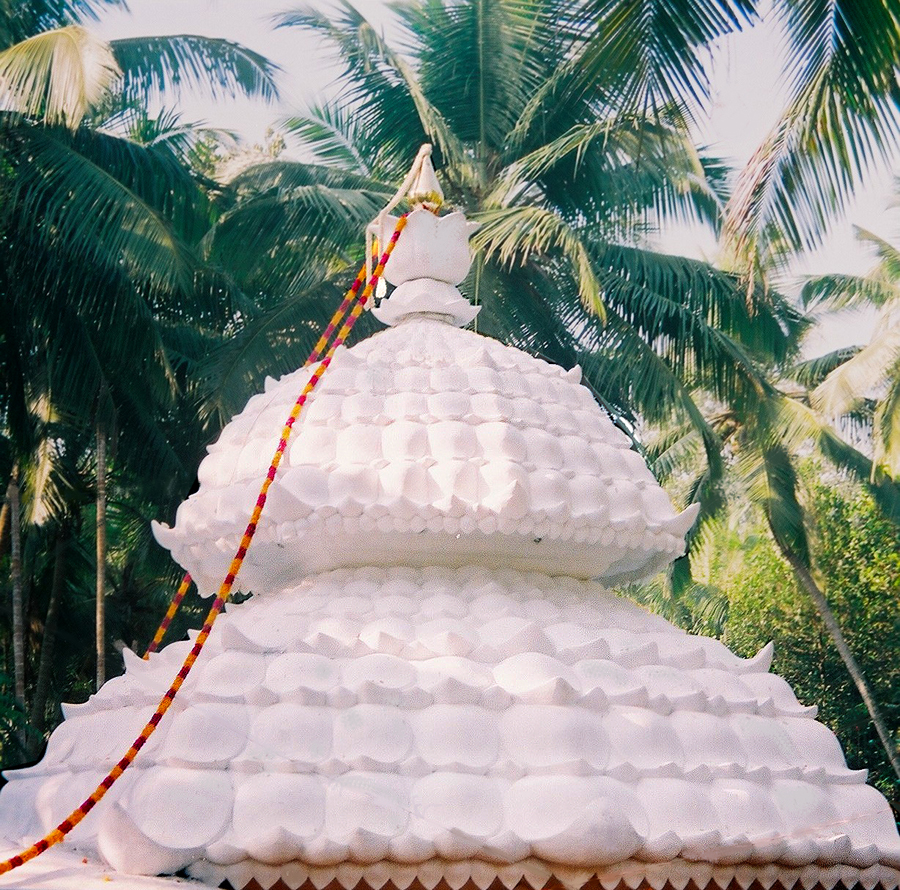
The '1008 petal' arrangement used as roof-architecture in a Thangal near Thiruvattar, Tamil Nadu.

The symbol of the Ayyavazhi is a lotus carrying a flame-shaped white 'Namam'. The lotus represents the 1,008-petalled Sahasrara (in Tamil, Ladam) and the Namam represents the Aanma Jyothi or atman, sometimes translated as "soul" or "self". There are references for Thirunamam in both primary and secondary scriptures, Akilattirattu Ammanai and Arul Nool. Though the overall consideration of the whole contents of Akilam focuses on the concept derived from the symbol 'Lotus carrying Namam', it seems that there is no direct reference for it in the scriptures. But according to some legends this symbol was in use in Ayyavazhi from the early 1940s.

Since the Sahasrara is symbolised as Lotus, no stem is drawn while designing art of the symbol. Seven(up) + seven(down) petals are used commonly. Also a new way of architecture is being developed in constructing Nizhal Thangals in which the inverted Lotus petals (as in sahasrara) are used as a design over the roof.

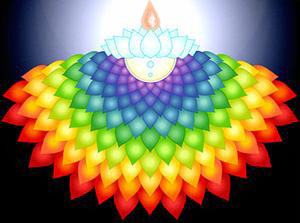
The Sahasrara, symbolised in Ayyavazhi as 'Lotus carrying Namam'

The mythical narration of akilam about the eight yugas is often viewed philosophically as eight chakras. The first Neetiya Yukam as Bindu and the final state of absolute bliss, Sahasrara is said to be the Dharma Yukam. In this series the energy of consciousness of oneself is to be raised from Bindu (Neetiya Yukam) to the final Sahasrara (Dharma Yukam) to experience the absolute 'bliss'. The reigning power in the final Dharma Yukam(Sahasrara) is Ekam or the supreme absolute, and thus the Ayyavazhi's symbol seems to be derived from Akilam. And the symbol of Ayyavazhi, 'Lotus with Namam' shows it; Vaikundar is being experienced in Sahasrara.

As per Hindu legends this Sahasrara chakra has '1000 petals' . But in Ayyavazhi symbolism it was considered as 1008. In Akilam or Arul Nool there are no verses to treat this term '1000' but quite commonly the number '1008' is mentioned. Also the year of incarnation of Vaikundar is 1008 M.E. On backing these scriptural backgrounds, 1008 petal arrangement is followed in Ayyavazhi symbolism.

== Other phenomenological symbols ==
Akilam clearly points to the 'Flame shaped' single white Namam and its ideology clearly focuses on the importance of the '1008 petaled' Lotus. But there are traces that the Vaishnavite triple Namam is being used though rarely in Ayyavazhi. The northern entrance of the Swamithope pathi carries such a form of Namam with the Holy Conch and the Chakra(of Vishnu) on its two sides. Secondly, the Palaramachandran version of Akilathirattu also carries similar Namam until the ninth impression, while it has been replaced by the Single white Namam from the tenth impression onwards. This is one of the phenomenological variations that is seen in the late 19th and the early 20th century Ayyavazhi. It is evident that this symbol, ' Lotus and Namam ' has been used in Ayyavazhi from the mid-twentieth century.

There is also a practice of using 'Garuda' as the symbol of Ayyavazhi. The previous flag mast of Swamithope pathi which was replaced by the new one in the 1980s, mounts a brass image (idol) of Garuda at the top. In Ambala Pathi still the flag mast carries an idol of Garuda. The practice of using Conch and Chakra (of Vishnu) also seems to be current. A stone carving at Vadava mugam (possibly of late 19th century C.E), the northern entrance of Swamithope pathi includes this ' Conch & Chakra '. As per Akilam the Chakra of Vishnu is bought as boon by Kaliyan and now it is with him. So the basic logic of Akilam is against these practices.

Again, using idols and personifications is heavily countered by Akilam, but is still in practice among a minority section of the followers. Also there is a practice of using only the 'Thirunamam' without the 1008 Petaled Lotus. This too is occasionally in practice.

== See also ==
- Thirunamam
- List of Ayyavazhi-related articles
- Dharma Yukam
