= Ayyavazhi Dharma =

The Ayyavazhi Dharma is an approach to the spirt of Ayyavazi. Akilathirattu Ammanai scripture teaches from two different perspectives. One in sociology as charity and truth (in behavior) and another under spirituality to attain the stage of Oneness, unified into Lord Vaikundar. This state of ultimate oneness is called Dharma Yukam or Dharma Pathi. Akilam also says that, Dharma is the only living wheel. The sociological way is suggested to be followed by everyone to attain the spiritual state of Dharma.

== Spiritual conception ==
On the spiritual plane, the concept of Dharma is propounded as a 'principle of righteousness' . Ayyavazhi asserts that the prime motive of the Avatar of Vaikundar was to establish Dharma in this world by destroying the evil force of Kaliyan. The definition of Kali in Ayyavazhi is the materialized life. Spiritual understanding of Dharma in Ayyavazhi is life in ultimate harmony with nature or unbounded by space and time. The concept 'Ekam', 'the ultimate oneness' in Akilam points this out clearly.

And after ending the Kali Yukam, Dharma Yukam, the 'world of righteousness', is said to be ruled over by Vaikundar as an everlasting King. One religion and one race. All the people will be with supreme bliss and knowledge. But on the way, it eliminated caste identities by stating that this was not suited for the present Kali Yukam.

== Yuga Dharma ==
As per Ayyavazhi ideology, Lord Vaikundar incarnated in the world to destroy the evil force of Kali, the sixth foremost and the most serious manifestation of the evil Kroni. It emphasized the serious nature of Kaliyan and the boons claimed by him. So the power of the 'Supreme Ekam' was given at birth to the son of Lord Narayana in the Name of Vaikundar. Hence Vaikundar is a unique avatar and the only able power to destroy Kali. Hence it's necessary to follow Vaikundar, who is not influenced by Kali to overcome Kali. Vaikundar was the only eligible figure to forgive Kali's sins since he was the only figure unaffected by Kali. Vaikundar and his teachings must be spread. Spreading the gospel of Vaikundar is told as the Yuga dharma for this Kali Yuga.

So the spread of Vaikundar's teachings is taught to be necessary for the fast destruction of Kali. Vaikundar ordered his followers to propagate his teachings. The five Citars of Vaikundar and the Thuvayal Pandarams are the first among the propagators of these teachings. Vaikundar's teachings spread even before Akilathirattu Ammanai is written down.

== Dharma for other beings ==
After teaching the Dharma for human beings, Vaikundar taught Dharma for Animals, birds, reptiles, plants etc. He ordered the animals to live in harmony with each other and not quarrel. He ordered them to take only vegetarian foods (to eat only plants). They all were ordered to drink water from same place. They were asked to obey only Vaikundar and to remain with forbearance. Then he ordered the birds to live in harmony with one another and not to quarrel. The plants were ordered to maintain patience and forbearance and to remain humble. From human beings to plants, all are ordered to maintain forbearance and to live in harmony with one another.

== See also ==
- Ayyavazhi ethics
- Main teachings of Ayya Vaikundar
- Neetham
- Ayyavazhi theology
