= Vaikundar Thirukkudumbam version =

Vaikundar Thirukkudumbam Version (VTV) is one among the released versions of Akilam, the scripture of Ayyavazhi. It was named after the socio-religious welfare organisation Ayya Vaikundar Thirukkudumbam, which released it.

As the Vivekanandan Version it was claimed this version was released including all accidentally as well as purposely omitted verse from all editions of the Palaramachandaran Version referring to the palm-leaf versions of Kottangadu, Swamithope, Thamaraikulam as well as Panchalankurichi versions. This version also includes various sub-sections as the other versions. This version was heavily criticised unlike any other versions by many followers and the Swamitope Pathi Dharmaghartta's for the addition and removal of various verses that are found in the Palaramachandran version. It was argued that such additions and removal was performed in more than 300 pages.

This version was first released in 1989 and the second edition in 2000.

== See also ==
- Akilattirattu Ammanai
- Sentratisai Ventraperumal version
- Arul Nool
