= Ayyavazhi phenomenology =

Ayyavazhi phenomenology is the phenomenological variations found in Ayyavazhi society, worship centers etc. from their holy text Akilattirattu Ammanai.

Though the Ayyavazhi's and its worship centers accept those in Akilam as the guideline to be followed, there are considerable misunderstandings and inclusions in the socio-religious society of Ayyavazhi. Many practices, rituals and ideas are phenomenologically adapted from the pre-existing traditions which in turn counters the teachings of Akilam.

== In Worship centers ==
The Pathis and the Nizhal Thangals are considered as the primary centers propagating Ayyavazhi teachings, apart from the religious status and relations to each other. Also, these centers in common are the grounds where the theoretical ideas of the scriptures being practiced, though the Nizhal Thangals rather than the Pathis have their own limits. Besides those rituals, there are a lot of phenomenological inclusions and exclusions in those centers, both directly and indirectly.

=== In Pathis ===
Swamithope pathi, which is considered the headquarters of Ayyavazhi, seems to be the largest phenomenological than any other Pathis. Akilam clearly states the variations between Mudisoodum perumal and Vaikundar, advocating Perumal as a normal person, but a scholar and a respected one. On the other hand Vaikundar to be the incarnation of Narayana (Ekam) and as the supreme power (God) on the other.

Secondly, the second part of Akilam is dedicated to revealing the monotheism with a mythical storyline. But currently in Swamithope pathi breaking all those two rules, there are separate Panividais for Paradevathai and Paal Payyan, claiming them as the wife and son of him respectively. Those two claims are based on another claim that Mudisoodum perumal himself is Vaikundar.

In Ambala Pathi there is a separate Panividai for Kali, a folk deity in the Vadakku Vasal, even though Kali is being kept inactive in Vadavamugam as imprisonment. There is also a claim that Ambala Pathi is the Primary among the Pathis. There is such a claim from Mutta Pathi that it was primary, though the religious importance of Swamithope from Akilam is greater than any other Pathis.

=== In Nizhal Thangals ===
Nizhal Thangals which were the secondary (to pathis) worship centers constructed for the means of worship and for teaching the gospels and philosophy of Vaikundar and Akilattirattu Ammanai, lost their unique ideology and get reinforced with the folk form of worship which were common throughout the country, mainly because of the lack of knowledge of the Thangal Panividaiyalars in Akilam. Most of them lost their identity as Nizhal Thangals and began to be noticed as 'Narayana Swami temples' as in Hindu Vaishnavism. Many Thangals, mostly in the northeastern parts provide panividais for the Seven-deities, Kali and other folk deities, though as secondary, in spite of the fact that Akilam condemns all those separate identities for them apart from Vaikundar. Some Thangals also provide idols for those deities and some others conduct 'Vilakku Poojas' for Vaikundar imitating from Hindu (Shakthism) temples. Some thangals also claim themselves as 'Pathis' though Akilam clearly points out the difference between Pathis and Thangals.

Also Akilam seems to accredit the practice of Shamanism, by the Panividaiyalars(those who conduct the prayers) in the Padmasana poster and in closed eyes, uttering the fate (those to happen) of the commoners for them by getting divinized by the power of Ayya. But today majority of the Panividaiyalars stand and dance in a tribal system of worship.

== Theological ==
Akilam especially the second part clearly provides rich ideas in quantity and quality about the uniqueness and supremacy of Vaikundar and his power-relation to other lesser gods. But many followers relate Vaikundar to Vishnu and as merely the incarnation of him. Some others include him within the Ten Avatars replacing others while some denominations relate him to Kalki and on the other hand him-self as Kalki. Some of them also reject the Trinity conception and use to consider the Narayana to be the supreme as in Vaishnavism. Some denominations especially the Ayya Vaikunda Siddhasharama view him as a yogi on the way of describing Advaita and Moksha through Akilam, despite Vaikundar's supreme nature throughout Akilam. Overall though all the followers consider Akilam as the supreme holy script, most of them are completely unaware of the unique monotheistic ideology and the monistic philosophy of it except a handful of scholars in Akilam.

== See also ==
- List of Ayyavazhi-related articles
- Nizhal Thangals
- Ayyavazhi rituals
- Akilattirattu Ammanai
