= Ayyavazhi theology =

Theology of the Ayyavazhi religion (often classified a sect of Hinduism)

Ayyavazhi theology is the theology of the South Indian sect of Hinduism known as Ayyavazhi. Several fundamental theological beliefs distinguish the Ayyavazhi tradition from Hinduism.

== Relations between Vaikundar Ekam and other lesser Gods ==
Ayyavazhi believes in one God (Bhagavan Vishnu), but recognizes that the one God Vishnu can appear to humans in a multiplicity of names and forms (avataras). The first half of Akilam asserts the existence and power-status of different god-heads and in the second half after the incarnation of Vaikundar though they have a secondary place, they do exist. Especially, though all powers were surrendered to Vaikundar, Narayana acts a double role throughout the incarnation of Vaikundar, as the Father of Vaikundar. So Akilam accepts that all god-heads exist. But Vaikundar is the only powerful and supreme, which channels Ayyavazhi theology towards Henotheism.

But God is, in the highest sense, one: formless (no material form, only spiritual/transcendental), infinite, and eternal. God is changeless and is the source of consciousness (jiva-atmas) as well as the supreme consciousness (Paramatma) itself. God is beyond time, space, and causation yet still exists within everything and every living entity. Being formless, God is genderless (Vishnu is male, but can accept the female form of Mohini). The name Ekam is mentioned quite often in Ayyavazhi scriptures. But beyond the mere mention of the 'term' several times, no longer description is provided for the word (Ekam is similar to Ek-Omkar (One AUM) of Sikhism). The term Ekam in Tamil gives simply the meaning, "one and the incomparable supreme". This is some sort of monistic definition about god from Ayyavazhi theology.

There are a series of lesser god-heads mentioned in Akilam with minor powers. Vaikundar is viewed on one hand as the incarnation of Ekam and on the other hand as being equal in powers to him. But during the encounter of Vaikundar with the King of Travancore, a verse of Akilam states that Ekam itself was created by Vaikundar. So Vaikundar would be superior to all.

Regarding Vaikundar, Ekam remains one among the three in the Trinity in Vaikundar during the incarnation. So all qualities of Ekam (changeless attributes etc...) fits also to Vaikundar. Strengthening this view, a series of quotes from Arul Nool portraits Vaikundar as eternal and reveals his Universal form.

=== Mythical Narration ===
Evolution of Ekam, through the ages (yugas)

The mythical narrative speaks of Sivam (matter) and Shakti (energy) as the next evolved powers from the supreme Ekam. Then the Three lesser God-heads (i.e., Trimurthi) which are Sivan, Vethan and Thirumal evolved from this Shakthi. It also speaks of several further evolved lesser Gods. But in Kali Yukam, due to the cruel nature of the boons offered to Kaliyan, Thirumal (the then supreme power) cannot destroy the sixth fragment of Kroni directly so all God-heads were unified into the Ekam, and Ekam Incarnated in the world as a Turine god (Ekam, Narayana and Human) in the form of Vaikundar to overcome the boons and to destroy Kali. Since all were unified in Vaikundar, in Kali Yukam Vaikundar he was the Supreme Power and he was the only worshipable God. So in this regard Ayyavazhi is also viewed as a monotheistic religion.

Akilattirattu Ammanai also speaks of Dharma Yukam in which Vaikundar rules like a king. There, Vaikundar will be the undisputed power ruling the fourteen worlds. No such a (i.e.,) a single God to rule the fourteen worlds exists. Also, no such throne to rule the fourteen worlds exists. But immediately after the incarnation of Vaikundar, Narayana told Vaikundar in the Muttappathi Vinchai that the incomparable throne is growing for him. The mythical narration of Ayyavazhi shows Vaikundar as a supreme power.

== Dualistic dimension ==
The Kroni, the primordial manifestation of evil, was fragmented into six. Each was destroyed in successive Yugas; finally, Kaliyan (the last) will be sentenced to hell after the final judgement which led to the consideration of Ayyavazhi towards dualism. Kaliyan is called an evil spirit which came to the world. So it was commonly accepted that the destruction of the maya (evil spirit) was symbolised in such a way. But the scripture is most commonly concerned with Ultimate Oneness right from the beginning to the end. So the dualistic views were contrasted by the monistic narration. Also the contents of Arul Nool, based on the teachings of Vaikundar, which were believed to be written by arulalarkal and Citars, is completely monistic.

== Pantheism and panentheism ==
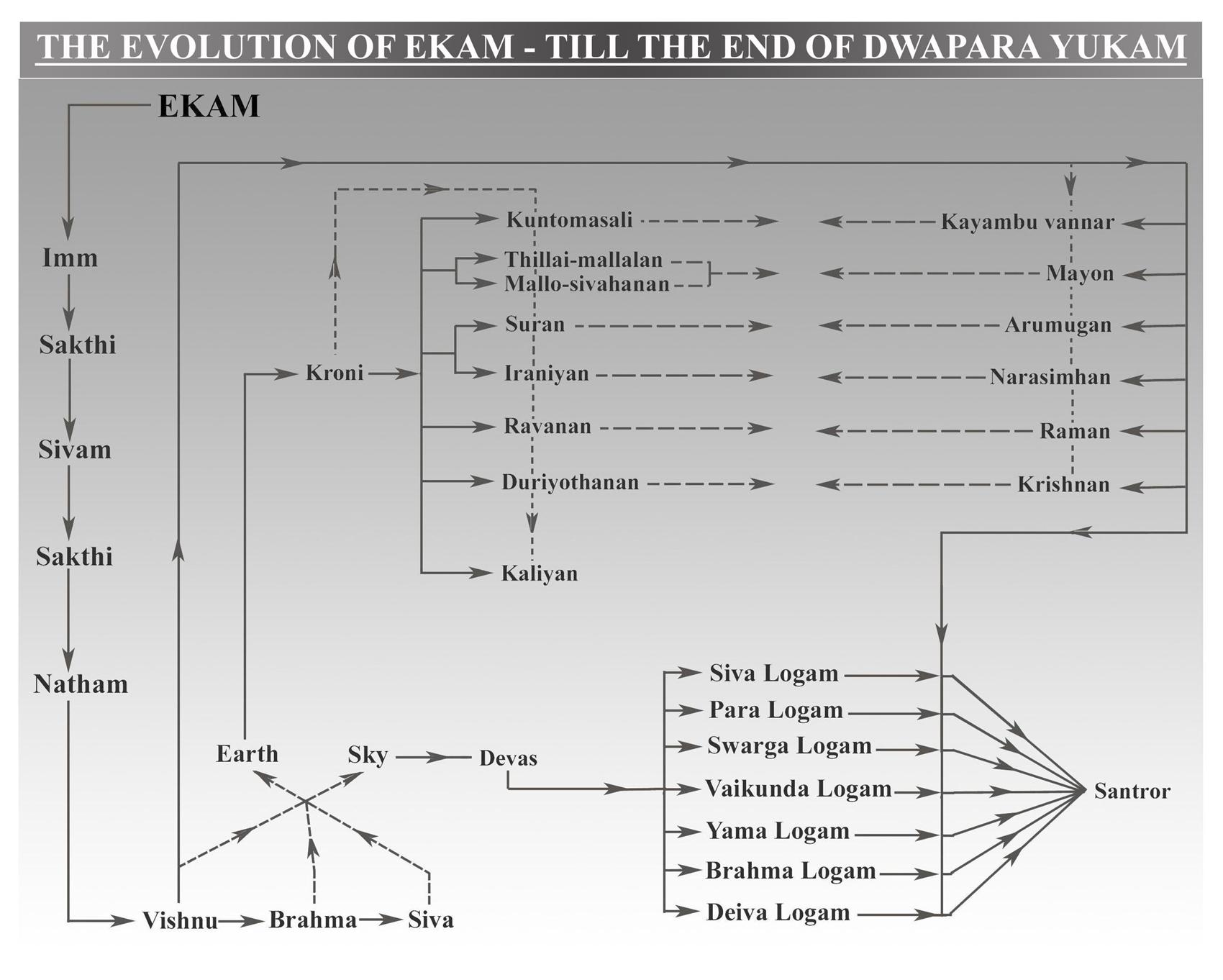
The evolution of Ekam till Dvapara Yuga

Though Ayyavazhi is mostly connected with the concept of Ekam, some followers advocate Ayyavazhi as Pantheistic, sticking to the concept of Ekan (one who appears as oneness or Ekam in Tamil) which was used to refer as God in Akilam seven. In this expression, the Akilam lays the groundwork for viewing Ayyavazhi as a pantheistic faith. In a quote in Kappu, the very first part of Akilam one, the author of Akilam says, "By keeping us inside yourself, please help us".Akilam1:12.

Regarding Panentheism, there are many quotes in Akilam to suggest it, but there are more that reveal Ayyavazhi as monistic. For example, during the Vinchai, inside the sea, Narayana, seeing Vaikundar, says that "You are Sivan, you are Thirumal, you are Vethan, you are the tapas, and you are the one who is omnipresent in all which exists". And when Vaikundar is jailed in Thiruvananthapuram he alleviates the Santror by saying "I am the one who created the Ekam and the one who is omnipresent." -- (Akilam 13:395).

== Narayana in Ayyavazhi ==
Lord Narayana has the most important role in Ayyavazhi theology compared to any other God-heads from Hindu tradition. The internal evidence states that the primary scripture of Ayyavazhi, Akilattirattu Ammanai was told by Narayan to his consort Lakshmi, which was heard by Hari Gopalan Citar.

=== Narayana and Siva Relation ===
The importance of Narayana in the theology of Ayyavazhi varies through the ages. Before the creation, though the three god-heads, Siva, Brahma and Vishnu are all treated with equal status Siva is the supreme or over-all power. All the powers came from Siva and the final words for all sort of functioning - creation, maintaining and Destroying all will be from Siva and that will be done by others. This view on Siva is similar to Saivism.

After six yugas, during the creation of Kaliyan in the seventh Kali Yuga, Siva hearing the words of Devas without discussing with Vishnu, created Kaliyan though they have a deed that, all asuras should be created after discussing with each of the Trimurti. Due to this action of Siva, Vishnu refused to incarnate in the world for destroying the final fragment of Kroni. So Siva, Brahma and all other devas surrendered all their powers to Narayana. So from here onwards all others were puppet-reign and Narayana is the supreme universal power. This view is similar to that of Vaisnavism on Vishnu.

=== Vaikundar and Narayana - Relation ===
Several episodes, as narrated in the Akilam (the holy text of Ayyavazhi), describe Ayya Vaikundar as an Avatar of Vishnu (a Tamil name for Vishnu).

All these episodes — starting with his 'birth' at sea as the 'son' of Narayana, the performance of the grand Tavam, the symbolic shamanic actions of incinerating the demons, the seizing of esoteric powers, and the unifying of the deities unto himself — highlight the important message that Ayya Vaikundar came as the avatar of Narayana. The followers of Ayyavazhi believe and worship him as a deity, the incarnation of Narayana. (see: Ayyavazhi Trinity)

==== Vaikundar as Narayana ====
After the birth in the sea, Vaikundar was addressed by Akilam quite commonly as Narayana. In most of the teachings of Vaikundar to the people, he portraits himself as incarnation of Narayana. The theological definition from Akilam about Vaikundar too focuses mostly on the same point. The incarnation of Vaikundar in the world is to destroy Kali and it was the duty of Narayana to do this. So in that sense the view is strengthened that Vaikundar is Narayana himself.

Then the aim of the austerity of seven virgins towards vishnu to marry them is fulfilled in the Vaikunda Avatharam by Vaikundar.

==== Vaikundar as son of Narayana ====
Right from the beginning of the incarnation of Vaikundar in the sea, Vaikundar calls Narayana as Father, through the vinchais. The episode comes in a way that the whole details, powers, instructions, and laws were given to Vaikundar by Narayana. Then after Vaikundar comes out of the sea, he is called as Narayana by devas.

Summing up, the Father - son relationship between Narayana and Vaikundar is highlighted during the three vinchai.

== Ayya Vaikundar as the supreme deity ==
In Ayyavazhi, Ayya Vaikundar is considered the supreme deity and an incarnation of Mayon. Due to this belief, the followers of Ayyavazhi seem to have taken him to be the centre of all divinities. He was the incarnation, not only of Thirumal, but also of Sivan and Brahma as well. In order to demonstrate that he was the supreme deity of the present age, Ayya Vaikundar not only performed symbolic marriages in which all surrounding popular deities were surrendered and unified unto himself, he also did away with refractory evil spirits. (see:Ayyavazhi Trinity)

Right from the beginning of the Vinchai of Tiruchendur Vaikundar has been focused as the ultimate power or incarnation of the supreme Ekam. All sort of administrations - Creating maintaining and destroying were all handled to Vaikundar through the Vinchai by Narayana, who was responsible for all these actions from the beginning of Kali Yuga. Narayan also says about all different divine powers and deities of the world and assure that, "During the avatar, all such divine powers, deities and attributes will be surrendered and will be unified into you".

=== Ekam - Narayana - Vaikundar ===
The relations between the Ekam, Narayana and Vaikundar were understood as having different implications found in several verses of Ayyavazhi scriptures. Thiru Nadana Ula, the section which describes the situational changes that are going to happen in the world from the advent of Vaikundar, say the relation between these three power-heads as, the 'Ekam is taken inside Narayana and with that power Vaikundar is being given birth' which means, Ekam is regenerated as Vaikundar in Kali Yuga by Narayana concluding that Narayana is the Father of the Supreme Vaikundar.

=== Vaikundar revealing his Supremacy ===
Vaikundar, by his various incarnational activities reveals him as the supreme power apart from the relationship of Narayana.

After the incarnation Vaikundar at the sea-shore of Tiruchendur provided Rules and regulations to God-heads. During this the supremacy of Vaikundar is revealed by the event of Vaikundar ordering all devas of the cosmos the do's and don'ts which are to be followed. Even here Vaikundar was stated as the incarnation of Ekam.

Another area in which Vaikundar has been high lightened as the supreme universal power is the Marriage with the deities. During this, Vaikundar unified into him all the deities. He unified into him Parvati in the form of Siva, unified Lakshmi in the form of Vishnu, Sarasvati in the form of Brahma, Valli and Deyvanai as Muruga etc., showing that Vaikundar is the incarnation of the supreme power, from which all these lower divine powers are generated.

Then at the end during the Dharma Yuga, Vaikundar is placed in the Throne of the Fourteen worlds. Before Vaikundar, there was no single god-head who ruled the whole fourteen worlds. This episode shows the supremacy of Vaikundar.

== See also ==
- List of Ayyavazhi-related articles

== Sources ==
- G. Patrick, Religion and Subaltern Agency, Chapter 5, Religious Phenomenon of Ayyavazhi.
- Tha. Krushnanathan (2000) Ayya Vaikundarin Vazhvum Sinthanaiyum, Thinai veliyeetagam.
