= Anbukkodimakkal Thirucchabai =

Anbukkodimakkal Thirucchabai is a democratic bureau established by the religious headquarters of Ayyavazhi in the late 20th century. It was one among the latest developments in the religious history of Ayyavazhi.

In every village there will be formed a bench which was democratically elected. These village committees forms a block committee. Separate rules will be provided for them from the headquarters. And Bala Prajapathi Adikalar was the convenor of this bureau. This was formed mainly to organise the religion. Many conference are held in various cities in South India including Chennai, Marthandam, Vallioor, Nagercoil and Thiruvananthapuram. But some denominations of Ayyavazhi won't accept this Thirucchabai though most of them accepts Swamithope as the headquarters.

== See also ==
- Ayyavazhi movements
- Ayyavazhi Publications
- Ayyavazhi phenomenology
- Payyan dynasty
