= Kalicchi =

Kalicchi is married to Kaliyan according to Akilathirattu Ammanai, the holy book of the Ayyavazhi sect of Hinduism. She is similar to Eve in the Christian tradition.

== Kaliyan ==
As soon as Kaliyan was born in an inverted form he was presented to Shiva. The Devas asked him to request boons from Shiva. Kaliyan replied, "Will that fellow, by wearing a snake on his neck, and ash on forehead and seated on a skin of elephant, be ready to give me what I need?" With this, Kaliyan insulted Shiva. By hearing this the devas asked him, "Don’t insult him. He was the one who created the world and offered food for every life in the world. He was the light that was not even visible to Mayon and Nathan. (This is an allusion to when Shiva appeared in a form of endless lingam of light when there was a dispute between Mayon and Nathan as to who is the greatest and in order to subdue their pride.) He will be able to give what you claim." Then Kaliyan asked, "If he was the one who created the world ask him to create a beautiful girl for me."

== Appearance of Kalicchi ==
Shiva queried, "Shall I create a girl who was in equal strength with you?" For this was how Kaliyan defined how his wife should be. She must be more beautiful than I am, but of half the strength. Her mouth should be beautiful. She must have breasts like palmyra nuts. Her face, vulva, eyes and vision should be beautiful. Her hips should be narrow. Her hands, legs, teeth and her walk should be beautiful. Also her thigh should be beautiful. The front of her chest and the back of her head must be beautiful. She must dress beautifully. She must be created with a sweet fragrance. She must be with a great beauty so that the Trimurti should be lascivious with her.

== Birth of Kalicchi ==
By hearing this Shiva asked Parvathi what to do. She replied, "As per his deed create him a woman by take a rib-bone from him. Don’t delay." Then as per the request of Kaliyan, Shiva decided to create Kalicchi. Shiva's vision falls keely on a left rib-bone of Kaliyan, and he in his mind thinks Manmadan. The rib-bone transformed into a woman, exactly of Kaliyan's description. Her appearance created more lust in the mind of Kaliyan. As soon as Kaliyan saw her he ran and kissed her. He kept her by his side. He only cared about her and forgot all about Shiva.

== See also ==
- Kaliyan
- Ayyavazhi mythology
