= Vivekanandan version =

Vivekanandan Version is one among the release versions of Akilam. It was the only version released so far which includes the original source-text as well as the interpretations combainingly. It was named after the publication Vivekananada Pathippakam.

It was claimed that this version was released including all accidentally omitted verse from all editions of Palaramachandaran Version referring to the palm-leaf versions of Kottangadu, Swamithope, Thamaraikulam as well as Panchalankurichi versions.

The part one includes the event up to the incarnation of Vaikundar and the second section continues till the end of Dharma Yukam.

== See also ==
- Akilattirattu Ammanai
- Sentratisai Ventraperumal version
- Arul Nool
