= Ammanai =

Type of Tamil poetry

Ammanai (Tamil: அம்மானை) is a type of Tamil poetry belonging to the family of "Tharavu kochchaga kalippa". This is a type of poetry associated with a game of the same name that was popular with teen girls. Ammanai will be in the form of questions and answers. Ammanai generally follows the rules of a venpa, but can occasionally have kalithalais and belongs to the kalippa family.

The earliest ammanai poetry was composed by Saint Manikkavasagar. There is an ammanai which is said to be sung by the poets Ottakuththar and Pugalzendhi. During later times, it became something like a historical ballad. Ramappaiyan Ammanai was composed to extol the wars fought by Dalavay Ramappaiyan who was the general of Tirumalai Nayakkar of Madurai. Akilathirattu Ammanai, often called as Akilam which includes more than 15,000 verses and is the largest Ammanai literature.

The Sivagangai Seemai Kummi/Ammanai relates the final wars of the valiant Marudhu Brothers of Sivagangai.

The Palm-leaf manuscript's on Ariviyur Nagarathar Ammanai was also found in Sivagangai district which explains the history of the Nagarathar community.
