= Shamanism in Ayyavazhi =

Shamanism is practiced in Ayyavazhi, a Hindu denomination predominantly found in South India. According to Ayyavazhi practitioners, it has been practiced since the period of Lord Vaikundar. At present certain people who are considered to be posed by the divine power use to perform shamanism in many Ayyavazhi worship centers. Though a whole acceptance from the followers in not there for this practise, several followers accept this. They claim that this practise was based on quotes on scriptures such as "to convey certain messages to the ordinary folk." Some also believe that through the words of these possessed persons one could be able to know what God tells about him or herself or their activities.

As part of shamanic practice, they exhort the people on various matters, practiced divination (Kanakku) to discern the causes of sickness and misfortunes, and 'foretold future happenings' . Some LMS reports attest to the prevalence of shamans and shamanistic practices in centres of Ayyavazhi. This is now in practice in some worship centres. The Akilathirattu seems to have recognizes shamanic acts of worship. A quote in Arul Nool reads, "For imparting knowledge and making things clear, I kept those who practice divination in the temples." Though shamanism was practised in Ayyavazhi, it was accepted by the scriptures only as an ignorant way of worship (beginning stage in worship) or the initial way to teach a beginner the metaphysics.

Desika Vinayaham Pillai, the popular poet from Travancore, in his book Mammakkal Vali Manmiyam, alludes to the existence of practice of such 'kanakku' at Ayyavazhi centres of worship.

== Lord Vaikundar as a shaman ==
Apart from the belief on the triune power within Vaikundar, some people also believe that Lord Vaikundar is carried within SivaNarayana after the incarnation of Vaikundar, i.e. sometimes he acts as Vaikundar, sometimes as Shiva, sometimes as Narayana etc. All these complex ideas are made on the basis of different implications of phrase from Ayyavazhi scriptures.

Lord Vaikundar as a shaman had the faculty of ecstatic religiosity that manifested in modes of trances. Many texts from Akilathirattu and Arul Nool are believed to point to his giving out instructions to people from a state of such ecstatic religiosity. They speak of this state as that of ‘singing’, uttering predictions in a style of hoot, lamentations etc. For example, a text in Akilathirattu says that he "danced in a circle", saying, "today a word of instructions ha scome upon me", and then, from the state, exhorted the people to undertake a tavam. Another text in Arul Nool reads as "I, a 'pallikkanakkan' (one who practises divination in a temple), am coming by dancing on a point", and another as, "I came to make you dance, sing, and spring you in ecstasy".

=== Symbolic shamanic actions ===
The marriage with the Seven Virgins of Narayana and the unifying of the seven deities of Vaikundar are also seen as shamanic actions of Lord Vaikundar.

==== Unifying the deities into himself ====
Lord Vaikundar seems to have enacted a 'symbolic ritual drama’ whereby he sought to tell the people that he had unified the powerful deities of the surrounding area unto himself. He did so by a method called as Ekanai kalyanam (meaning, 'representational marriage' - a method whereby deities were made to 'come upon' certain persons who became their human media, and, then, a marriage ceremony was performed with these human media). Akilathirattu narrates very elaborately the grand manner in which ekanai kalyanam was conducted for Vaikundar with some popular deities of the surrounding area such as Kumari Pakavati, Parvati, Mantaikkattal, Leksmi, Valli, Teivanai and Pumatantai. The gist of the narration is what follows, The deities were made to 'come upon' some of the female devotees who were in the gathering. Vaikundar, then, 'entered into a conversation' with them and 'convinced' each deity that time had arrived for them to get 'unified' unto himself so as to end the kaliyukam. He then 'married' them one by one and unified them all into himself. He seems to have enacted this symbolic drama at Ambalappathi, one among the Pathis.

==== Marriage with the Seven Virgins ====
Vaikundar enacted yet another ekanaikalyanam in which 'married' the mythical seven virgins. When people were gathered around him, Vaikundar caused some people to 'become presentations', the human media, of the seven virgins. He, then, enacted the symbolic marriage with the 'seven virgins'.

Akilathirattu says that when this marriage took place, The Santror realised that all the curses incurred by them had been absolved henceforth, and the end of Kaliyukam and the dawn of tarmayukam became imminent. All these events took place in the ambience of the ecstatic religiosity that surrounded the gathering of the followers of Vaikundar.

== Criticism over Shamanism ==
This shamanic actions in the worship centres of Ayyavazhi is quite often criticised by a large number of followers. Commonly it was believed that in 'Ayyavazhi possessions', the possessed person use to sit in the Padmasana posture and simply utter (speak) to the audience. But in many of the worship centres the 'posed' person use to stand and dance, similar to the possessive activities found in some of the tribal belief systems. This act of 'standing and dancing' is mainly criticised seriously almost universally by Ayyavazhi followers.

Also these types of actions are commonly found in Nizhal Thangals which conduct pujas to Kali and other tribal deities. Since such practices of worshipping other deities are not allowed as per Ayyavazhi theology, the criticism over such possessions are accepted as a standard vision in the Ayyavazhi universe.

=== False deity ===
Though the first form of possession in which the person seated in Padmasana posture is commonly accepted among the followers, this is also criticised by some followers.

Akilathirattu says about a false deity which was sent to the world by Lord Narayana after Vaikundar attained Vaikundam. It also states that this False deity use to say, "I am Vaikundar, I was the one who married the deities and unified into myself." Also this false deity show many magic practices and also many miracles. Some people use to compare the shamanic actions to that of False deity. They cite several quotes from Ayyavazhi scriptures for their criticism. But with a different point of view the supporters of shamanism give different synonymous outputs for the quotes and strengthen their stands.

== See also ==
- Ayyavazhi mythology
- Ayya Vaikundar
- Sampooranathevan
- Ayyavazhi rituals
