= Bala Prajapathi Adikalar =

Indian religious leader

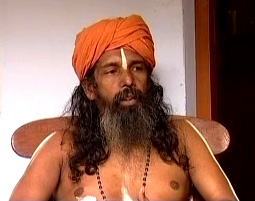
Bala Prajapathi Adikalar, the present Pattathu Ayya of Swamithope pathi.

Bala Prajapathi Adikalar (also spelt Adigalar or Adigal) is a significant religious figure in Ayyavazhi. Ayyavazhi is not an organised religious system, such as Hinduism, and so it does not fall directly under his control officially. But still religiously he was considered so. He has a considerable role in the History of Ayyavazhi, especially during the 1970s and 1980s. He was also awarded the Kottai Ameer award for communal harmony by the government of Tamil Nadu in 2003.

== See also ==
- Kuhar
- Prajapati
