= Ayyavazhi Trinity =

According to the Ayyavazhi religious sect of Hinduism, the Ayyavazhi Trinity is the incarnation of God in the current stage of world development (Kali Yukam). Lord Vaikundar, the Incarnation, is the combination of the Ultimate God, Trimurti and Narayana. In Akilam immediately after the Incarnation of Vaikundar, he was viewed simultaneously as the Ultimate God, Narayana, and as son of Narayana. As per the earlier deed Narayana had to destroy Kaliyan, but due to the boons that kaliyan claimed Narayana has destroy him in form of Pantaram. And as per the promise made by Kaliyan, he would only be destroyed, if he give torture to any Pantaram. To overcome all these, such a unique way of Incarnation was planned.

Akilathirattu narrates that the Avatar (incarnation) of Vaikundar is the combination of Ultimate God, Trimurti and Narayana.

- The Soul (Ekam) - The Soul of Ultimate God (compare with Parameshwara/God-father of Abrahamic religions), Trimurti
- The Avatar of Narayana - Lord Narayana incarnate himself

(Note, that according to Vedic scriptures, Form of Vishnu, inner spirit of Vishnu, and His Holy Names and Lilas are non-different.)

== The Soul ==
The Soul of Vaikundar is that of the Paramatma or the Ultimate God, and it was viewed that the Ultimate God or Ekam (the God beyond Consciousness), incarnates here in the world. The Thiru Nadana Ula which was told by Sivan, which was a part of Akilam states it clearly. "An assemblage was rended by getting a great Assemblage which arose with its own intention and by the rended assemblage there formed a great world of righteousness and by which the kali is destroyed as its age is over." Here the 'great assemblage' (assembled of the whole which exists in a globular shape) represents the Ekam or the Ultimate God which is beyond Consciousness, the 'rended assemblage' represents Vaikundar, and the 'world of righteousness' represents Dharma Yukam. This verse says that Vaikundar was the one by which Dharma Yukam created, and Vaikundar was rended by getting the power of Ekam without which kali would not be destroyed.

Immediately after the ceremony of avatar of Vaikundar, Narayana called Vaikundar "Your self is Sivan, your self is Vethan, your self is Thirumal and your self is the austerity, your self is Brahman and your self is the whole which exists." Vaikundar was also called as Muthalvan, which in Tamil means the one who formed first. Also as per the boons that Kaliyan claimed, Narayana or any other else could not destroy Kaliyan. This is also the reason which paves the way for the soul of the Ultimate Being to come as Vaikundar. During the Katuvai Sothanai, Vaikundar says that, "I am the one who created the Ekam and I am in every thing which exists. Since the trimurti was concealed into my self, myself is the soul of all living beings." Also, in the event of the Marriage of the Deities, Vaikundar unified into himself Sarasvathi, Laksmi, Parvathi, in addition to the 'Goddess of Earth' (Poomadanthai) and by which it was clearly stated that Vaikundar is the incarnation of Ekam, 'The Ultimate', which is beyond all these.

== The Avatar of Narayana ==
The spirit of Narayana was in which the Ultimate soul is installed. So on the other hand Vaikundar was viewed as Narayana, the Murthi Stage (i.e. the God with supreme consciousness). A verse in Akilam states that "The day on which Narayanar came as Vaikundar." Also as soon as the Santror was born (see Santror Pirappu), the Seven Virgins felt that they had lost their purity. They tried to assemble the Ganges (water) into a ball, but cannot. They not even look the face of their sons. They started performing austerity that Narayana who was the one who deceived them should marry them, and rule the world along with them. This was accepted by Thirumal. And for this reason Vaikundar marry the Seven Virgins during his Avatar. This is the part at which Ayya Vikundar is highly focused as Narayana in Akilam.

Also, when Kroni was fragmented into six, Sivan told Narayana, "All the six fragments will take birth as Asuras in each Yukams and you have the responsibility to destroy him by taking birth in world." This is elaborated in Akilam One. Then, Akilam says that in the Dharma Yukam Vaikundar rule the world along with the Seven Virgins and Santror Makkal. Accordingly, it was stated that Vaikundar is Narayana himself incarnate.

Also Vinchai is the part where this view could be ultimately found Vaikundar as a son of Narayana. Both in the First as well as the Muttappathi Vinchais, Vaikundar was called by Narayana with a high fatherly affection. And also Vaikundar called Narayana as Father. In this fact, it is notable that before the incarnation (i.e. before the soul of Ekam and spirit of Narayana installed into the body) Narayana in the sea, called the body as "My dear son", because the body was given birth by Veiyelal in the dynasty of Santror, the children of Narayana.

Vaikundar took the human form as Pantaram at Tharuvaiyur near seashore. From the point of incarnation of Vaikundar, it is said that he will destroy Kaliyan and the evil in Kali Yuga. It is also said that he will take all righteous people along with him in the succeeding eighth yuga called as Dharma yuga.

I (Hari Gopalan) am writing these words of Akilattirattu Ammanai with the grace of God!

"O Lord you took avatar for Pandavas and eliminated their enemies.

You attained the abode of Kailasa with anger due to birth of Kaliyan.

Came again to the world to protect santror (good people) and dharma

On Masi 1008, I (Lord Narayana) myself appeared as Pantaram on the banks of sea, have taken residence in Theksanapuri as Vaikundar

— Akilattirattu

Akilathirattu says, Lord Narayana himself incarnated as Vaikundar and appeared as Pantaram on the banks of sea. This place became a holy place for the devotees of Ayya vazhi and they erected a temple there named Avathara pathi.

== See also ==
- Ayya Vaikundar
- Hinduism
- Trimurti; Brahma, Vishnu, Shiva
- Trinity
