= Kuhar =

Kuhar is a Croatian and Slovenian surname meaning "cook".

In the Central Croatia, it is most common in the Lepoglava area of Hrvatsko zagorje, Samobor area (Rude), Podravina (Koprivnica) and the capital Zagreb. It is mentioned in the 1700s parish records of the Catholic Church in Croatia.

In India and specially States like Haryana, Rajasthan and Uttar Pradesh Kuhar's comes under Jaat or Jatt clan.

Notable people with the surname include:

- Alojzij Kuhar, Slovenian and Yugoslav politician, diplomat, historian, and journalist
- Michael J. Kuhar, American neuroscientist
- Nejc Kuhar, Slovenian ski mountaineer
