= Thamaraikulam, Theni =

Thamaraikulam
- Town
- Nicknames: TKM, Lotus city
- Location in Tamil Nadu, India
- Coordinates: 10°6′26″N 77°33′4″E
- Country: India
- State: Tamil Nadu
- District: Theni
- Talukas: Periyakulam

Population (2001)
  - Total: 10,264

Languages
  - Official: Tamil
- Time zone: UTC+5:30 (IST)
- PIN: 625605
- Telephone code: 04567251607

Thamaraikulam is a panchayat town in Periyakulam taluk of Theni district in the Indian state of Tamil Nadu. Gandhinagar, Bangalapatti, Thamaraikulam, Thasildar nagar these are important wards in this village.

== History ==
The group of people who lived around pudukottai annavasal moved from their place Because of the cruelty of the king of Pudukkottai . Few group of people came to Thamaraikulam, they found this place to be a suitable settlement. So they founded a village in that place, it is later called Thamaraikulam. While creating the village they fixed the boundaries. While they formed the village there were people who belong to 5 different castes Namely, Muslims, Karkarthar, Ambalathaar, Maravar, Pillaimar and PARAIYAR. With passage of time, more people joined the village.

== Demographics ==
As of 2001 India census, Thamaraikulam had a population of 1,264. Males constitute 51% of the population and females 49%. Thamaraikulam has an average literacy rate of 66%, higher than the national average of 59.5%: male literacy is 73%, and female literacy is 59%. In Thamaraikulam, 13% of the population is under 6 years of age.

== Geography ==
The river Bambaru (Snake river) which starts from Kumbakarai falls crosses via Gandhinagar and it joins with river Varaganathi near by Banglapatti. This river fills several ponds and pools including Nandiyapuram, pattathi kulam, pudukulam. This river is the main water source to the farmers of the surrounding areas.

== Employment ==
The main occupation of this village is agriculture, especially mango, paddy, sugar cane, banana, cotton, and coconut. The majority of this village's people are depending upon agricultural sector. Very few countable people are government employees.

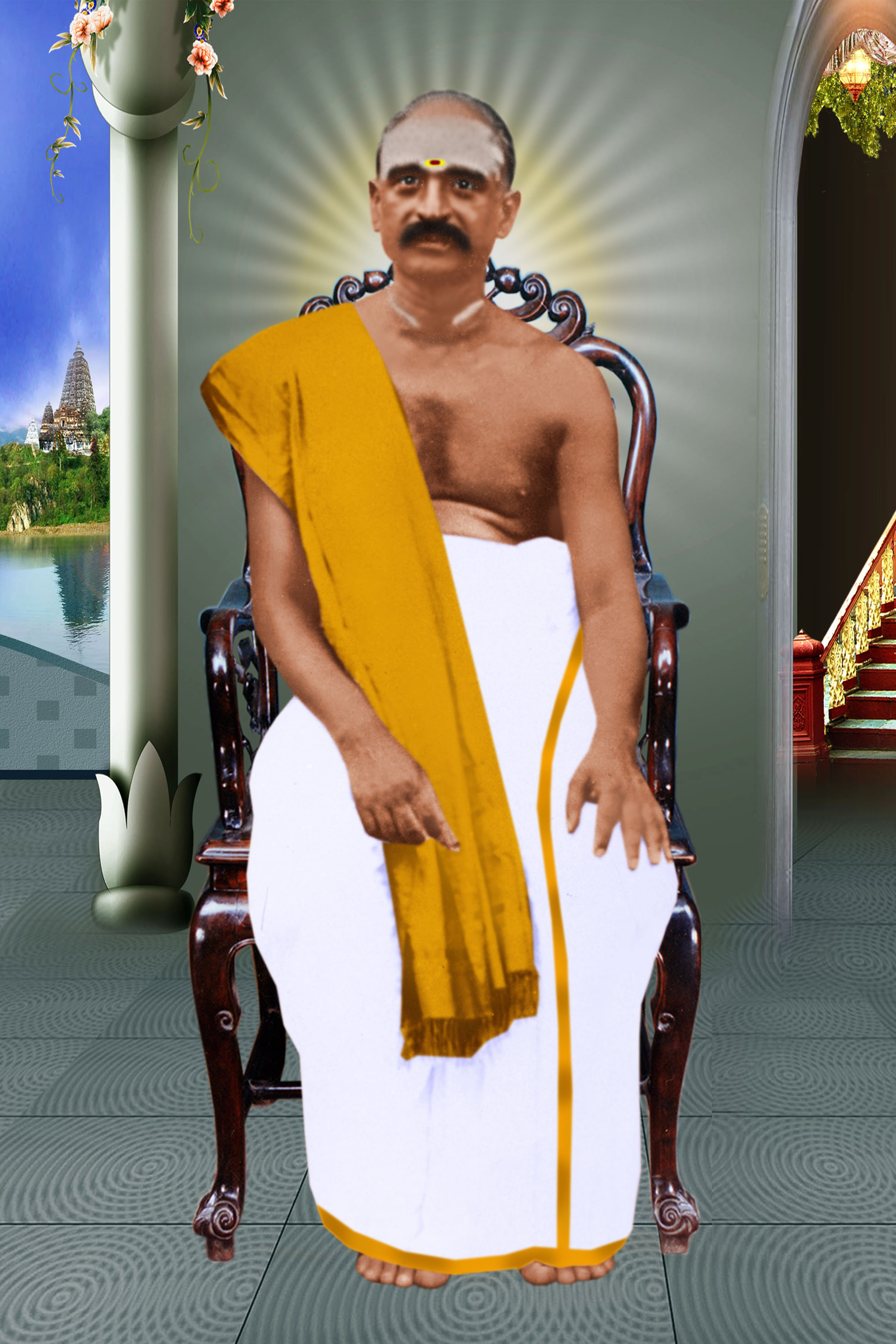
Venkatachalam is the head of Thamaraikulam, Theni District.

== Politics ==
The people of Thamaraikulam pray the goddess "Chellandi Amman". People also give importance to the Karnam Venkatachalam

After Karnam Venkatachalam, his son Thillai Nayagam attained posting as Village Chief. At present Thiru Gnana Sambandham(Son of Thillai Nayagam and Grandson of Karnam Venkatachalam)is the village chief of Thamaraikulam. Village Chief of Thamaraikulam is the hereditary post. Only Karnam Venkatachalam's hereditary can attain this post.

== Festival ==
Village Temple(Chellandi Amman) Festival has been celebrated every year during the Tamil Month of Purataasi in grand manner.

Chellandi Amman Temple Festival 2015:

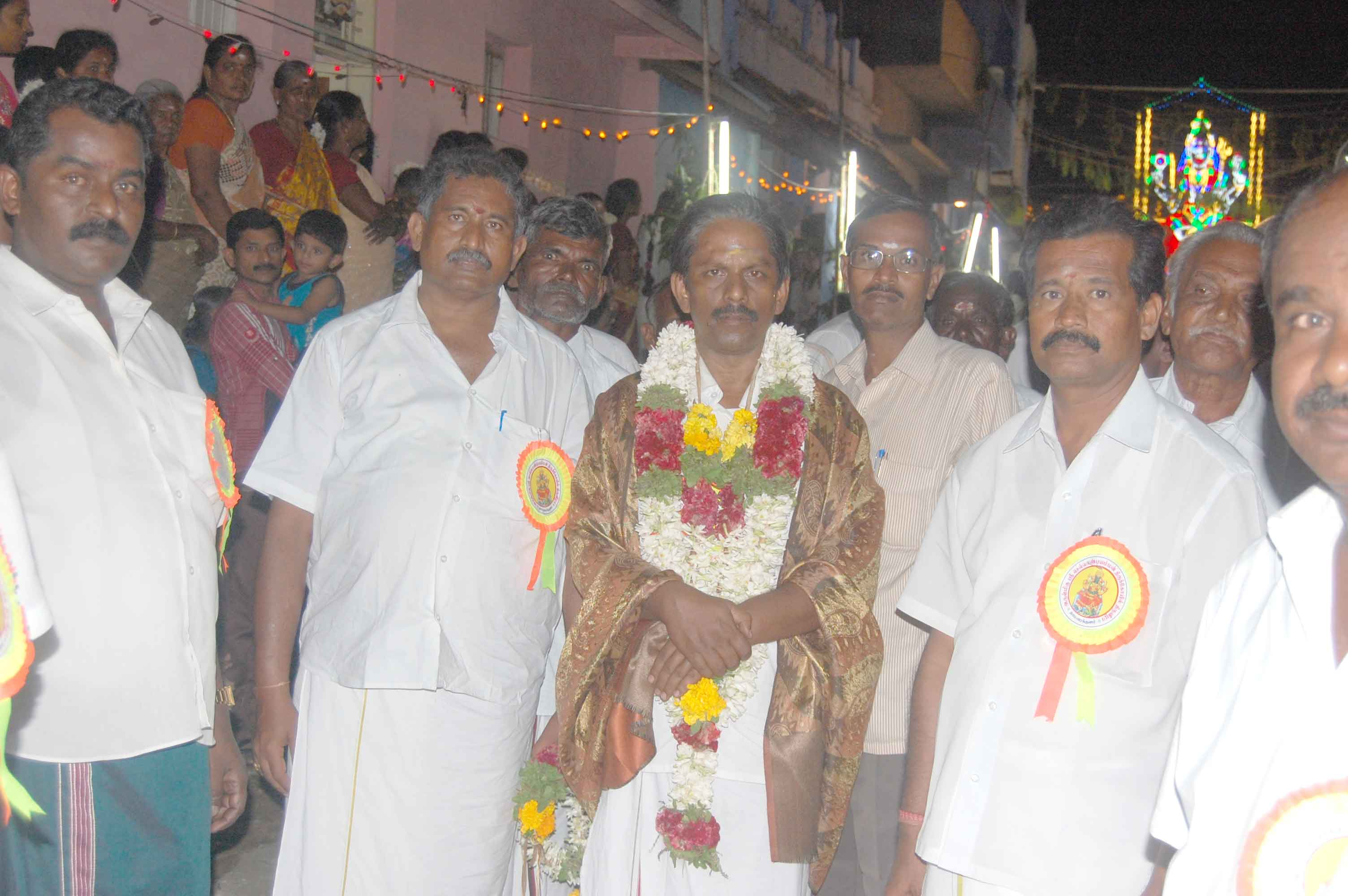
Theni District Thamaraikulam Village Chief landscape photo snap captured during Chellandi Amman Temple festival 2015
