= Palaramachandran version =

First published version of Akilam, the scripture of Ayyavazhi

The Palaramachandran Version was the ever first published version of Akilam, the scripture of Ayyavazhi by Thankaiyah. It was published in 1939 and thus become the second printed work to be published in Ayyavazhi after the Arul Nool. There is another opinion that this version was first published in 1933.

This was released verifying the palm-leaf version of Swamithope. This version includes various sub-sections from the other versions but much more limited in number. But unlike other versions, it will not part the contents to seventeen sections. It was first published as two parts and from the second edition onwards combined and published as a single book. So far, eleven editions have been released, the latest in 2001. Many lines found in the palm leaf versions are omitted throughout all editions making the relationships between them extremely complex.

== See also ==
- Akilattirattu Ammanai
- Sentratisai Ventraperumal version
- Arul Nool
