= Kaliyan =

Mythical figure in Ayyavazhi mythology

Kali (Kaliyan in Tamil) was the sixth fragment of the primordial manifestation of Kroni (evil) according to Akilathirattu, the source of Ayyavazhi mythology and the holy book of Ayyavazhi religion. Unlike other previous manifestations, Kali spread in this yugam (yukam in Tamizh) as maya (illusion). Details of Kali were restated in the Ayyavazhi religion and he is the same Kali mentioned in Kalki Purana.

== Kali Yugam ==
As the time is close to the ascendancy of Kali Yuga, a sage named Guru Muni told Shiva, "Your greatness, the Kroni was created and fragmented into six parts. Five of those parts were made to take birth. However, because none of them obeyed you, all were destroyed by Vishnu(Mayon/Thirumal in Tamizh), and his spirit (the spirit Vishnu took only in the Avatars) was kept in Parvatha Ucchi Malai (In Sanskrit 'uccha' means high, in Tamil 'malai' means mountain). Nonetheless, by the sixth fragment, Kroni still has a birth in Kali Yugam." He also requested that in this yugam his sixth fragment should be created with a body with eight chans (spans - distance from the end of the thumb to the end of the little finger extended). Shiva made a proposal to create Kali, in the following manner.

Accepting Guru Muni's request, Shiva replied, "Good. Didn't Vishnu have to come?" Deva Muni replied, "Vishnu was in his ‘Sleep of Wisdom’ (sleeping) in the world." Hearing this, Shiva assembled the following beings: Vasishta Guru of Govuha(? Needs Sanskrit equivalent), Devas of Deiva Lokam, the members of Vaikunta Lokam Kinneras(Kina nathar in Tamizh), Kimpurusha(Kimburudar in Tamizh), and members from all other worlds. He also assembled all the Deiva Ganas. Then he asked the gathering, Is Vishnu in Vaikuntam? If he is not there, then where is he? The conclave repeated that, Vishnu was dead lying (without any activities) in the lower world (Earth).

Hearing this, Shiva replied, "All the previous five fragments were destroyed since they did not respect us. Now it’s his sixth birth, but, even now, he doesn’t realize that no other chances will be provided and he will be sentenced to death. And so, in this birth, he will be created as a human being with the following talents: aesthetics, wisdom, beauty, and sharp intelligence. In the previous Yugas, Vishnu took a body of four spans and head one span. In this yuga, Kali will be given a body the same size of that of Vishnu in all previous yugas. That way, Kali will have no reason for his defeat to argue that is similar to the previous ones. Does anyone have any opinions or objections about it?" The proposal was accepted unanimously by the Devas, chiranjeevin sages, and the brahmins, those who read scriptures. Therefore, Shiva decided to create Kali.

== Birth of Kali ==
At the very moment Shiva made his decision, Kali formed, as a human male, and pushed himself out of the earth in an inverted form. All of Shiva's advisors were amazed and moved by this sight. All of those who witnessed the creation of Kali went to Sivan and reported it to him. At once, Shiva rise from his seat and started walking to see this wonder. Then Nandhi/Nandheesha(Nantheesurar in Tamizh) came across him and said, "Your greatness, you are the one who can’t wholly be known, even by devas. Why are you here? Can I know the reason?" Sivan replied, "I heard that there is a being, born inverted, against dhanam (rule of the land), whose legs were towards sky and head towards flower (flower here - earth). So I am going there, because I want to see it for myself". Hearing this, Nandhi complained, "Dhanam was overtaken, not there, but here. If something happened, you would normally be on your seat, up in Kayilai, and you would control everything. But now all the procedures are disintegrated. Because you stood up from your seat, the whole world will suffer and the dharmam will dissolve. Warfare and deception will rule the world. The land will lack rainfall. The true scripture, which tells about the Brahmam, will be substantially lost." Because of his complaint, Nandhi, along with Siva, returned to Kailaasham.(Kayilai in Tamizh)

== Nature of Kaliyan ==
After getting back to Kailaasham, Nandhi told Shiva, "We'll call Chithira Buthira (Chithira Buthira in Tamizh) and ask him to describe Kali". This request was honored. Chithra Buthira described Kali thusly: "He was born from the sixth fragment of Kroni. His body was made by assembling earth, sky and fire. The water will be Kali's strength. The vayu (air) will be the prana for him. Kali will be the most cruel one, of all the six fragments." Chithira Buthira also noted that Mayon had taken a 4-span body in the previous yugas, as Narasimha, Rama, and Krishna, and so Kali, in this yuga, was born with the body of same size, and he pushed himself out of the earth.

After hearing this, Shiva asked Chitra Buthira to tell about Kali's lifespan, qualities, and power. Chitra Buthira responded with a narrative. Buthira said, "Because [Kali] was born without the instrumentality of normal human parentage, all the 96 Tatvas in his physique are rude and unrefined. Also, because of his unusual birth, he would have his intelligence and five senses rooted in falsehood. His eyes, legs and head will lead Kali towards sin. His nature is not knowing the true nature of the things here. He will have a life span of about a hundred years, and he will attain maturity at the age of fourteen. He will have about ten hundred thousand drops of semen in his body." (Some sources claim this as 10 lakh drops of blood, not semen). "He will attain full bodily maturity at the age of 31. Kali's body, which was built up with blood, bone, veins and muscle, are made of water and earth, and this is used for nothing (useless). His body will have 9 openings outside. This toy (i.e., body) will be controlled by a bird (i.e., soul), and when it’s time for the bird to go, it will fly away, leaving the toy here, and thereby the bird will have no relation with the toy. This bird and the body is free for him in this yuga. And until the bird is with him, Kali's savageness cannot be tolerated. Since his nature is like this, and since he is built up of savageness, he will not be thankful."

== Kali in Kailasham (Kayilai in Tamizh) ==
Shiva, now even more interested in Kali, wanted to see him, so after a deep discussion, Shiva asked Yama, demons, Durga, and 3 crore (or 30 million) ghosts to bring him to Kailasham. All of them went in front of Kali and told him that, "You are asked by Shiva to come to Kailasham". Kali gave a lackluster response. He rolled over, but still his head was inside the earth and the earth was sticky. He was not able to come out. The sky ignored the going-ons as well. Because of this failure to come out, Kailasham trembled, and the witnesses shivered. So some of the spooked witnesses headed to Kailasham and told Shiva that Kali was unable to come out, and the earth was suffering because of that failure. Shiva made a plan. He asked a kammalan, or craftsman, to make a single fork, and asked Nandhi to carry Kali out, using that fork. This proved successful: Nandhi took the fork, walked towards Kali, and took him out of the earth with the fork. As soon as Kali was out, the resulting opening in the earth promptly shut. All of the parties at the site then pulled Kali to Kailasham and presented him to Shiva.

== Birth of Durukthi (Kalicchi in Tamizh) ==
When Kali was presented to Shiva, Shiva asked Kali, "What would you like to have?". Kali, asking the devas or a third party, said, "Is that fellow ready to give me what I need, because he wears a snake on his neck and ash on his forehead, and because he sits on an elephant skin?" Kali disgraced Shiva with this question, causing the devas to advise Kali, "Don’t disgrace Shiva. He was the one who created the world. He was the one who offered food for every life in the world. He was the light which was not even visible to Mayon and Vethan. (This is an allusion to when Shiva appeared in a form of endless lingam of light when there was a dispute between Mayon and Nathan as to who is the greatest and in order to subdue their pride.) Don't worry, he will be able to give what you claim." Kali replied, "If he was the one who made the world, ask him to create a beautiful girl for me."

As per his request, a lady named Durukthi was created from his left rib-bone. And then Kali understood the power of Sivan.

== Kali Claiming boons ==
Seeing all these, the Devas asked Kali to thank Shiva, and the Devas also asked him to claim the boons (blessings and permissions). Kali accepted this, saying, "Your highness, thank you for creating a lady for me. Would you mind giving me other items I need?" Shiva told, "What do you want?" Since Shiva had agreed to offer Kali boons, he started asking for boons which control the whole Universe. This panicked all of the logas, who shivered on hearing the boons of Kali.

Upon hearing of this fright, Shiva asked Parvathi what to do. She replied, "You must satisfy all of Kali's requests, but the fulfillment should be performed under technique." Shiva provided those boons in a roundabout way: he created a man named Agastya(Agatheesar in tamizh, Agasthyar in Grantha Tamizh) with his mind, so that the boons would be given through that man. Agastya was also created with great knowledge of every subject. Having done this, Shiva ordered the newly made Agastya to give Kali all of the boons that he had claimed. Obeying this, Agastya Rushi offered all the boons to Kali and taught him all of the subjects, including the 'Technique of Living Forever'. Subsequently, Agastya reported those accomplishments to Sivan. Among the boons reportedly given (or sold to) Kali, according to Agastya, were the Chakram and Crown of Vishnu. Agastya concluded in his report, "If all these boons are with [Kali], it is impossible to destroy him."

The boons were:

- The Crown, Chakram and features of Thirumal.
- Sacred ash of Sivan.
- Birth of Brahmins.
- Power, and features of Siva.
- Power and features of Shakti.
- Power of Austerity.
- Power and Features of Nathan.
- Power and features of Lakshmi.
- Power and features of Devas.
- Power and features of Yama.
- Power and features of Virgin Saraswati.
- Power and features of Kali.
- Power and features of Ganesh.
- Power and features of Muruga.
- Power to screen the activities of Ekam.
- Qualities and Features of Prophets.
- Power and Features of the Whole Universe.
- The technique of transferring from one body to another.
- The technique of destroying the world by serious diseases and robbery.
- The technique of making the whole world fall sleep, by which he might fulfill his needs.
- The capability of sensing danger.
- The technique of controlling one's power of speech.
- The technique of separating husband and wife.
- The technique of creating frustration among common people, by which destroying them.
- The technique of killing by practicing magic.
- The technique of arresting the actions of Nature.
- The embryo (from which it forms) of nature.
- The rules and regulations for practicing witchcraft, blackmagic etc.
- The capability of controlling and creating desires.
- The rules and regulations of Puja.
- The rules and regulations of Theetchai.
- The fate of Sivam.
- The technique of floating on water and fire.
- The capability to land on and control the moon.
- The technique of commanding and controlling animals.
- The technique of controlling the planets and astrological phenomena which might disturb him.
- The formula of curing disease (medicine).
- The forms of Trimurti, and the technique of knowing their origin and the formula for commanding them.
- The birth of Devas.
- The formula and technique of flying.
- The formula of commanding various gods.
- The formula of Screening.
- The formula for commanding Thirumal.
- The formula for commanding Shakti.
- The formula for commanding Kali.
- The formula for commanding Devas.
- The formula for knowing the Fate of the future.
- The technique of stopping various exploding weapons, and escaping from them.
- The formula for controlling various venomous beings.

He asked that by these techniques he might live in this world with the dynasty of people born from his semen. And he also asked that all his Five senses should not forget the women (i.e.) his wife Kalicchi.

== Promise of Kali ==
Meanwhile, Vishnu, in the form of an old beggar (Pantaram in Tamizh) on his way to say good-bye to Shiva, met with Kali. Vishnu asked Kali to donate him some of the boons which was given to him. Otherwise, Vishnu threatened, he would overwhelm Kali physically and then proceed with Kali's boons. Kali retorted, "You are an age-old person. Also, you have no army and no sword or any weapons. If I quarrel with you, even the lady on my side will degrade me. So how about this: why not move aside, and leave?". Then Vishnu replied, "Ok, make me a promise [to behave nicely]." Kali asked, "What should I make a promise on?" Vishnu responded, "Promise on your boons, kingdom, your lady, your military and your dynasty." Kali thus declared: "I promise that if I create any troubles to beggars on earth, I, my lady, my boons, my kingdoms, and my military will all fail, my dynasty and I will die, and both my dynasty and I will go to hell." As Kali made his oath, Vishnu got the Chakram from Kali, cursed the Chakram as Money, and gave it back to him. As soon as it was cursed, the chakram asked Vishnu, "When will your curse finish?". Vishnu replied, "It'll be away from you when Kali is defeated." Because Kali now had this new money, Kali told Durukthi, "We now have whatever we need." Kali went to Shiva and asked him to allow him to go to the world. By this point, Vishnu had asked the Devas to write down all the happenings perfectly, and he was already walking towards Vaikuntam.

== Kali entering the world ==
Kali and Durukthi's entrance into the world caused a universal disaster. Upon seeing the two newcomers, all the good animals, birds, reptiles, and even ethics (Neethi in Samskrtham) quit the world. The Animal kingdom started to experience immense torture. A large number of species all departed for Vaikuntam when Kali entered the world: White Elephants, White Lions, White tigers, Five-headed Snakes, White Swans, White Cuckoos, White Doves, White Peacocks, White Cobras, White Wolves, White Garudas, Hanuman, White Crows, White Deers, and Good Rhinoceros. The good Pearls, good Gems, the old Vedas, and good Shastras, also disappeared from the world. The Trishanku (Trichangu in Tamizh) went deep into the sea, along with everything originating in the sea. Gold went into the earth. All the idols of Gods, temples and the sutras (formulas) went into the water and earth. The rain which, up to this point, had fallen three times a month, stopped. Beautiful flowers vanished.

As the wicked Kali came to the world, the ocean waves became angry and washed away many parts of land. All the ethical people went into the forest from the country. There the eldest one among Pancha pandavas, Yudhishthira asked the Dharma Neethi "If all of you have gone away, how can we get to Vaikuntam?". The Darma Neethi replied that the advent of Kali barred the ethical people from reaching Vaikuntam, and thus the Dharma Neethi were going to Vishnu. So the Panchapandavas followed them and headed to Vishnu.

== See also ==
- Boons offered to Kaliyan
- Kalicchi
- Kali (Demon)
