= Ekam =

Sanskrit word for "one, single, solitary"

Ekam is the Sanskrit for "one, single, solitary" (neuter gender), as a noun meaning "unity". In Hinduism, it refers to a concept of monism akin to that of Brahman in Advaita philosophy and Smarta theology.

== Truth is One ==
A well-known statement is, "Truth is one, sages call it by various names." It is derived from Rig Veda Samhita 1.164.46: "They call him Indra, Mitra, Varuna, Agni, and he is heavenly nobly-winged Garutman. To what is One, sages give many a title. They call it Agni, Yama, Matarisvan.". According to William A. Graham, "the one" in verse 1.164.46 refers to Vāc, goddess of speech, appearing as "the creative force and absolute force in the universe." In later Vedic literature, "Speech or utterance is also identified with the supreme power or transcendent reality," and "equated with Brahman in this sense." Frauwallner states that "many gods are traced back to the one Godhead. The one (ekam) is not meant adjectively as a quality but as a substantive, as the upholding centre of reality."

== Ayyavazhi ==
Ekam (Tamil: ஏகம், "the supreme oneness") is the term used in Akilathirattu Ammanai, the holy book of the religion of Ayyavazhi, to represent The Ultimate Oneness. In Thiruvasakam-2 it was stated that it was from this Ekam that all objects, including the separate Godheads, Devas and asuras, of the universe formed. As per Akilam, this state of ekam is beyond the consciousness and derived to beyond the state of changing and is the extreme state in which the whole universe exists.

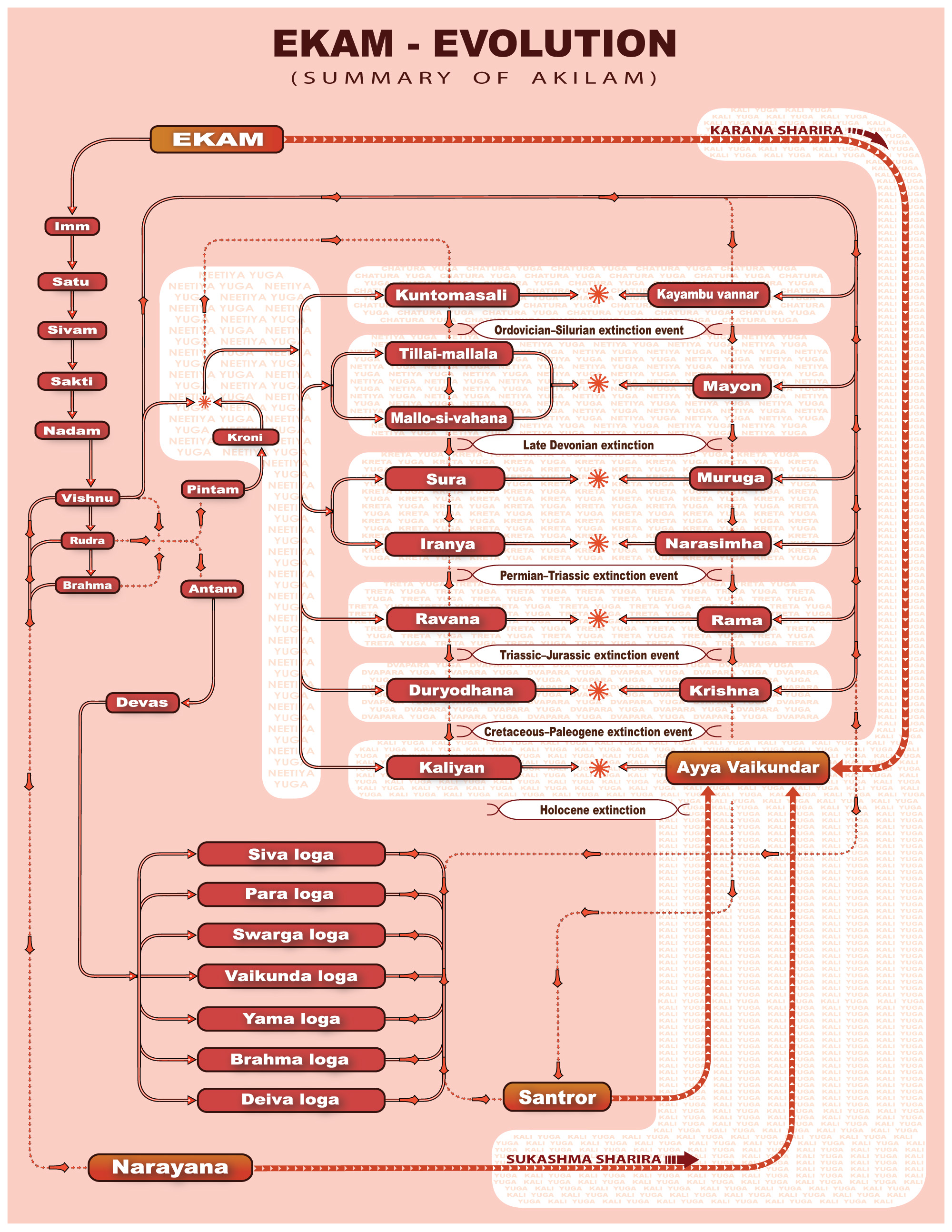
Evolution of Ekam, the source of whole existence as described in Akilam

In Saivism, Ekam is used commonly to refer to the oneness of God, but in Ayyavazhi the basic oneness is separately symbolized to be supreme and ultimate beyond all God-heads and powers. The derivations of Ekam in Ayyavazhi scriptures are sometimes close to the pantheistic form of theology. In the mythology of Ayyavazhi, God-heads such as Siva and Vishnu are said to be the godheads who have power to rule this Ekam, varying from time to time, Siva until Kali Yuga and Vishnu from the starting of Kali Yuga. There are separate quotes in Akilam for focusing Siva as well as Vishnu in charge of this position. But, still the Ekam is addressed beyond these god-heads.

But when Vaikundar is jailed in Singarathoppe, he says, "I am the one who created the Ekam and the one who is omnipresent everywhere". By this, the theology reveals Vaikundar (God) as beyond the attributes of Ekam, which moves the theology of Ayyavazhi more towards pantheism.

== See also ==
- Ayyavazhi Trinity
- Nasadiya Sukta
- Waḥdat al-Wujūd in Islam

== Sources ==
- Frauwallner, Erich (1973), History of Indian Philosophy: The philosophy of the Veda and of the epic. The Buddha and the Jina. The Sāmkhya and the classical Yoga-system, Motilall Banarsidas
- Akilathirattu Ammanai Parayana Urai by A. Arisundara Mani, 2002.
- Sri Vaikunda Swamigal and the Struggle for Social Equality in South India by R. Ponnu, 2000.
