= Dharma Yukam =

Heaven in Ayyavazhi mythology

Dharma Yukam is the state of absolute bliss as per Ayyavazhi mythology. Dharma Yukam is described in the Akilam seventeen in Akilathirattu Ammanai. It is related to Dharmic moksha and to Abrahamic heaven.

== Vaikundar on throne ==
As soon as Vaikundar attained Vaikundam, he was welcomed by Devas and Narayana. Then the Kalai Muni and the Gnana Muni who witnessed the activities of Vaikundar while accompanying him narrated the events. Vaikundar was crowned by Narayana as the king to rule the fourteen worlds (lokas). Then as per Narayana they carried Vaikundar in a 'Ratha' around the Vaikunda Loga playing drums and music. They brought Vaikundar along with the Devas and the Munis in front of Narayana.

Narayana proclaimed that Vaikundar is the head of Vaikundam hereafter. Then he ordered the Devas to go to Kailash and engrave on Mount Meru that, "As per the holy Agama Vaikundar is going to rule the whole worlds from today onwards." Narayana Crowned Vaikundar and gave him sovereign authority and other divine paraphernalia. Narayana, Siva and other Devas seated him on the throne.

== Plea ==
Lord Vaikundar pleaded to Narayana for the uplift of his people, The Santror. Narayana replied that they would be saved from the evil of Kali and Kali Yuga and would achieve bliss and prosperity in the Dharma Yukam. Until then he asked Vaikundar to adopt austerity on the throne. He stated that test the faith of the people towards him (Vaikundar), a 'false deity' would claim to be god and could perform many miracles. Afterwards, the yuga will be destroyed and the people will be saved and will be given an eternal life of bliss.

== Destruction of Kali Yuga ==
Lord Vaikundar realised that good people are those who suffer most while those with evil thoughts lead a happy life. He refers to the Agamas to know the time limits of this. He decided to destroy the Kali-yuga. Immediately. As Vaikundar thought of this destruction, nature started to respond, burning unwanted things and beings. The whole universe got excited due to this event.

Then Vaikundar thought of creating good things. Immediately good beings such as 'good people', 'good animals', 'good birds', 'good reptiles' and 'good plants' appeared. He ordered the ocean to wash out the bad things immediately.

== Judgement to Kroni ==
Kroni was brought before Vaikundar and he recounted the events that took place right from his birth. He repeated the promise once he (as Kaliyan) made that, "If I tend to torture any Pandaram, I and all my means will go to hell". Kroni had nothing to say and surrendered all his powers and boons. The force of illusion took hold of him and put him into the flames of the abyss where the devils resided. Then the evil force along with him went into hell.

Then Vaikundar blew the conch announcing the victory. Hearing the sound all that signaled Dharma Yukam - "the virtue, the Sastras, the plants and trees, the reptiles and the birds, the divine women and their children" - all gathered around Vaikundar. He blessed them and instructed them to live fearlessly. He enjoined upon them to assemble in one place, to drink from the same well, and live happily as per the values of Dharma.

== See also ==
- Akilathirattu Ammanai
- Ayya Vaikundar
- Ayyavazhi mythology
- Satya Yuga, the corresponding concept in Hinduism
