= Boothapandi =

- Town
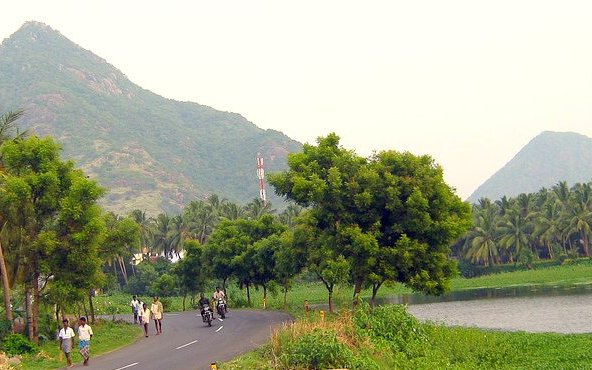
- Boothapandi, Nagercoil
- Nickname: Bhoothai
- Boothapandi, Tamil Nadu
- Coordinates: 8.264100°N 77.445800°E
- Country: India
- State: Tamil Nadu
- District: Kanniyakumari
- Founder: Bhoothapandiyan
- Named for: Bhoothalingaswamy temple

Government
  - Type: Town panchayat
- Elevation: 55 m (180 ft)

Population (2001)
  - Total: 14,721

Tamil
  - Official: Tamil
- Time zone: UTC+5:30 (IST)
- Vehicle registration: TN-74

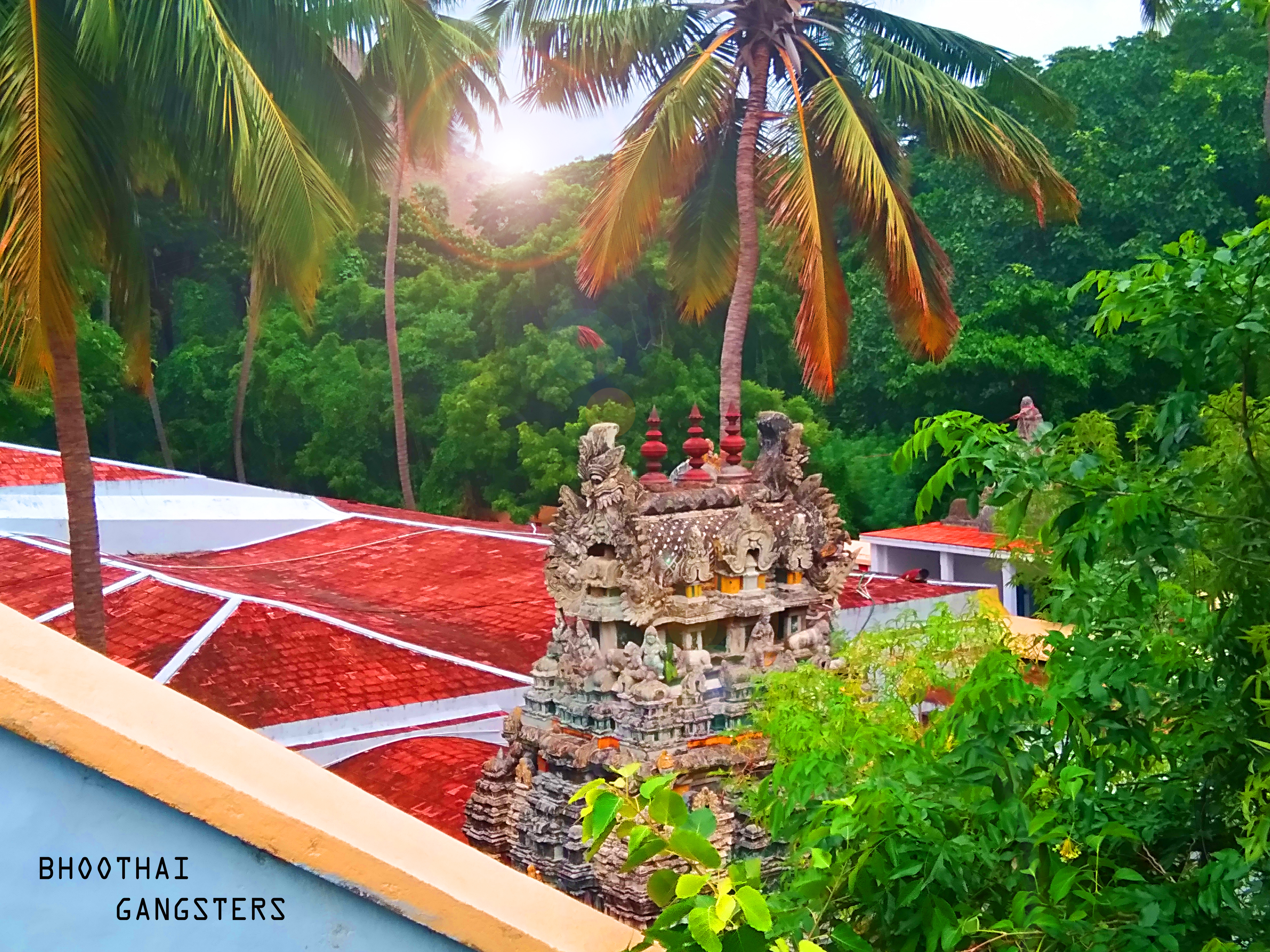

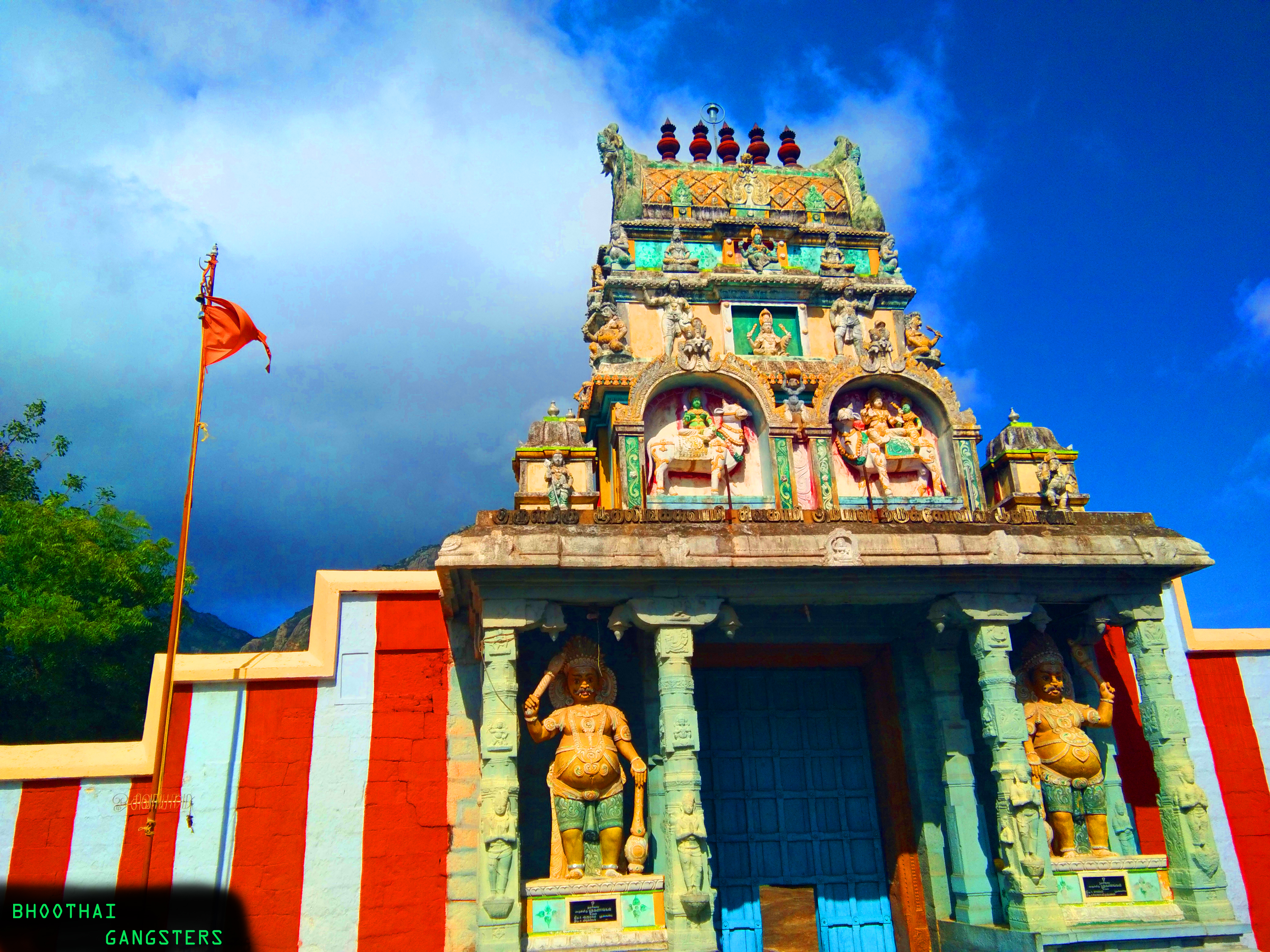

Boothapandi (also known as Boothapandy) is a panchayat town in Kanyakumari district in the state of Tamil Nadu, India.

The town spans an area of around 5 km^{2} with Thittuvilai, Thuvarancaud, Arasankuzhi, Andithoppu, Mannadi, Saattupudoor, Seethapal and Manathittai as its sub-villages. The places situated in the vicinity of the town include Azhagiapandiapuram to the northwest, Esanthimangalam to the southwest, Thalakudi to the southeast and Aralvaimozhi to the east.

It is the headquarters of Thovalai taluk, one of the four taluks of Kanyakumari district. The village has a sub-register office, taluk office, police station, higher secondary school and court.

It was named after the presence of the Bhoothalingaswamy Temple (Bhoothapandi), which is famous for its sculptures and architecture. The surrounding area is green and fertile. The town lies about 11 kilometres (7 miles) north of Nagercoil and its views of the Western Ghats attract many tourists and photographers.

== History ==
Boothapandi was a part of Travancore kingdom before the independence of India. The Bhoothappandi panchayat was formed on 1936. It was one among the 4 Panchayats sanctioned by Sir C.P.Ramaswamy Iyer (Diwan -Thiruvithancore). The others were Paravur, Nedumangadu and Perumbavoor.

== Demographics ==
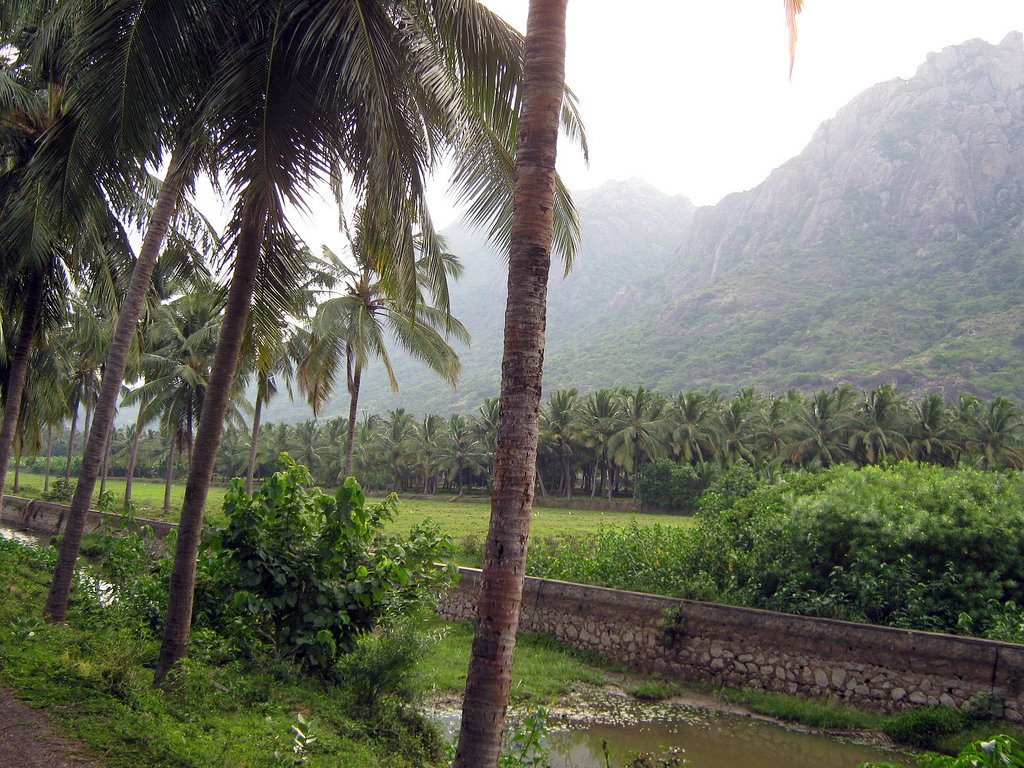
Bhoothapandy Village, Nagercoil

As of 2001 India census, Boothapandi had a population of 14,721. Males constitute 50% of the population and females 50%. Boothapandi has an average literacy rate of 82%, higher than the national average of 59.5%; with male literacy of 84% and female literacy of 79%. 9% of the population is under 6 years of age.

== Notable natives ==
- P Jeevanandham, a socialist and Tamil social reformer.
- B. A. Chidambaranath, a popular musician who was a music director of Malayalam and Tamil films, was also a native of this town.

== See also ==
- Bhoothalingaswamy Temple (Bhoothapandi)
- South Paravoor
- Kollam
- Putheri
