= Marthal =

- village
- Location in Tamil Nadu, India
- Coordinates: 8.27394°N 77.43765°E
- Country: India
- State: Tamil Nadu

Languages
  - Official: Tamil
- Time zone: UTC+5:30 (IST)

Marthal is a village in Tamil Nadu, India. It is 10 km (6.2 mi) from Nagercoil.

It used to be named Marthanda Nallur. There are Hindu temples and a graveyard. St. Francis Assisi Matriculation is a high school located in Marthal. It is surrounded by ponds and green paddy fields. Nearby is the small town of Thittuvilai. More than 50% of the people are Muslims. Christianity is represented by the Catholic St Assisi Church and the Protestant Church of South India.

Devadhas Nadar was once the owner of the majority of lands round about. His descendants subsequently lost power and wealth, but still live close to the village. P. Jeevanandham, a communist leader, was born in the nearby town of Boothapandi.

The Mukkadal Dam is nearby.
