= Erachakulam =

- Neighbourhood
- Erachakulam, Kanyakumari (Tamil Nadu)
- Coordinates: 8.229100°N 77.430600°E
- Country: India
- State: Tamil Nadu
- Elevation: 55 m (180 ft)

Languages
  - Official: Tamil, English
  - Speech: Tamil, English
- Time zone: UTC+5:30 (IST)
- PIN: 629902
- Telephone Code: +914652xxxxxx
- Vehicle registration: TN-74 yy xxxx
- Neighbourhoods: Nagercoil, Boothapandi, Vadasery, Putheri, Thiruppathisaram and Thovalai
- Corporation: Nagercoil Municipal Corporation
- LS: Kanniyakumari Lok Sabha constituency
- MP: Vijay Vasanth
- Website: https://kanniyakumari.nic.in

Erachakulam is a village near Nagercoil in Kanyakumari district of Tamil Nadu state in India.

Erachakulam is located at an altitude of about 55 m above the mean sea level with the geographical coordinates of 8.229100°N 77.430600°E (i.e., 8°13'44.8"N, 77°25'50.2"E). Nagercoil, Boothapandi, Vadasery, Putheri, Thiruppathisaram and Thovalai are some of the nearby towns of Erachakulam.

Amrita Vishwa Vidyapeetham university established its campus in Erachakulam in 2024 by acquiring Amrita College of Engineering & Technology college campus. Government high school is located in Erachakulam.

Sandhana Mariamman Temple located in Erachakulam is under the control of Hindu Religious and Charitable Endowments Department, Government of Tamil Nadu. Udhaya Marthandeswarar Temple, Muppidathiamman Temple and Azhagiya Mannarsamy Temple are also famous temples situated in Erachakulam.

Erachakulam area falls under the Kanniyakumari Lok Sabha constituency.
