= List of colleges in Kanyakumari district =

Kanyakumari ranks first in literacy among the districts of Tamil Nadu. The district has many educational institutions. The following are lists of colleges in the district of Kanyakumari.

== Engineering ==
SL. No.	TNEA Code No.	College name	Address
1	4944	Arunachala College of Engineering for Women	Thanka Gardens, Manavilai, Vellichanthai, Nagercoil, Kanyakumari(Dt.), Pin - 629203
2	4023	University College of Engineering, Nagercoil	Nagercoil Industrial Estate, Konam, Kanyakumari(Dt.), Pin - 629004
3	4670	Rohini College of Engineering & Technology	Anjugramam-kanyakumari mainroad, Palkulam, Variyoor (PO), Kanyakumari(Dt.), Pin -629401
4	4671	Sigma College of Architecture	Moododu, Anducode Post(Near Marthandam), Kanyakumari(Dt.), Pin - 629168
5	4672	Stella Mary's College of Engineering	Aruthengan Vilai, Kallukatti Junction, Kanyakumari(Dt.), Pin - 629202
6	4677	Lourdes Mount College of Engineering and Technology	Marthandam-Karingal Road, Chundavilai, Mullanganavilai, Kanyakumari(Dt.), Pin - 629195
7	4685	Narayanaguru Siddhartha College of Engineering	Athencode, Padanthalumoodu, Near Kaliyakkavilai, Kanyakumari(Dt.), Pin - 629194
8	4927	Maria College of Engineering and Technology	Attoor, Thiruvattar, Kalkulam(Tk.), Kanyakumari(Dt.), Pin - 629177
9	4928	Mar Ephraem College of Engineering and Technology	Malankara Hills, Elavuvilai, Marthandam, Kanyakumari(Dt.), Pin - 629171
10	4929	M.E.T Engineering College	No:13/142A 9/9, Mogals Garden, Chenbagaramanputhoor, Kanyakumari(Dt.), Pin - 629304
11	4932	Immanuel Arasar J J College of Engineering	Edavilagam, Nattalam, Marthandam, Kanyakumari(Dt.), Pin - 629165
12	4938	Sivaji College of Engineering and Technology	Manivila, Palukal, Kanyakumari(Dt.), Pin - 629170
13	4943	Satyam College of Engineering and Technology	Satyam Nagar, Aralvoimozhy, Thovalai(Tk.), Kanyakumari(Dt.), Pin - 629301
14	4945	Vins Christian Women's College of Engineering	VINS Nagar, Chunkankadai, Villukuri, Kanyakumari(Dt.), Pin - 629807
15	4946	DMI Engineering College	Kumarapuram Road, Aralvoimozhi, Thovalai, Kanyakumari(Dt.), Pin - 629301
16	4948	Rajas International Institute of Technology for Women	Ozhuginasery, Nagercoil, Kanyakumari(Dt.), Pin - 629001
17	4950	Tamizhan College of Engineering and Technology	Tamizhan Nagar, Chenbagaramanputhur, Thovalai, Kanyakumari(Dt.), Pin - 629304
18	4952	CSI Institute of Technology	Chenbagaramanputhoor, Thovalai, Kanyakumari(Dt.), Pin - 629302
19	4956	Jayamatha Engineering College	Thirurajapuram, Muppandal, Aralvaimozhi, Kanyakumari(Dt.), Pin - 629301
20	4971	St.Xavier's Catholic College of Engineering	NH-47, Chunkankadai, Nagercoil, Kanyakumari(Dt.), Pin - 629003
21	4972	Amrita College of Engineering & Technology	Amritagiri, Erachakulam, Kanyakumari(Dt.), Pin - 629901
22	4977	Narayanaguru College of Engineering	Manjalumoodu, Arumanai, Vilavancode(Tk.), Kanyakumari(Dt.), Pin - 629151
23	4978	Udaya School of Engineering	Udaya Nagar, Vellamadi, Ammandivilai Post, Kalkulam(Tk.), Kanyakumari(Dt.), Pin - 629204
24	4981	Ponjesly College of Engineering	Near Parvathipuram, Veturnimadam Post, Nagercoil, Kanyakumari(Dt.), Pin - 629003
25	4982	Vins Christian College of Engineering	Vins Nager, Chunkankadai, Nagercoil, Kanyakumari(Dt.), Pin - 629807
26	4983	Lord Jegannath College of Engineering and Technology	Ramanathichanputhur, Kumarapuram, Thoppur, Kanyakumari(Dt.), Pin - 629402
27	4984	Marthandam College of Engineering and Technology	P.M. Village Road, Kuttakuzhi, Kanyakumari(Dt.), Pin - 629177
28	4985	K N S K College of Engineering	PCP Nagar, Thirupathisaram Post, Therekalputhoor, Nagercoil, Kanyakumari(Dt.), Pin - 629901
29	4987	James College of Engineering and Technology	Jamespuram, Navalcaud, Esanthimangalam, Near Nagercoil, Kanyakumari(Dt.), Pin - 629852
30	4992	Bethlahem Institute of Engineering	Nadutheri, Karungal, Vilavancode(Tk.), Kanyakumari(Dt.), Pin - 629157
31	4993	Loyola Institute of Technology and Science	Loyola Nagar, Thovalai, Theroor(Vil), Kanyakumari(Dt.), Pin - 629302
32	4999	Annai Vailankanni College of Engineering	Pothaiyadisalai, Pottalkulam, Azhagappapuram, Kanyakumari(Dt.), Pin - 629401
33	0000	IISTM Safety Institution, [ International Institute of Safety and Technical Management ] Nagercoil	Near Nagercoil Park, 3rd Floor Bright Complex, Opp Veppamoodu Bus Stop, Nagercoil, www.iistm.com, ph: 8667644635, Ph: 9487896147, Kanyakumari(Dt.), Pin - 629001

== Arts and science ==
Sl no	Name of college	Institution locality
1	Holy Cross College	Nagercoil, Kanniyakumari
2	Arunachala Arts and Science College for Women	Vellichanthai, Nagercoil
3	Annai Velankanni College	Tholayavattam
4	Arignar Anna College	Aralvaimozhi
5	Government Arts & Science College	Konam, Nagercoil
6	Infant Jesus College of Arts & Science for Women	Mulagumoodu
7	Kalaivanar N S K Arts & Science College	Kumarathope, Kozhikottupothai
8	Lekshmipuram College of Arts & Science	Neyyoor
9	Malankara Catholic College	Mariagiri, Kaliakkavilai
10	Muslim Arts College	Thiruvithancode
11	Nanjil Catholic College of Arts & Science	Nedumcode, Kaliakkavilai
12	Nesamony Memorial Christian College	Marthandam
13	Noorul Islam College of Arts and Science	Kumaracoil, Thuckalay
14	Pioneer Kumarasamy College	Vetturnimadam, Nagercoil
15	Ruben College of Arts & Science	Thadikkarankonam
16	Scott Christian College	Nagercoil
17	Sree Ayyappa College for Women	Ayyappanagar, Chunkankadai
18	Sree Devi Kumari Women's College	Kuzhithurai
19	S.T.Hindu College	Nagercoil
20	St. Alphonsa College of Arts & Science	Soosaipuram, Karinkal
21	St.Jude's College	Thoothoor
22	St. John's College of Arts & Science	Ammandivilai
23	St. Jerome's College	Asaripallam Road (via) Ananthanadarkudy
24	St. Teresa Arts & Science College for Women	Mangalakuntu
25	Sivanthi Aditanar College	Pillayarpuram, Nagercoil
26	Udaya College of Arts & Science	Vellamadi
27	Vivekananda College	Agasteeswaram
28	V.T.M College of Arts and Science	Arumanai
29	Women's Christian College	Nagercoil

== Medical ==
Sl.No	College Name	Course Name	Affiliated University	Institution Locality
MEDICAL COLLEGE (MBBS)
1	Kanyakumari Government Medical College and Hospital	MBBS		Government Medical College, Aasaarippallam Phone No -(04652)-223201,223202
2	Sri Mookambika Medical College	MBBS		Sri Mookambika Medical College Padanilam, Kulasekharam Phone No - (04651)-280745
DENTAL MEDICAL COLLEGES (BDS)
1	Sri Mookambika Dental Medical College	BDS		Sri Mookambika Dental Medical College, Padanilam, Kulasekharam Phone No - (04651)-280745
2	Sardar College of dental	BDS		SA Raja dental College, Kavalkinaru Junction
SIDDHA MEDICAL COLLEGE (BSMS)
1	A.T.S.V.S.Siddha Medical College	BSMS		A.T.S.V.S.Siddha Medical College Munchirai, Puthukadai Phone No - (04651)-235355, 23535, 235476
2	Suchithhran Siddha Medical College	BSMS		Suchithhran Siddha Medical College Makcode, Kaliyakkavillai Phone No (04651)- 244232,244227
HOMEO COLLEGE (BHMS)
1	White Momorial Homeo College	BHMS		White Momorial Homeo College Attoor Phone No (04651)-282292
2	Saratha Krishna Homeo College	BHMS		Saratha Krishna Homeo College Convent Junction, Kulasekharam Phone No (04651)-277448
3	Maria Homoeopathic Medical College and Hospital	BHMS		Perai, Thiruvattar - 629177
NURSING COLLEGES(B.Sc.,/M.Sc.,)
1	C.S.I Nursing College	Bsc 4 yrs		Neyyoor
COLLEGE OF PHARMACY (D.PHARM. / B.PHARM)
1	N.M.S. College of Pharmacy	D.Pharm. / B.Pharm		Mathar Thiruvattar-629177
COLLEGE OF PHYSIOTHERAPY (BPT)
1	Christian College of Physiotherapy	BPT		Colachel- 629251 Phone Number : +91-4561-2527774
2	White Memorial College of Physiotherapy	BPT		Attoor Veeyannor (P.O) 629 177

== Siddha and homeopathy ==
A.D.S.V.S.Siddha Medical College
Address	A.D.S.V.S.Siddha Medical College Munchirai, Puthkkadai
Phone No	(04651)-235355, 23535, 235476
Suchithhran Siddha Medical College
Address	Suchithhran Siddha Medical College Makcode, Kaliyakkavillai
Phone No	(04651)- 244232,244227
White Momorial Homeo College
Address	White Momorial Homeo College Attoor
Phone No	(04651)-282292
Saratha Krishna Homeo College
Address	Saratha Krishna Homeo College Convent Junction, Kulasekharam
Phone No	(04651)-277448

== Polytechnic & ITI ==
Govt.Polytechnic College	Govt.Polytechnic College, Konam, Nagercoil - PH - (04652)-260448
Rohini College of Polytechnic & Engineering	Rohini College of Engineering & Technology, Paulkulam, Kanyakumari - PH - +91 8531088888
Crescent Community College	Crescent Community College K.R Puram, Kanjampuram Post. 629154 PH - (04651)-243730,242730 website - www.crescent.ac.in
Noorul Islam Polytechnic College	Noorul Islam Polytechnic College, Thiruvithancode-629 174 PH - (04651)-248329,248359,248829,248479
Vins Institute Of Aluminium Technology	Vins Institute Of Aluminium Technology, 113, M.S.A. Complex, Chettikulam Jn, Nagercoil-2, PH - (04652)-225332
Udhya Polytechnic College	Udhya Polytechnic College, Udhya Nagar, Esaththanku, Azhikkaal-629 202 PH - (04651)-239910
Sun Polytechnic College	Sun Nagar, Erachakulam -629 902 PH - (04651)-281461
Nadar Mahajana Sangam Kamaraj Polytechnic	Nadar Mahajana Sangam Kamaraj Polytechnic College, Pazhavillai-629 501
Kalaivanar N.S.K. Polytechnic College	V.O.C.Nagar, Chennaramnputhur- 629 304 PH - (04652)-226100,226200
Moderator Ganadhasan Polytechnic College	Moderator Ganadhasan Polytechnic College PH - (04652)-230859
Sri Krishna Polytechnic College	Thuvaraga, Kaliancaud, Nagercoil-629 003 PH - (04652)-232741,221158
Nirmala I.T.I	Manalikarai-629 164, PH - (04651)-289268
Masters Institute Of Film Technology	Duthe School Junction, Nagercoil - 629 001 PH - (04652),420662
Sakthi Vinyagar I.T.I	Lekshmipuram, Kottaram, 629 703 PH - (04652)-271237
Neythal Community College	382, Joe Daniel Street, Nagercoil - 629 003 PH - (04652)-220388
Friends Industrial Training Institute	Mathikcode, Thikanaagcode-629 804
The Salvation Army I.T.I	VTC Compound, Aralvaimozhi, PH-94435 07282
Kaniyakumari Diocese C.S.I. I.T.I	Kaliyakkavillaii-629 153 PH - (04651)-244252
Pioneer I.T.I	1, Dennisen Road, Nagercoil
Nobel HeavyMachinery's & Industrial School	1320, K.P.Road, Nagercoil
Sadhya Industrial Training Institute	Vettuvenni, MainRoad, Marthandam PH - (04651)-271018,273860
Micro I.T.I	Near Eagle Gate, Court Road, Nagercoil PH - (04652)-220642
C.S.I. KanyaKumari Diocese Motor Mechanic Drining Center I.T.I	16, Dennisen Road, Nagercoil- 629 001
New Technical Institute Of Engineering	126, Water Tank Road, Nagercoil- 629 001 PH - (04652)-232901
Matha I.T.I	Kazhuvanthittai, East Kuzhithurai-629 168 PH - (04651)-261251
IISTM Safety Institution,[ International Institute of Safety and Technical Management ] Nagercoil	Near Nagercoil Park, 3rd Floor Bright Complex, Veppamoodu Bus Stop, Nagercoil PH - 8667644635, Ph: 9487896147, www.iistm.com
National I.T.I	Opposite Scout Christian College, Nagercoil -3 PH - (04652)-229835
Jeeva I.T.C	Chenbaramanputhur, PH - (04652)-263555
Morning Star Polytechnic College	Chunkankadai, PH - 9489909662, PH - (04651)-230244
