= Ulakkai Aruvi Waterfalls =

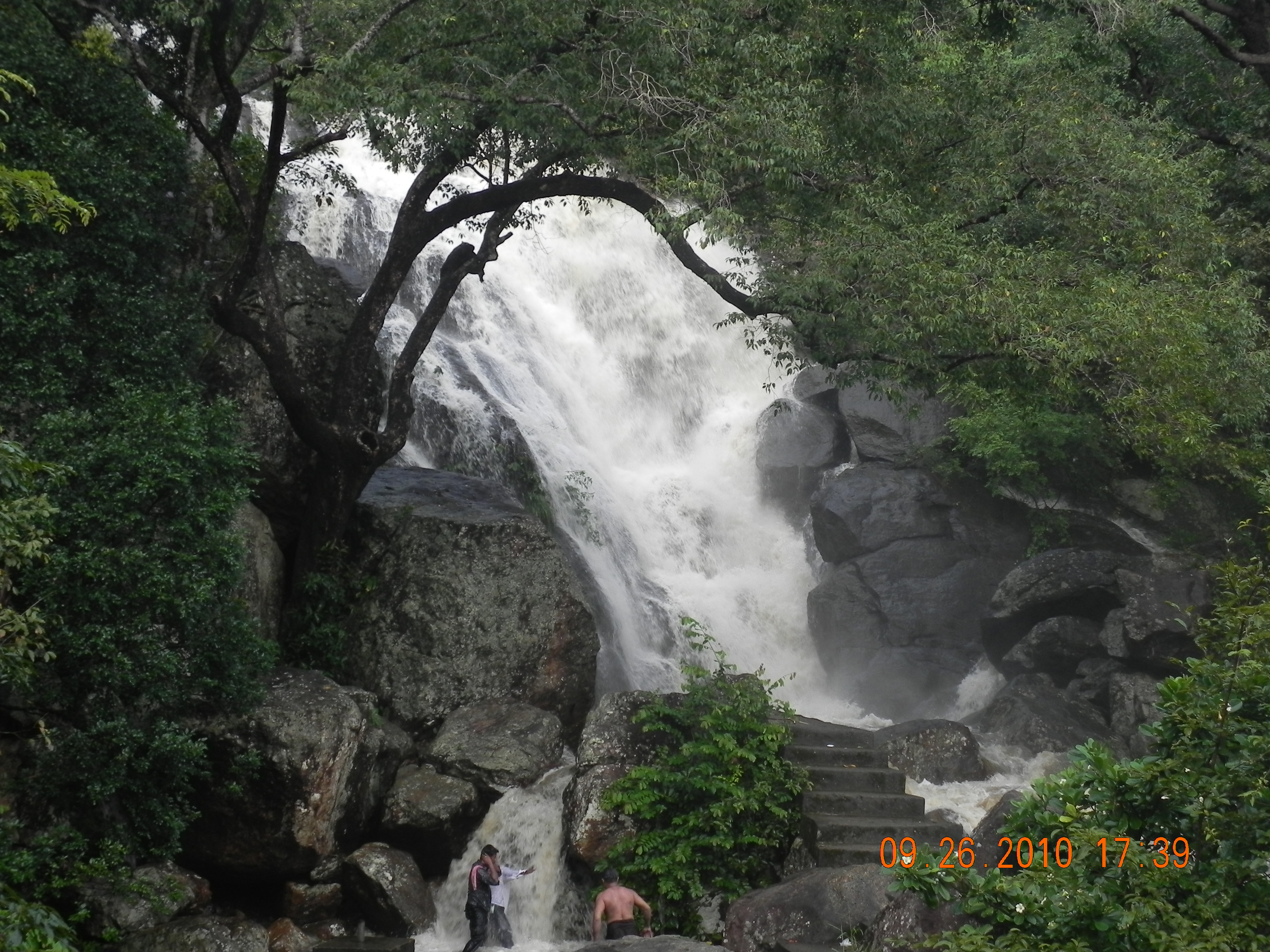
- Location: Nagercoil, Tamil Nadu
- Total height: 54.6 m (179 ft)

Ulakkai Aruvi Falls (also referred to as Rod Falls) is a waterfall in the Western Ghats. It lies in the Asambu Reserve Forest region, in Kanyakumari District, Tamil Nadu, India.

== Geography ==
Ulakkai Aruvi Falls is located near Azhagiapandiapuram, which is about 39 km (24 mi) from Kanyakumari and about 19 km (12 mi) from Nagercoil. Situated in the forested hills of the Western Ghats, the falls can be reached by an hour-long trek from the base of the hills through a rocky, forested area. The Ulakkai Aruvi Falls consists of two separate waterfalls, one low & one high. The falls are fed by the Ulakkai, a spring originating from the nearby Anaimalai Hills.

== Accessibility ==
The nearest road can be found in the village of Perunthalaikadu, with bus services available from Nagercoil to Azhagiapandipuram. From thereon, the falls are accessible only by foot, via a 2 km trek. Most visitors arrive after the monsoon season as the waterfall has more water at that time.

== See also ==
- List of waterfalls
- List of waterfalls in India
