= Azhagiapandiapuram =

Neighbourhood in Kanyakumari district, Tamil Nadu, India

Azhagiapandiapuram Athiyanur
- Village
- Azhagiapandiapuram
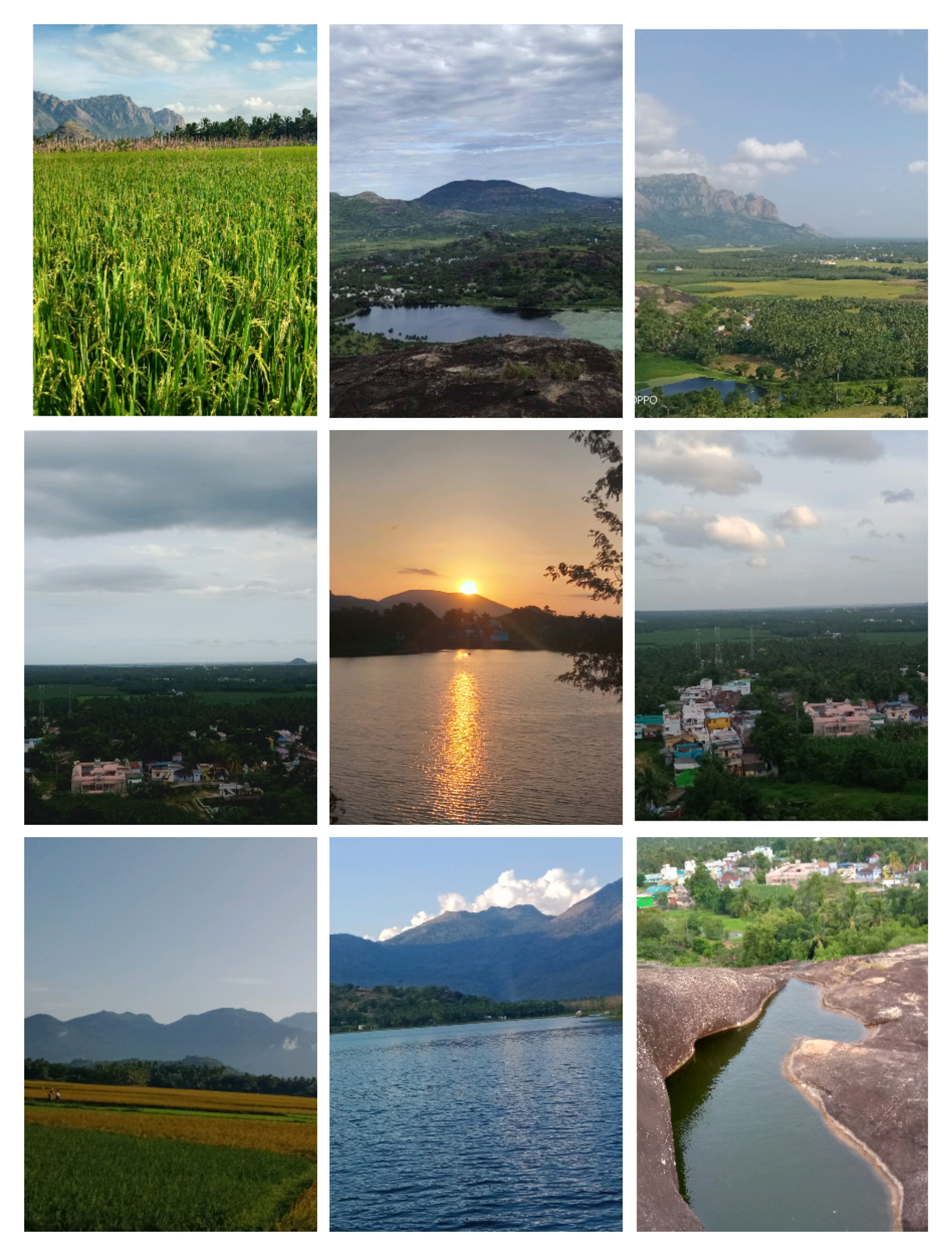
- Nature of Azhagiapandiapuram
- Nickname: Azhagai
- Motto: Satyameva Jayate
- Anthem: Jana gana Mana
- Azhagiyapandipuram, Tamil Nadu
- Coordinates: 8.308100°N 77.438600°E
- Country: India
- State: Tamil Nadu
- District: Kanniyakumari
- Revenue division: Nagercoil
- Tehsil: Thovalai
- Revenue block: Azhagiapandiapuram
- Named for: beautiful land of Pandia Dynasty

Government
  - Type: Town Panchayat
  - Body: Azhgiapandiapuram Town Panchayat
  - Prime minister: Narendra Modi

Area
  - Total: 10.24 km^{2} (3.95 sq mi)
- Elevation: 70 m (230 ft)
- Highest elevation (Panchagiri Peak): 253 m (830 ft)
- Lowest elevation: 36 m (118 ft)

Population (2011)
  - Total: 12,183
  - Density: 1,194.4/km^{2} (3,093/sq mi)
- Demonym: Azhaiyandrumkaran

Languages
  - Official: Tamil
- Time zone: UTC+5:30 (IST)
- Postal code: 629851
- Vehicle registration: TN - 74
- Website: townpanchayat.in/azhagiapandipuram

Azhagiapandiapuram is a second grade town panchayat in Kanniyakumari district in the state of Tamil Nadu, India. It is located at the centre of Pazhayar valley. It is one of the four town panchayat's in Thovalai taluk.

== Location and Significance ==
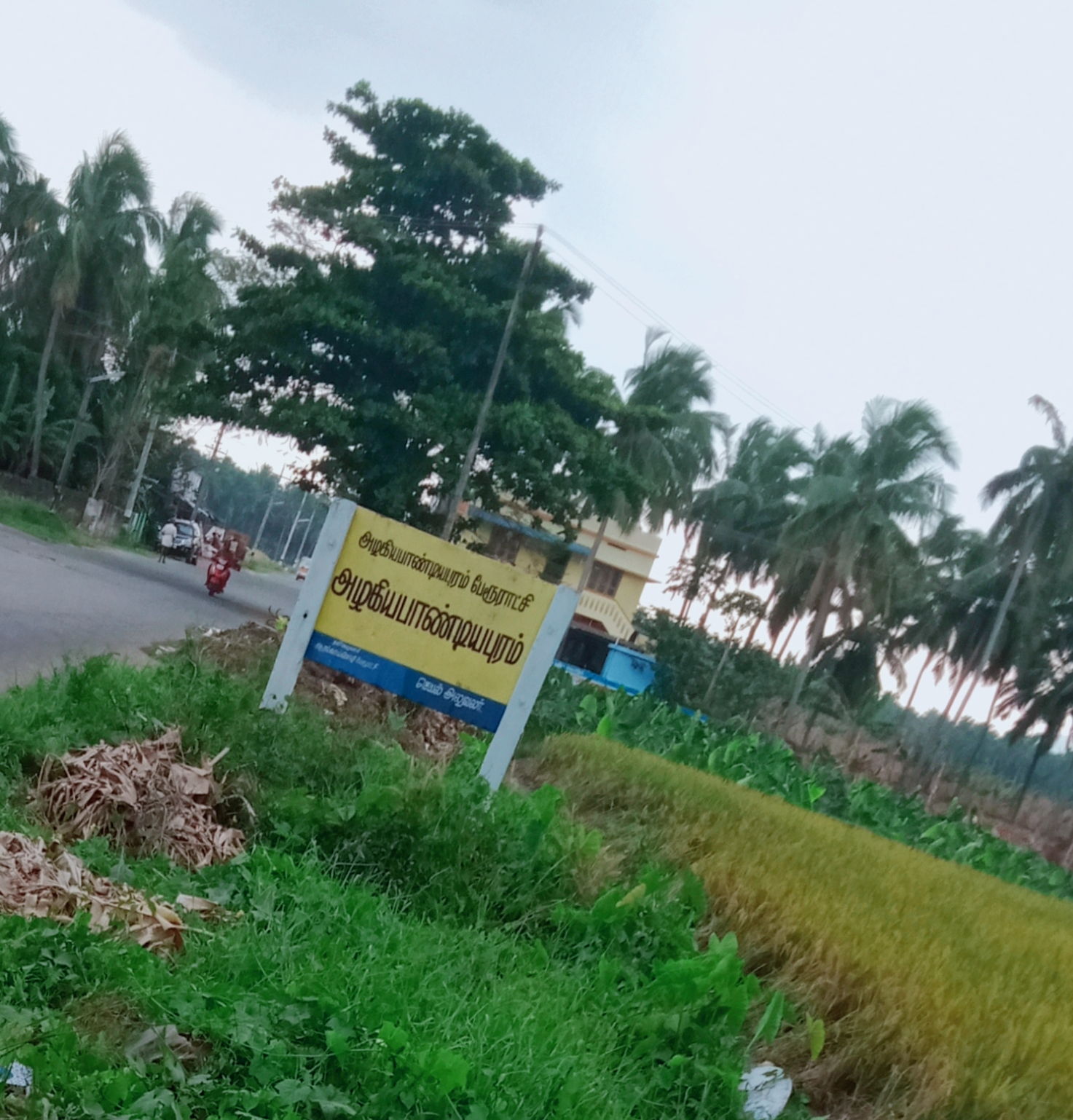
Azhagiapandiapuram village

The town spans an area of around 10.24 km^{2} with Ettamadai, Kesavanputhoor, Melkarai, Perunthalaikadu, Kurathiyarai, Thomaiyarpuram and Palkulam as its sub-villages. The places situated in the vicinity of the town include Asambu Reserve Forest to the North, Derisanamcope and Thittuvilai to the south, and Kadukkarai and Kattuputhoor to the East, Chiramadam to Southwest, Gnalam to west and Arumanallur to Northwest.

Azhagiapandiapuram is located 70 km Southeast of the Trivandrum Metropolitan Region and 15 km to the North of Nagercoil the nearest city. Azhagiapandiapuram is 32 km away from the commercial towns of Marthandam and it is 35 km to the Northwest of Tourism hub Kanyakumari.

== Demographics ==
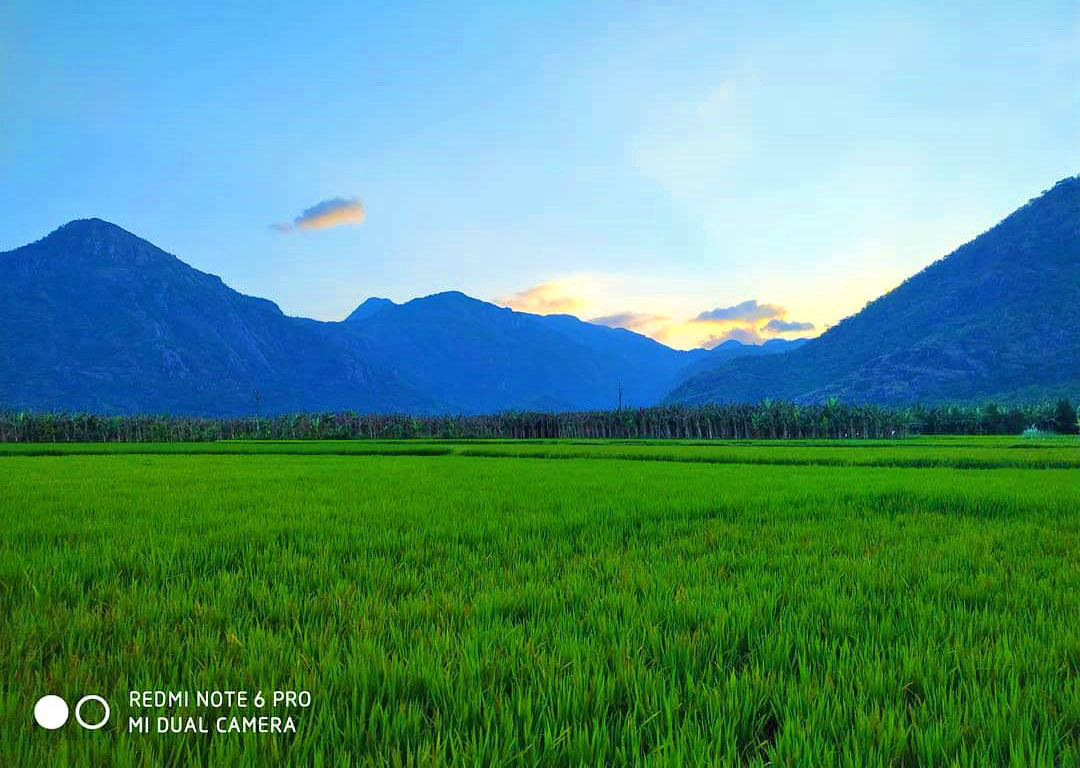
Azhagiapandiapuram

as of 2011 India census, Azhagiapandiapuram had a population of 11,392. Males constitute 50% of the population and females 50% in which female population is just more than male population. Azhagiapandiapuram has an average literacy rate of 83.71%, higher than the national average of 59.5%; with male literacy of 85.02% and female literacy of 82.40%. Scheduled Castes and Scheduled Tribes accounted for 4.50% and 0.15% of the population respectively. The town had a total of 3146 households.

== History ==
The Ay clan was one of the major hill-chiefs of early historic south India. Members of the Ay family – of the Podiyil Hills (the Aykudi) – were related to the early historic Cheras of central Kerala. Towards the close of the early historic period, Pandya supremacy might have extended to the Ay territory (through it is likely that the Ay gained their independence during the Kalabhra period).

A number of Ay chiefs such as Andiran, Titiyan and Atiyan are mentioned in the early Tamil poems.

- Ay Andiran is praised by early Tamil poets such as Mudamochiyar, Odakizhar, and Kiranar in Purananuru He is mentioned in the Purananuru as the "Lord of Podiyil Mala" in southern Western Ghats. He is said to have defeated the Kongu chiefs and pursued them to the Arabian Sea. He was an elder contemporary of the Chera chief Antuvan Cheral.
- Ay Titiyan (the Podiyil Chelvan) is praised by authors Paranar and Bhuta Pandya (the Pandya chief) in Akananuru. It seems that Ay Titiyan was a vassal of the Pandya ruler Bhuta Pandya.
- Ay Atiyan, successor to Ay Titiyan, is mentioned by authors Paranar and Madurai Kanakkayanar in Akananuru. Paranar and Kanakkayanar also mention Podiyil Mala, the Ay base, as the property of Pachupun Pandya (Azhakiya Pandya), the successor to Bhuta Pandya.
- An Ay ruler took part in the famous battle of Talai-yalankanam, in which the Pandya chief Nedum Chezhiyan defeated several of his enemies.

== Etymology ==
The name Azhagiapandiapuram is derived from the name of the Pandya chieftain Azhagiapandian, who ruled this region in the sangam period.

== Administration ==
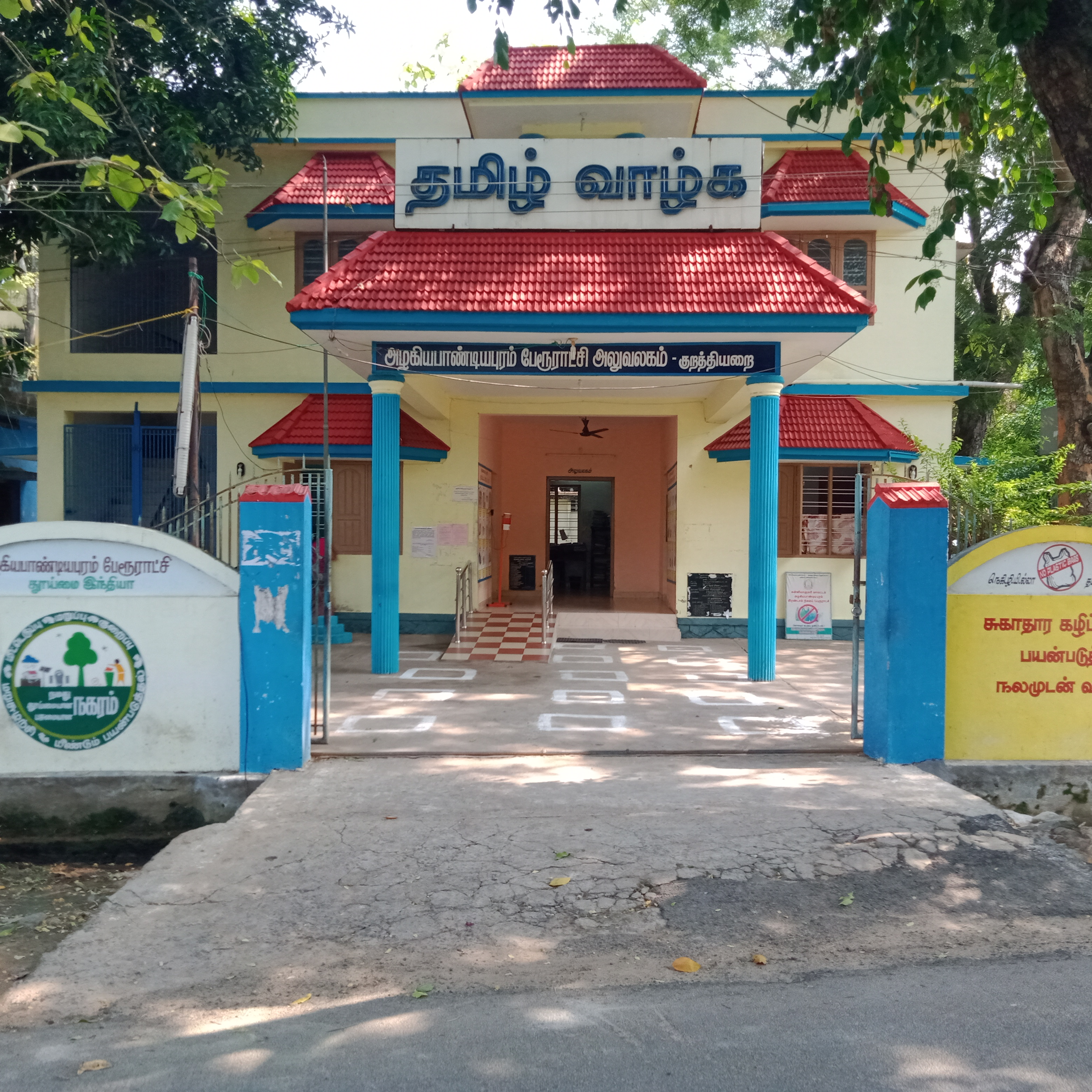
Panchayat office

Azhagiapandiapuram is a town panchayat located in Kanyakumari district. It has 15 wards in the panchayat. It comes under Bhoothapandy Police limit of Nagercoil subdivision. It has forest range office, which is one of the five forest range offices in Kanyakumari district.

== Areas of interest ==
Ettamadai is a trade centre in Azhagiyapandipuram town panchayat. Holy family church in Ettamadai is guarded by a hill and the hills has views from the top. Ulakai aruvi(Ulakkai falls) is another tourist spot. Azhgiyapandipuram village is surrounded by Western ghats on all sides except south.

== List of villages ==
Azhagiapandiapuram firka is one of the 18 firkas in Kaniyakumari district and it is one of the 3 firkas in Thovalai taluk. List of villages comes under Azhagiapandiapuram firka.

1. Derisanamcope
2. Gnalam
3. Arumanallur
4. Thadikkarankonam
5. Kattuputhur
6. Ananthapuram (Kadukkarai)
7. Thidal

== Festivals ==
There are at least eleven temples in the village. The major festivals celebrated are:

PLACE OF WORSHIP	FESTIVAL NAME	DAYS	MONTH
Arulmigu Veeravanangai Amman Temple	Kalivoottu Thiruvizha	3 Days	March
Holy Family Church	Thirukudumba Thiruvizha	10 Days	January
Kasi Vishwanathar Temple	Theppa Thiruvizha	5 Days	January
