= Poigai Dam =

Dam in Tamil Nadu, India

Coordinates: 8.2682°N 77.5086°E

The Poigai Dam in India was planned, built, and inaugurated in 2000 by the then-ruling government DMK. Kalaingar Karunanidhi, the chief minister at the time, was instrumental in the construction. Durai Murugan, the public affairs minister opened the dam to the public.

The dam mainly serves the surrounding localities like Aralvaimozhi for agriculture and drinking purposes. Farmers cultivating crops in 242 acres in Thovalai, Chenbagaramanpudur, Aralvoimozhi, and Pazhavur villages would get water through water channels and 208.23 acres of land would get water for irrigation through eight ponds along the downstream of the dam fed by the water channel. Another 497.62 acres of land would get water through eight other irrigation system ponds fed by the river.

The tail-end farmers would benefit from the release of water from the Poigai dam. The full capacity of the dam is 42 feet.
