= Punnai Nagar =

Punnai Nagar Punna Kathu Vilai
- Town
- Country: India
- State: Tamil Nadu
- District: Kanyakumari

Languages
  - Official: Tamil
- Time zone: UTC+5:30 (IST)
- PIN: 629004
- Vehicle registration: TN 74

Punnai Nagar (Tamil: புன்னை நகர்) is a small residential in Nagercoil, Tamil Nadu, India. Konam Polytechnic and Govt Engineering colleges are situated next to Punnai Nagar. Many of the government quarters are situated around Punnai Nager and the Konam area.

Punnai Nagar is within the Kottar Vicariate of the Kottar Diocese, served by the Church of Our Lady of Lourdes.
