= Bhoothalingaswamy Temple =

Shiva temple in Kanyakumari district, Tamil Nadu, India

Coordinates: 8.2631°N 77.449024°E

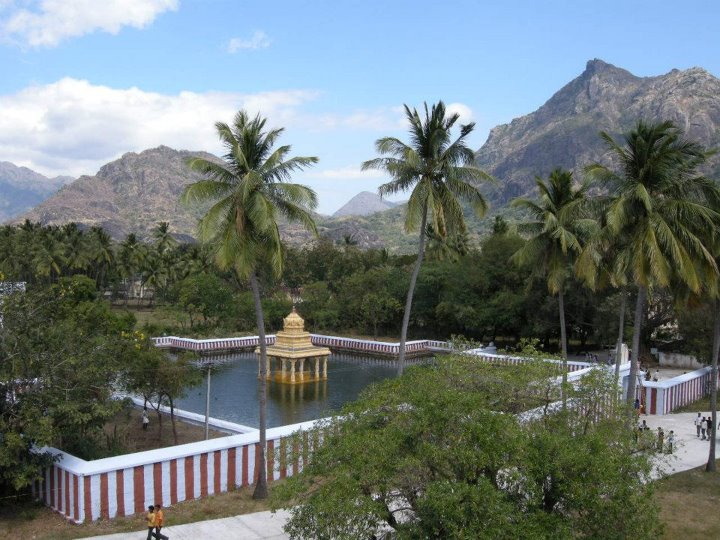
Bhoothalingaswamy Temple

The Bhoothalingaswamy Temple is an Indian temple located at Boothapandi, India, dedicated to the deity Lord Shiva.

== Structure of the temple ==
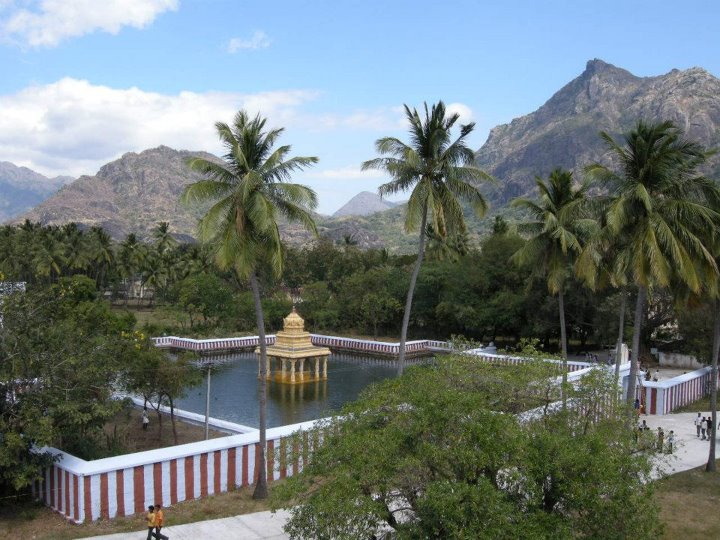
Bhoothalingaswamy Tank View

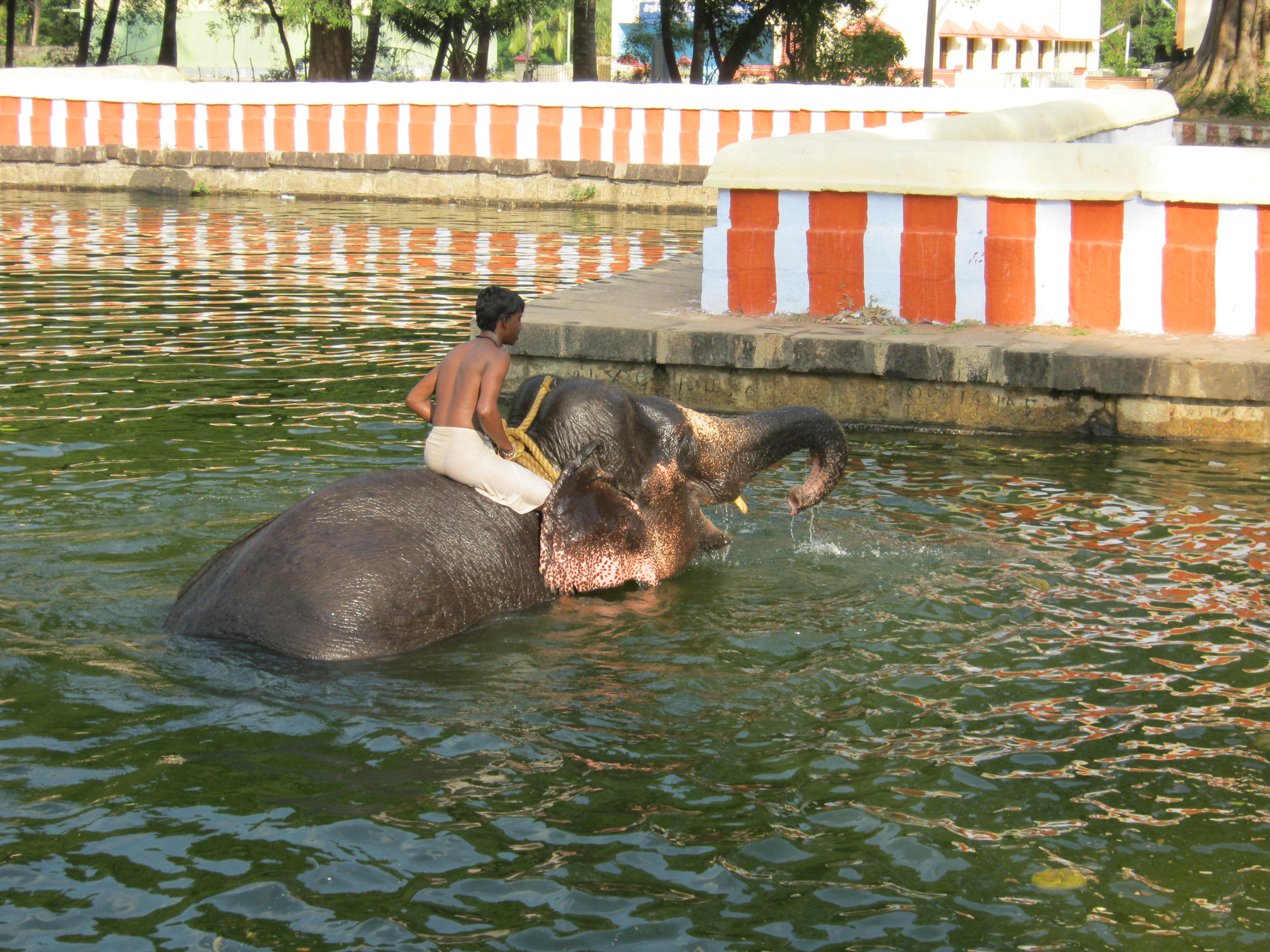
Elephant in Bhoothalingaswamy Tank

The temple is located in Boothapandi.

== History ==
The temple was supposedly constructed by king Pasum Pon Pandyan between 25AD to 50AD.

== Gallery ==
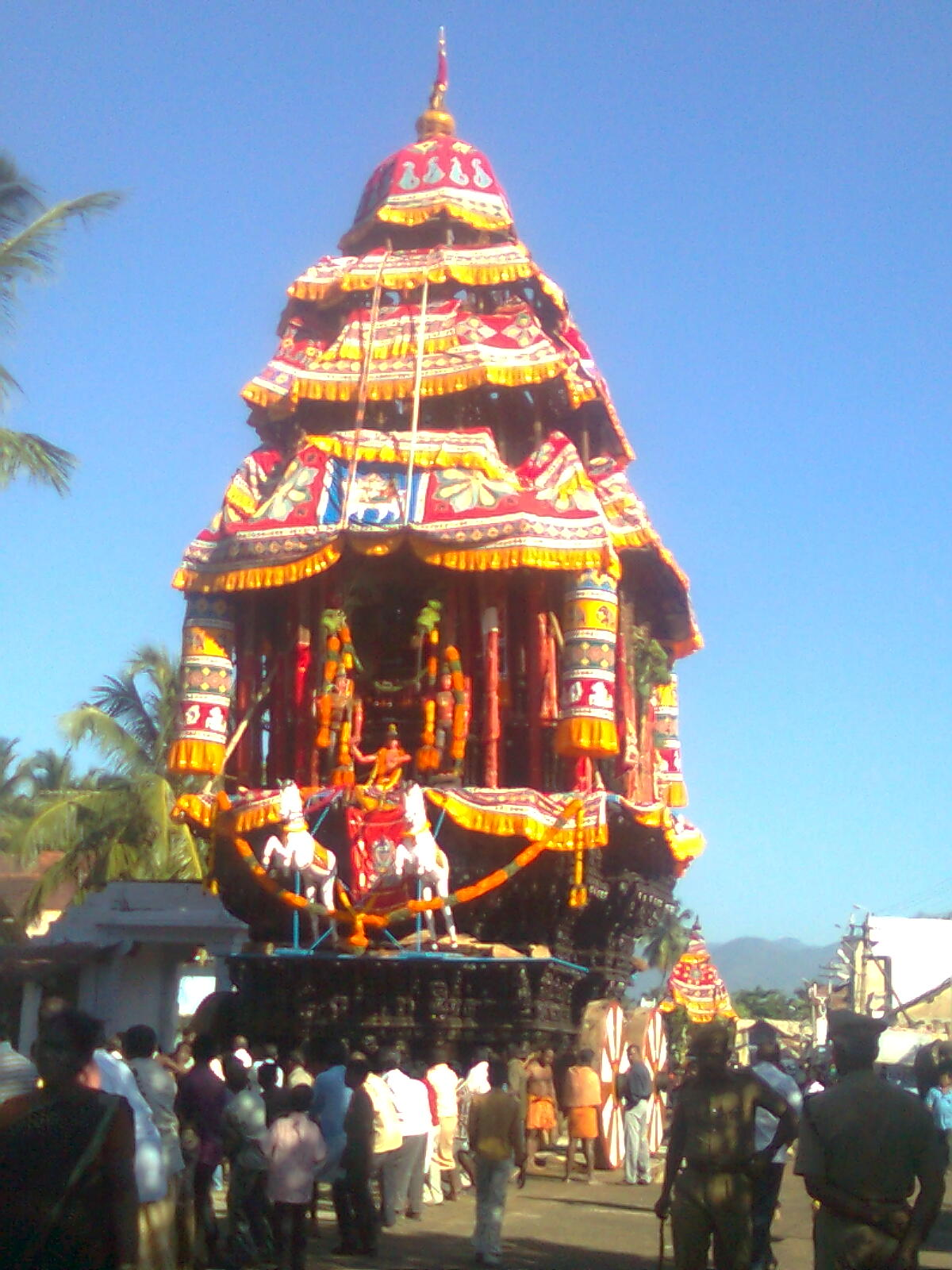
Bhoothapandy car festival

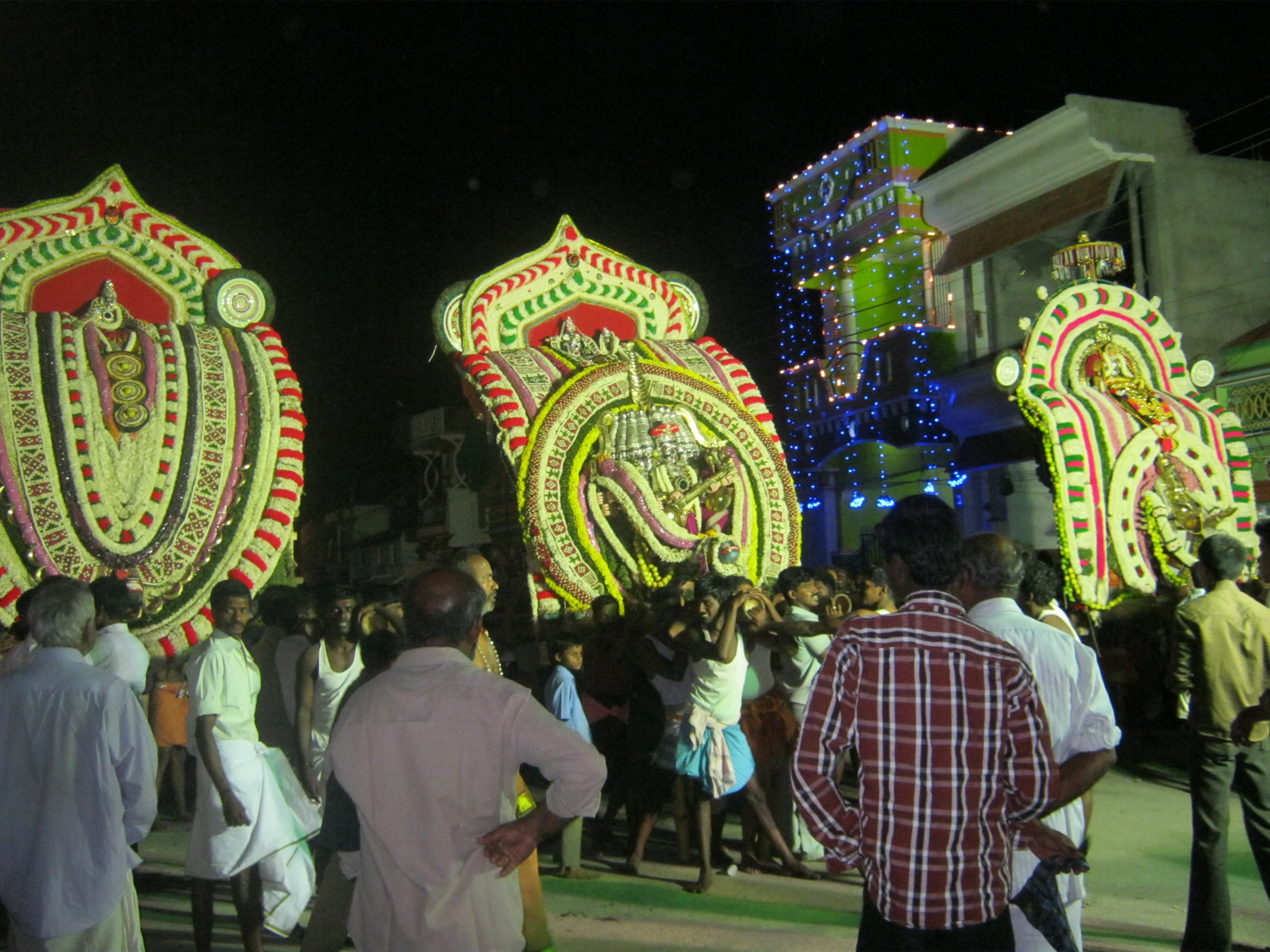
Swamy Bavani on the sevemnth day around Rathaveethi

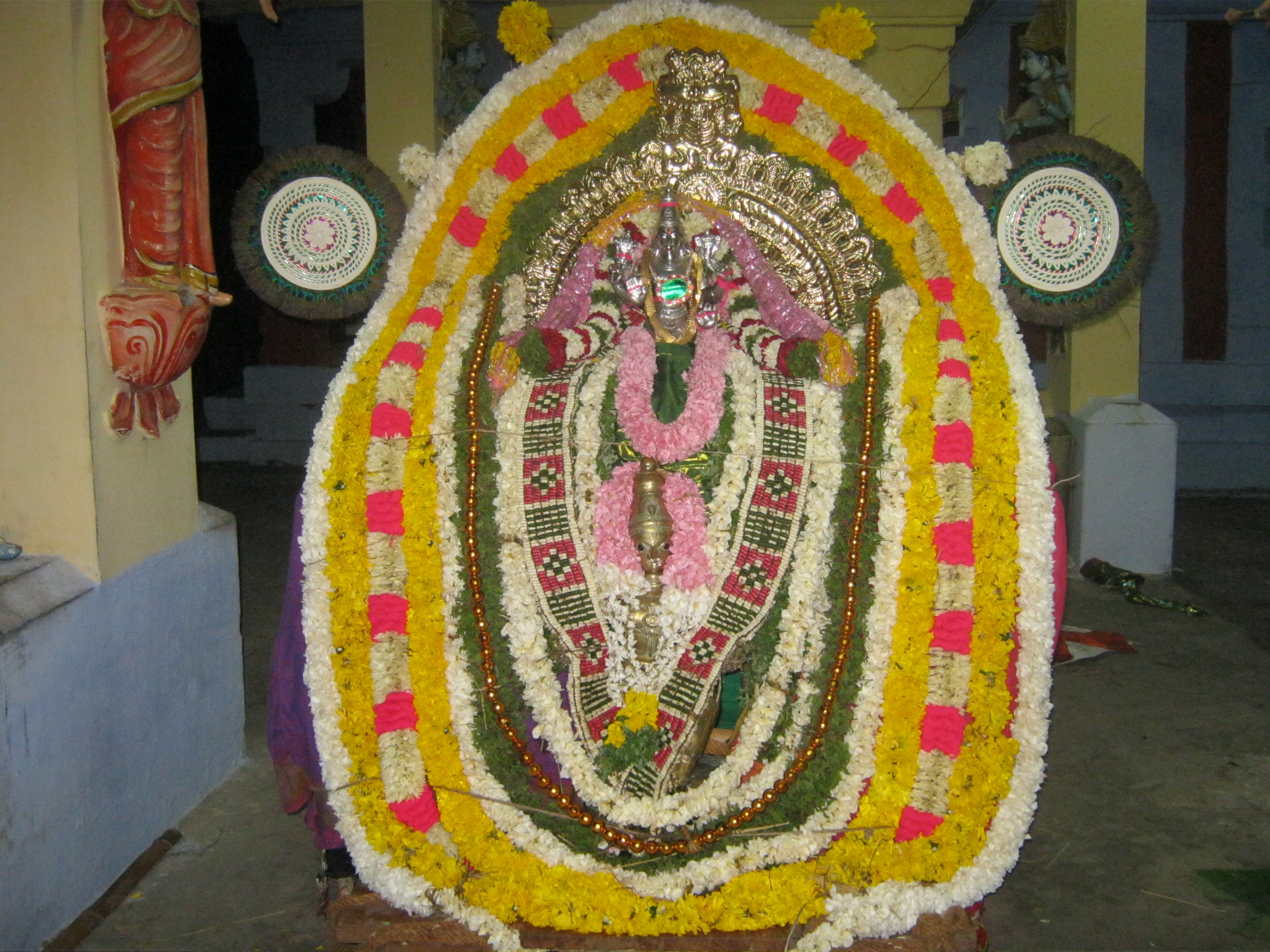
Perumal Swamy on the seventh day

Elephant at Theppakulam in 2013
