= Thiruvazhmarban temple =

Hindu temple in Kanyakumari

Thiruvazhmarban Temple
- Thirupathisaram
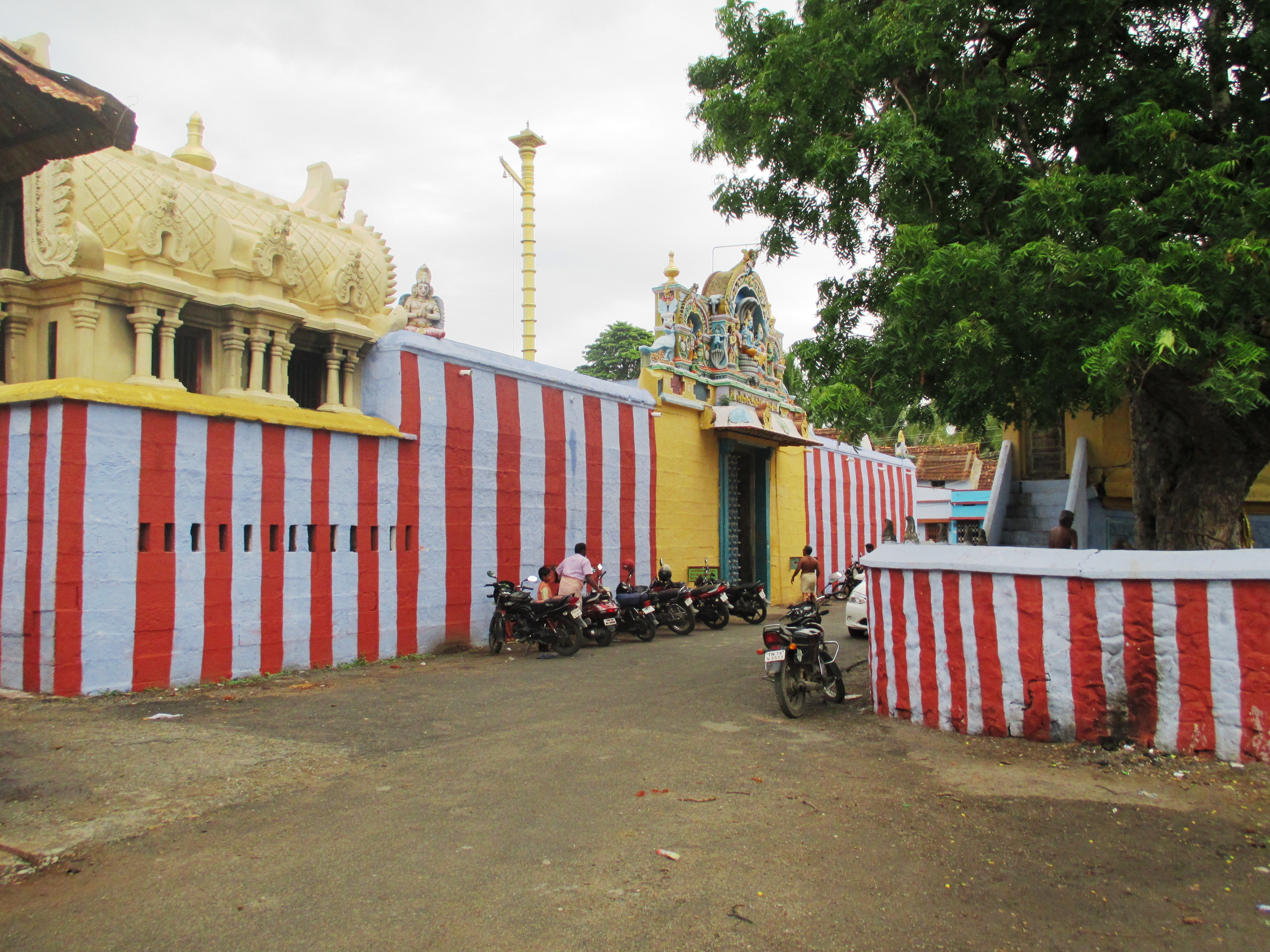

- Location in Tamil Nadu

Religion
- Affiliation: Hinduism
- District: Kanyakumari
- Deity: Thiruvazhmarban (Vishnu) Kamalavalli (Lakshmi)

Location
- Location: Thiruppathisaram
- State: Tamil Nadu
- Country: India
- Coordinates: 8°12′31″N 77°26′50″E

Architecture
- Type: Dravidian architecture

The Thiruvazhmarban Temple, also known as Sri Kuralappa Perumal Temple in Thiruppathisaram, a village in Kanyakumari district in the South Indian state of Tamil Nadu, is dedicated to the Hindu god Vishnu. Thiruvazhmarban Temple is located about 5 km far, north-easterly to Nagercoil, 20 km far, north-westerly to Kanyakumari and 45 km south-west of Nanguneri Divya Desam. Constructed in the Dravidian style of architecture, the temple is glorified in the Nalayira Divya Prabandham, the early medieval Tamil canon of the Alvar saints from the 6th–9th centuries CE. It is one of the 108 Divya Desams of malayala nadu divyadesham dedicated to Vishnu, who is worshipped as Thiruvazhmarban and his consort Lakshmi as Kamalavalli in kerala tantric traditions . The oldest inscription in the temple is from 1139 CE indicating gifts to the temple. A granite wall surrounds the temple, enclosing all its shrines. The temple tank is located opposite to the temple, outside the main entrance.

Thiruvazhmarban is believed to have appeared to the Saptarishis, the seven sages, and to Udayanangai, the mother of Nammalvar. The place is the birthplace of Nammalvar, one of the twelve Alvar saints in Vaishnava philosophy. The temple follows Thenkalai tradition of worship. Six daily rituals and many yearly festivals are held at the temple, of which the ten-day Chittirai Brahmotsavam during the Tamil month of Chittirai (April - May), Aadi Swati festival for Kulasekara Alvar, Navaratri during September - October and Vaikunta Ekadasi during Margali (December - January) being the most prominent. The temple is maintained and administered by Kanyakumari Devasthanam.

== Legend ==
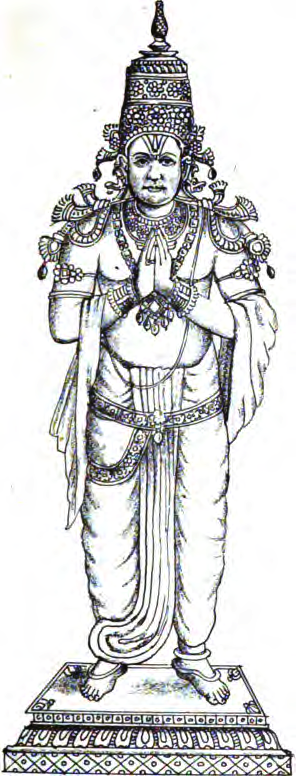
Image of Kulashekhara Alwar

As per Hindu legend, Saptarishis, the seven sages of Hindu Mythology are believed to have worshipped Vishnu at this place. Vishnu was pleased by their devotion and appeared at this place.

As per another legend, king Kulasekara, who would go on to become Kulashekhara Alwar came to this place after a conquest. His horse was lost and he was in search of the horse. He found that the horse was grazing peacefully on the banks of Soma Tirtham, the temple tank. After bathing in the tank, he felt rejuvanted worshipping the Vishnu temple in the banks. He is believed to have constructed the temple and named the place Thiruvanparisaram (pari in Tamil indicates horse). Thiru indicates respect, vazh means live and marban indicates the heart of the person.

== History ==
The exact history of the temple could not be ascertained from the inscriptions. The oldest inscription is dated from 1139 CE, when a person by name Natesan Chetti from Rajendra Cholapattinam offering donations to the temple. Two other inscriptions from the temple are dated 1613 and 1785 indicating record of offerings to the temple. A local historic account states that famous Nayak king Thirumalai Nayak (1623-59 CE) visited the place and constructed the stepped temple tank. The inscriptions in the temple refer the place is Thiruvanparisaram.

== Architecture ==
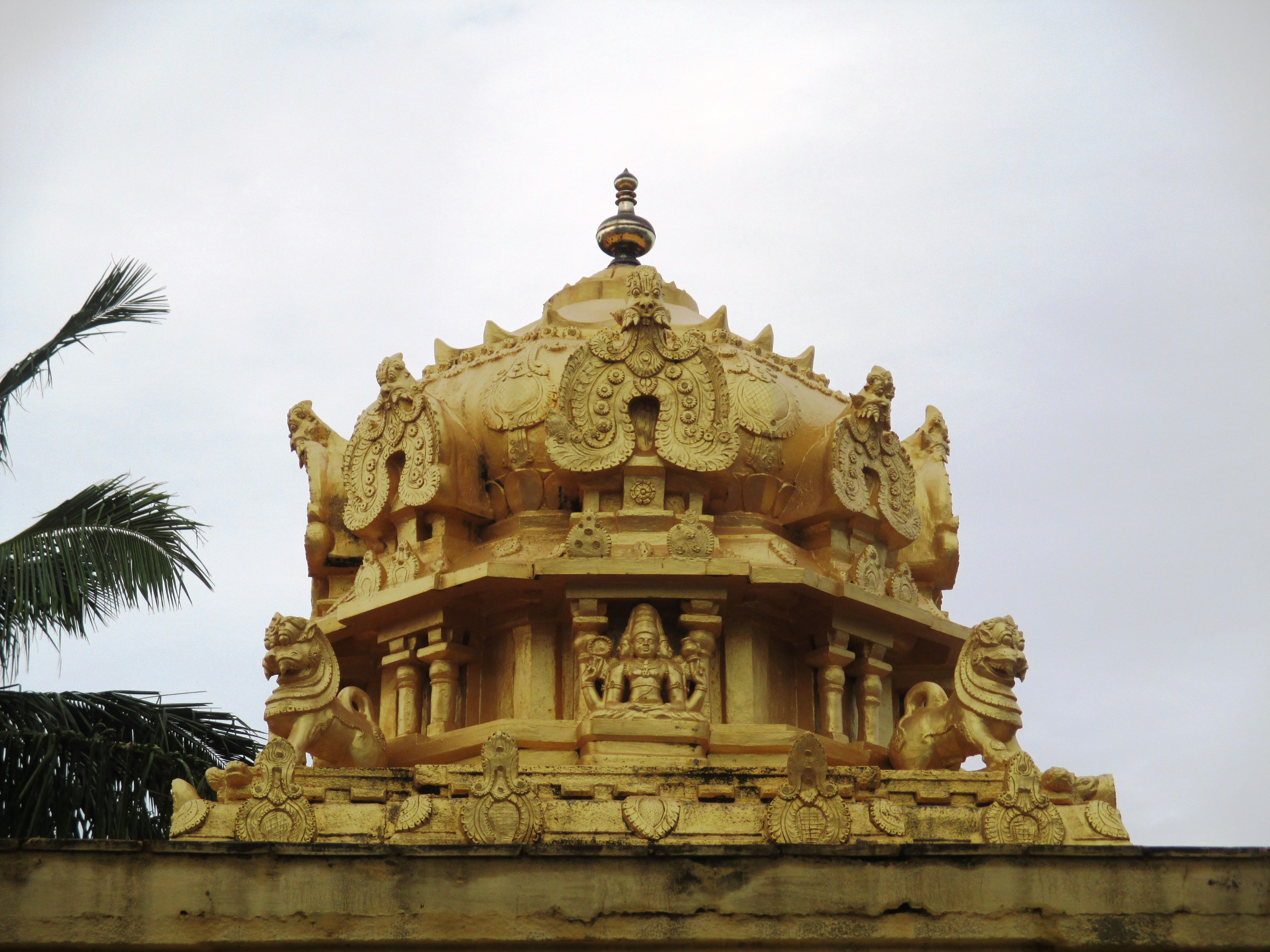
The vimanam of the temple

Thiruvazhmarban temple covers an area of about 2 acres (0.81 hectares) and has a five-tiered gopuram (gateway tower). The temple in enclosed in a rectangular enclosure surrounded by granite walls. The central shrine houses the image of the presiding deity, Thiruvazhmarban in sitting posture. There is no separate shrine for his consort Lakshmi as she is believed to reside in his chest. Surrounding the presiding deity, the images of Saptharishis are present. The images of Rama, Lakshmana and Sita are located to the right of the presiding deity. The image of Thiruvazhmarban is made of a compound of lime and granite. The sanctum also houses the images of Vishvaksenara, Kulasekara Alvar, Nataraja and Sivakami. The festival deity is made of panchaloha and all the ablution related worship practises are done only for festival deity. The shrines of Garuda, Anjaneya, Ramanuja, Vedanta Desika and Alvars are found in the second precinct. The temple tank, Soma Tirtham is located outside the main shrine. A hall named Kalyana Vimana Mandapa located near the tank houses paintings depicting Dashavatara, the ten avatars of Vishnu.

== Legend ==
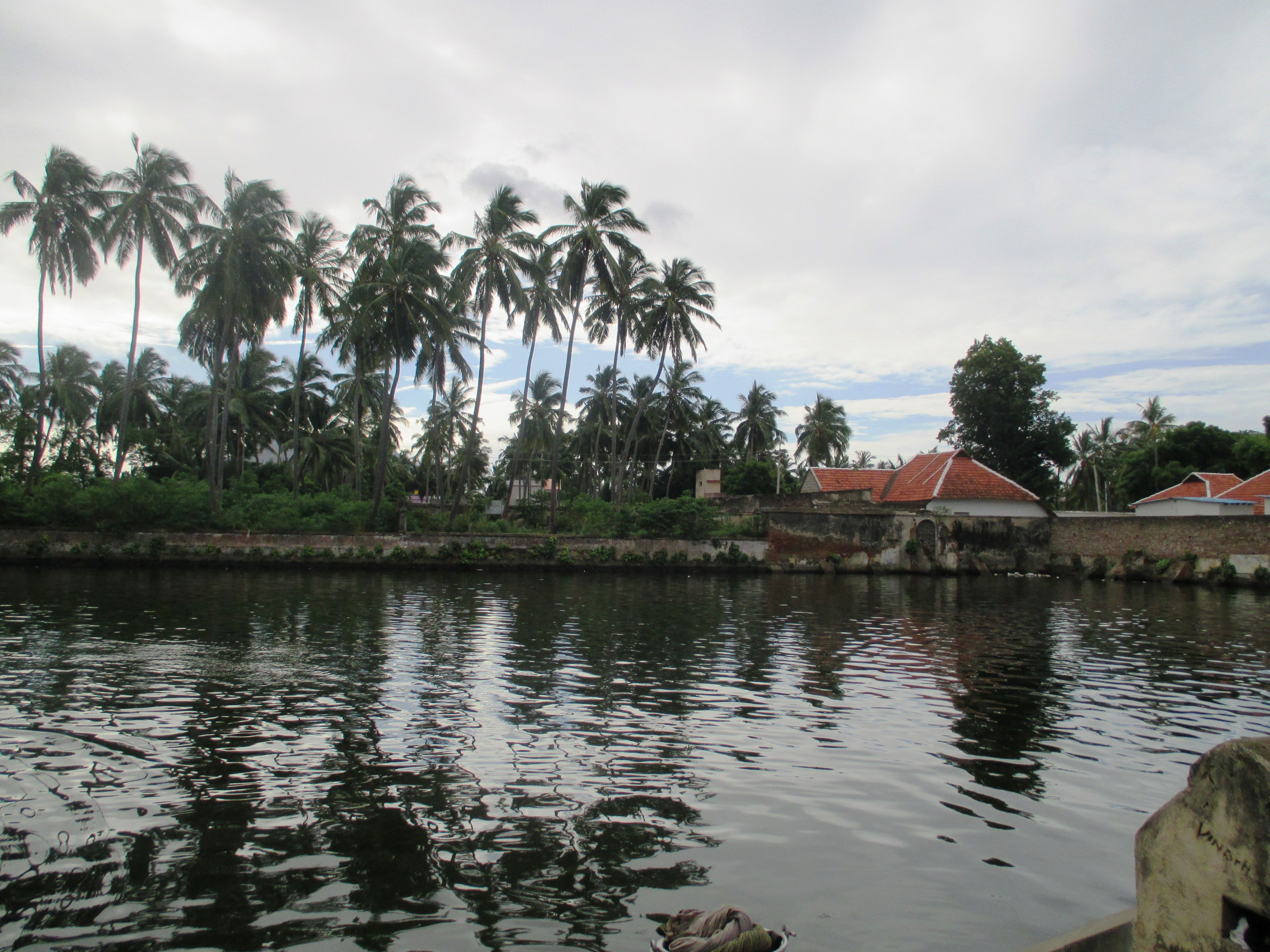
Soma Tirtham, the temple tank

As per Hindu legend, Nammalvar, the most prominent Alvar saint from the 9th century was born in Thirupathisaram. There are other accounts, which place his birthplace as Thirukurukur (modern day Alwarthirunagiri) in the southernmost region of the Tamil country. Some sources consider his to have been a princely family, although of low caste birth. According to legend he was born fully enlightened and as a baby he never cried or suckled and never opened his eyes. The child did not respond to no external stimuli and his parents carried him in a golden cradle from Tirupathisaaram and left him at the feet of the deity of Sri Adhinathar in Alwarthirunagari. The child got up and climbed into a hole in a tamarind tree, sat in a lotus position, and began to meditate. He was in this state for sixteen years when a Tamil poet and scholar, on his trip to North India, named Madhurakavi Alvar saw a bright light shining to the south, and followed it until he reached the tree where the boy was residing. Madhurakavi asked a divine question on existence to the boy for which he responded that if the soul identifies with the body, it will be the body but if it serves the divine, it will stay in Vaikuntha and think of God. The boy was named Nammalvar and he went on to recite verses, which were recorded by Madhurakavi and later went on to be compiled as Nalayira Divya Prabhandam along with the works of other Alvars.

== Festival ==
During the ten-day Chittirai Brahmotsavam during the Tamil month of Chittirai (April–May), the festival deities of the temple are taken around the streets of the temple in a chariot drawn by hundreds of devotees.
