= Thiruppathisaram =

- Neighbourhood
- Thiruppathisaram, Tamil Nadu
- Coordinates: 8°12′28.4″N 77°27′37.1″E
- Country: India
- State: Tamil Nadu
- District: Kanyakumari district
- Elevation: 47 m (154 ft)

Languages
  - Official: Tamil language, English language
  - Speech: Tamil, English
- Time zone: UTC+5:30 (IST)
- Telephone Code: 04652xxxxxx
- Neighbourhoods: Nagercoil, Vadasery, Thovalai

Thiruppathisaram is a village in the Kanyakumari District of Tamil Nadu, the southern Indian state. This village is renowned for the Thiruvazhmarban Temple dedicated (Vishnu).

== The Place ==
Thiruppathisaram, also known as Thiruvanparisaram, is to the north-east of Nagercoil in Kanyakumari district, around 3.5 km (2.2 mi) from Nagercoil. The place derives its name from a 5000-year-old temple dedicated to Thiruvazhimarban (Lord in whose heart Thiru - Goddess Padmavati abodes), a form of Vishnu. Thiruppathisaram is part of the 108 Divya Desams and Malayala Nattu Thiruppatigal.

The mother of Nammalvar, a Vaishnavite poet-saint, was born in this village, before 5000 years.

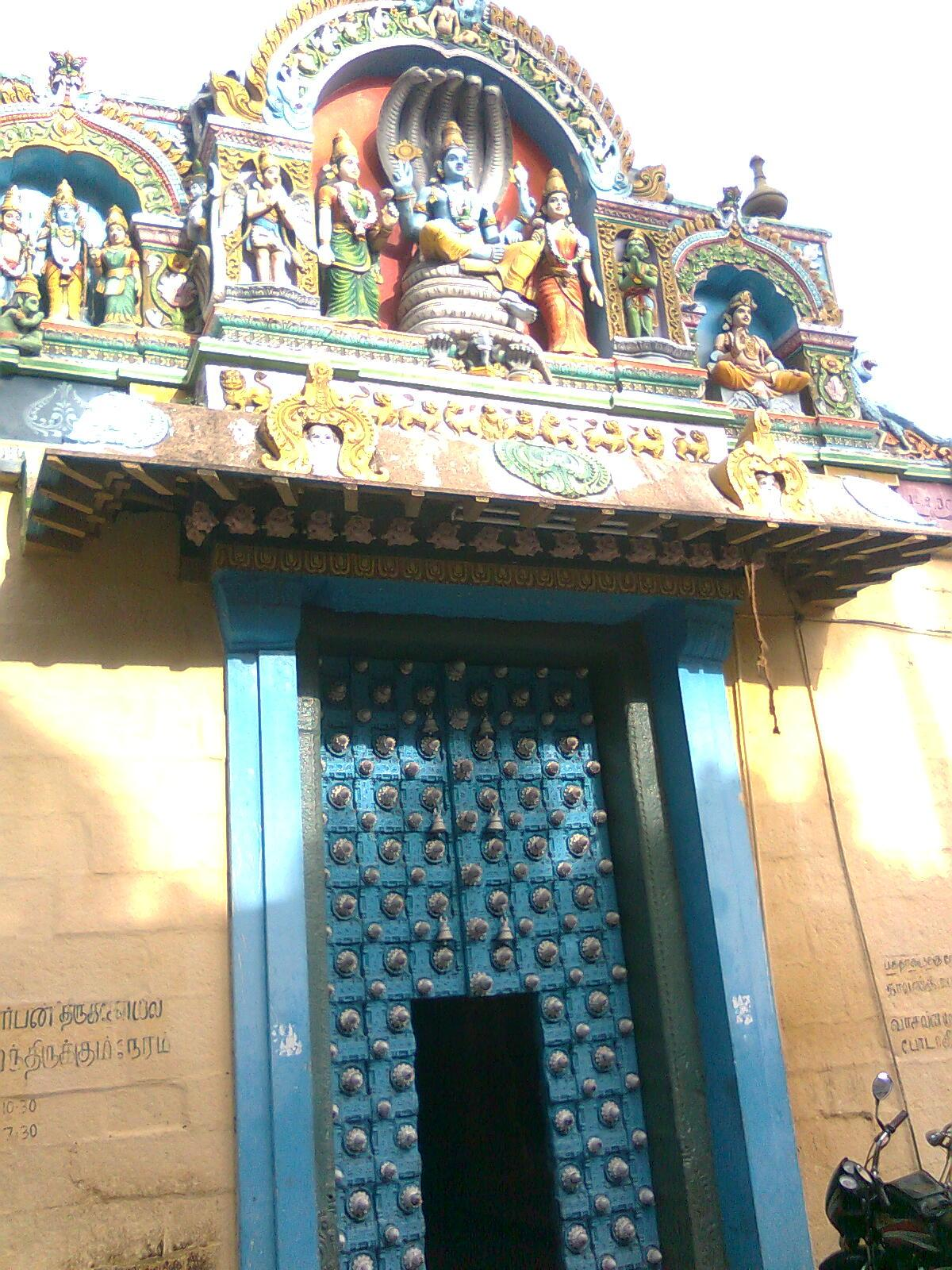
Temple Entrance

== Temple & the Deity ==
The idol of the chief deity is 9 ft (2.7 m) tall and made of a special element called Katusarkara Yogam (Mustard and Jaggery paste) and no Abhishekam (ritual bathing) is performed to it. The deity has shangu and chakra in the hands and Goddess Mahalakshmi in his chest (ThiruVazhMarbhan). Dashavathara paintings adorn the Indra Kalyana Mandapam of this temple. Other shrines for Garuda, Ganesha, Rama, Vishwaksenar, Nammalvar, and Nataraja are present. There is a temple tank opposite to the temple for taking bath.

The deity had a crown made of Gold and adorned with diamonds and other precious stones. This was stolen and the thief cut it into multiple pieces. The authorities caught the thief and the booty was recovered, but to this day, it is lying in the same state.

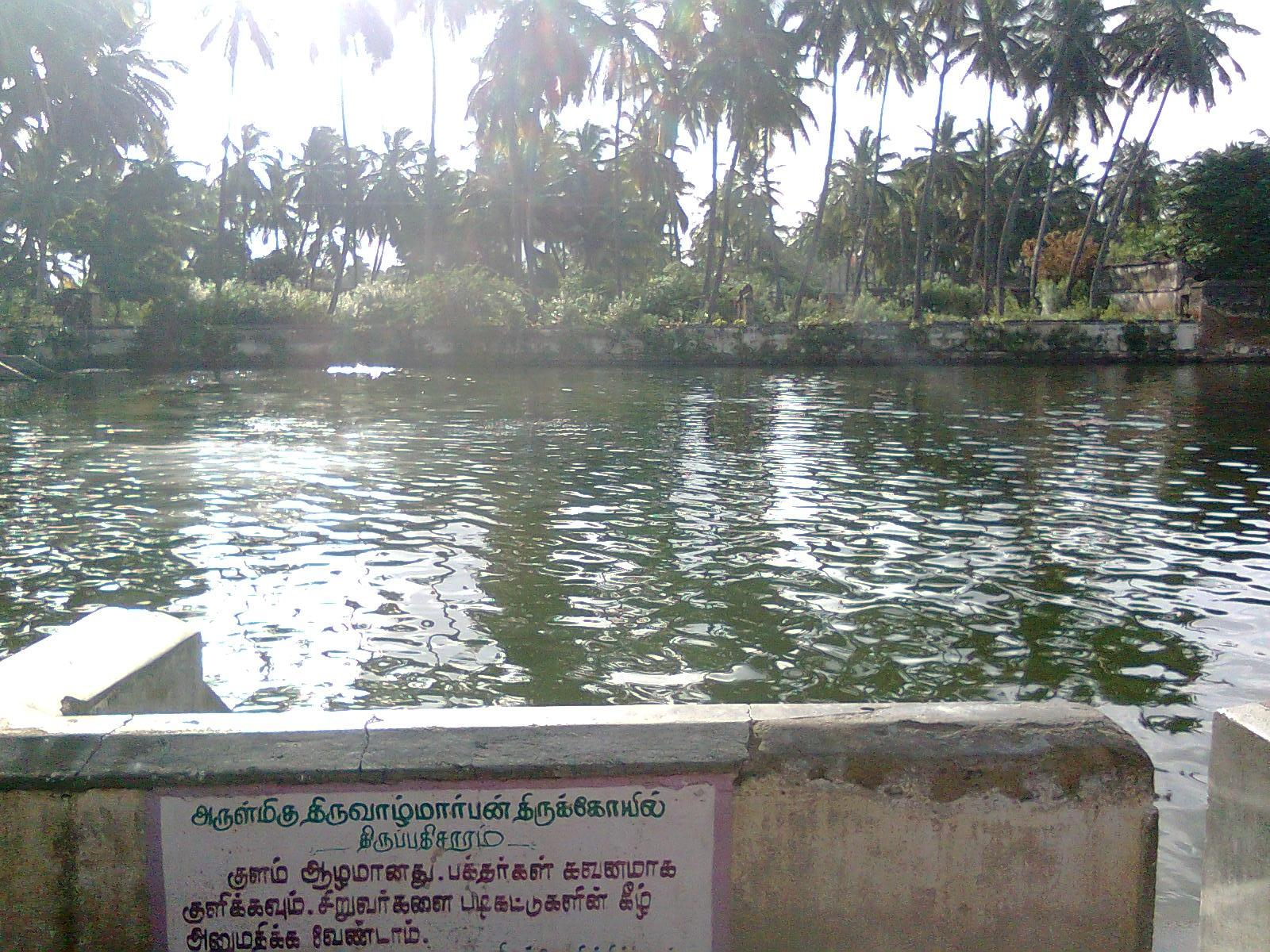
Temple Tank

== Renovations ==
Renovation of this temple were carried out by King Kulashekhara and Thirumalai Nayak. This temple is maintained by the Government of Tamil Nadu through the Devaswom Board. A few years ago renovation and kumbha-abhishekam (ritual consecration) was carried out by the Devaswom Board.

== Special Mentions ==
This place has a mention in the Nalayiradivyaprabandam - the holy book of the vaishnavaites. Nammalvar's mother hailed from Thiruppathisaram.

This place has the reputation of being the birthplace of a Mother, who gave an illustrious son Nammalvar to spread and sing the glory of Lord Vishnu. The wedding of Udaya Nangai, daughter of Tiruvazhmarban Pillai in the service of Nanjil Nadu Tiruvenparisaram with Kaarimaran a chieftain of Kurunadu took place in the house of the bride. They had no child though years rolled by. The couple went to Tirukurungudi, also a Divyadesa and prayed to Lord Nambi seeking child boon. Lord Nambi appeared before them and offered Himself to be born to them and advised them that the child be taken to the Tamarind tree in Tirunagari and assured that He as a child would bring great reputation to them.

Mother Udayanangai delivered a male child on Visaka Star day in Vaikasi month (May–June) on a poornima-full moon day. They took the child as directed by Lord in a golden cradle to the tamarind tree in Azhwar Tirunagari. The child simply climbed on the tree with Gnana Mudra, meditated upon Lord Aadhi Natha to the chilling surprise of those gathered there. The child was in penance for 16 years. This is the sacred history of Tirupathisaram.
