= CSI Institute of Technology =

Engineering college in Tamil Nadu, India

Coordinates: 8.2418°N 77.5010°E

C.S.I Institute of Technology
- Established: 1994
- Founders: Church of South India
- Academic affiliations: Anna University, Chennai
- Chancellor: Bishop of kanyakumari Diocese
- Principal: Dr.N.M. Spencer Prathap Singh
- Location: Thovalai, Tamil Nadu, India
- Campus: Suburban, 30 acres (12 ha)
- Nickname: CSIIT
- Website: www.csiit.ac.in

CSI Institute of Technology (CSIIT), known as CSI Engineering College, is an engineering institution located in Thovalai, Kanyakumari, Tamil Nadu, India. CSI Institute of Technology is a Christian Minority Institution, established in 1995 by the Church of South India (C.S.I), Kanyakumari Diocese. The college is certified to ISO 9001:2000 standard.

== Academic programs ==
CSIIT offers undergraduate degrees in engineering in the following:

- B.E. Computer Science and Engineering
- B.E. Electrical & Electronics Engineering
- B.E. Electronics and Communication Engineering
- B.E. Mechanical Engineering
- B.E. Civil Engineering
- B.Tech. Information Technology

CSIIT offers Masters degrees in the following:

- M.E. Manufacturing Engineering
- M.E. Power Electronics & Drives Engineering
- M.E. Communication System Engineering
- M.E. Computer Science and Engineering
- M.E. Structural Engineering
- M.E. Applied Electronics
- M.E. Computer and Communication Engineering
- M.C.A. Master of Computer Applications
- M.B.A Master of Business Administration

== Corporate relationship ==
The college has tie ups with corporate industries and MNCs like:

- Microsoft India, Bangalore
- Intel India, Bangalore
- AmadaSoft India, Bangalore
- National Instruments
- Agilent Technologies
- Altera Corporation
- Freescale Semiconductors
- Tata Consultancy Services, Bangalore
- Wipro Technologies
- Infosys Technologies
- Cognizant Technologies Ltd.
- HCL, Chennai

== See also ==
- List of Colleges in Kanyakumari District
