= Thalakudi =

Coordinates: 8°14′39″N 77°27′00″E

Thazhakudy
- Town Panchayat
- Interactive map of Thazhakudy
- Country: India
- State: Tamil Nadu
- District: Kanniyakumari

Government
  - Type: State Government

Population (2021)
  - Total: 8,531

Languages
  - Official: Tamil
- Time zone: UTC+5:30 (IST)
- Postal code: 629901
- Vehicle registration: TN74

Thazhakudy or "Thallhakkudi" is a town panchayat in Kanniyakumari district in the Indian state of Tamil Nadu. It is between the rivers Puthanaar and Palaiyaar.

== Demographics ==
As of 2001 India census, Thazhakudy had a population of 8531. Males constitute 50% of the population and females 50%. Thazhakudy has an average literacy rate of 78%, higher than the national average of 59.5%: male literacy is 81%, and female literacy is 74%. In Thazhakudy, 10% of the population is under 6 years of age. The village is 9 km away from Nagercoil.
