= Arumanallur =

Coordinates: 8°19′N 77°25′E

- village
- Interactive map of Arumanallur
- Country: India
- State: Tamil Nadu
- District: Thanjavur

Population (2001)
  - Total: 540

Languages
  - Official: Tamil
- Time zone: UTC+5:30 (IST)

Anumanallur is a village in the Papanasam taluk of Thanjavur district, Tamil Nadu, India.

== Demographics ==
As per the 2001 census, Arumanallur had a total population of 540 with 259 males and 281 females. The sex ratio was 1085. The literacy rate was 64.72.
