= Aralvaimozhi =

Aralvaimozhi Aramboly
- Town
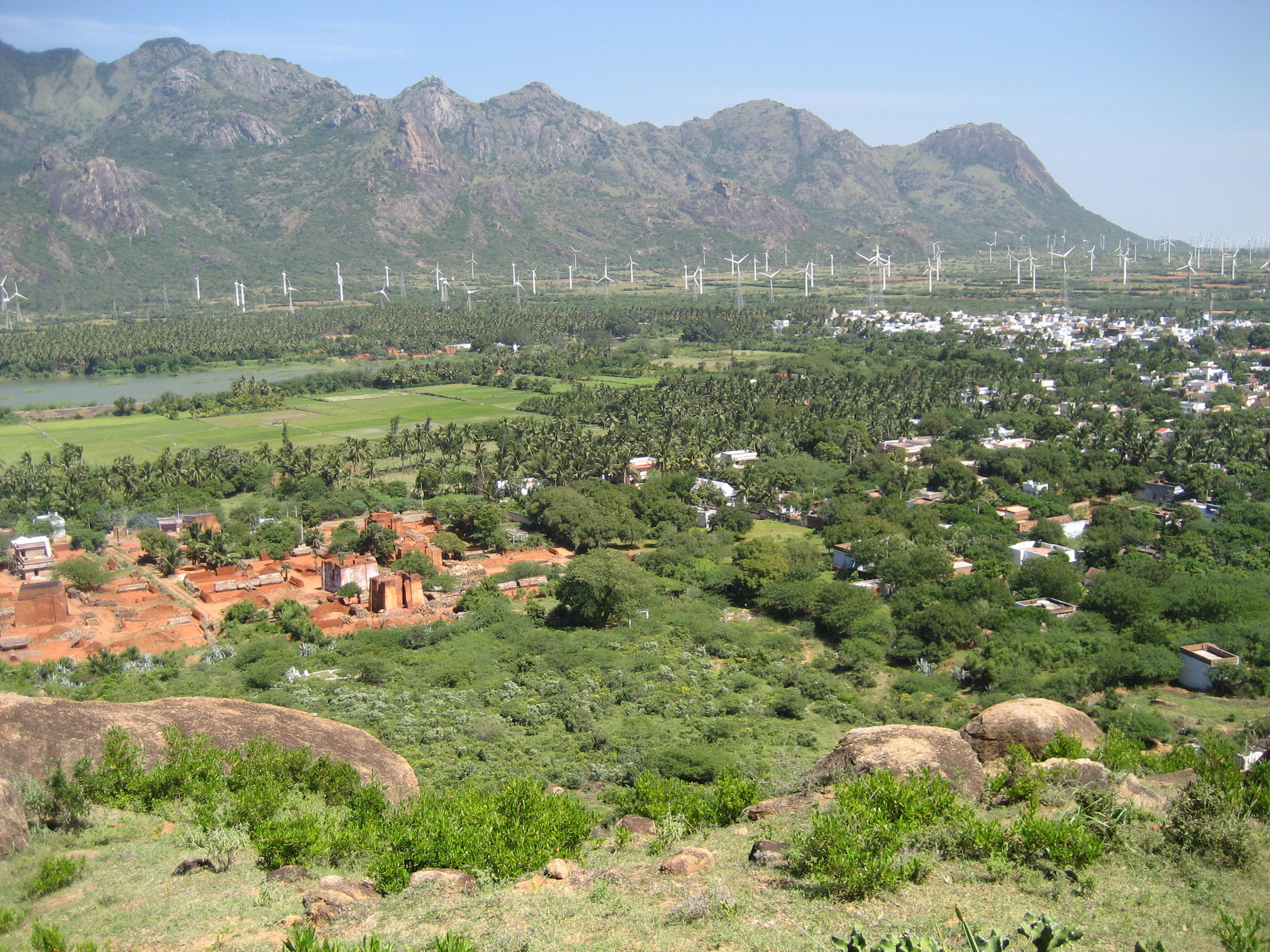

- Location in Tamil Nadu, India
- Coordinates: 8.2482°N 77.5278°E
- Country: India
- State: Tamil Nadu
- District: Kanniyakumari

Population (2011)
  - Total: 22,846
  - Estimate (2024): 32,200

Languages
  - Official: Tamil
- Time zone: UTC+5:30 (IST)
- PIN: 629301

Aralvaimozhi is a panchayat town in Kanniyakumari District in the state of Tamil Nadu, India. It is a small town situated in southern India. The town was earlier called as Aramboly during the colonial period.

== History ==
Aralvaimozhi Pass was a strategically important gap or mountain pass in the southernmost end of the Western Ghats. It connected erstwhile Venad/Travancore with the Tamil kingdoms/ Madras Presidency. Many of the invasions faced by the Chera and the successor kingdoms such as the Ays, Venad and Travancore, came via this ghat.

The name "Aral" was derived from the fort built and maintained by the rulers of Venad and later by the kingdom of Travancore to defend the kingdom from invasions from the eastern regions. It is also said that Aralvaimozhi means whispering wind. The whistling sound of wind in the region might have led to such a name.

Aralvaimozhi Fort was one of the most important forts of Travancore. It, along with Udayagiri Fort, Vattakottai Fort and Travancore lines was constructed around 1750 by the Travancorean General Eustachius De Lannoy. The fort was captured by the English East India Company in 1809 from the soldiers loyal to Velu Thampi Dalawa. The remains of the fort Known as Kottaikarai can be seen near railway station, but neglected by both railway and archeology departments.

== Demographics ==
According to the 2011 census, Aralvaimozhi had an estimated population of 22,846, of which 11,373 were males and 11,473 were females, meaning a female-male ratio of 1.01, above the Tamil Nadu state average of 0.996 and well above the national average of 0.929 females/male. The child sex ratio of Aralvaimozhi is 1.012, higher than the state average of 9.43. Aralvaimozhi has a literacy rate of 89.26%. In Aralvaimozhi, Male literacy is around 92.34% while female literacy rate is 86.20%. Aralvaimozhi Town Panchayat has total administration over 6,206 houses to which it supplies basic amenities like water and sewage. 71.24% of people in Aralvaimozhi are Hindu, 28.08% are Christian, and 0.42% are Muslim.

== Culture ==
During the invasion of Sultan Alauddin Khilji of Delhi in 1311 AD by Malik Kapoor, Meenakshi Amman and Sundareeswarar were brought from Madurai to Venadu and hid in Parakodi Kandan Shasta temple near Aralvaaimozhi. Until 1368, Meenakshi Amman remained in Aralvaimozhi. From there she was taken back to Madurai.

== Economy ==
Muppandal Wind Farm is located in Aralvaimozhi Town Panchayat. This farm is the largest in Asia and supplies the villagers with electricity for their needs. It is well known for being the greatest source of wind energy in Asia.

Poigai Dam, constructed in the year 2000 is serving water for irrigation purposes around the area. For the first time the dam was completely filled with water in 5th November 2021, making it a wonderful place to visit.

=== Wind energy ===
The 1,500 megawatts (MW) Muppandal wind farm is the country's largest onshore wind farm which is the Asia's second largest windfarm. The project features a large number of wind turbines of varying sizes from 200 kilowatts (KW) to 1650KW.

== Transportation ==
A railway station spelled "Aralvaimozhi", with station code AAY is situated here, and is served by Indian Railways. It is connecting many employees of ISRO_ Mahendragiri campus.

== Gallery ==
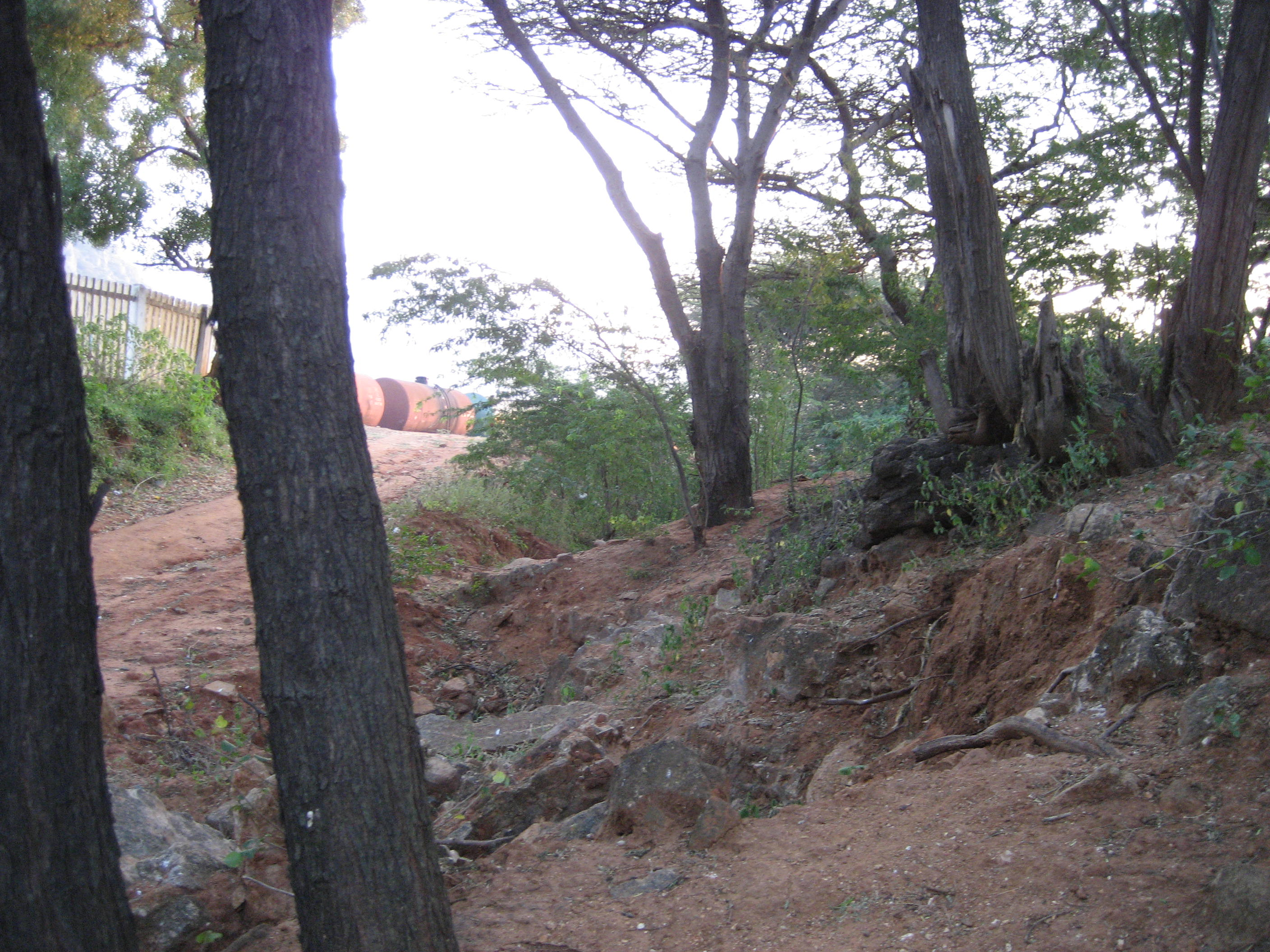
Remains of Aralvaimozhi fort found near railway station

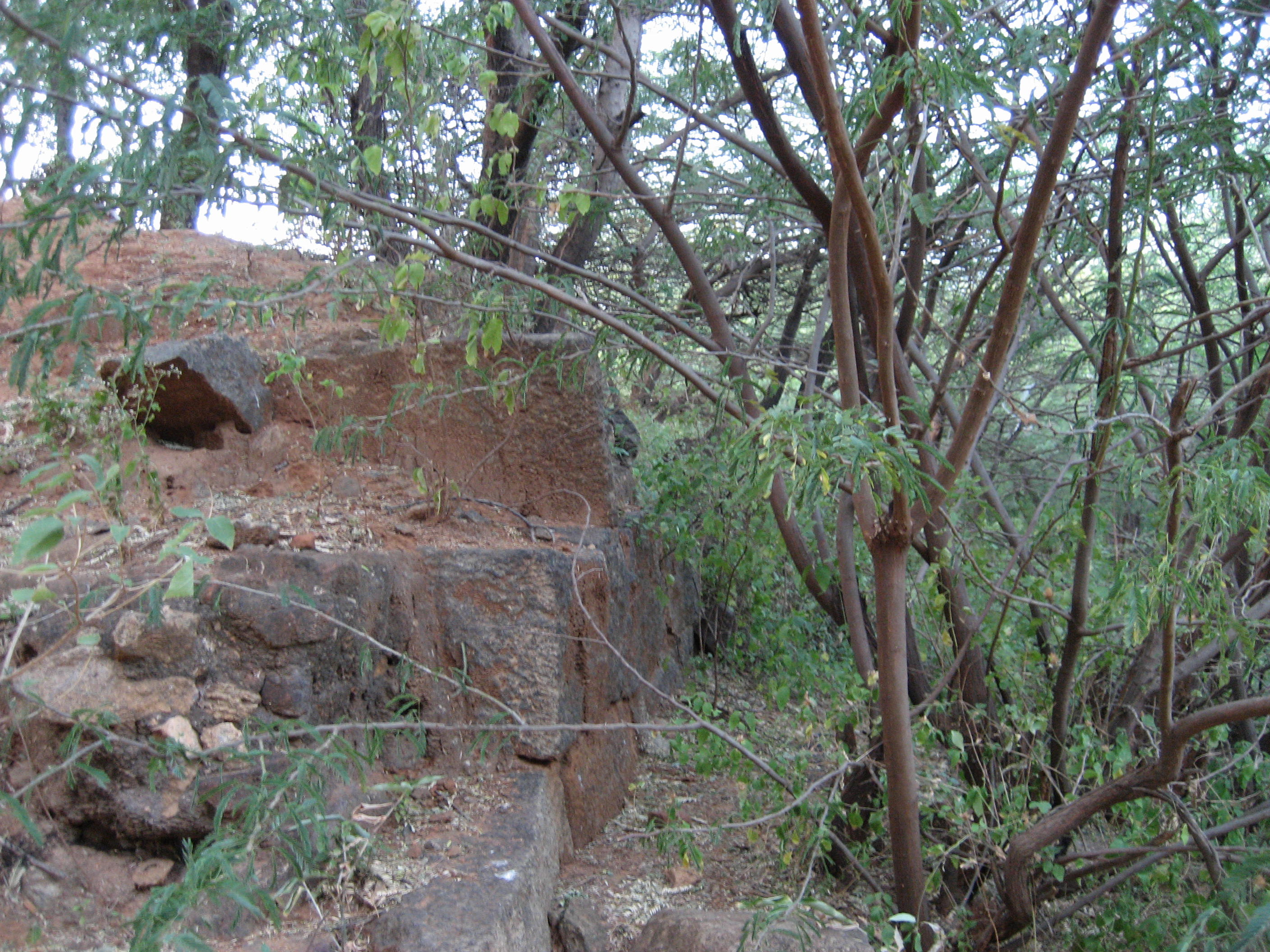
Remains of Aralvaimozhi fort found near railway station

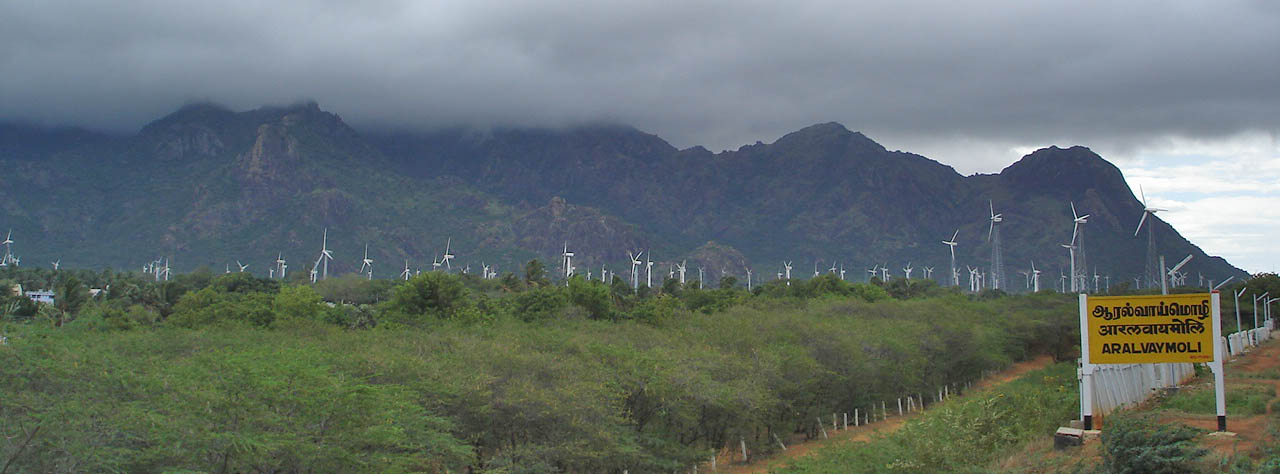
Aralvaimozhi railway station, with the wind-power mills in the background

== See also ==
- Aryankavu pass
- Palakkad Gap
