= Konam, Nagercoil =

Neighbourhood in Kanyakumari district, Tamil Nadu, India

Konam
- Neighbourhood
- Konam, Nagercoil, Kanyakumari district, Tamil Nadu
- Coordinates: 8.1623°N 77.4094°E
- Country: India
- State: Tamil Nadu
- District: Kanyakumari
- Elevation: 64.98 m (213.2 ft)

Languages
  - Official: Tamil, English
  - Speech: Tamil, English
- Time zone: UTC+5:30 (IST)
- PIN: 629004
- Telephone code: +914652******
- Vehicle registration: TN - 74 ** xxxx
- Other Neighbourhoods: Nagercoil, Chettikulum, Kottar, Vetturnimadam, Asaripallam, Vallan Kumaran Vilai, Kurusady, Maravankudieruppu
- Corporation: Nagercoil Municipal Corporation
- LS: Kanniyakumari
- VS: Nagercoil

Konam, Nagercoil is a neighbourhood in Kanyakumari district of Tamil Nadu state in India.

== Location ==
Konam is located with the coordinates of (8.1623°N 77.4094°E) near Nagercoil.

Konam, Nagercoil (Tamil Nadu)

== Educational institutions ==
(University College of Engineering, Nagercoil), (Government College of Arts and Science, Konam), (Government Polytechnic College, Konam), (Government Industrial Training Institute, Nagercoil), (Kendriya Vidyalaya, Nagercoil) are some of the important educational institutions at Konam.

== Library ==
There is a District Library situated at Konam.

== Industry ==
Konam has the District Industries Centre, an information and project guidance center of Kanyakumari district. Also, an industrial estate is available at Konam.
