= Putheri =

- Putheri, Nagercoil (Tamil Nadu)
- Coordinates: 8.216800°N 77.432900°E
- Country: India
- State: Tamil Nadu
- Elevation: 49 m (161 ft)

Population (2001)
  - Total: 14,200

Languages
  - Official: Tamil
- Time zone: UTC+5:30 (IST)
- PIN: 629001
- Vehicle registration: TN-74 yy xxxx

Putheri is a village panchayat located in Rajakkamangalam block of Kanyakumari district, Tamil Nadu, India. The panchayat has total of seven panchayat constituencies. Out of these seven panchayat members are elected.

Nainar Yogeeswaramudaiyar Temple, Krishnaswamy Temple, Iravi Vinayagar Temple, Veerakaliamman Temple, and Maragatha Vinayagar Temple located in Putheri are under the control of Hindu Religious and Charitable Endowments Department, Government of Tamil Nadu.
