= Thittuvilai =

Thittuvilai is a town in Kanyakumari district of Tamil Nadu state, India. It lies around 13 kilometres (8.1 miles) to the west of Nagercoil.
