= Thovalai =

Neighbourhood in Kanyakumari district, Tamil Nadu, India

- Village
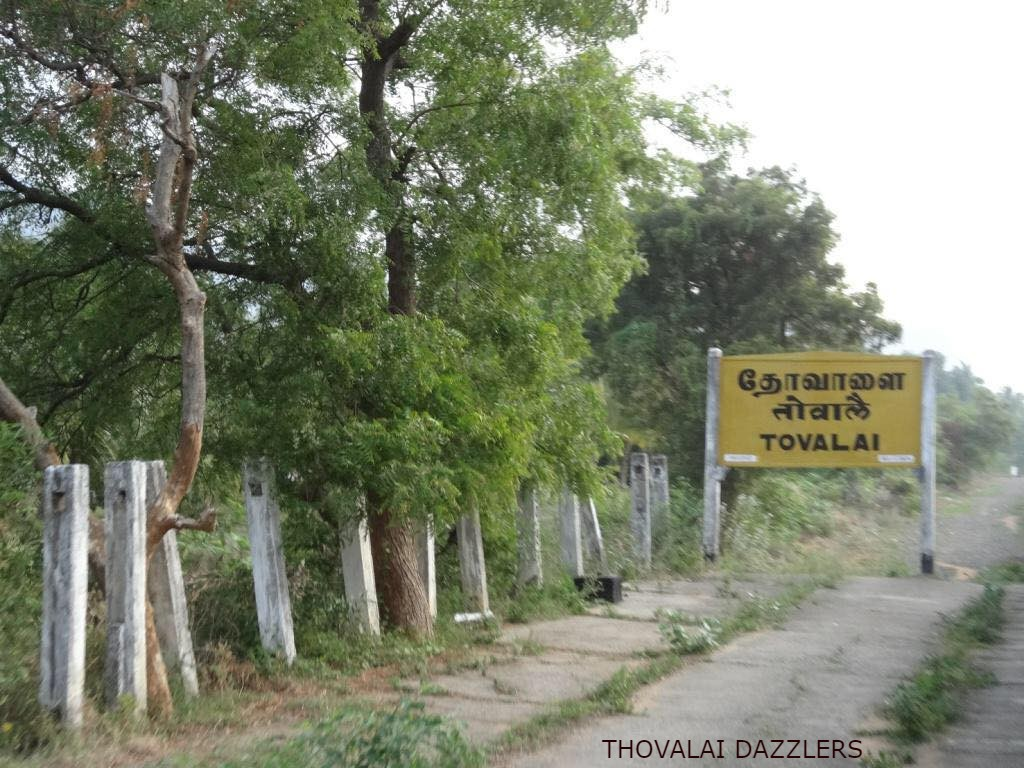
- Railway Station in Thovalai
- Nickname: Village of flowers
- Thovalai, Tamil Nadu Thovalai (India)
- Coordinates: 8.231200°N 77.506000°E
- Country: India
- State: Tamil Nadu
- District: Kanyakumari

Government
  - Body: Gram panchayat

Area
  - Total: 17.39 km^{2} (6.71 sq mi)
- Elevation: 81 m (266 ft)

Population (2011)
  - Total: 8,961
  - Density: 515.3/km^{2} (1,335/sq mi)

Languages
  - Official: Tamil
- Time zone: UTC+5:30 (IST)
- PIN: 629302
- Nearest city: Nagercoil
- Lok Sabha constituency: Kanyakumari

Thovalai is a small village located in Kanyakumari district, Tamil Nadu, India. The area is well known in India for its production of flowers, especially jasmine. The taluk was among the four in Thiruvananthapuram district that with the passage of the States Reorganisation Act of 1956 were transferred from Thiruvananthapuram district, Travancore-Cochin State to the newly created Kanyakumari district of Madras State (the latter later renamed as Tamil Nadu State).

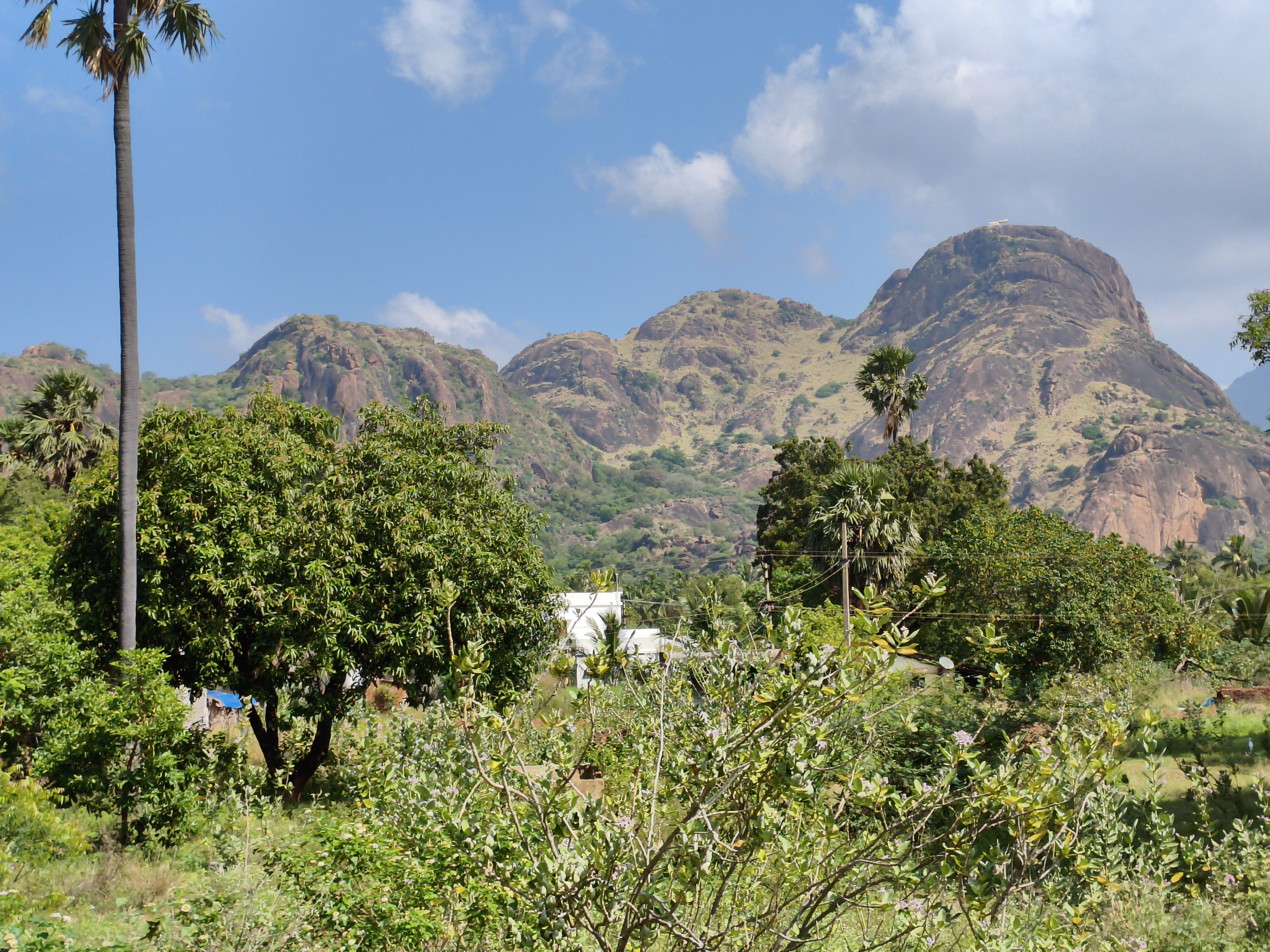
Hillock in Thovalai

== History ==
Thovala Taluk was part of the Princely state Travancore Kingdom, the latter which subsequently became part of the then Travancore-Cochin State. Part of The States Reorganisation Act of 1956 aligned state boundaries on linguistic affiliations. Thovala, Kalkulam, Vilavancode, and Agastheeswaram Taluks were transferred from Thiruvananthapuram District of the Travancore-Cochin State to Kanyakumari district, Madras State. Madras was later renamed as Tamil Nadu.

== Religions ==
Religions in Thovalai Taluka
Religion	Percent
Hindus	61.80%
Christians	31.71%
Muslims	6.19%
Others	0.31%

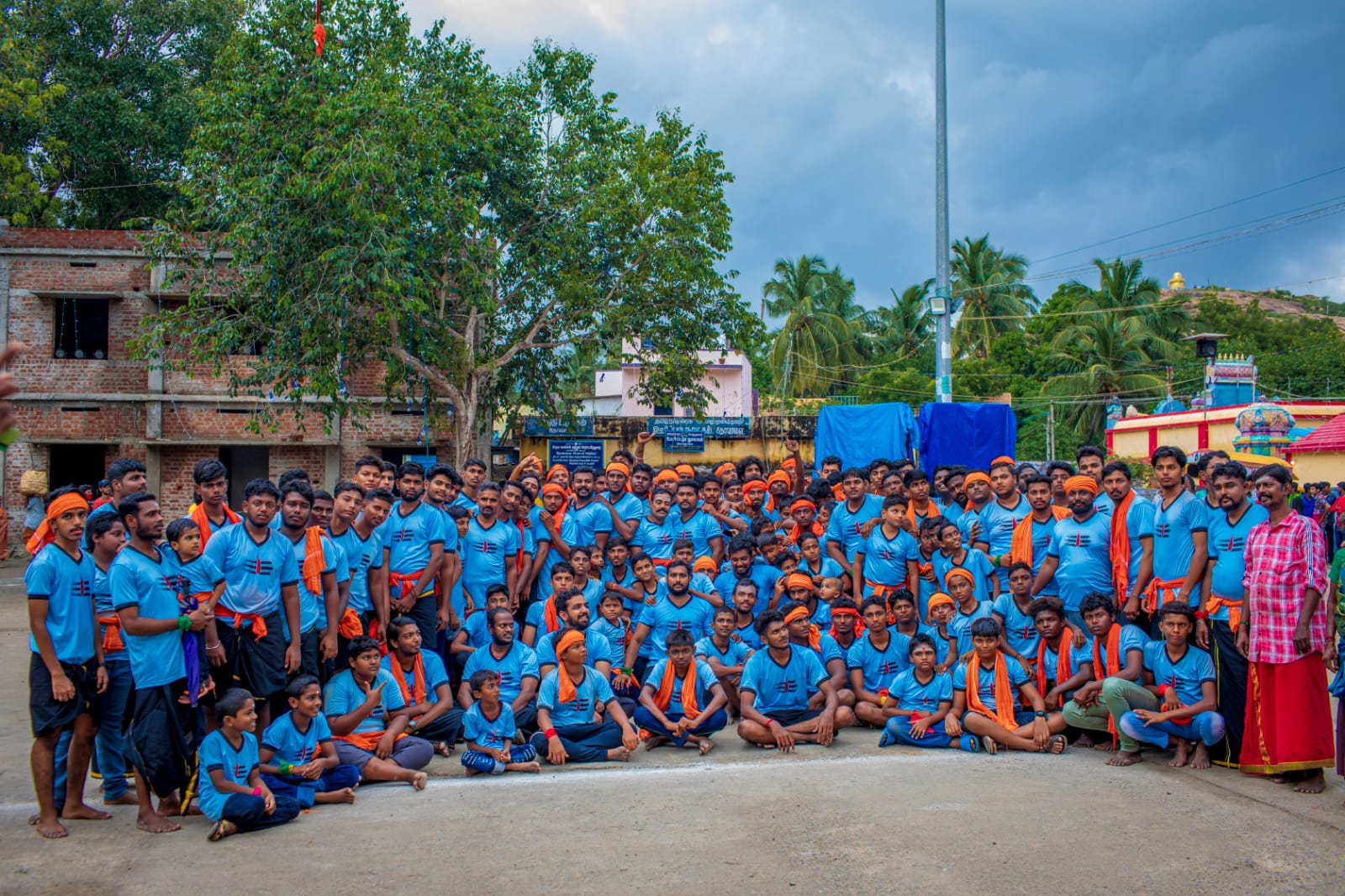

== Temples ==
=== Sree Mutharaman Thirukovil, Vadakoor Thovalai ===
This temple has as its main deity, goddess Mutharamman (முத்தாரம்மன்). This temple belongs to Vellalar (வெள்ளாளர் சமுதாயம்).

=== Thovalai Azhagiya Kanni Vinayagar Temple and Sree Mutharamman Temple ===
This temple has as its main god, Ganesha. It was built by Azhagiya Nambia Pillai. Thovalai sree Devi mutharamman koil temple krishnan puthoor this temple has as its near flower market.

=== Thovalai, Thevar Nager Arulmigu Madanthburan Thirukovil ===
This temple has as its main gods Varashakthi Vinayagar (வரசக்தி விநாயகர்), Madanthaburan (மாடன்தம்புரான்) and Eswari Amman (ஈஸ்வரி அம்மன்). The tem_{nlmmk}ple belongs to Mukkulathor (தேவர் சமுதாயம்)

=== Chekergiri Subramaniaswamy Thirukovil ===
One of the oldest temples in Thovalai.It is located above the mountain. This temple has its main god Murugan. The main function of this temple was Soorasamharam. It was the main and grand temple function in Thovalai. The function held on October or November month Every year.

=== Sree Mutharaman Thirukovil, Vadakoor Thovalai. ===
This temple has as its main deity, goddess Mutharamman (முத்தாரம்மன்). This temple belongs to Vellalar (வேளாளர் சமுதாயம்).

== Flower industry ==
Thovalai and the surrounding area is involved in the fresh flower industry for sale to domestic and foreign markets.

The variety of white Jasmine flower (locally called 'Pichchi Vellai' or 'Pichchip poo') is a rarity with a unique scent. It is somewhat similar to 'Jaathi Malligai' which is grown in regions of south India, such as the states of Tamil Nadu and Karnataka.

The village people are quite active throughout the day with the flower business. Especially, the ladies at home are employed in this work and earn a substantial income. This increases the economy of the whole family and also the confidence level of the women.

The Government of India is planning to set up a floriculture research station with a cold storage facility at Thovalai for the benefit of farmers raising flower crops in and around the Kanyakumari district. exporting flowers to foreign markets through Thiruvananthapuram in Kerala state.

== Infrastructure ==
- There is a higher secondary government school situated centrally with more than 5 acres (20,000 m^{2}) of ground.
- In Thovalai is the CSI Institute of Technology which was established in 1995 and is one of the oldest engineering colleges in Kanyakumari district.
- The Nagercoil-Thirunelveli passenger at 07.15 and Thirunelveli-Nagercoil passenger at 08.50 makes a stop in the village. The village is on the highway running between Nagercoil and Tirunelveli.
- Thovalai has a biggest flower market in kanyakumari district and in Tamilnadu and having Jasmine flower smell all over this area.
- There are many old temples in thovalai.
- Thovalai is the biggest flower market in Asia.
- It has an railway station with double electrified tracks.

== Famous functions ==
In Thovalai on a small hill in the middle of the village is where the well-known Subramanaian Temple can be found. At this temple, the Pushbabishekam festival is commonly celebrated at the middle of August. The temple at festival time is filled with all varieties of flowers. After one week of Diwali, Surasamharam festival is celebrated throughout Tamil Nadu including at this temple.

In Thovalai the oldest Chekkergiri murugan temple is located. Every year in October/NovemberSoorasamskaram is celebrated in a grand manner. This festival has been celebrated for more than 60 years.

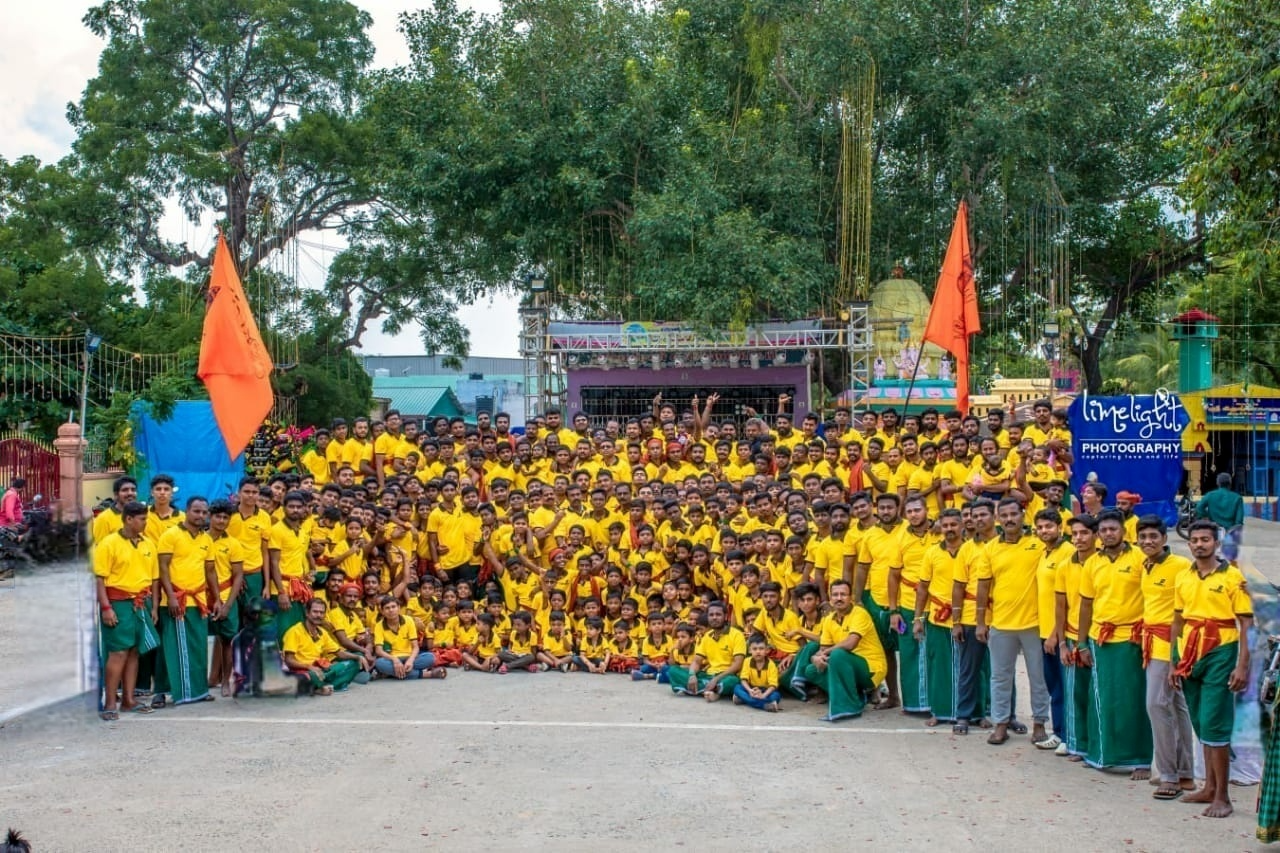

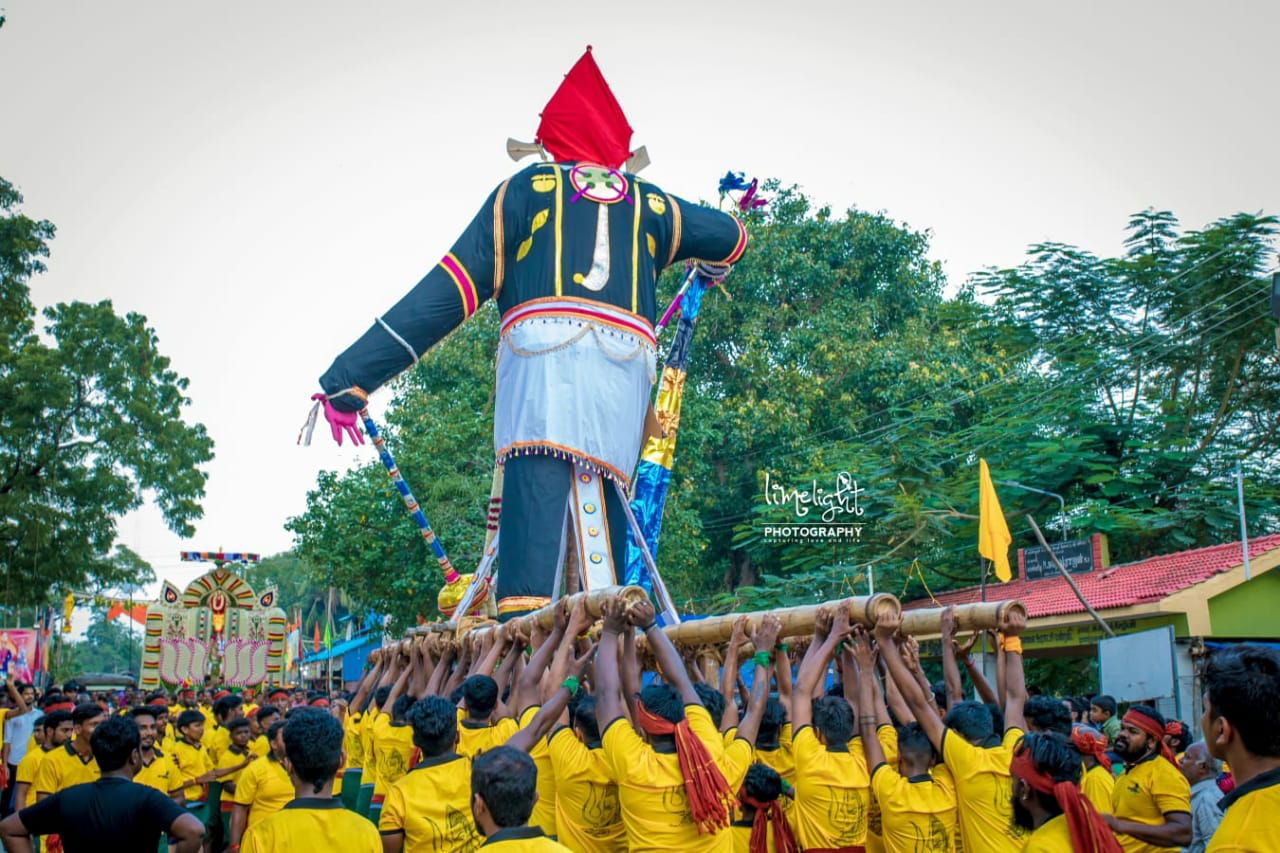
