= List of allusions in Marthandavarma novel =

The following is a list of allusions in Marthandavarma, the 1891 historical novel by C. V. Raman Pillai.

== Allusion to legends, history and politics ==
=== Events based on legends, history and politics ===
==== Treaty with Madura Nayaks ====
According to V. Nagam Aiya, during the reign of king Rama Varma besides the troubles caused by confederate chiefs and nobles such as Ettuveetiil Pillas and Madambies, the other petty chieftains were also refracted from contributing to the revenue of the state; and sovereign was unable to defend the atrocities of armed dacoits, as there were not enough money and manpower with the state. In Kollavarsham 901 king Rama Varma, headed to Tiruchirappalli and made a pact with the Madurai Nayaks to supply additional forces to Travancore for a fixed annual payment. T. K. Velu Pillai cites the references of payment to Madurai from Travancore. In the novel, it is presented that king Rama Varma and Thirumukhathu Pilla proceed to Tiruchirappalli in Kollavarsham 901 to arrange additional forces, which later camps at Boothapandi.

==== Lethal attempts on Marthanda Varma ====
===== Attempt at a Temple =====
In the novel, while Rama Varma and Thirumukhathu Pilla headed to Tiruchirappalli, prince Marthanda Varma and Ananthapadmanabhan were staying at Nagercoil, from where latter among the duo at Nagercoil heads to his mother's house following the news of her illness. While Ananthapadmanabhan was away, the prince was chased away by the men of Padmanabhan Thambi and an attempt on his life was made at Kalliyankattu temple. The incident is further referred as the escape of Marthanda Varma as a Brahmin. Dr. P. Venugopalan cites the references of the incident in the history of Travancore and Marthandamahathmyam Kilippattu. The incident took place at a temple of Shiva near to Kumarakovil (2 miles north to Thakkala), where Marthanda Varma took shelter while evading the attackers. At the temple Marthanda Varma was aided by the temple priest to escape in the outfit of the latter, and the priest was killed by the attackers as he was in the outfit of the former.

There are references in the novel about attempts on the life of Marthanda Varma by his enemies as his successful escapes through the groove at Panathara, the Ezhava house at Perunkadavila, and the Nedumangad fort.

===== Escape at an Ezhava house =====
According to the legends, after evading the Ettuveettil Pillas and their men at Dhanuvachapuram, (Note: Dhanuvachapuram is a village in Perumkadavila taluk of Thiruvananthapuram district.) Eithukondamkani, (Note: Eithukondamkani is a locality in Perumkadavila taluk of Thiruvananthapuram district.) and Marayamuttom, (Note: Marayamuttom is a village in Neyyattinkara taluk of Thiruvananthapuram district.) when Marthanda Varma was refreshing himself at a river near to Malakulangara (Note: Malakulangara is a locality in Perumkadavila taluk of Thiruvananthapuram district.) he was spotted by the men of Thambi brothers and in urgency to escape from them, he headed into a nearby Ezhava house, Alayil Puthur Veedu at Perumkadavila, where he was aided by the Kalipanikkathi (Lady Kali) to hide under the rattan enclosures. The men of Thambi brothers were unsuccessful in finding the prince.

===== Aid by a Channan and Hiding inside a tree =====
In the novel, while running away from Velu Kuruppu and his men, Marthanda Varma is helped by a mad Channan who hides him in a tree and misdirects his pursuers. According to Dr. P. Venugopalan, the above account of actions is a collaboration of two situations where Marthanda Varma escaped from the enemies. Once, when Marthanda Varma was returning after some confidential visits to Kanyakumari and Suchindram, he was tracked by the men of Ettuveettil Pillas and Thambi brothers. While running away from the chasers, he was suggested by a Channan plougher of the nearby field to hide inside the hollow statue of the elephant at the adjacent temple of Shasthavu. When the chasers reached the cultivation field and questioned the plougher, he misdirected them to the southern provinces. In another occasion, when Marthanda Varma was chased by the enemies, he evaded them by hiding inside the big hole within a jack tree at the Neyyattinkara Sree Krishna Swami Temple. The tree is still preserved at the temple compound and known as Ammacciplāvŭ (Mother jack tree).

==== Lethal attempt on Karthika Thirunal Rama Varma ====
The incident is referred as the attempt to murder the little prince, Karthika Thirunal Rama Varma and his mother by Ramanamadathil Pilla along with his men in Kollavarsham 903, while the mother-son duo were heading from Trivandrum to Attingal, but only to evade the attempt with the help of Kilimanoor Koithampuran (Lord of Kilimanoor), who led the duo to a nearby safe village and took their place in the palanquin en route, confronted the attackers and eventually got killed, as described in the History of Travancore from the Earliest Times by P. Shangoony Menon. The above account of incident is in conflict with the version described by Pachumuthathu in the Tiruvitāṁkūṟ Caritraṁ, (Note: First published history of Travancore (in Malayalam) written by Pachu Moothathu in 1867.) which recounts the same at Budhanoor (Note: Budhanoor is a village in Chengannur taluk of Alappuzha district.) in the then district of Chengannur, where ruffians from Kayamkulam did the attack and states that lord of Kilimanoor who defended the attackers was the husband of the Queen. V. Nagam Aiya states the incident inline with the version by P. Shangoony Menon and mentions that lord of Kilimanoor, Kerala Varma Koithampuran as the consort of the Queen. T. K. Velu Pillai supports the version of Pachumuthathu and condemns the version by P. Shangoony Menon; which is cited by Dr. A. P. Ibrahim Kunju, who points out the deliberation of T. K. Velu Pillai in supporting the version of Pachumuthathu by purposefully avoiding the references of incident in the British records, Letters to Tellicherry (Note: Letters to Tellicherry are records of Madras Presidency published as one of the series among Records of Fort St. George in 12 Volumes by the Superintendent of Government Press, Madras in 1934.).

==== Heirship claim by Thambi brothers ====
Dr. A. P. Ibrahim Kunju refers to the legend that Thambi brothers made a claim to the throne of Venad during the final period of king Rama Varma as they were the linear descendants, which was against the tradition of collateral descent through maternal nephew followed by the Venad kingdom in selecting the heir to the throne. P. K. Parameswaran Nair claims that there is a legend in which Rama Varma promises to his spouse, Abhirama to let the children she will bear, to ascend to the throne of Venad; however Dr. P. Venugopalan states that the above account of legend is not valid as Rama Varma was neither the king nor the next heir to the throne during the early days of his relationship with his spouse and he ruled the kingdom only in the last five years of his life. P. Shangoony Menon and V. Nagam Aiya state that Thambi brothers were persuaded by feudatory chiefs and nobles, Ettuveettil Pillas and Madambies to make the claim to the throne. Dewan Nanoo Pillay states that Thambi duo manifested the claim, as they felt degraded from the royal rank after the accession of Marthanda Varma, so Madambies and Ettuveettil Pillas fomented their disaffection. T. K. Velu Pillai states that Thambi brothers attempted to seize the throne for themselves against the custom of Marumakkattāyaṁ (collateral descent through maternal nephews). Even though the above claim and dispute happened after the demise of Rama Varma, in the novel, it is presented that the conspiracy by Thambi brothers were started long before the king was ill and also shows that Padmanabhan Thambi and Sundarayyan lay the plans against Marthanda Varma, to get him deprived from the line of succession. In the novel, it is mentioned that Ettuveettil Pillas gave assurance to Padmanabhan Thambi that they will make him king after the period of king Rama Varma. In the novel, it is also referred that Padmanabhan Thambi did not want to emphasize on Makkattāyaṁ (lineal descent through sons) by raising the concern to Sundarayyan that such a succession may bring his younger brother Raman Thambi against him.

==== Treaty of Thambi brothers with foreign forces ====
The heirship claim of the Thambi brothers against the then existing custom in Venad led them to seek the aid of foreign forces to confront Marthanda Varma. According to P. Shangoony Menon the elder Thambi brother, Papu Thamby went to Tiruchirapalli in Kollavarsham 905 (1730) to seek aid from Pandyan governor. V. Nagam Aiya states that the Thambi brothers went together to Tiruchirapalli in 1729 to seek aid from Pandyan governor. According to Dewan Nanoo Pillai, only one of the Thambi brothers proceeded to Tiruchirapalli in Kollavarsham 905 (1729-1730). T. K. Velu Pillai mentions that the Thambi brothers secured the mercenary services of a foreign contingent in Kollavarsham 905. In the novel, the younger brother, Raman Thambi goes to Nanjinadu to arrange for additional forces in Kollavarsham 903.

==== Council of Ettuveettil Pillas ====
Ettuveettil Pillas formed a council at the convention area of an inn at Venganoor, where they held consultation about the plans against the king Marthanda Varma and, the members resolved to assassinate the king on the Aaraattu festival day during his procession. The decision was scripted as palm leaf notes and hidden in the footwears of messengers. According to P. Shangoony Menon and V. Nagam Aiya, the conference happened sometime after Kollavarsham 906. Dr. A. P. Ibrahim Kunju states that above event as happened in Kollavarsham 912. The messengers with the council notes were later detained by the king's men following the lead by a Paṇṭāraṁ (keeper of the inn), who spied on the council members and eventually the plan was foiled. In the novel, the council of Ettuveettil Pillas is convened at the maternal house of Kudamon Pilla near to Andiyirakkam. The council passes the resolution to assassinate the prince Marthanda Varma after the demise of king Rama Varma, when the prince will be heading back after the last rites of the then deceased King. A council note of the same is prepared for Padmanabhan Thambi and entrusts the same to Sundarayyan, who on the way back puts up a fight with Ananthapadmanabhan disguised as a beggar, who tries to snatch the council note and, eventually the note is lost in the Killiyar. In the novel the above events are shown as happened in Kollavarsham 903 before the accession of Marthanda Varma.

==== Coup attempt by Thambi brothers ====
When the foreign contingent arrived under Azhagappa Mudaliyar as an aid to Thambi brothers from Pandyan governor, the Thambi duo joins them at the Nanjinadu camp to mobilize the forces; meanwhile Marthanda Varma tried to arrange necessary counter forces at Kalkulam, however as there were not enough forces to confront the contingent and men of Thambi duo, Marthanda Varma negotiated with the officers of Azhagappa Mudaliyar, lieutenant Kanimiyavu and captain Kapalipara Sokkalingam Pillai, thus secured a safe passage out of Kalkulam fort with an escort to Neyyattinkara, in order to go to Perakathavazhi at Kollam; en route, on realizing that the little prince Karthika Thirunal Rama Varma and his royal mother at Puthenkotta (Note: Puthenkotta is a locality between Attakulangara and Karamana in Thiruvananthapuram city.) were about to be attacked by a team led by Kudamon Pilla, Karakulathu Pilla and Vanchikoottathu Pilla, Marthanda Varma rushed there and moved the mother-son duo to Attingal and headed to Kollam. Meanwhile, the team led by Azhagappa Mudaliyar and Thambi brothers started from Kalkulam to Thiruvananthapuram, where they tried to take the possession of treasure at Sree Padmanabha Swamy temple, but only to foil the plans by the local inhabitants, to whom the charge was entrusted by Vanchikoottathu Pilla before he moved from there. The protests by local people made the team of Thambi brothers to retract, so Azhagappa Mudaliyar and forces headed to eastern provinces. Mathilakam Records (Note: Matilakaṁ Grantavari or Mathilakam Records are palm leaf scrolls (churunas or curuṇakaḷ) with information about Sree Padmanabha Swamy temple and the kingdom of erstwhile Travancore, written in ancient scripts of Kerala such as Vattezhuthu, Kolezhuthu, besidesTamil and Malayalam as royal orders (neettu or nīṭṭŭ), land records (ozhuku or oḻukŭ), treasury notices, taxation records, court proceedings, boundary disputes etc.) mentions the above account of events as happened in Kollavarsham 905, one year after the demise of king Rama Varma. In the novel, it is presented that the foreign forces, the forces from Nanjinadu are led by Raman Thambi. The men of Thambi brothers and Ettuveettil Pillas together plan to siege the palace to slay the prince, however prince Marthanda Varma evade the coup as he is timely tipped by Subhadra, who also insists to move the little prince and the mother to a safe place. When the team led by Thambi brothers and Ettuveettil Pillas are unsuccessful in locating Marthanda Varma and little prince, they head to Manacaud. The above course of events is shown in the novel as happened five days after the demise of king Rama Varma.

==== Accession of Marthanda Varma ====
P. Shangoony Menon and V. Nagam Aiya state that Marthanda Varma ascended to the throne in Kollavarsham 904 (1729). Mathilakam Records refers the accession of Marthanda Varma as happened on or before the month of Ani (June–July) in Kollavarsham 904 (1729). T. K. Velu Pillai mentions the commencement of Marthanda Varma's reign in Kollavarsham 905. A. P. Ibrahim Kunju mentions that the accession happened in Kollavarsham 905. In the novel, the accession of Marthanda Varma is shown as happened two weeks after the demise of king Rama Varma in Kollavarsham 904.

==== Illness and demise of king Rama Varma ====
According to P. Shangoony Menon, king Rama Varma died of short illness in Kollavarsham 903 (1728). V. Nagam Aiya also states that king Rama Varma died in the year 1728. Dr. A. P. Ibrahim Kunju mentions that king Rama Varma died in Kollavarsham 904 (January 1729) referring to the Mathilakam Records. In the novel, king Rama Varma is bed ridden due to illness during Kollavarsham 903 and dies in the course of story. According to Prof. N. Krishna Pillai and Prof. V. Anandakuttan Nair, the demise of king Rama Varma mentioned in the novel falls in the timeline of Kollavarsham 904.

==== Detention of Arumukham Pillai ====
Dalawa Arumukham Pilla was once detained by foreign forces camped at Thrikkanamkudi, (Note: Thirukannangudi is a sub-locality, in the Thirukkurungudi locality of Tirunelveli district.) because the payment for them as per the agreement with the king Rama Varma was in arrears. The required payment was almost done through the merchants at Kottar, however Dalawa was not released and the release was accomplished by the then commander-in-chief, Kumarswami Pillai. According to P. Shangoony Menon and T. K. Velu Pillai, the detention and release happened post the accession of Marthanda Varma. In the novel, Arumukham Pilla is detained by Madura forces at Boothapandi and possible payments are arranged through loans from Kottar; the events are presented as happened before the accession of Marthanda Varma and the remaining amount required is provided by Subhadra to Marthanda Varma to facilitate the release.

==== Conquest of Desiganadu ====
Marthanda Varma marched to Desinganadu in Kollavarsham 906 because the king of Desinganadu invaded and conquered the eastern portions of Kallada, which was under Venad. In the novel, the conquest of Desinganadu is referred as happened in Kollavarsham 906 with the direct involvement of king Marthanda Varma, to whom Ananthapadmanabhan was the main protector in the conquest.

==== Other events ====
The first edition of the novel mentions that Padmanabhan Thambi is killed by Marthanda Varma's accomplices in a precognitive narration, which is removed from the further editions. According to P. Shangoony Menon and V. Nagam Aiya, Pappu Thambi was killed at Nagercoil palace by the guards of Marthanda Varma, which the former records as happened in Kollavarsham 908 and the latter mentions that it happened a few months after the Arattu festival at Sree Padmanabhaswamy Temple in 1732.

The novel refers the Kalipankulam incident, which according to P. Shangoony Menon and V. Nagam Aiya was that the five princes who were the offspring of Umayamma Rani were murdered by men of confederates (Madampimar). T. K. Velu Pillai points that Umayamma Rani never had any children. In the novel, the tragedy at Kalipankulam is mentioned only as the massacre of five princes without giving any reference to Umayamma Rani, but refers the involvement of Ramanamadathil Pilla in the incident. The novel also refers to the attack of a Mukilan during when, a few families were converted as Mohammedians after circumcision; which implies the conquest of Mukilan (a petty chieftain under Moghul emperor) in Travancore during Kollavarsham 853–855, followed by the circumcision and proselytization of Nair family members to Islam.

There is a reference to the tragedy of Iravikutti Pilla, who was the commander-in-chief during the period of Unni Kerala Varma (Kollavarsham 806–823). Iravikutti Pilla was killed by the forces of Thirumalai Nayak in the battle, to which he headed by ignoring the bad omens. In the novel, Kazhakoottathu Pilla refers to the establishment of twenty-four Śāstākkanmāṟ (deities with the divine aspects of Shasthavu) at the downhills in Kerala for protection, which implies the legend about Parashurama, who did the enshrinements of Shasthavu deity at various places in Kerala.

== Architectural and geographical references ==
=== Kingdom of Venad ===
Venad is the kingdom in which the events of novel take place; in the novel, the king Rama Varma is referred as the ruler of Venad. The areas of Venad that are mentioned in the novel are as follows:

- Aralvaimozhi – Aralvaimozhi or Aruvamozhi or Aramboly is referred as Āṟāṁvaḻi, the south-eastern border of Venad, through which the traitorous criminals are exiled from the kingdom.
- Edava – Edava or Idava is the north-western boundary of Venad, through which Sundarayyan proposes to exile the people of Channar clan.

==== Padmanabhapuram area ====
- Padmanabhapuram – The novel describes Padmanabhapuram as an earlier capital of Thiruvithamkodu state, and the locality is maintained as a royal adobe.
  - Padmanabhapuram palace – According to M. G. Sasibooshan, only the Darbhakulam mansion and the Kalkulam mansion were existed during the timeline of novel. The novel presents only the residence existed at the place of present southern mansion on the northern side of the contemporary palace. Prince Marthada Varma halts there on his way to Boothapandi and later Padmanabhan Thambi camps there, after which fifty numbers of Channar people were executed at the palace compound.
  - Charottu palace – Charottu palace is a royal residence existed at Charode, which is a locality near to Padmanabhapuram. According to Dr. P. Venugopalan, Charottu palace existed 2 miles (3.218688 km) north to Padmanabhapuram palace. The novel describes the Charottu palace as a small one which consists of a quadrangular homestead (Nalukettu) and a cookhouse (Madapalli) surrounded by a compound wall with doors on the eastern and southern portions. The prince Marthanda Varma and his aide Parameswaran Pilla reside here after evading from Padmanabhan Thambi at Padmanabhapuram palace through the tunnel passage.
  - Dungeon and underground passage – The novel states about the dungeon existed within the Padmanabhapuram palace compound. The dungeon is described to have a room twenty feet below the ground level; where the mad Channan is locked up. The dungeon also leads to a tunnel, which further goes down from the floor level of the dungeon and the passage leads to an upward stair that lead to the door to a small room. The door on the roof of the small room opens to a room inside of Charottu palace. Dr. P. Venugopalan states that the closed tunnel passage between Padmanabhapuram palace and Charottu palace had access from the Tāikoṭṭāraṁ (Mother's mansion) at the former palace, and cites its closed existence.
- Mangoikkal house – Mangoikkal house in the novel is described to be 2 Nazhika north to Charode, and the road to Padmanabhapuram exists on its northern side. The southern side of the house is a grove, from where at a half Nazhika distance is a thicket, through which mad Channan reaches Mangoikkal house to rescue the prince Marthanda Varma. The novel also mentions that the Mangoikkal kalari (martial arts school of Mangoikkal) is nearby and from where the men came to aid Mangoikkal Kuruppu and his nephews. The house name Mangoikkal is in reminiscence of house of Mangottu Assan at Mancode, a village in Vilavancode taluk of Kanniyakumari district, and the house name of author's patron Kesavan Thambi Karyakkar, Nangoikkal.
- Veli hill – The novel refers to Veli hill or Vēḷimala as the site on to prince Marthnda Varma stares while being at Charottu palace. Padmanabhan Thambi mentions that he will fix lights on top of the Veli hill. Vēḷimala described in the novel is located in Thovalai taluk and Kalkulam taluk of Kanniyakumari district.
- Boothapandi – The novel refers to Boothapandi as the place where the mercenary forces from Madurai are camped and at the camp Dalawa Arumukham Pilla is being detained due to the incomplete payment of arrears to the mercenaries.
- Kalkulam – Kalkulam is referred in novel as one of the places nearer to Padmanabhapuram and the people here are unhappy about the change of the capital to Thiruvananthapuram.
- Nagercoil – The novel mentions Nagercoil while mentioning about the female deposer from Kottar, and about the location of stay of Marthanda Varma while king Rama Varma heads to Tiruchirappalli in Kollavarsham 901.
  - Nagercoil palace – The novel mentions that prince Marthanda Varma and Ananthapadmanabhan were staying at Nagercoil in Kollovarsham 901, implying their stay at Nagercoil palace, which is an adobe of Venad royal family. The novel also mentions that Padmanabhan Thambi is killed by Marthanda Varma's accomplices in a precognitive narration, statement about which is available only in the first (1891) edition of the novel. Nagercoil palace is located at 8°10′45.7″N 77°25′27.1″E and being used as a Revenue Division office under the collectorate of Kanyakumari district.
  - Kottar – Kottar is referred in the novel as a locality near to Nagercoil and as the domicile of female deposer, who testified against the prince Marthanda Varma in the inquiry about the missing of Ananthapadmanabhan. The novel also mentions that money for the payment against arrears to the mercenaries from Madurai is facilitated through a loan from the merchants at Kottar.
- Kalliancaud – The novel refers Kalliancaud or Kalliyankadu as the place to where prince Marthanda Varma is chased away by Velu Kuruppu and team while Ananthapadmanabhan is headed to his mother's residence in Kollavarsham 901. Kalliancaud is a locality in the Agastheeswaram taluk of Kanyakumari district.
  - Kalliancaud temple – The novel mentions that prince Marthanda Varma is cornered and trapped at Kalliancaud temple or Kaḷḷiyankāṭṭukṣētraṁ, from where, he is later escaped as a Brahmin. The temple is Kalliancaud Sivan Kovil, located at 8°11′52″N 77°23′27″E.
- Panchavankadu – The novel mentions Panchavankadu or Panchavan forest as the place where Ananthapadmanabhan is attacked and left for dead by Velu Kuruppu and his team. It is only described that the forest area is on the way to Nagercoil from the residence of Ananthapadmanbhan's mother and is nearer to the place where the Pathans, Hakkim and his group camped in Kollavarsham 901. Prof. N. Krishna Pilla and Prof. V. Anandakuttan Nair state that Panchavankadu and Kalliyankadu are the same.
- Thiruvithamcode – The novel refers to Tiruvitāṁkōṭŭ as one of the places near to Padmanabhapuram and Tiruvitānkōṭŭ as the earlier capital of Venad kingdom. The second edition of novel (1911) states that Padmanabhapuram was earlier the capital of Tiruvitāṁkōṭŭ state; which, according to Dr. P. Venugopalan is a slip up happened in revising the first edition (1891) of the novel. Thiruvithamkodu was the capital of Venad when the capital was changed from Kollam until the same was changed to Padmanabhapuram. Thiruvithamcode and Thiruvithankodu are panchayat town and revenue village respectively in the Kalkulam taluk of Kanyakumari district.
- Keralapuram – The novel refers Keralapuram as a locality on the route from Charottu palace to Thiruvananthapuram, that is to be followed by Marthanda Varma and Parameswaran Pilla. Keralapuram is a locality in the Kalkulam taluk of Kanyakumari district.
- Eraniel – The novel refers to Eraniel as one of the places nearer to Padmanabhapuram and the local residents there are unhappy about the shifting of capital to Thiruvananthapuram.
  - Eraniel palace – The novel implicitly refers Eraniel Palace as the place to where Marthanda Varma will be heading to raise the sword after the post-funeral rituals of the then late king. Eraniel palace is located at 8°12′29″N 77°19′4″E.

==== Other southern provinces ====
- Vilavancode – The novel refers to Vilavancode as one of the places near to Padmanabhapuram and the people there are unhappy about the change of capital to Thiruvananthapuram. Vilavancode is a village in the Vilavancode taluk of Kanyakumari district.
- Perumkadavila – Perumkadavila is referred as place where at a house prince Marthanda Varma evades the attempt on his life by Velu Kuruppu and team. Perumkadavila is a village in the Neyyattinkara taluk of Thiruvananthapuram district.
- Chulliyur – Chulliyur is referred as Chulliyil and mentioned along with character Chadachi Marthandan. Chulliyur is a locality in the Perumkadavila Panchayat in the Neyyattinkara taluk of Thiruvananthapuram district.
- Neyyattinkara – In the novel, Neyyattinkara is mentioned as Neyyāṯunkara and referred as one of the northern provinces in Venad. Neyyattinkara is a municipality in the Neyyattinkara taluk of Thiruvananthapuram district.
- Venganoor – Venganoor is mentioned as one of places between Thiruvananthapuram and southern provinces of Venad. After arranging five servants to accompany Marthanda Varma, Subhadra advises the prince and his accomplices to cross Venganoor by the night itself.
- Pallichal – The novel refers to Pallichal as one of the places lies in between Thiruvananthapuram and the southern provinces of Venad. Pallichal is a village in the Neyyattinkara taluk of Thiruvananthapuram district.

==== Thiruvananthapuram areas ====
- Thiruvananthapuram – Thiruvananthapuram is referred as the capital of the kingdom during the timeline of the novel. Dr. P. Venugopalan points that this is historically inaccurate as the capital was not changed from Padmanabhapuram to Thiruvananthapuram during the period.
  - Thiruvananthapuram fort – The novel mentions about the Thiruvananthapuram fort while referring to the theft happened at the Chembakassery house. The fort existed during the timeline of the novel was later rebuilt during Kollavarsham 922–928 and eventually demolished post the independence of India; a few remains of which are existed at the east fort in Thiruvananthapuram as property of Archeology department.
    - Thiruvananthapuram palace – The palace of reigning king within the fort premises. The novel mentions that the king Rama Varma is bed ridden here.
    - Thekkekoyikkal – Thekkekoyikkal or the southern mansion is the residence of prince Marthanda Varma within the fort premises. In the novel, it is presented that Velu Kuruppu tried to attack Marthada Varma, while the latter is on his way to the mansion, but attempt is foiled by the intervention of Shankarachar.
    - Sree Padmanabhaswamy Temple – The novel states that the western side of the Sree Padmanabhaswamy Temple are occupied by Brahmins and Nairs only during the timeline of the novel.
    - Mithrananthapuram Temple – Mithrananthapuram Trimurti Temple or Mitṟāṉantapuraṁ Kṣētraṁ is referred in the novel as on the pathway that leads to Chembakassery house.
    - Ananthankadu – The novel refers to Ananthankadu or Ananthan forest that a few remaining trees of the forest prevails near Sree Padmanabhaswamy Temple and are worshiped. Pachu Muthathu mentions the legend about the vaishnavite saint Divakar from Tulunadu who gathered the local Brahmins to plan and build a temple of Vishnu at Ananthankadu after the saint had a divine revelation in 224 AD, which led to the establishment of Sree Padmanabhaswamy temple at the Ananthankadu.
    - Chembakassery house – In the novel, it is mentioned that Chembakassery house existed to the south-western side of the pathway to the Mithranandapuram temple from Sree Padmanabhaswamy temple. P. K. Parameswaran Nair assumes that Chembakassery house was never existed, but Mr. Parthan from Thiruvananthapuram states that the house existed and the author C. V. Raman Pillai was familiar with the same.
  - Sreevaraham – Sreevaraham is mentioned as one of the places which is not overlaid with roads. Sreevaraham is a locality in Thiruvananthapuram city near Puthen street and Nandini gardens.
  - Perunthanni – Perunthanni is mentioned as one of the places which is not overlaid with roads.
  - Palkulangara – Palkulangara is mentioned as one of the places which is not overlaid with roads. Palkulangara is a locality in Thiruvananthapuram city near Kaithamukku and Pazhavangadi.
  - Valiyanalukettu – Valiyanalukettu or the quadrangular edifice is the residence of Padmanabhan Thambi at Thiruvananthapuram.
  - Chenthikadu – The novel refers to Chenthikadu as the thicket on the north-western side of pathway from Subhadra's house to Valiyanalukettu. C. V. Vyakhyanakosam (Note: C. V. Vyakhyanakosham is a lexicographic work in four volumes published by C. V. Raman Pillai National Foundation during 1994–2004, comprising explanations and interpretations of words, phrases, idioms used by C. V. Raman Pillai in his literary works, four novels and nine farces, which include Marthandavarma.) states Chenthikadu as the forest at Chenthitta, which is a locality between Aryasala and Thampanoor near Sreevaraham in Thiruvananthapuram city.
  - Nedumcaud – The novel refers to Nedumcaud as the thicket on the south-eastern side of pathway from Subhadra's house to Valiyanalukettu. Nedumcaud or Nedungad or Nedumkadu is a locality between Killipalam and Karamana in Thiruvananthapuram city.
  - Andiyirakkam – In the novel, Andiyirakkam is referred as a locality 1 Nazhika east to Sree Padmanabhaswamy temple. Andiyirakkam is a locality near to Karamana in the Thiruvananthapuram city.
  - Subhadra's house – Subhadra's house is mentioned to be a few blocks north to the royal passage at Andiyirakkam.
  - Shankarachar's house – Shankarachar's house is located at the western area after the plantain plantations on the western side of the Subhadra's house.
  - Kizhakkeveedu – The house of Anantham situated on the eastern side of the royal passage that passes through Andiyirakkam.
  - Sree Pandarathu Veedu – Sree Pandarathu Veedu or the Sree Pandarathu house is a residence of Kazhakkoottathu Pilla in the Thiruvananthapuram area, where Mangoikkal Kuruppu was detained earlier. The novel presents that the house is in the same vicinity as that of Subadra's house, from where Ananthapadmanabhan heads to rescue Mangoikkal Kuruppu from the former house.
  - Killi river – In the novel, it is mentioned that the pathway from Subhadra's house to Valiyanalukettu through the royal street that crosses over the Killi river and on its over-bridge Sundarayyan and Ananthapadmanbhan fight to fall into the river.
  - Karamana river – The novel mentions that the Aruveettukar and men who came in support to Marthanda Varma are camped at the western banks of the Karamana river.
  - Panathura – Panathura is mentioned as Panathara, where the prince Marthanda Varma escapes the attempt on his life by Velu Kuruppu and team. Panathura or Panathara is a coastal area between Vazhamuttom and Pachaloor in Thiruvananthapuram district.
  - Aranoor – Aranoor is referred as a cultivation field located between the pathway from Subhadra's house to Valiyanalukettu and Manacaud. Aranoor is a locality on the eastern area between Killipalam and Karamana in the Thiruvananthapuram city.
  - Manacaud – Manacaud or Manakadu is referred in the novel as the place where Pathan merchants are camped. Fighters of Mangoikkal also camp there, where their final confrontation with Thambi brothers and Ettuveettil Pillas take place.

==== Northern provinces ====
- Chirayinkeezhu – Chirayinkeezhu is referred as one of areas between Thiruvananthapuram and the northern provinces of Venad where the rule of Ettuveettil Pillas are in force.
- Chempazhanthy – Chempazhanthy is referred as one of the northern provinces of Venad.
- Kazhakkoottam – In the novel, Kazhakkoottam is referred as one of the northern provinces of Venad.
- Pallippuram – In the novel, as part of the preparations for the reception of Padmanabhan Thambi at Chembakassery, betel leaves that are tender are brought from Pallippuram.

=== Foreign areas and kingdoms ===
- Nanjinadu – Nanjinadu is referred as the nearby state on the southern side of Venad. Nanjinadu or Nanchinadu or Nāñcināṭŭ is considered to be southern region of India constituting the regions of Agasteeswaram taluk, Thovalai taluk of Kanyakumari district and a region of yesteryear Tenpāṇṭi (southern Pandya kingdom) in the Tirunelveli district.
- Kanyakumari – The novel refers to Kanyakumari north to where, superstitious customs are prevailed in South India.
- Pandya Desam – The novel mentions that the Pathan merchants came to Venad from Pandya Desam or Pāṇṭyadēśaṁ or the Land of Pandyas.
- Desinganadu – Desinganadu is referred a country on the northern side of Venad; to where Marthanda Varma marches during his conquests in Kollavarsham 906. It is also presented as one of regions where Padmanabhan Thambi is known for his fame.
- Chembakassery – In the novel, Chembakassery is mentioned as an outside region where Padmanabhan Thambi is known for his fame.
- Kozhikode – Kozhikode is mentioned as one of the regions where Padmanabhan Thambi is known for his fame.
- Kancheepuram – The novel refers to Kancheepuram, where the traditional medicine practitioners consider Hakkim as equival to Vagbhata for his medical excellency.
- Arcot – Arcot is mentioned as one of the regions where Padmanabhan Thambi is known for his fame.
- Tiruchirappalli – The novel mentions that king Rama Varma and Thirumukhathu Pilla head to Tiruchirappalli or Thrissinapally to make alliance with Madurai Nayaks and avail additional forces. Tiruchirappalli is also mentioned as one of the regions where Padmanabhan Thambi is known for his fame.
- Madurai – Madurai is mentioned as one of the regions where Padmanabhan Thambi is known for his fame.
- Thanjavur – The first edition of the novel refers to Thanjavur, from where Sundarayyan suggests bringing beautiful courtesans for Padmanabhan Thambi.
- Pazhoor Padippura – The novel refers Pazhoor Padippura as Pazhur when Parameswaran Pilla implies astrological practices there.
- Gokarna – In the novel, Kazhakkoottathu Pilla states that the collateral system of succession is followed by people in the areas between Gokarna and Kanyakumari.
- Kasi – In the novel, Parameswaran Pilla points that Kalakutty also left when Marthanda Varma headed to eastern provinces and the former did not go to Kasi or Madurai.

=== Allied areas and kingdoms ===
- Nedumangad – Nedumangad is referred as one of the places where prince Marthanda Varma evaded the attempt on his life by Velu Kuruppu and men. Nedumangad was the base of Pērakatāvaḻi or Perakathavazhi, a branch of Thirupappur Swaroopam (one of the royal households of Venad) and got annexed to Travancore in 1742.
  - Nedumangad fort – In the novel, it is mentioned that prince Marthanda Varma escaped through one of the houses within the fort at Nedumangad.
- Kilimanoor – In the novel, it is mentioned that the royal servant Narayanayyan leads a force through sea route from Kilimanoor.
  - Kilimanoor palace – The novel mentions that prince Marthanda Varma sends his emissary to Kilimanoor palace or Kilimanoor Kovilakam asking for help.

Other references

- Kerala – In the novel, Hakkim refers to Kerala and remarks that the place is like heaven.
- Travancore – Novel refers to Travancore as Tiruvitāṁkūṟ in precognitive narrations and also as an outside province in the flashback narrations eight years before the timeline of the novel about the search for the then absconding husband of Subhadra.
- Utsavamadam – The novel mentions Utsavamadam or Ulsavamaṭhaṁ as an eatery existed in Thiruvananthapuram locality during the lifetime of the author, C. V. Raman Pillai.

=== Foreign areas outside India ===
- Mecca – The novel refers to Mecca, where Hakkim wants to have his final moments.
- Red Sea – In the novel Hakkim proposes to dumb the ideals of Nuradeen into Red Sea when the latter voice against compelling Shamsudeen to marry Zulaikha.
- Mount Sinai – In the novel, Hakkim says that his mind is strong as the rocks on Mount Sinai, which is referred as saināyi mountain.

== Allusion to medicine, sociocultural system and lifestyle practices ==
=== Medicine practices ===
The novel presents that practices of Indian traditional medicine and Unani traditional medicine were prevailed in Venad during the timeline of the story.

  - Indian traditional medicine – In the novel, when king Rama Varma was ill, the traditional medicine practitioners at the palace provided the initial treatment. Parukutty is also treated primarily by the traditional medicine practitioners at Chembakassery.
  - Unani traditional medicine – The novel mentions that treatment by Hakkim brought Ananthapadmanabhan back to life. Hakkim also provides medicine for king Rama Varma and Parukutty, among whom the latter gets fully recovered. B. K. Menon states that the traditional medicine practiced by Hakkim is Unani.
  - Narcoanalysis – The novel states that Hakkim tried a kind of narcoanalysis on Ananthapadmanabhan after getting him drugged, to know the whereabouts of the latter however it did not yield any results.

=== Sociocultural system ===
- Religious references – The novel refers to the ideology of single god in Islam while describing about Hakkim. In the novel, it is described that Parukutty observes fasting on Mondays, a Hindu religious practice, pertaining to which she also does the Ramayana recitation. In the novel, Hakkim considers prince Marthanda Varma as equal to Mūsa, the Islamic version of Moses, and compares the intellect of Shamsudeen to that of the devil influenced mind of Owa, the Islamic version of Eve. The novel also refers to Quran, from which Hakkim cites one hundred statements while agreeing to head to Tiruvitaṁkōṭu town. Nuradeen remarks that Zulaikha took care of the wounded Shamsudeen as she was following the principles of Mahānibi or the great Nabi, the prophet Mohammed.
- Proselytism – The novel presents Beeram Khan as a converted Muslim, who was a Nair and ex-spouse of Subhadra, about whom he realizes as an uttamastrī (faithful woman); however his intuition does not allow him to break his relationship with Fathima, whom he married after proselytization to Islam, as he became a dependent of the Hakkim's family. In the novel, Hakkim wants Ananthapadmanabhan as Shamsudeen to get converted to Islam and marry Zulaikha, to whom the latter confesses his dislike against proselytization which makes her to love him more than earlier during when, at one point of time Hakkim intended to proselytize Ananthapadmanabhan to Islam with the support of Usman Khan while the latter was unconscious as being drugged, but could not do so because Zulaikha opposed the act.
- Astrology – In the novel, Parameswaran Pilla jestingly says to Marthanda Varma that they could go to Pazhur, one of the centers of astrological practices in order to identify the unrecognized pedestrian passed by them at night.
  - Praśṉaṁ Vaypŭ – In the novel, Anantham says that Praśṉaṁ Vaypŭ or Prashnam Vaypu as Peraśanaṁ, which could be either of the acts that Kodanki did for the precognitive results to please Padmanabhan Thambi. Prashnam Vaypu is one of the astrological services that prevails in Kerala. (Note: An astrological practice that prevails in Kerala; in which specially selected conch shells are used for conclusions based on zodiacal positions.)
  - Natal astrology – In the novel, Shanku Assan says to Parukutty that chothirisham or jyothisham will not go wrong as his late father while writing natal astrological notes on her, found that she will have difficulties at the age of seventeen due to misalignment of astrological aspects.
- Superstition – The novel states that superstitious customs prevail among the hindu religion followers in the provinces north to Kanyakumari.
  - The novel lists the below mentioned customs as ignominious demon goddess worships.
    - Ūṭṭŭ – Ūṭṭŭ or Kāḷiyūṭṭŭ or Ootu is a custom in the temples of Kali that involves the offering of particular eatables to the deity.
    - Pāṭṭŭ – Pāṭṭŭ or Patu is custom of Kali worship by reciting the songs about the deeds of goddess in a particular rhythm after the divine evocation of the deity to the Kaḷam (An illustration of the deity made on the floor. Kōlaṁ in Tamil) made for the custom, which at times done along with Ūṭṭŭ as ŪṭṭuṁPāṭṭuṁ.
    - Uruvaṁ Vaypŭ – Uruvaṁ Vaypŭ or Uruvam Vayp is a custom of goddess worship in which a human or divine figurine made of clay is placed near to the shrine.
    - Amman Koṭa – Amman Koṭa or Amman Koda is a custom of goddess worship in which offerings to the deity are made in the form of valuables.
    - Kuruti – Kuruti or Kuruthi is a custom of goddess worship that involves the offering of human or animal blood to the deity.
    - Cāvūṭṭŭ – Cāvūṭṭŭ or Chavootu is a custom in which eatables are offered to the deceased people.
  - Uccinakāḷi Sēva – In the novel, Anantham tells to Subhadra that Kodanki could have done Uccinakāḷi Sēva or Uchinakali Seva for precognitive results, for which he received gifts from Padmanabhan Thambi. Uccinakāḷi Sēva is the worship of Ucciṉimākāḷi or Uccimākāḷi, which is the form of Kali at Ujjayini and belief is that, doing the worship before any precognitive practice will yield good results.
  - In the novel, when the illness of king Rama Varma became severe even after getting the treatment, prince Marthanda Varma resort to conduct vaḻipāṭukaḷ or vazhipadukal (religious offerings), hōmaṅṅaḷ or homangal (offerings with fire), and donations for the king's good health.
- Clairvoyance – In the novel, Thirumukhathu Pilla relies on Mashinottam, a clairvoyant practice, to confirm about the rumors about the death of his son, Ananthapadmanabhan. Mashinottam or Maṣinōṭṭaṁ is an Indian clairvoyant service that prevails in Kerala. (Note: Mashinottam is an Indian clairvoyant practice, which includes gazing on the ink laid smooth surface to view the matters that are sought.)
- Paranormal retrocognition – The novel presents that Thirumukhathu Pilla goes for paranormal retrocognition through a clairvoyant practice, Mashinottam to verify whether prince Marthanda Varma was involved in the assumed murder of his son, Ananthapadmanbhan, however he is given with wrong results.
- Sorcery – In the novel, Velu Kuruppu mentions about the sorcery done by a namboothiripad of Akavoor family (Note: Akavoor Mana was a house of namboothiries situated at Vellarappilly near Kalady of Ernakulam district; some of the members of family were ascetics devoted to prayers, meditation, and Thaanthric rites.) by evoking protection on his armor shield by the incantation of seventy million Dhanwantharam, a set of hymns offered to Dhanvantari in order to safeguard from any ill luck.
- Occultism – The novel states that when the ailing king Rama Varma is not getting better with the ongoing treatment by traditional medicine practitioners, the people at palace opts to conduct occult acts by clergies, priests and magicians to extend the lifetime of the king.
- Miscegenation – The novel presents the miscegenation between a Shasthri (an aryan race) and a lady of Marvar caste (a dravidian race); whom are the parents of Sundarayyan and Kondanki. The novel also presents the interracial relationship between Beeram Khan and Fathima among whom, the former is a nair convert to muslim and latter is a pathan lady. In the novel, Hakkim wants Shamsudeen to marry Zulaikha, the sister of Fathima after the Islamization of the former, who is Ananthapadmanabhan in disguise whose caste or race is not ascertained in the novel by not providing any details about his mother.
- Racism – In the novel, Sundarayyan makes a racist remark against channar people that they are nīcappayakal (cruel ones) and suggests to Padmanabhan Thambi to exile them. Padmanabhan Thambi also makes a racist remark that he stepped on nīcaraktaṁ (cruel blood), when he accidentally steps into the ground covered with the blood of Channars, who were executed earlier following his order. Anantham, while talking to Subhadra, addresses Kondanki as pāṇṭimūtēvi, which means a slattern from the land of Pandyas. Shanku Assan addresses Sundarayyan as cutta maṟavan (a pure Maravar), kōmaṭṭi (a man of Komati caste), cuṭala māṭan (a demon who dwells on the cremation of corpses), cankuṁ punkumillātta paṭṭan (a man of Pattar clan without pharynx or anything similar), and kākka koṟavan (a black man of Kuravar clan, who eat crow meat) in racist manners. Shanku Assan addresses Kāśivāsi or the dweller of Kasi, as pīppannimāṭan (a demon like a boar that eats feces) and cāmbapaṟayan (a man of Sambava Parayar caste) in racist manners. Shanku Assan makes a racist remark about the people at pathan camp as nīśakūṭṭaṁ which means a group of cruel people. He also refers to Velu Kuruppu as paṭṭikkuṟuppŭ which means a bitch of Kurup clan (in 1891 ed.), which is changed to 'kuntakkuṟuppŭ' (a lancer from Kurup clan) in 1911 ed. and as karikkaṭṭapūtaṁ, which means black colored fiend. In the novel, Ananthapadmanabhan rudely says to Sundarayyan that "thān maṟavanaṭō" (hey! you are a Maravar).

=== Lifestyle practices ===
- Fraternal biandry – In the novel, Sundarayyan proposes to his wife Anantham to have a biandrous relationship with Kodanki, who is former's elder brother by remarking that fraternal biandry is normal among the community of his wife in those days, however Anantham did not agree to the same.
- Fraternal duel over woman – In the novel, Sundarayyan jokes to Padmanabhan Thambi not to have a fraternal duel over woman with Raman Thambi and end up like Sunda and Upasunda after falling for the beauty of Parukutty.
- Sibling incest – In the novel, Ananthapadmanabhan opposes the agreement of his father to the marriage proposal for his younger sister from Padmanabhan Thambi and when the proposal is cancelled, an enraged Sundarayyan says to Ananthapadmanabhan to keep an incestuous relationship with his younger sister, remarking that it will be an addition to the customs organized by Parasurama. The novel mentions that there is a custom in southern Kerala, which prohibits the meeting between a brother and a sister after either of them are matured implying the protective measures against sibling incest.
- Heirship – The Venad royal family follows the heirship through Marumakkathayam, collateral descent through maternal nephews. In the novel, Sundarayyan points that the above system is opposed to the common system of heirship through Makkathayam, which is lineal descent through sons, and propose to raise the claim of throne for the elder son of the king Rama Varma, Padmanabhan Thambi, who at one point of time conveys his worry to Sundarayyan about the latter system, which will bring his younger brother Raman Thambi against him. Ettuveettil Pillas pledge to make Padmanabhan Thambi as the next king by taking lethal actions against the prince Marthanda Varma, the legal heir to the kingdom, even though Ettuveettil Pillas follow the system of matrilineality with avuncular paterfamilias. Dr. P. V. Velayudhan Pillai points that some of the Ettuveettil Pillas are of Vellalar clan, who follow Makkathayam.
- Patrilocality – The novel presents that the family of Ugran Kazhakkoottathu Pilla, his wife Karthyayani Amma and daughter Parukutty were living as a patrilocal one until the demise of the former. In the novel it is also mentioned that Subhadra was staying at her husband's house until he went missing.
- Avuncular paterfamilias – The novel presents that the avuncular paterfamilias of matrilineal nair families end up doing the wrong deeds. Kudamon Pilla, Kalakkutty Pilla and Chembakasserry Mootha Pilla are the avuncular paterfamilias at Subhadra's house, Anantham's house and Chembakassery respectively, among whom the first one is killed by Ananthapadmanabhan, the second one exiles himself from the kingdom fearing treason charges for taking sides with Padmanabhan Thambi, and the third one chose to go along with decisions of his sister and leaves his paterfamilias for Ananthapadmanabhan.
- Matrilocality – In the novel, Parukutty and her mother chose matrilocality after the lifetime of Ugran Kazhakkoottathu Pilla. The novel states that, even though Ananthapadmanabhan has to be the paterfamilias for both Chemabakassery and his house, he chose to stay at his wife's house, Chemabakassery after his daughter is born.
- Matriarchy – In the novel, Karthyayani Amma exercises matriarchy, with which she banishes Shanku Assan from entering into the inner chambers at Chembakassery, when the latter voices against the marriage brokering by Sundarayyan, and she takes the charge of all arrangements and preparations for receiving Padamanabhan Thambi to proceed with the marriage proposal.
- Female inferiority – The novel mentions about the social system that do not allow Malayali women to decide on the men, whom they are going to marry. Subhadra, at one point concludes that Thirumukhathu Pilla seems to be intellectually lower even to women; implying women are considered as intellectually inferior to men. When her plans against Padmanabhan Thambi and Sundarayyan did not work as expected, Subhadra admits to herself that the intellect of women are really bad. Subhadra's servant who brought the medicine from pathan camp thinks that Subhadra is also an example to the thought, women are stacks of jealousy, when she becomes reluctant to hear his descriptions about Zulaikha's beauty.
- Coquettishness – The novel states that Subhadra was such a beauty in her adolescence, which made the men like Thambi duo, Chembazhanthi Pilla, Ramanamadathil Pilla to keep lingering around her, who pleased all of them with her coquettishness. Even though some men resumed so after the desertion of her husband, expect for Ramanamadathil Pilla all others refracted from the same. She eventually garnered herself a title Kulada (an unchaste woman) and at one point prince Marthanda Varma mentions that he heard about her as a Vyabhicharini (an immoral woman). In the novel, Subhadra gets the crucial information from Ramanamadathil Pilla, who always falls for her flirtatious company.
- Philandering – In the novel, Padmanabhan Thambi is presented as philanderer, who keeps relationships with the paramours Kamalam, Sivakami, the mistress at the seventh house, and the unnamed female prostitute at Kottar. Subhadra mentions that he was after her since she was ten years old. When Padamanabhan Thambi stays at Chemabakassery, at night he heads to Parukutty's chamber to attain her as he cannot control himself after being attracted to the beauty of Parukutty. In the first edition of the novel, Suandarayyan proposes to bring beautiful court-mistresses from Thanjavur for Padmanabhan Thambi.

== Allusion to writers, literatures and languages ==
=== Writers ===
- Thunchaththu Ezhuthachan – The novel mentions Thunchaththu Ezhuthachan when one of the guards at Kazhakkoottathu Pilla's Sree Pandarathu house draws a comparison between Ezhuthachan's version of Mahabharata and Māvārataṁ, a folk ballad of yesteryear Venad based on the characters from Mahabharata.
- P. Shangoony Menon – In the novel P. Shangoony Menon is referred while quoting the lethal attempts on the little prince Karthika Thirunal Rama Varma from A History of Travancore From the Earliest Times.
- Kunchan Nambiar – The novel refers to Kunchan Nambiar as the chief poet known as 'Kuñcan' who mentioned that a conflict arise either due to a lady love or gold.

The novel refers to Shankaracharyar as kēraḷēcārakaṟttāvŭ, which means the author of customs in Kerala. The novel refers to Venmani Achhan Nambudiripad as kavikulōttaṁsan (one at the crest of poets clan) and compares his lifetime to that of Sundarayyan. The novel also refers to an unnamed poet who lived during the timeline of novel and wrote about Kudamon Pilla that the latter had relationships with multiple women.

=== Literary works ===
==== Story-line adaptations ====
- Sree Veera Marthandavarmacharitham (Aattakatha) – Sree Veera Marthandavarmacharitham (Srīvīramāṟttāṇḍavaṟmmacaritaṁ) is an Aattakatha written by various authors based on the historical events of Venad. A four-line verse from the work that lists the Ettuveettil Pillas is used as epigraph of the eleventh chapter. The character of Sundarayyan in the novel is similar to the character of Pichakappalli in this Aattakatha.
- Marthandamahathmyam (Kilippattu) – Marthandamahathmyam (Māṟttāṇḍamahātmyaṁ) is lyrical work written as a Kilippattu based on the stories about Marthanda Varma. The situations in which Marthanda Varma escapes the attempts on his life by Thambi's men are in line with similar events mentioned in this literary work.
- Ottan Katha – Ottan Katha or Ottan Kathai (Ōṭṭan Kathai) is one of the ballads of Venad based on the stories about Marthanda Varma. The attack at Mangoikkal house by Padmanabhan Thambi's men in the novel is similar to the attack and eventual burning of Mangottu Assan's house in Ottan Katha.
- Ivanhoe – Ivanhoe by Sir Walter Scott is considered to be the greatest literary influence on the development of Marthandavarma. Like in Ivanhoe, the first chapter of the novel opens with the description of a forest, and every chapter opens with an epigraph similar to those in Scott's books. M. P. Paul claims that the characters Marthanda Vama, Ananthapadmanabhan, Chulliyil Chadachi Marthandan Pilla are based on the characters from Ivanhoe, even though those are based on the history and legends of Venad.

M. P. Paul also claims that the situations involving either the mad Channan, Subhadra or Thirumukhathu Pilla are similar to situations in William Shakespeare's King Lear and the character of Shanku Assan is similar to that of Dominie Sampson in Sir Walter Scott's Guy Mannering. Dr. M. Leelavathy suggests that the character of Subhadra is prototyped from the Flora McIvor of Scott's Waverley.

Neelikatha (subplot)
The novel mentions the story of Panchavankattu Neeli (Pañcavankāṭṭunīli, lit. Neeli of Pachavan forest) in the third chapter as narratted by Karthyayani Amma to Parukutty. According to Dr. P. Venugopalan, this is a combination of stories form the ballads Panchavankattu Neelikatha (Pañcavankāṭṭunīlikatha) and Neelikatha (Nīlikatha, lit. story of Neeli). Dr. Thikkurissi Gangadharan states that Kaḷḷiyankāttunīli (Neeli of Kalliyancaud) is changed to Pañcavankāṭṭunīli by the author of the novel.

==== Appropriations ====
- Nalacharitham (Aattakatha) – In the tenth chapter of the novel (paragraph 1, line 2), to describe about the face of Karthyayani Amma when she sees Sundarayyan, a verse is used from the scene one of Nalacharitham, first day. A verse from the scene one of Nalacharitham, second day is used in the third chapter (paragraph 4, line 1), to describe the adolescence of Parukutty. A phrase from scene one of Nalacharitham, third day is used in the first chapter (paragraph 1, line 2) to detail about the forest, and an idiom from the same scene is used in a conversation involving Sundarayyan, Karthyayani Amma and Chembakassery Mootha Pilla narrated in the fourteenth chapter (paragraph 7, line 3) of the novel. A verse from the scene six of Nalacharitham, third day is used as the second line of the epigraph provided for the third chapter. A two-line verse from the scene one of Nalacharitham, fourth day is used as epigraph of the fourth chapter. Three lines of verses from the scene six of Nalacharitham, fourth day are used as epigraph of the eighth chapter. A two-line verse from the scene nine of Nalacharitham, fourth day is used as epigraph of the fifth chapter.
- Adhyathmaramayanam (Kilippattu) – A two-line verse from the Ayodhyakandam of Adhyathmaramayanam is used as epigraph of the twenty-first chapter of the novel. Two phrases from a verse in the Aranyakandam are used in the first chapter (paragraph 1, line 2) to describe about the forest. A two-line verse from the Ravanante Ichabhangam of Sundarakandam is used as epigraph of the tenth chapter of the novel. In the third chapter of the novel, Parukutty recites a four-line verse from the Seethahanumalsamvadam of Sundarakandam. A four-line verse from the Hanoomadbavddhanam of Sundarakandam is used as epigraph of the twentieth chapter of the novel.
- Sree Mahabharatham (Kilippattu) – A four-line verse from the Sambavaparvam of Sree Mahabharatham (a Kilippattu version of Mahabharata written in Malayalam by Thunchaththu Ezhuthachan), is used as epigraph of the second chapter. An idiom and a part of a verse from Sambavaparvam are used to describe the character of Ramanamadathil Pilla in the twelfth chapter (paragraph 2, line 2) of the novel. A two-line verse from the Udyogaparvam of Sree Mahabharatham is used as epigraph of the twenty sixth chapter of the novel. A four-line verse from the Sthreeparvam of Sree Mahabharatham is used as epigraph of the first chapter.
- Harishchandracharitham (Aattakatha) – Harishchandracharitham (Hariscandracaritaṁ) is a lyrical work based on the story of Harishchandra as an Aattakatha by Pettayil Raman Pilla Asan. A verse from the Harishchandracharitham is used as the first line of the epigraph provided for the third chapter. In the fifth chapter (paragraph 4, line 16) of the novel, a three-line verse from Harishchandracharitham is used to describe the behavior of Mangoikkal Kuruppu. A two-line verse from Harishchandracharitham is used as epigraph of the seventh chapter.
- Ravanavijayam (Aattakatha) – Ravanavijayam (Rāvaṇavijayaṁ) is written as an Aattakatha by Vidwan Rajarajavarma Koi Tampuran of Kilimanur who is known as Vidvān Kōyittampurān based on the events from Ramayana involving Ravana. A three line verse from the Ravanavijayam is used as the epigraph of eighth chapter of the novel and a verse from the same is used in the tenth chapter (paragraph 15, line 8) to describe the behavior of Padmanabhan Thambi after hearing the voice of Parukutty.
- Kirmeerawadham (Aattakatha) – Kirmeerawadham (Kiṟmīravadhaṁ) is an Aattakatha written by the author known as Kōṭṭayattŭ Tampuran based events that lead to the death of Kirmira in Mahabharata. A verse from Kirmeerawadham is used to describe the mingling of Sundarayyan and Padmanabhan Thambi while stepping out of Thambi's residence at Padmanabhapuram palace.
- Rukmineeswayamvaram (Aattakatha) – Rukmineeswayamvaram (Rukmiṇīsvayaṁvaraṁ) is an Aattakatha written by Aswathi Thirunal Ramavarma Thampuran based on a few events from Bhagavata involving Krishna and Rukmini. A four-line verse from Rukmineeswayamvaram is used as epigraph of the ninth chapter and a phrase from the same work is used in the twelfth chapter (paragraph 1, line 12) to narrate the action of Ramanamadathil Pilla calling out for Subhadra.
- Subhadraharanam (Aattakatha) – Subhadraharanam (Subhadrāharaṇaṁ) is an Aattakatha by the author known as Mantṟēṭattŭ Nampūtiri based on the events from Bhagavata involving Arjuna and Subhadra. A two-line verse from Subhadraharanam is used as epigraph of the sixteenth chapter and a three-line verse from the same used as epigraph of the twenty-second chapter of the novel.
- Dakshayagam (Aattakatha) – Dakshayagam (Dakṣayāgaṁ) is an Aattakatha written by Irayimman Thampi based on the stories involving Daksha. A two-line verse from Dakshayagam is used as the last two lines of epigraph provided for the seventeenth chapter of the novel.
- Banayudham (Aattakatha) – Banayudham (Bāṇayuddhaṁ) is an Aattakatha written by author known as Bālakavi Rāmaśāstrikaḷ based on the events from Bhagavata. A two-line verse from Banayudham is used as epigraph of the eighteenth chapter of the novel.
- Keechakawadham (Aattakatha) – Keechakawadham (Kīcakavadhaṁ) is an Aattakatha written by Irayimman Thampi based on a few events from Mahabharata. A two-line verse from Keechakawadham is used as epigraph of the fifteenth chapter of the novel.
- Kalakeyawadham (Aattakatha) – Kalakeyawadham (Kālakēyavadhaṁ) is an Aattakatha written by the author known as Kōṭṭayattŭ Tampuran based on the events from Vana Parva of Mahabharata. An idiom that points to the look of Arjuna from Kalakeyawadham is used in the sixth chapter (paragraph 3, line 2) of the novel to describe the attire of Padmanabhan Thambi, and a phrase which points to the performance of character of Arjun in the same work is used in the tenth chapter (paragraph 13, line 5) to compare the behavior of Padmanabhan Thambi while he is entering to the Parukutty's room.
- Ramayanam (Irupathunalu Vritham) – A four-line verse from the Rāmāyaṇaṁ (Irupattunālu vr̥ttaṁ), which means Ramayanam in 24 chapters (lit. Ramayanam in 24 metre) supposedly written by Thunchaththu Ezhuthachan is used as epigraph of the sixth chapter.
- Ramayanam (Vilpattu) – Ramayanam as a Vilpattu (song sung with the music from bow strings) is considered as one of the ballads of Venad. In the eighteenth chapter (paragraph 6, line 18) a verse from Ramayanam (Vilpattu) is recited by mad Channan as a reply to the query raised by Chulliyil Chadachi Marthandan Pilla, when the former strucks down latter's arrow and bow.
- Vethalacharitham (Kilippattu) – Vethalacharitham (Vētāḷacaritaṁ) as a Kilippattu is a lyrical work by Kallēkuḷaṅṅara Rāghavapiṣāraṭi based on the stories of Vikramaditya. A verse from Vethalacharitham is used as epigraph of the nineteenth chapter of the novel.
- Syamanthakam (Ottan Thullal) – In the first chapter, the novel quotes the ideology mentioned by Kunchan Nambiar that a conflict among men is either due to woman or money, which was mentioned in his Symanthakam (Syamantakaṁ) Ottan Thullal, to conclude the reasons behind the attack on Ananthapadmanabhan at Panchavankadu.
- Krishnarjunavijayam (Thullal) – A phrase from Krishnarjunavijayam ( Kr̥ṣṇāṟjjunavijayaṁ) supposedly written by Kunchan Nambiar is used in the seventh chapter (paragraph 1, line 5) of the novel to describe the confrontation of Velu Kuruppu and Krishna Kuruppu.
- Neelikatha – Neelikatha (Nīlikatha) is the foremost of all the ballads of Venad and considered as most popular among the same group. Dr. Thikkurissi Ganagadharan list outs three different versions of Neelikatha and points out that there are various versions in the southern Tamil Nadu. According to Dr. P. Venugoplan the verses recited by mad Channan in the sixth and seventh chapter when he is questioned by Padmanabhan Thambi and when he is moving towards the Mangoikkal house by fighting with the lancers of Velu Kuruppu respectively are from one of the versions of Neelikatha, which is not either of the versions researched by Dr. Thikkurissi Ganagadharan and Dr. J. Padmakumari.
- Ponnarithal Katha – Ponnarithal Katha (Ponnaṟitāḷ Katha) is one of the ballads prevailed in Travancore; which according to Dr. Thikkurissi Ganagadharan might have originated from the migrants from the southern Tamil Nadu (Tirunelveli) to Venad. In the sixth chapter of the novel, the mad Channan sings a few lines from Ponnarithal Katha, when he is persuaded by Padmanabhan Thambi to answer properly to the latter's query.
- Unnamed – In the eleventh chapter of the novel Ramanamadathil Pilla recites a few broken lines to Kazhakkootathu Pilla from an un-titled ballad that deals with the murder of a prince to point that the former do not mind having prince Marthanda Varma killed.
- Mavaratham – Mavaratham (Māvārataṁ) is one of the ballads of Venad based on the characters from Mahabharata. In the tenth chapter of the novel the guards at Sree Pandarathu house recites a few verses from Mavaratham and when mad Channan voluntarily come into their group and questioned by them, he recites a few broken lines (paragraph 16, line 5) from the same.
- Iravikuttipillaporu – Iravikuttipillaporu (Iravikkuṭṭippiḷḷappōrŭ) is a historical ballad based on the Kaniyankulam war between Venad and Madurai Nayaks that led to the death of Iravikkutti Pillai. Dr. Thikkurissi Ganagadharan list outs six different versions of the literary work. According to Dr. P. Venugopalan the verses recited by mad Channan in the sixth chapter when he is questioned by Padmanabhan Thambi about the archer are from one of the versions of Iravikuttipillaporu.
- Bashanaishadham (Champu) – Bashanaishadham (Bhāṣānaiṣadhaṁ) is lyrical work written by the writer known as Mazhamangalam as a Champu based on the story of Nala and Damayanthi from Mahabharata. A four-line verse from Bashanaishadham is used as epigraph of twelfth chapter, another two-line verse from the same work is used as epigraph of twenty-third chapter, and a four-line verse is used as epigraph of the twenty-fifth chapter of the novel.
- Kuchelavritham (Vanchipattu) – Kuchelavritham (Kucēlavr̥ttaṁ) is a lyrical work written as Vanchipattu (boat song) by Ramapurathu Varrier. A verse from Kuchelavritham is used in the fourteenth chapter (paragraph 8, line 10) of the novel to compare the response of Subhadra, when she is affectionately received by Karthyayani Amma.
- Arjuanapathu – Arjuanapathu (Aṟjjunapattŭ) is a verse comprises ten names of Arjuna. In the twelfth chapter of the novel (paragraph 6, line 7) Sundarayyan makes a broken recitation of Arjuanapathu as he is terrified being alone in the dark.
- Gayathreemanthram – In the twelfth chapter of the novel (paragraph 6, line 7), a terrified Sundarayyan ends up reciting Gayathreemanthram (Gayatri Mantra) after starting with Arjuanapathu.
- Sivanandalahari – Sivanandalahari (Śivāṉandalahari) is a literary composition of Adi Sankaracharya comprises one hundred verses in praise of Shiva. In the twelfth chapter of the novel (paragraph 6, line 8), a terrified Sundarayyan makes a broken recitation of Sivanandalahari.
- Utsavaprabhandham – Utsavaprabhandham (Ulsavaprabandhaṁ) is a lyrical work written and composed by Swathi Thirunal describing the principal festival at Sri Padmanabhaswamy Temple and a verse from the same is used in the nineteenth chapter (paragraph 1, line 4) to detail the attire of Subhadra at her house.

=== Languages ===
The novel mentions about the languages Malayalam, Tamil and Hindustani, among which the former one is used primarily for the narration with the adopted words from Tamil, Sanskrit, English, Hindustani, Persian and a conversation in a substitution cipher, Mulabhadra.

==== Malayalam ====
The primary language used in the novel. In the novel, prince Marthanda Varma mentions that the diglot at the pathan camp seems to very good in Malayalam.

===== Ambiguous usage =====
The novel presents the ambiguous usages of the term nazhika (Note: Malayalam: നാഴിക, romanized: nāḻika) as a unit of measure for time and as a unit of measure for length. Nazhika^{1} as a unit of measure for time is analogous to Ghaṭi and 1 Nazhika corresponds to 24 minutes. Nazhika^{2} is a unit of measure for length prevailed in yesteryear Kerala at different denominations. Dr. A. C. Vasu cites two variants of the unit of measurement, among which the first one is termed as a "regional method" that equates 1 Nazhika to 1.828 kilometers, (Note: Regional method states that 1 Nazhika = 4000 Muzham. 1 Muzham = 18 inches, leads to 1 Nazhika = 1.828 kilometers) and the second one, "cochin survey method" equates 1 Nazhika to 914.4 meters. (Note: Cochin survey method states that 1 Nazhika = 2000 Kōl. 1 Kōl = 24 Viral = 1 Muzham, implying 1 Nazhika = 914.4 meters) C. V. Vyakhyanakosam states that 1 Nazhika corresponds to approximately (Note: C. V. Vyakhyanakosam states that 1 Nazhika = 2000 Daṇḍŭ. Approximation is derived by combining the "cochin survey method" in which 2000 Kōl = 1 Nazhika and the "contemporary survey method" which considers 1 Kōl = 1 Daṇḍŭ and 1 Kōl = 0.72 meters disregarding the 4 Kōl = 1 Daṇḍŭ relation in the "cochin survey method", so arriving at 1 Nazhika = 1.44 kilometers) 1.5 kilometers.

==== Sanskrit ====
Sanskrit words are extensively used in the novel, such as cētōharaṁ, (Note: ചേതോഹരം, Sanskrit: चेतोहरम्, lit. 'heart captive') saṁsaṟggaṁ, (Note: സംസർഗ്ഗം, a form of Sanskrit: संसर्ग, lit. 'acquaintance') skandha, (Note: സ്കന്ധ, Sanskrit: स्कन्ध, lit. 'shoulder') sthaulyaṁ, (Note: സ്ഥൗല്യം, a form of Sanskrit: स्थौल्य, lit. 'stout') śiraḥkambanamandasmitādikaḷ, (Note: ശിരഃകമ്പനമന്ദസ്മിതാദികൾ, a form of Sanskrit: शिरःकम्पनमन्दस्मितादि, lit. 'gentle laugh with a head shake') sōmavāravrataṁ, (Note: സോമവാരവ്രതം, Sanskrit: सोमवारव्रत, lit. 'fasting on Mondays') aṟddhōnmīlitaṁ, (Note: അർദ്ധോന്മീലിതം, a form of Sanskrit: अर्द्धोन्मीलित, lit. 'half open') khādyapēyalēhyabhōjya, (Note: ഖാദ്യപേയലേഹ്യഭോജ്യ, Sanskrit: खाद्यपेयलेह्यभोज्य, lit. 'chew-able, drinkable, lick-able, and eatable') tējaḥpuñjaṁ, (Note: തേജഃപുഞ്ജം, a form of Sanskrit: तेजःपुञ्ज, lit. 'heap of ardour') aḷivr̥ndaniṟmmitaṁ, (Note: അളിവൃന്ദനിർമ്മിതം, a form of Sanskrit: अलिवृन्दनिर्मित, lit. 'built by group of black bees') tāruṇyāraṁbhaṁ (Note: താരുണ്യാരംഭം, a form of Sanskrit: तारुण्यारंभ, lit. 'commencement of teenage') etc. to list a few. Dr. P. Venugopalan notes that some of the Sanskrit usages are changed in the revised edition.

==== Tamil ====
Tamil is extensively used in the conversations involving Sundarayyan, mad Channan, and the other Channar characters. Tamil words and prepositions are used in the statements of Shanku Assan, Anantham, Mangoikkal Kuruppu and in the narrations, among which, the Tamil word nāyaki (Note: Tamil: நாயகி, lit. 'spouse [feminine]', Malayalam: നായകി) in the first edition of the novel has been replaced with the adapted one, nāyika (Note: Malayalam: നായിക, lit. 'heroine' adapted from Sanskrit: नायिका, romanized: nāyikā, lit. 'the lady who leads') in the revised edition. In the novel, it is mentioned that Beeram Khan talks to the servant of Subhadra in Tamil.

==== Hindustani ====
The novel states that the pathan camp members converse in Hindustani. In the novel, Ananthapadmanabhan helps Mangoikkal Kuruppu to learn the language, and while confronted by Parukutty and her mother inside the dungeon at Chembakassery, the two men converse in Hindustani. The novel presents that Sundarayyan also knows Hindustani, in which he shouts while fighting with Beeram Khan. In the novel, while talking to Subhadra, Anantham uses a word enāṁ, (Note: Malayalam: എനാം, pronounced [enaːm] as in Tamil: எனாம், eṉām) which is an adapted word from the Hindustani one, inām. (Note: Hindi: इनाम, lit. 'reward', analogous to Urdu: انعام rooted from Arabic: إنعام, romanized: 'inʿām) The novel uses the words, caittān (Note: Malayalam: ചൈത്താൻ) a form of Hindustani word šaitān, (Note: शैतान, شیطون, lit. devil, analogous to Arabic: شیطون, šayṭān rooted from Hebrew: שָׂטָן, śāṭān) bahadūṟ, (Note: Malayalam: ബഹദൂർ) a form of Hindustani word bahādur. (Note: Hindi: बहादुर, lit. 'brave' بهادر, adapted from Persian: بهادر, bahadur rooted from Ottoman Turkish: بهادر, Turkish: baghatur, bahadır) hukka, (Note: Malayalam: ഹുക്ക) which is a form of Hindustani word hukkā, (Note: Hindi: हुक़्क़ा, lit. 'hookah' حقّہ, analogous to Urdu: حقہ, huqqā rooted from Arabic: حقة, ħúqqa) and kinkāb (Note: Malayalam: കിങ്കാബ്) which is a form of word kimkhvāb, (Note: Hindi: किम्ख्वाब, a conjoined form of kim and khwab originated or westernized from Hindi: कम, romanized: kam, lit. 'less' and Hindi: ख्वाब, romanized: khvāb, lit. 'dream', analogous to Urdu: خواب, Hindi: ख़्वाब, xvāb rooted from Persian: خواب, xâb respectively.) for silk brocade with gold and silver designs.

==== Persian ====
In the novel, Hakkim refers Mangoikkal Kuruppu as sāhēb (Note: Malayalam: സാഹേബ്) which is a form of Persian sāheb. (Note: Persian: صاحب, lit. 'lord', analogous to Hindi: साहिब, صاحب, sāhib, rooted from Arabic: صاحِب, ṣāḥib) The novel uses the term ṣaṟbatt, (Note: Malayalam: ഷർബത്ത്) which is a form of Persian word sharbat (Note: Persian: شربت, šarbat, analogous to Urdu: شربت, śarbat rooted from Arabic: شربة, shárba) for the beverages used in the pathan camp. The novel makes a usage for the shawl used by Thirumukhathu Pilla as sālva, (Note: Malayalam: സാൽവ) which is analogous to the English word and the Persian version shāl. (Note: Persian: شال)

==== English ====
The novel uses the word ṟōḍukaḷ, which is an adapted one from the English word roads, uses the English word, report as ṟepōṟṭṭu and for the meaning of guard while referring to the posture of Chembakassery Mootha Pilla at the door of Parukutty's room, the novel uses a word gāṭṭŭ akin to the obsolete form gard.

==== Mulabhadra ====
In the novel, Marthanda Varma and Parameswaran Pilla converse in Moolabadri while being in the presence of Kochu Velu, the youngest nephew of the Mangoikkal Kuruppu. Mulabhadra or Moolabadri is a way of a substitution ciphering prevailed in Travancore using Malayalam script.

== Bibliography ==
- Aiya, V. Nagam (1999) [1906]. The Travancore State Manual. Vol. I. Thiruvananthapuram: Kerala Gazetteers Department, Govt. of Kerala.
- Menon, P. Shangoony (1998) [1879]. History of Travancore from the Earliest Times. New Delhi: Asian Educational Services.
- Pillai, T.K. Velu (1996) [1940]. The Travancore State Manual (in Malayalam). Vol. II. Thiruvananthapuram: Kerala Gazetteers Department, Govt. of Kerala.

- Anonymous authors (1996) [1325–1872]. Pillai, T.K. Velu (ed.). Historical Documents (in Malayalam).

- Kunju, Dr. A.P. Ibrahim (2005) [1990]. Māṟttāṇḍavaṟmma: Ādhunika Tiruvitāṁkūṟinṟe Udayaṁ മാർത്താണ്ഡവർമ്മ: ആധുനിക തിരുവിതാംകൂറിന്റെ ഉദയം [Marthanda Varma: Rise of Modern Travancore] (in Malayalam). Thiruvananthapuram: Cultural Publications Department, Govt. of Kerala.
- Pillai, C. V. Raman (2009) [1891]. Māṟttāṇḍavaṟmma മാർത്താണ്ഡവർമ്മ [Marthandavarma] (Definitive Variorum Revised ed.).

- Pilla, Prof. N. Krishna; Nair, Prof. V. Anandakkuttan (2009) [1983]. Māṟttāṇḍavaṟmma: Caritravuṁ Kalpanayuṁ മാർത്താണ്ഡവർമ്മ: ചരിത്രവും കല്പനയും [Marthandavarma: History and Figment] (in Malayalam).
- Pilla, Prof. N. Krishna; Nair, Prof. V. Anandakkuttan (2009) [1983]. Kathākālaṁ; saṁbhavasthalaṅṅaḷ കഥാകാലം; സംഭവസ്ഥലങ്ങൾ [Timeline of story; Incident locations] (in Malayalam).
- Pilla, Dr. K. Raghavan (2009) [1983]. Si. Vi. yuṭe Caritrākhyāyikakaḷkk Orāmukhaṁ സി വി യുടെ ചരിത്രാഖ്യായികകൾക്ക് ഒരാമുഖം [An Introduction to CV's Historical Narratives] (in Malayalam).
- Venugopalan, Dr. P. (2009) [1992]. Sūcitasāhityakr̥tikaḷ - oru paṭhanaṁ സൂചിതസാഹിത്യകൃതികൾ - ഒരു പഠനം [Referred Literary works – A study] (in Malayalam).
- Venugopalan, Dr. P. (2009) [1992]. Māṟttāṇḍavaṟmma: Sr̥ṣṭiyuṁ svarūpavuṁ മാർത്താണ്ഡവർമ്മ: സൃഷ്ടിയും സ്വരൂപവും [Marthandavarma: Creation and Formation] (in Malayalam).
- Venugopalan, Dr. P. (2009) [1992]. Vyākhyānakuṟippukaḷ വ്യാഖ്യാനക്കുറിപ്പുകൾ [Explanatory notes] (in Malayalam).

- Gopalakrishnan, Dr. Naduvattom (2008). Nāṭōṭi Caritrakkathakaḷ നാടോടി ചരിത്രക്കഥകൾ [Folk historical stories] (in Malayalam). Thiruvananthapuram: Malu Ben Publications.
- Nair, P. K. Parameswaran (1959) [1948]. Si. Vi. Rāman Piḷḷa സി. വി. രാമൻ പിള്ള [C. V. Raman Pillai] (in Malayalam). Thriuvananthapuram: Kerala Sahithya Sahakarana Sangham.
- Elenkath, K. R. (1974). Dewan Nanoo Pillay Biography with his select writings and letters. Neyyoor-West: Dewan Nanoo Pillay Memorial Reading Room.

- Pillay, Nanoo (1974) [1886]. Elenkath, K. R. (ed.). The Sketch of Progress of Travancore.

- Staff Reporter (9 June 2012). "Our archival heritage". Metro Plus. Thiruvananthapuram: The Hindu. Archived from the original on 15 January 2022.
- Balakrishnan, Dr. B. C.; Kartha, K. B.; Nair, Prof. Aliam Bhaskaran; Omana, Ms. P. V., eds. (1994). Si. Vi. Vyākhyānakōśaṁ സി. വി. വ്യാഖ്യാനകോശം [C. V. Exegetic Dictionary] (in Malayalam). Vol. I. Thiruvananthapuram: C. V. Raman Pillai National Foundation.
- Balakrishnan, Dr. B. C.; Satheesh, Mrs. P. V. Omana, eds. (1997). Si. Vi. Vyākhyānakōśaṁ സി. വി. വ്യാഖ്യാനകോശം [C. V. Exegetic Dictionary] (in Malayalam). Vol. II. Thiruvananthapuram: C. V. Raman Pillai National Foundation.
- Balakrishnan, Dr. B. C.; Satheesh, Mrs. P. V. Omana, eds. (2002). Si. Vi. Vyākhyānakōśaṁ സി. വി. വ്യാഖ്യാനകോശം [C. V. Exegetic Dictionary] (in Malayalam). Vol. III. Thiruvananthapuram: C. V. Raman Pillai National Foundation.
- Balakrishnan, Dr. B. C.; Satheesh, Mrs. P. V. Omana, eds. (2004). Si. Vi. Vyākhyānakōśaṁ സി. വി. വ്യാഖ്യാനകോശം [C. V. Exegetic Dictionary] (in Malayalam). Vol. IV. Thiruvananthapuram: C. V. Raman Pillai National Foundation.

- Venugopalan, Dr. P. (2004). Anubandhaṁ 3: Uddharaṇaṅṅaḷ, Upādāvaṅṅāḷ അനുബന്ധം 3 : ഉദ്ധരണങ്ങൾ, ഉപാദാനങ്ങൾ [Annexure 3: Quotations, Appropriations] (in Malayalam).

- Nair, Prof. Panmana Ramachandran, ed. (2013). Si. Vi. Paṭhanaṅṅaḷ സി. വി. പഠനങ്ങൾ [C. V. Studies]. Thiruvananthapuram: P. K. Parameswaran Nair Memorial Trust. ISBN 978-81-240-1956-6.

- Sasibhooshan, Dr. M. G. (2013). Peruntaccanṟe Baliṣṭhaśilpaṅṅaḷ പെരുന്തച്ചന്റെ ബലിഷ്ഠശില്പങ്ങൾ [Perunthachan's Strong Structures] (in Malayalam).

- Varatharajan, K. P. (2000). Tiruvaṭi Tēcaṁ Tiruppāppūr Paramparai Śrīmat Aṉantapatmanāpaṉ Nāṭār Varalāṟu திருவடி தேசம் திருப்பாப்பூர் பரம்பரை மாவீரன் ஶ்ரீமத் அனந்தபத்மநாபன் நாடார் வரலாறு [History of great hero Mr. Ananthapadmanabhan Nadar in Thripappur lineage of Thiruvati nation] (in Tamil). Kattathurai: Ananthapadmanabhan Trust.
- Gangadharan, Dr. Thikkurissi, ed. (2011). Iravikkuṭṭippiḷḷappōr Oru Pṭhanaṁ ഇരവിക്കുട്ടിപ്പിള്ളപ്പോര് ഒരു പഠനം [Fight of Ravikutty Pillai: A study] (in Malayalam). Thriruvananthapuram: Sahithya Kairali Publications.
- Valath, V. V. K. (1998). Kēraḷattile Sthalacaritraṅṅaḷ: Tiruvaṉantapuraṁ Jilla കേരളത്തിലെ സ്ഥലചരിത്രങ്ങൾ : തിരുവനന്തപുരം ജില്ല [Locality histories in Kerala: Thiruvananthapuram district] (in Malayalam). Thrissur: Kerala Sahitya Akademi.

- Pilla, Sooranad Kunjan (1998) [1992]. Valath, V. V. K. (ed.). Kiḻakkē kōṭṭayuṁ paṭiññāṟē kōṭṭayuṁ കിഴക്കേ കോട്ടയും പടിഞ്ഞാറേ കോട്ടയും [East fort and West fort] (in Malayalam).

- Moothathu, Vaikkath Pachu (1986) [1867]. Tiruvitāṁkūṟ Caritraṁ തിരുവിതാംകൂർ ചരിത്രം [Travancore History] (in Malayalam). Kochi: Prathibha Publications.
- Immanuel, Dr. M.; Sarveswaran, Dr. P., eds. (2011). Māvīraṉ Taḷapati Aṉantapatmanāpaṉ மாவீரன் தளபதி அனந்தபத்மநாபன் [Great Commander Ananthapadmanabhan] (in Tamil). Nagercoil: Cultural Historical Linguistic Indigenous Research Organisation, India.

- Shobhanan, Dr. B. (2011). A Note on Ananthapadmanabhan.
- Parthan (2011). Anantapatmanābhan nāṭāruṁ tiruvitāṁkūṟ niṟmmitiyuṁ അനന്തപത്മനാഭൻ നാടാരും തിരുവിതാംകൂർ നിർമ്മിതിയും [Ananthapadmanabhan Nadar and Travancore formation] (in Malayalam).

- Pazhani, Dr. T. (2003). Social Change among the Vellalas of Nanchinad. Aluva: Pen Books.
- Menon, B.K (1936). Marthanda varma (First ed.). Trivandrum: Kamalalaya Book Depot.
- "Prasnam". Services. Kottayam: PN Sreedharan Nampoothiri, Piraliyil Illam.
- Narayanan, K. S. (2010). "Mashinottam, A unique Divinatory Path". Articles on Astrology. Chennai: Express Starteller.
- Narayanan, Dr Akavoor (2005). Bhattathiripad, P. Vinod (ed.). "Akavoor Mana". Some Namboothiri Illams. Calicut: Namboothiri Websites Trust.
- Krishnan, K. S. (1991) [1988]. Si. Vi. Caritrākhyāyikakaḷilūṭe സി. വി. ചരിത്രാഖ്യായികകളിലൂടെ [C. V., through the Historical Narratives] (in Malayalam). Kottayam: Sahitya Pravarthaka Co-operative Society Ltd.
- Pillai, Dr. A. M. Vasudevan (1991). Nōvaluṁ Rāṣṭṟīyavuṁ നോവലും രാഷ്ട്രീയവും [Novel and Politics] (in Malayalam). Thrissur: Kerala Sahitya Akademi.
- Janarthanan, M. (June 2008). A History of Nayars of South Travancore (Ph.D.). Tirunelveli: Manonmaniam Sundaranar University.
- Pillai, Dr. P. V. Velayudhan (2000). Āṇuṅṅaḷillātta Koṟa Valyakoṟa (Si.vi nōvalukaḷ oru punaṟvāyana) ആണുങ്ങളില്ലാത്ത കൊറ വല്യകൊറ (സി.വി. നോവലുകൾ ഒരു പുനർവായന) [Scarcity of Men is a major exiguity (C. V. Novels, a re-reading)] (in Malayalam). Thiruvananthapuram: Prabhatham Printing and Publishing Co.
- Benjamin, Dr. D. (2010) [1994]. Nōvalsāhityapaṭhanaṅṅaḷ നോവൽസാഹിത്യപഠനങ്ങൾ [Novel literature studies] (in Malayalam). Thiruvananthapuram: MaluBen Publications. ISBN 978-81-87480-65-5.
- Sarveswaran, Dr. P., ed. (1982). Ōṭṭaṉ Katai ஓட்டன் கதை [Runner Tale] (in Tamil). Madurai: Mano Publishers.
- Devi, R. Leela (1978). Influence of English on Malayalam Novels. Trivandrum: College Book House.
- George, K. M. (1998) [1972]. Western Influence on Malayalam Language and Literature. New Delhi: Sahitya Akademi.
- Paul, M. P. (1991) [1930]. Nōvalsāhityaṁ നോവൽസാഹിത്യം [Novel Literature] (in Malayalam) (First Poorna ed.). Kozhikode: Poorna Publications.
- Nair, S. Guptan (1992). C. V. Raman Pillai (First ed.). New Delhi: Sahitya Akademi.
- Gangadharan, Dr. Thikkurissi (22 August 2012). Madhusudanan, M. S.; Vellayani, Manju (eds.). "Vēṇāṭṭile yakṣikaḷ" വേണാട്ടിലെ യക്ഷികൾ [Fairies of Venad]]. Kerala Kaumudi Weekily (in Malayalam). 16 (34). Thriruvananthapuram: Kerala Kaumudi.
- Variyar, Unnayi (2003) [1700–1750]. Naḷacaritaṁ (Onnāṁ Divasaṁ) നളചരിതം (ഒന്നാം ദിവസം) [Nalacharitham (1^{st} day)] (in Malayalam) (Fourth ed.). Kottayam: Sahitya Pravarthaka Co-operative Society Ltd.
- Variyar, Unnayi (2001) [1700–1750]. Naḷacaritaṁ (Raṇṭāṁ Divasaṁ) നളചരിതം (രണ്ടാം ദിവസം) [Nalacharitham (2^{nd} day)] (in Malayalam). Kottayam: Sahitya Pravarthaka Co-operative Society Ltd.
- Variyar, Unnayi (2007) [1700–1750]. Naḷacaritaṁ (Mūnnāṁ Divasaṁ) നളചരിതം (മൂന്നാം ദിവസം) [Nalacharitham (3^{rd} day)] (in Malayalam). Kottayam: Sahitya Pravarthaka Co-operative Society Ltd.
- Variyar, Unnayi (2003) [1700–1750]. Naḷacaritaṁ (Nālāṁ Divasaṁ) നളചരിതം (നാലാം ദിവസം) [Nalacharitham (4^{th} day)] (in Malayalam). Kottayam: Sahitya Pravarthaka Co-operative Society Ltd.
- Ezhuthachan, Thunchathu (1999) [1500–1699]. Śrīmahābhārataṁ Strīpaṟvvaṁ ശ്രീമഹാഭാരതം സ്ത്രീപർവ്വം [Great Mahabharat – Lady Section] (in Malayalam) (Fourth ed.). Kottayam: Sahitya Pravarthaka Co-operative Society Ltd.
- Gangadharan, Dr. Thikkurissi (2011). Vēṇāṭinṟe Kthāgānaṅṅaḷ വേണാടിന്റെ കഥാഗാനങ്ങൾ [Ballads of Venad] (in Malayalam). Thriruvananthapuram: Sahithya Kairali Publications.
- Padmakumari, Prof. J., ed. (2009). Tekkan Pāṭṭukaḷ: Pāṭhavuṁ Paṭhanavuṁ തെക്കൻ പാട്ടുകൾ : പാഠവും പഠനവും [Southern Ballads: Text and Study] (in Malayalam). Thrissur: Kerala Sahitya Akademi.
- Pilla, P. Govinda, ed. (1917). Malayāḷattile Paḻaya Pāṭṭukaḷ മലയാളത്തിലെ പഴയ പാട്ടുകൾ [Old songs in Malayalam] (in Malayalam). Thiruvananthapuram: Vidyavilasa Prasideekaranashala.
- Vasu, Dr. A. C (2009). Enṟe Malayāḷaṁ എന്റെ മലയാളം [My Malayalam] (in Malayalam). Thrissur: Kerala Sahitya Akademi.
- Sumathi, G. J. (2004) [2002]. Elements of Fashion and Apparel Design. New Delhi: New Age International Publishers.
