= Merger of Kanyakumari with Madras State =

History of Kanyakumari

The present-day Kanyakumari district and parts of Tenkasi district of Tamil Nadu state in India was originally a part of the Travancore-Cochin state. Between 1945 and 1956, especially after the Government of India announced plans to reorganize states along linguistic lines, the people of Tamil-majority Kanyakumari campaigned for its inclusion in the Madras State (later Tamil Nadu) instead of the Malayalam-majority Kerala state. In Tamil, the campaign is also known as Therkku Ellai Porattam ("South Frontier Struggle").

The campaign was successful: Agastheeswaram, Kalkulam, Thovalai, Vilavancode and half part of Shenkottai taluks were merged with Madras as per the States Reorganisation Act, 1956. The first four were combined to form the present-day Kanyakumari district, while Shenkottai was merged with the Tirunelveli district present day tenkasi district

== Background ==
Thus there was a significant Tamil population in the Thovalai, Agastheeswaram, Sengottai, Eraniel, Vilavancode, Kalkulam, Devikulam, Peerumedu, Neyyattinkara, Thiruvananthapuram South and Thiruvananthapuram North taluks of erstwhile Travancore State. In the Tamil regions, Malayalam was the official language and there were only a few Tamil-medium schools. The Travancore State Government continued rejecting the requests of Tamils.

During that period the Travancore State Congress favoured the idea of uniting all the Malayalam speaking regions and the formation of a "Unified Kerala". In protest against this idea, many Tamil leaders vacated the party. Tamils gathered together at Nagercoil on 16 December 1945 under the leadership of Sam Nathaniel and formed the new political party All Travancore Tamilian Congress. That party was continuously compelling for the merger of Tamil regions in Travancore with Tamil Nadu.

=== Demographics of Travancore ===
Census year	Total population	Malayalam		Tamil		Others		Source
1875	2,311,379	1,902,533	82.32%	387,909	16.78%	20,937	0.91%	
1881	2,401,158	1,937,454	80.69%	439,565	18.31%	24,139	1.01%	
1891	2,557,736	2,079,271	81.29%	448,322	17.53%	30,143	1.18%	
1901	2,952,157	2,420,049	81.98%	492,273	16.68%	39,835	1.35%	
1911	3,428,975	2,836,728	82.73%	554,618	16.17%	37,629	1.10%	
1921	4,006,062	3,349,776	83.62%	624,917	15.60%	31,369	0.78%	
1931	5,095,973	4,260,860	83.61%	788,455	15.47%	46,658	0.92%	

Distribution of Language by Division (1881)
Name of Division	Malayalam (%)	Tamil (%)
Padmanabhapuram Division	11.24	88.03
Thiruvananthapuram Division	87.05	12.09
Quilon Division	92.42	6.55
Cottayam Division	95.19	3.65
Devicolam Division	36.18	59.14

Languages by Taluks (1881)
Name of Taluk		Total population	Malayalam		Tamil		Others	
1	Thovalai	30,260	190	0.63%	29,708	98.18%	362	1.20%
2	Agasteeswaram	78,979	705	0.89%	76,645	97.04%	1,629	2.06%
3	Eraniel	112,116	9,640	8.60%	102,389	91.32%	87	0.08%
4	Culcoolum	60,908	10,528	17.29%	49,930	81.98%	450	0.74%
5	Vilavancode	69,688	18,497	26.54%	51,172	73.43%	19	0.03%
6	Neyyattinkarai	110,410	97,485	88.29%	12,809	11.60%	116	0.11%
7	Thiruvananthapuram South	51,337	39,711	77.35%	10,522	20.50%	1,104	2.15%
8	Thiruvananthapuram North	51,649	38,979	75.47%	11,102	21.50%	1,568	3.04%
9	Nedoomangad	52,211	48,492	92.88%	3,573	6.84%	146	0.28%
10	Sheraingil	87,072	82,339	94.56%	4,629	5.37%	146	0.17%
11	Kottarakkarai	55,924	51,836	94.56%	3,994	7.14%	94	0.17%
12	Pathanapuram	37,064	35,264	95.14%	1,603	4.32%	197	0.53%
13	Sengottai	30,477	7	0.02%	29,694	97.43%	776	2.55%
14	Quilon	108,469	103,775	95.67%	3,650	3.37%	1,044	0.96%
15	Kunnathur	62,700	60,330	96.22%	2,339	3.73%	31	0.05%
16	Karunagapully	101,039	99,079	98.06%	1,814	1.80%	146	0.14%
17	Karthikapully	81,969	79,705	97.24%	1,059	1.29%	1,205	1.47%
18	Mavelikkarai	111,731	107,404	96.13%	4,139	3.70%	188	0.17%
19	Chengannur	81,301	80,295	98.76%	986	1.21%	20	0.02%
20	Thiruvallai	103,007	101,041	98.09%	1,664	1.62%	302	0.29%
21	Ambalappulay	93,401	82,345	88.16%	5,864	6.28%	5,192	5.56%
22	Sharetala	113,704	107,108	94.20%	2,312	2.03%	4,284	3.77%
23	Vycome	76,414	72,827	95.31%	2,684	3.51%	903	1.81%
24	Yettoomanoor	79,058	75,004	94.87%	3,879	4.91%	175	0.22%
25	Cottayam	64,958	63,831	98.27%	722	1.11%	405	0.62%
26	Chunganacherry	74,154	66,481	89.65%	7,394	9.97%	279	0.38%
27	Meenachel	57,102	55,186	96.64%	1,857	3.25%	59	0.10%
28	Moovattupulay	95,460	93,473	97.92%	1,930	2.02%	57	0.06%
29	Todupulay	24,321	23,227	95.50%	1,085	4.46%	9	0.04%
30	Cunnathunad	109,625	108,083	98.59%	831	0.76%	711	0.65%
31	Alangaud	66,753	65,839	98.63%	571	0.86%	343	0.51%
32	Paravoor	61,966	56,495	91.17%	3,332	5.38%	2,139	3.45%
33	Cardamom Hills	6,228	2,253	36.18%	3,683	59.14%	292	4.69%
-	Travancore	2,401,158	1,937,454	80.69%	439,565	18.31%	24,139	1.01%

== Travancore Tamil Nadu Congress (T.T.N.C) ==
In the working committee meeting of Tamilian congress at Eraviputhur on 30 June 1946, the name of the political party was changed to Travancore Tamil Nadu Congress (T.T.N.C). T.T.N.C was popular among the Tamils living in Thovalai and Agateeswaram Taluks. Mr. Ma. Po. Sivagnanam (Ma.Po.Si) was the only leader from Tamil Nadu who functioned in favour of T.T.N.C.

After the independence of India, State Assembly Elections were announced in Travancore. As a consequence, T.T.N.C improved its popularity among Tamils. A popular and leading advocate from Vilavancode Mr. A. Nesamony organised a meeting of his supporters at Allan Memorial Hall, Nagercoil on 8 September 1947. In that meeting it was declared that they must achieve their objective through their political organisation, the T.T.N.C. And T.T.N.C started gaining strength and momentum in Kalkulam - Vilavancode Taluks.

== 1948 police firing ==
During the election propaganda campaign, clashes occurred between the Tamil speaking communities and the Malayalam speaking communities at various places in Kalkulam - Vilavancode Taluks. police force suppressed the agitating Nadars. In February 1948 police opened fire and two Tamil speaking Nadars were killed.

T.T.N.C won in 14 constituencies in the election to the State Legislative Assembly. Mr. A. Nesamony was elected as the legislative leader of the party. Then under his leadership, the awakened Tamil population was prepared to undergo any sacrifice to achieve their goal.

== 1952 general elections ==
In 1950, a meeting was held at Palayamkottai to make compromises between state congress and T.T.N.C. The meeting met with failure and Mr. Sam Nathaniel resigned from the post of president of T.T.N.C Mr. P. Ramasamy Pillai, a strong follower of Mr. A. Nesamony was elected as the New President.

The first general election of Independent India was held on 1952. T.T.N.C won 8 legislative assembly seats. Mr. A. Chidambaranathan became the minister on behalf of T.T.N.C in the coalition state government formed by the Congress. In the parliamentary Constituency Mr. A. Nesamony was elected as M.P. and in the Rajyasabha seat. Mr. A. Abdul Razak was elected as M.P. on behalf of T.T.N.C.

In due course, accusing the Congress government for not showing enough care the struggle of the Tamils, T.T.N.C had broken away from the coalition and the Congress government lost the majority. So fresh elections were announced. In 1954 elections, T.T.N.C gained victory in 12 constituencies.

== 1954 police firing ==
Pattom Thanu Pillai was the chief minister for Thiru - Kochi legislative assembly. He engaged hard measures against the agitations of Tamils. Especially the Tamils at Devikulam - Peerumedu regions went through the atrocities of Travancore Police force. Condemning the attitude of the police, T.T.N.C leaders from Nagercoil went to Munnar and participated in agitations against the prohibitive orders. The leaders were arrested and an uncalm atmosphere prevailed in South Travancore.

On 11 August, Liberation Day celebrations were held at many places in South Travancore. Public meetings and processions were organised . Communists also collaborated with the agitation programmes. Police opened fire at the processions in Thoduvetty (Martandam) and Puthukadai. Nine Tamil volunteers were killed and thousands of T.T.N.C and communist sympathizers were arrested in various parts of Tamil main land. At the end, Pattom Thanu Pillai's ministry was toppled and normalcy returned to the Tamil regions.

== States Reorganization Commission ==
The central government had appointed Fazal Ali Commission(1953 dec) for the states reorganisation based on language. It submitted its report on 10 August 1955. Based on this report, Devikulam - Peermedu and Neyyattinkara Taluks were merged with Kerala state.

On 1 November 1956 - four Taluks Thovalai, Agastheeswaram, Kalkulam, Vilavancode were recognised to form the New Kanyakumari District and merged with Tamil Nadu State. Half of Sengottai Taluk was merged with Tirunelveli District. The main demand of T.T.N.C was to merger the Tamil regions with Tamil Nadu and major part of its demand was realised. So T.T.N.C was dissolved thereafter.

== Retainment of Devikulam and Peerumedu Taluks in Kerala ==
Apart from Kanyakumari district, the Taluks of Devikulam and Peermade in present-day Idukki district also had a Tamil-majority until late 1940's. The T.T.N.C had also requested to merge these Taluks with Madras State. However it was due to some decisions of Pattom Thanu Pillai, who was the first prime minister of Travancore, that they retained in the modern-state of Kerala. Pattom came up with a colonisation project to re-engineer the demography of Cardamom Hills. His colonisation project was to relocate 8,000 Malayalam-speaking families into the Taluks of Devikulam and Peermade. About 50,000 acres in these Tamil majority taluks were chosen for the project. The States Reorganisation Commission cited this project to show the determination of the government to develop Tamil areas, which was a key reason why it recommended these Tamil-speaking regions be retained in Kerala.

== See Also ==
Andhra Pradesh and Madras Alteration of Boundaries Act, 1959
