= Manjalumoodu =

- Village
- Location in Tamil Nadu, India
- Coordinates: 8.34°N 77.18°E
- Country: India
- State: Tamil Nadu
- District: Kanniyakumari

Languages
  - Official: Tamil
  - Spoken languages: Tamil$\wedge$ Malayalam
- Time zone: UTC+5:30 (IST)
- PIN: 629151
- Area code: +91-4651
- Vehicle registration: TN 75

Manjalumoodu is a village in the Kanniyakumari district in the state of Tamil Nadu, India.

== Nearby villages ==
- Arudesam
- Keezhkulam
- Paloor
- Kilamalai R F
- Puliyoorsalai
- Muzhucode
- Malayadi
- Vanniyoor
- Maruthancode
- Vellamcode
- Kulappuram

Manjalumoodu
Block / Tehsil	Vilavancode
District	kanniyakumari
State	Tamil Nadu

== Agriculture ==
Manjalumoodu is a small island located in Vilavancode taluk in the district of Kanniyakumari district in the state of Tamil Nadu, India. It is very close to the foothills of the Western Ghats with all of the available land in the village used for harvesting rubber. The main occupation in this area is rubber tapping which is the process by which latex is collected from a rubber tree.

Vilavancode is the nearest town to Manjalumoodu village.

== Education ==
Narayanaguru College of Engineering, an affiliate of University Chennai, is located near Manjalumoodu. The Sigma College of Architecture is also near Manjalumoodu.
