= Sreekanteswaram =

- Town
- Location in Kerala, India
- Coordinates: 8°28′28″N 76°56′51″E
- Country: India
- State: Kerala
- District: Thiruvananthapuram

Government
  - Type: Democratic

Languages
  - Official: Malayalam, English
- Time zone: UTC+5:30 (IST)
- PIN: 695023
- Telephone code: 0471
- Vehicle registration: KL-01

Sreekanteswaram is a place in Thiruvananthapuram city (Trivandrum), India. The place is known for the Siva temple, from which the name was derived. Pazhaya Sreekanteswaram Temple is the original abode of the Lord of new Sreekanteswaram Mahadeva Temple. Author of Sabdatharavali, Sreekanteswaram Padmanabha Pillai hails from this place.

== Geography ==
Sreekanteswaram is a busy residential area in the Thiruvananthapuram city and is bordered by Pazhavangadi on the east, Fort on the south and Kaithamukku on the west. The place is located around 1 km from East Fort and 2 km from Statue Junction. The Sreekanteswaram Park and the Sreekanteswaram Siva temple are the major landmarks.

== See also ==
- Sreekanteswaram Mahadeva Temple
- Sreekanteswaram Padmanabha Pillai
- Perunthanni
