= Pulippunam =

Neighbourhood in Kanyakumari district, Tamil Nadu, India

Pulippunam Pulipanam
- Town
- Location in Tamil Nadu, India
- Coordinates: 8°17.2887′N 77°15.4871′E
- Country: India
- State: Tamil Nadu
- District: Kanyakumari

Languages
  - Official: Tamil
- Time zone: UTC+5:30 (IST)
- PIN: 629158
- Telephone code: 04651
- Vehicle registration: TN-74, TN-75
- Nearest city: Nagercoil & Marthandam
- Lok Sabha constituency: Kanyakumari
- Vidhan Sabha constituency: Kalkulam

Pulippunam is a village in Kanyakumari district, Tamil Nadu, India. It is one of the most fertile lands of Tamil Nadu and has the climatic conditions of Kerala. It has a National Highway connecting the capital of Kerala, Trivandrum, with the southernmost tip of India, Kanyakumari district.

== Transport ==
Pulippunam is well connected to Chennai, Mumbai, Bangalore by rail service from Palliyadi Railway station and also bus service to all over Tamil Nadu.
