= Andhra Pradesh and Madras Alteration of Boundaries Act, 1959 =

Parliament of India territory transfer act

Andhra Pradesh and Madras (Alteration of Boundaries) Act, 1959

Parliament of India
- Long title: An Act to provide for the alteration of boundaries of the States of Andhra Pradesh and Madras and for matters connected therewith.
- Citation: Act No. 56 of 1959
- Enacted: 24 December 1959
- Assented to by: President
- Assented to: 24 December 1959
- Commenced: 1 April 1960
- Status: In force

The Andhra Pradesh and Madras (Alteration of Boundaries) Act, 1959 (Act No. 56 of 1959), enacted by the Parliament of India under the provisions of article 3 of the constitution, went into with effect from 1 April 1960. Under the act, Tirutani taluk and Pallipattu sub-taluk of Chittoor district of Andhra Pradesh were transferred to Madras State in exchange for territories from the Chingelput (Chengalpattu) and Salem districts.

A total of 319 villages from three different taluks of Chitoor district and a small forest area were transferred from Andhra Pradesh to Madras State in exchange for 148 villages of Chingelput district and three villages from Salem district, together with certain forest areas.

The parliamentary constituencies of Chittoor in Andhra Pradesh and the Chingleput and Tiruvallur in Madras were considerably altered by this exchange of territories. As the greater parts of Tiruttani and Ramakrishnarajapet assembly constituencies in Andhra Pradesh were transferred to Madras in exchange for a smaller area, which was constituted into one taluk by the name of Sathyavedu, these two constituencies (one two-member and the other single-member) were replaced by a two-member assembly constituency of Sathyavedu. Consequently, the total number of seats in the Legislative Assembly of Andhra Pradesh was reduced from 301 to 300. Meanwhile, the Madras Legislative Assembly gained one seat, the total increasing from 205 to 206. A new assembly constituency called Tiruttani came into being in Madras and the extent and boundaries of Ponneri, Gummidipundi and Tiruvallur assembly constituencies were considerably altered.

== See also ==
- States Reorganisation Act
- Merger of Kanyakumari with Madras State
- History of Tamil Nadu
