= Karamana =

- Suburb
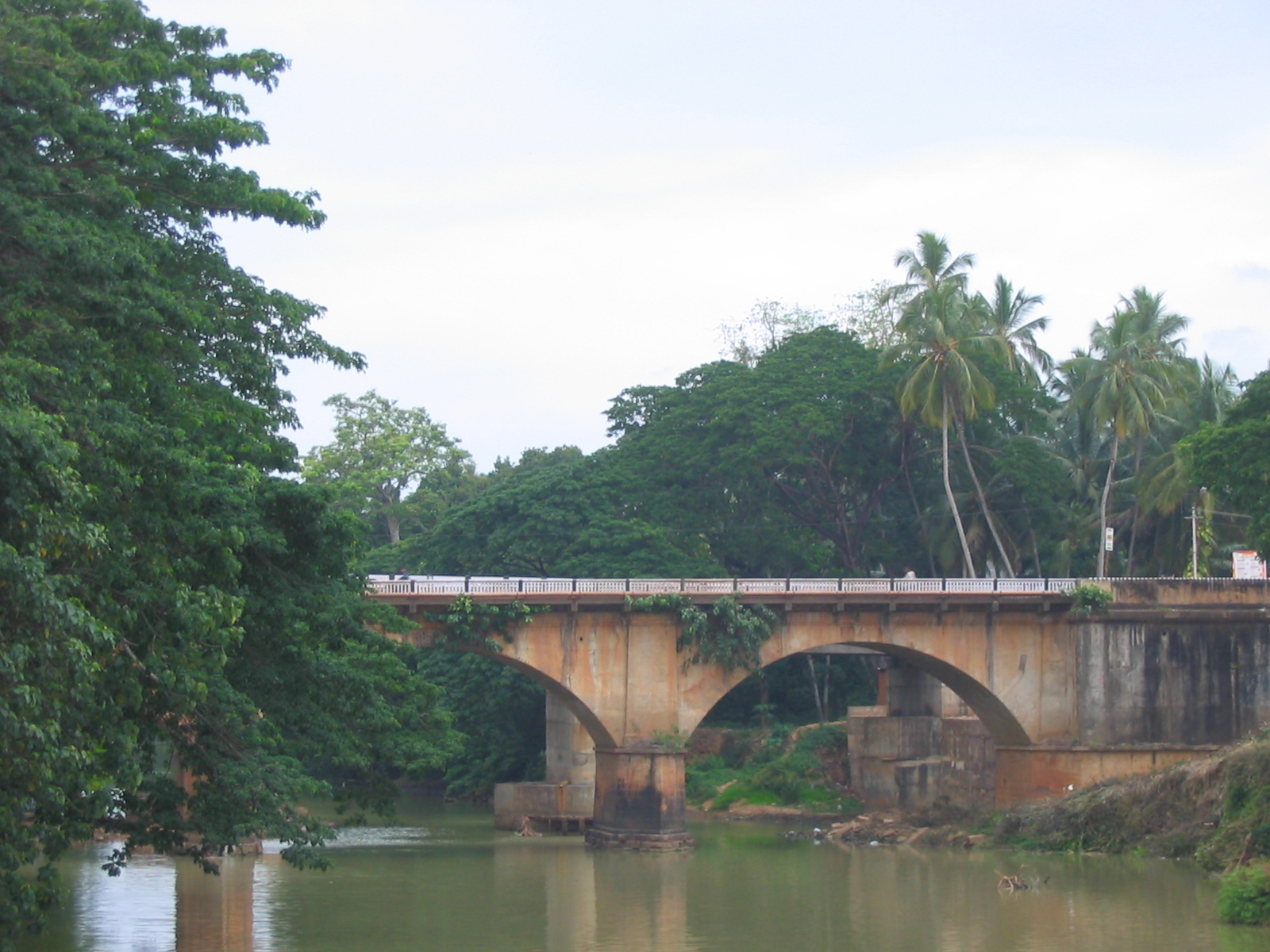
- Karamana old bridge

- Location in Kerala, India
- Coordinates: 8.503°N 76.952°E
- Country: India
- State: Kerala
- District: Thiruvananthapuram
- Talukas: Thiruvananthapuram

Languages
  - Official: Malayalam, English
- Time zone: UTC+5:30 (IST)
- PIN: 695002
- Vehicle registration: KL-01

Karamana is a suburb of Thiruvananthapuram, the capital city of Kerala, India. It is one of the most densely populated but green parts of Thiruvananthapuram. The land is serviced by the Karamana River, which originates from the southern tip of the Western Ghats at Agastya Mala. The river flows 68 kilometres (42 mi) westward and merges into the Arabian Sea at the Thiruvallom-Karumam area near Kovalam. Karamana is a major transit point for both trade and travel to and from the Kanyakumari district of neighbouring Tamil Nadu.

== Etymology ==
According to myths, the name Karamana came from a namboothiri (Kerala Brahmin) family who lived on the bank of the river Karamana from the words kara (lit. 'bank') and mana (lit. 'house').

== Civil society and administration ==
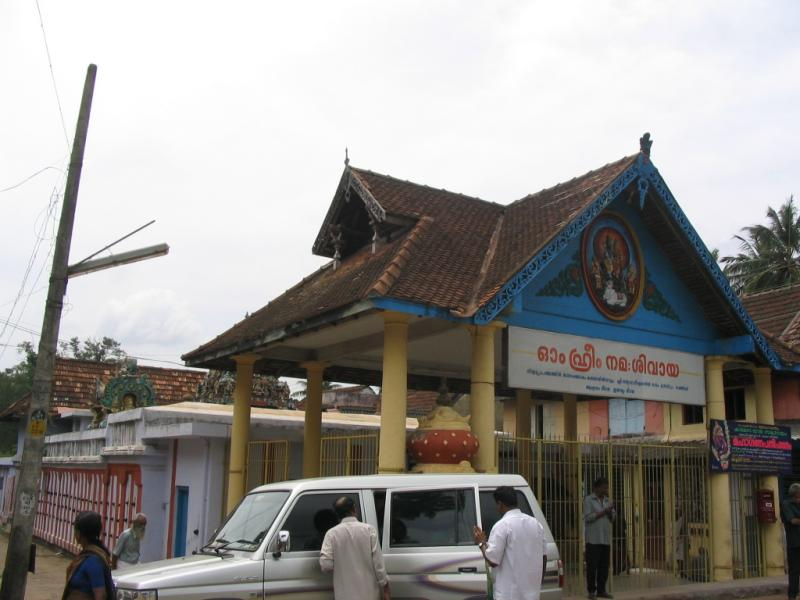
Famous Sivan Kovil

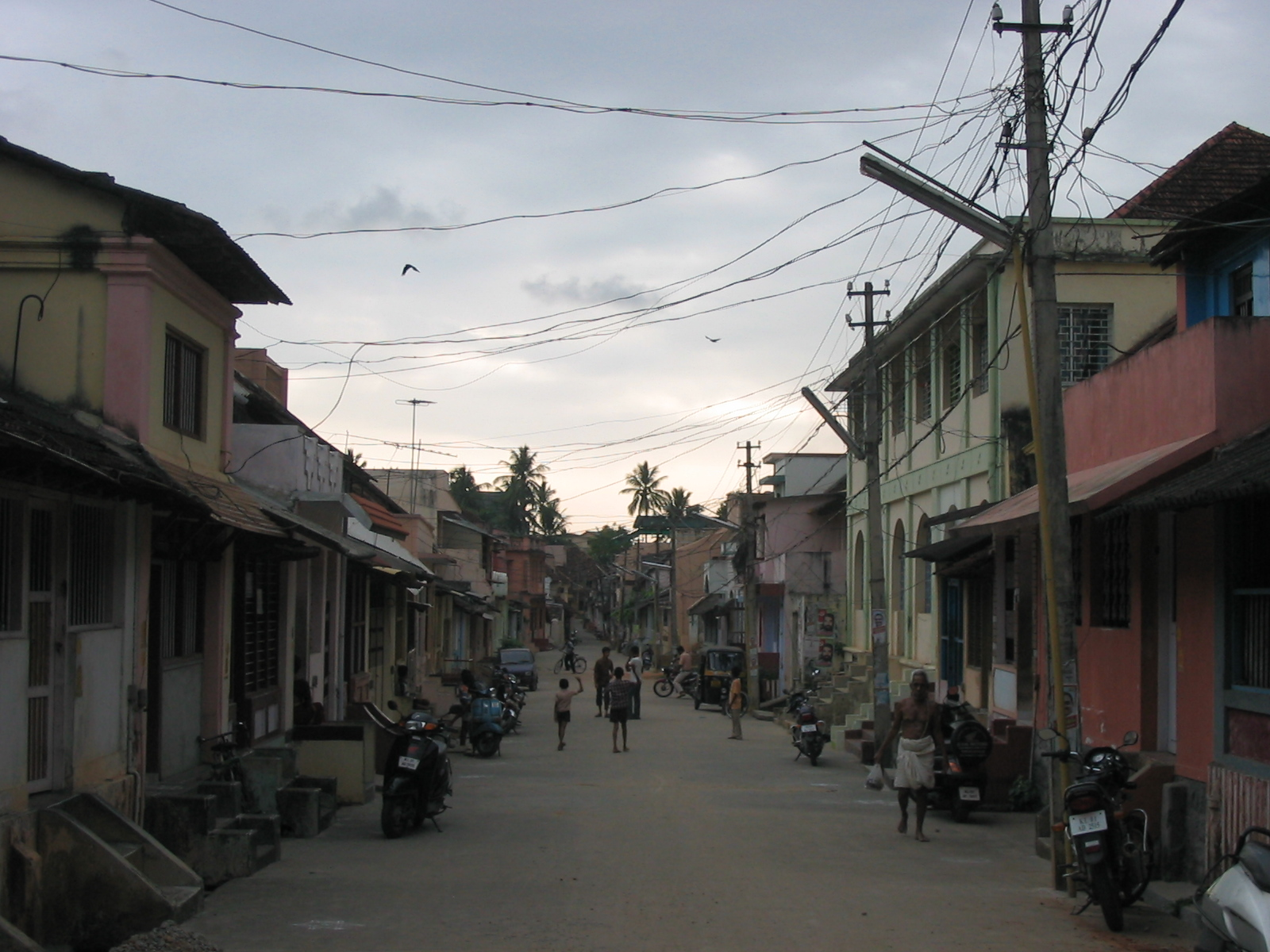
Typical wall sharing street - 'Theruvu' (Sankara Subbayyar Street)

Karamana is situated within the city limits of Thiruvananthapuram Corporation (TC). It is the 20th ward of TC and is represented by a councillor on the TC Council. Like most parts of Thiruvananthapuram, Karamana has a substantial non-Malayalam speaking population, which contributes to the vibrant culture of Thiruvananthapuram. National Highway 66, the main travel and trade corridor of Kerala, passes through Karamana onward to the Central business districts of Thiruvananthapuram.

== Notable people ==
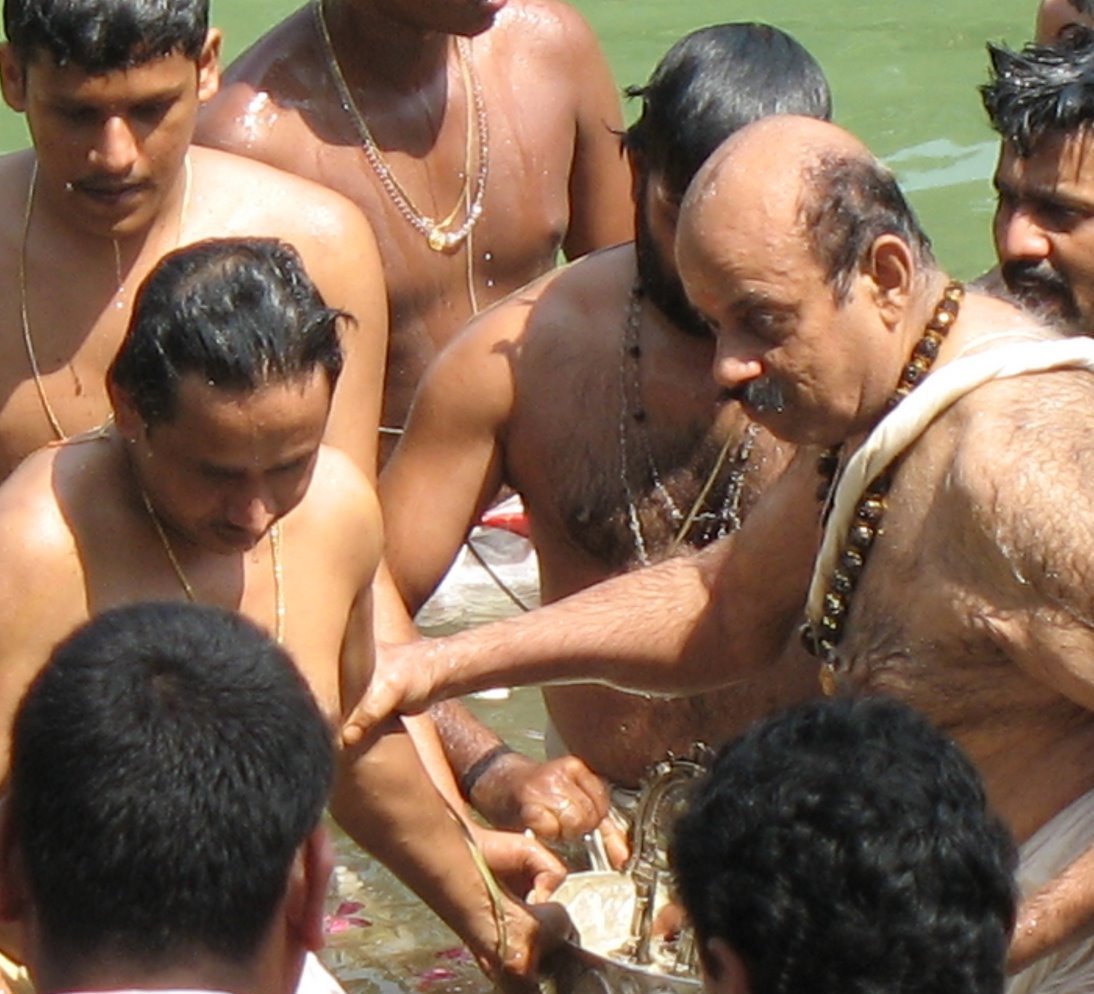
Aarattu

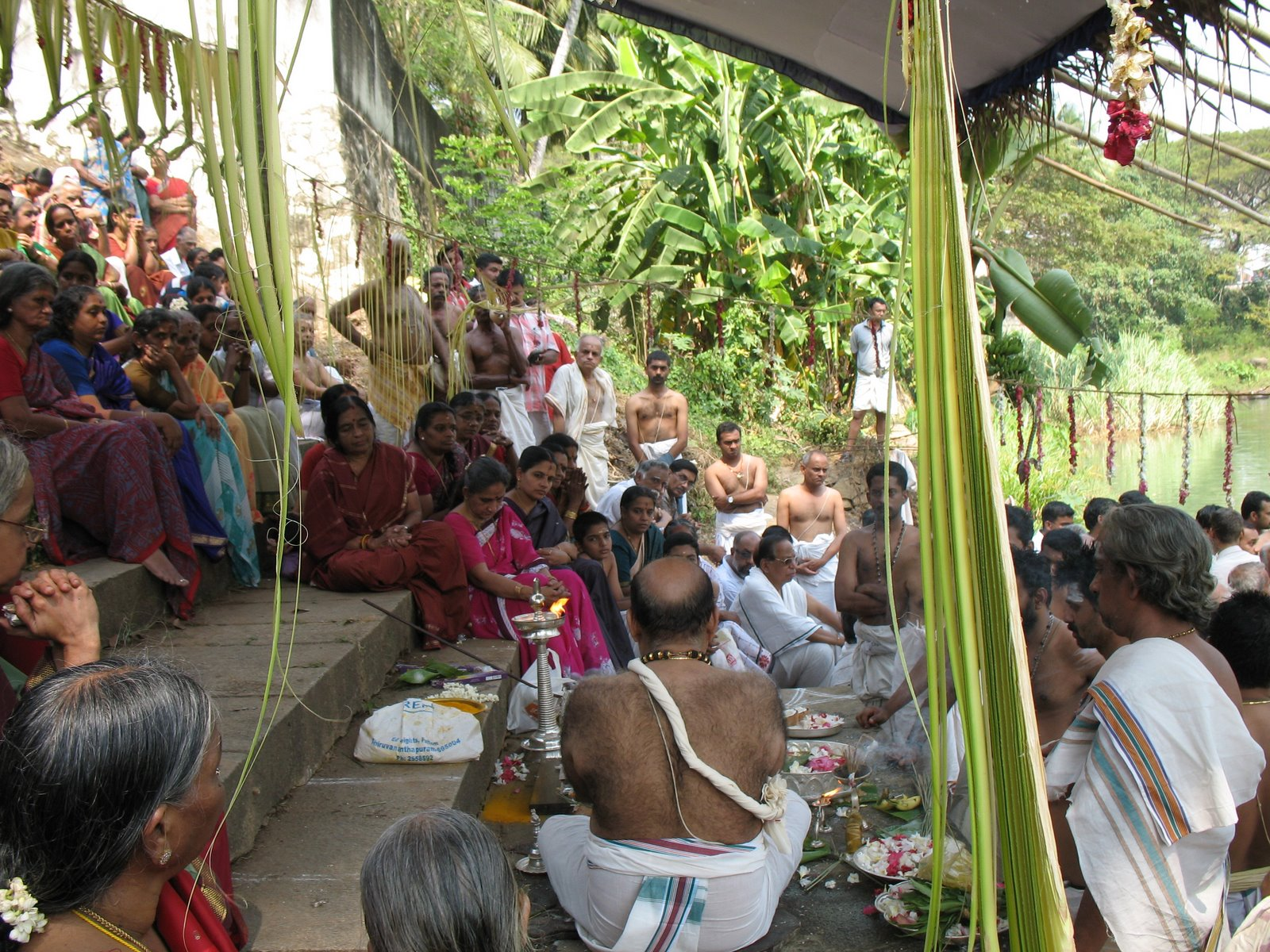
Thaipusam at the banks of Karamana River

Neelakanta Sivan, later known as Nilakanta Dasar, a Karamana resident, wrote many devotional songs in Tamil. His disciple, Papanasam Sivan was influenced by his compositions, and worked in the government until age 35, when he began composing lyrics in praise of Siva, creating over a thousand songs. He used "Nilakanta" as the mudra. He is especially known for his song "Lalitha Mahathmyam".

K. S. Chithra is an Indian playback singer and Carnatic musician. In a career spanning over four decades, she has recorded over 25,000 songs in various Indian languages, as well as foreign languages such as Malay, Latin, Arabic, Sinhalese, English, and French.

Mahesh Sambasivan, a neurosurgeon comes from Karamana. He devised a technique to operate posterior third-ventricular tumours, an extremely complex brain surgery procedure. He is also the Tantri of Sathyavageeswarar Temple (Sivan Kovil) and Durga Temple at Sreekanteswaram.

== Places of interest and topology ==
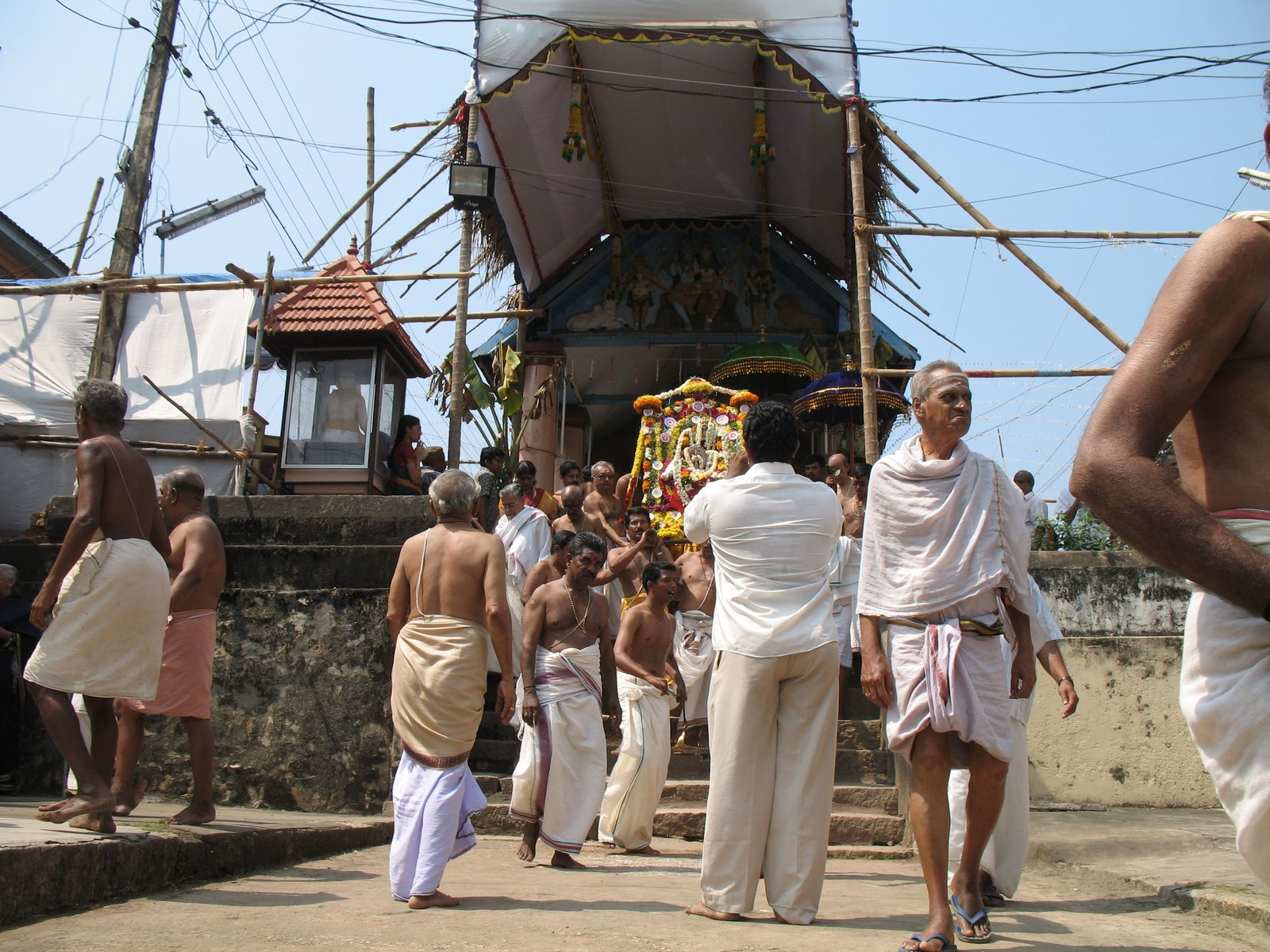
Thaipusam festival

Karamana houses the temple of Sri Satyavageeswara (Shiva) and the Mahadeva Temple of Thaliyal. Every year, an annual Thaipusam festival is held on the full moon in the month of January or February.

== See also ==
- Karamana Janardanan Nair
