= Pazhaya Sreekanteswaram Temple =

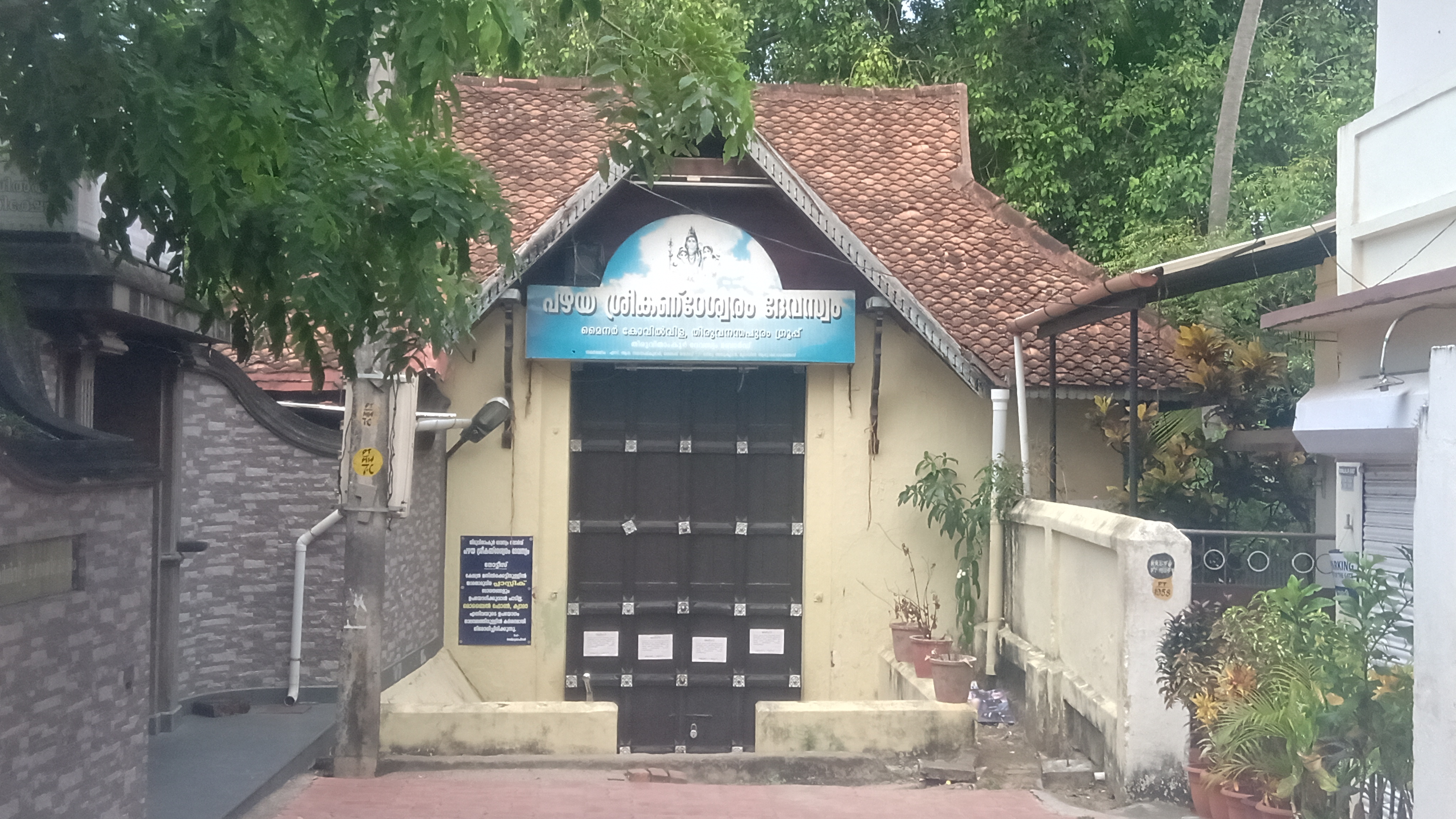

- Location in Kerala

Religion
- Affiliation: Hinduism
- District: Thiruvananthapuram
- Deity: Lord Shiva
- Festival: Maha Shivaratri

Location
- Location: Sreekanteswaram
- State: Kerala
- Country: India
- Coordinates: 8°29′15″N 76°56′36″E

Architecture
- Type: Dravidian architecture (Kovil)

Pazhaya Sreekanteswaram Temple or Old Sreekanteswaram Temple, located at Puthenchantha in Thiruvananthapuram, is an ancient Shiva & Vishnu temple in Kerala. According to historian Elamkulam Kunjan Pillai, the temple has existed since at least 1000 AD. This temple is the original abode of the Lord of the new Sreekanteswaram Mahadeva Temple. The new temple is situated just outside the "North Fort" in Thiruvananthapuram. According to M. G. Sasibhooshan, the old temple was on the route taken by the King of Travancore and his retinue in connection with the Pallivetta of the Sri Padmanabhaswamy Temple.

== Deities ==
Shiva is worshipped as a linga of Sreekanteswara, believed to be installed by Parashurama. According to devotees, the samadhi of Sage Kanwa is in the precincts of the temple. Chettikulam, a pond nearby that was reclaimed decades ago, is referred to in Syanandura Purana Samuchaya and Anantapura Varnana as Kanvatirtha. This led to the belief that Pazhaya Sreekanteswaram and Chettikulangara formed part of Kanwa Tapovana. Krishna was installed later to reduce the ferocity of Shiva. Ganesha and the serpent gods are worshipped in the temple. All the idols of the deities face east.

Mrityunjaya Homam, Mrityunjaya Archana, Jaladhara, Pinvilakku, and Kuvala Mala Samarpanam are the most popular offerings made to Shiva.

== Athiyara Eman and Yadavendran Thampuran ==
A saintly Brahmin from Vanchiyoor Athiyara Madhom was doing japam in the Old Sreekanteswaram Temple when a good-looking young Yadava prince started jala kreeda in the temple pond with a beautiful Sudra girl. Then, against her wishes, the prince carried her on his back into the Temple. The prince then forced himself upon the girl, and the latter cried out for help. Athiyara Potti rushed to rescue her and cursed the prince that he would turn into a half-man, half-horse and that he would be enslaved for many years. The prince fell at the feet of the Brahmin and sought forgiveness. The Brahmin said that the royal in his new form would be a slave for nine years and that in the tenth year he would earn the grace of Lord Sreekanteswara and attain salvation.

As the girl looked on, the prince was transformed into a handsome creature having a horse's body with the prince's head, arms, and torso in place of the head and neck of the horse. He was devastated and swore never to return to his palace. The girl fell head over heels in love with the transformed prince.

The Yadava prince approached the girl's brother and sought her hand in marriage. But her brother, who was then a boy, told the prince that he would grant permission only if the prince became his slave. The prince agreed, and the marriage was solemnized. Over the years, the prince had to endure a lot as the girl grew into a domineering wife and the boy into a sadistic master. But the prince never wished ill on his tormentors, but turned more and more towards Lord Sreekanteswara. In the tenth year, the Sudra master had a change of heart and released the prince from bondage.

The prince then met Athiyara Potti and sought his blessings. Athiyara Potti blessed the Yadava and accepted him as a disciple. The prince started worshipping Lord Sreekanteswara in His Kameswara form. Pleased with his devotion, Lord Kameswara and His consort Sree Lalitha Devi appeared before him and granted him salvation.

The Brahmin and the prince are popularly referred to as Athiyara Eman (Yajamanan) and Yadavendran Thampuran, respectively.

== Loss of importance ==
Pazhaya Sreekanteswaram might have lost its importance to the new temple in the 18th century when the mercenaries of Sri Padmanabhan Thampi, son of King Rama Varma and bete noire of Sri Anizhom Thirunal Marthanda Varma, were stationed at Kuthiravattom (a place near Pazhaya Sreekanteswaram).

Sri Anizhom Thirunal ascended the Throne of Travancore in 1729. Once Anizhom Thirunal left for Kollam, Padmanabhan Thampi took control of the capital Kalkkulam. Padmanabhan Thampi then marched to Thiruvananthapuram with his forces to appropriate the wealth of Sree Padmanabha Swamy Temple. Thampi stayed at Srivaraham with his cavalry stationed in Kuthiravattom. His attempts to amass wealth by collecting revenue due to the temple from the local people were stiffly opposed by Pallichal Pillai, cementing Thampi’s relinquishing of the venture.

== The Tantri of the temple ==
Vanchiyoor Athiyara Potti is the Tantri of the temple. The Potti is a hereditary member of the Ettara Yogam, which used to be the governing body of the Sree Padmanabhaswamy Temple.

== Important days ==
The temple attracts large crowds on Maha Shivaratri and Thiruvathira.

== The management of the temple ==
The temple is under the control of Travancore Devaswom Board. Before it was taken over by the Board, the temple belonged to a prominent Nair tharavad by the name of Kovilvila.

== Kovilvila Tharavad ==
Kovilvila Tharavad traces its roots to Valluvanad. Centuries ago, the Nair Tharavad had a Karanavar who was an advanced upasaka of Srividya sampradaya. He and his wife used a Meru Sreechakram for their worship. They had many disciples. Though they were revered by the people around, they were not in the good books of the ruler. Due to royal displeasure, the members of the tharavad had to flee to Pattazhi. From Pattazhi, they moved to Thiruvananthapuram and settled there. The Karanavar and his wife continued their upasana in the land of Sri Padmanabha. After leading fruitful lives, they reached the Divine Abode of Lalita Parameswari.

In the course of time, the family began to manage the affairs of Pazhaya Sreekanteswaram Temple. Years rolled by. Besides Sreechakram, the family started worshipping Bhadrakali of a kalari and the great Karanavar who had attained the lotus-feet of the Divine Mother. By the blessings of Sreekanteswara and the Household Deities, the family prospered and reached great heights. But succeeding generations did not have the required degree of piety. The family is believed to have incurred the wrath of the Guardian Deities. Kovilvila House, along with the chamber in which the Guardian Deities were installed, was reduced to ashes. Though the tharavad managed to rise from the ashes, it did not resume the upasana for many years.

== Kovilvila Bhagavati Temple ==
After an elaborate Ashtamangala Prasnam in December 2006, a new temple by the name Kovilvila Bhagavati Temple was constructed on a piece of land adjacent to Pazhaya Sreekanteswaram. This piece of land belonged to Kovilvila L Parukkutti Amma, the wife of Justice K. S. Govinda Pillai. The Guardian Deities of the tharavad—Kalari Bhadrakali, Meru Sreechakram, and Karanavar—were duly installed by the Tantri Thrippunithura Puliyannoor Murali Narayanan Nambuthiripad on 21 March 2008. One-hooded Nagaraja, five-hooded Nagayakshi, and Chitrakootam were installed by Amedamangalathu Vishnu Nambuthiri on the next day.

Offering Neyvilakku for eleven consecutive days is the most important vazhipadu in the Temple.

Being the day of installation of the Goddess, Uthram in the month of Meenom, is the most important day in the temple calendar. Women devotees offer Pongala on that day. Ayilyam in the month of Thulam is important for the Serpent gods.

== Murals in Kovilvila Bhagavati Temple ==
The Temple contains grand mural paintings of Kalari Bhadrakali and Lalita Parameswari. According to Dr. M.G.Sasibhooshan, the mural of Lalita Parameswari is one of the largest of its kind.

== Royal visit ==
Princess Aswathi Thirunal Gowri Lakshmi Bayi visited Pazhaya Sreekanteswaram Temple and Kovilvila Bhagavati Temple on 5 November 2013.

== See also ==
- List of Hindu temples in Kerala
- Kappazhom Raman Pillai
- Sreekanteswaram Mahadeva Temple
