= Vilavancode =

- census town
- Location in Tamil Nadu, India
- Coordinates: 8.3129°N 77.2048°E
- Country: India
- State: Tamil Nadu
- District: Kanyakumari

Government
  - Body: Vilavancode Panchayat

Area
  - Total: 4.02 km^{2} (1.55 sq mi)

Population (2011)
  - Total: 6,731
  - Density: 1,670/km^{2} (4,340/sq mi)

Languages
  - Official: Tamil
  - Minority: Malayalam
- Time zone: UTC+5:30 (IST)

Vilavancode, also spelt as Viḷavaṅgōḍu, is a town panchayat in Kanyakumari district in Tamil Nadu state, India. It is part of territory among several taluks that were with the Thiruvananthapuram district that with the passage of the States Reorganisation Act of 1956 transferred from Thiruvananthapuram district, Travancore-Cochin State to the newly created Kanyakumari district of Madras State (the latter later renamed as Tamil Nadu State).

== History ==
=== Boundary ===
Vilavancode was part of Travancore Kingdom, the latter which subsequently became part of the then Travancore-Cochin State. Part of The States Reorganisation Act of 1956 aligned state boundaries on linguistic affiliations. Thovalai, Kalkulam, Vilavancode, and Agastheeswaram Taluks were transferred from Thiruvananthapuram District of the Travancore-Cochin State to Kanyakumari district, Madras State. Madras was later renamed as Tamil Nadu).

== Religions ==
Religions in Vilavancode Taluka
Religion	Percent
Hindus	68.63%
Christians	28.45%
Muslims	2.48%
Others	0.44%

== Politics ==
Vilavancode assembly constituency is part of Kanyakumari Lok Sabha constituency.

== See also ==
- Pinanthode
