= Pinanthode =

- village
- Country: India
- State: Tamil Nadu
- District: Kanyakumari

Languages
  - Official: Tamil, Malayalam
- Time zone: UTC+5:30 (IST)

Pinanthode is a village near Thirparappu in the Indian state of Tamil Nadu, which is near the Tirparappu Waterfalls.
