= Sreekanteswaram Mahadeva Temple =

- Sreekanteswaram Mahadeva Temple, Thiruvananthapuram, Kerala

Religion
- Affiliation: Hinduism
- District: Thiruvananthapuram
- Deity: Lord Shiva

Location
- Location: Thiruvananthapuram
- State: Kerala
- Country: India
- Interactive map of Sreekanteswaram Mahadeva Temple
- Coordinates: 8°29′14.8″N 76°56′35.2″E

Architecture
- Type: Kerala traditional architecture

Specifications
- Temple: One
- Elevation: 33.71 m (111 ft)

Sreekanteswaram Mahadeva Temple is a Hindu temple of the god Shiva situated in Thiruvananthapuram, in the Indian state of Kerala. Pazhaya Sreekanteswaram Temple is considered the original abode of the god.

This temple is more than 700 years old.

== Deities ==
Shiva is the temple's presiding deity. Although his consort Parvati has no idol, she is said to be ever-present in the Sanctum. The deity is called Gowri Shankara (lit. "Shiva with Parvati"). A Sanctum for Sastha is within the Chuttambalam. Ganesha (Ganapati), the serpent gods and Krishna dwell outside the Chuttambalam. Many devotees argue that the idol worshipped as Bhootathan is actually a Yakshi. Hanuman (Anjaneya) and Murugan (Kartikeya), both carved on pillars near the flagmast, receive worship. All the deities face east.

Adjacent to the shrine of Ganapati stands an idol of Goddess Parashakti who was worshiped in a nearby Kalari. In the Kalari she was worshipped with 'makaara panchakam' in the Shakteya Sampradaya.

== Legend ==
As per legend, an old woman sweeper of Pazhaya Sreekanteswaram Temple distinguished the Swyambhoo (self manifested) Shiva Linga idol while she was resting at this place. She got 'Darshan' (vision) of Shiva at the spot.

== Main Offerings ==
Many devotees attend the Nirmalya Darshan.

Mritunjaya Homam, Mrityunjaya archana, Jaladhara, Pinvilakku and Kuvala mala samarpanam are the most popular offerings made to Shiva.

Ganapathy Homam, Mrithyunjaya Homam, Mrithyunjayarchana, Abhishekam, Dhara, Pushpabhishekam, Neerajanam, Venna Charthu for AnjaneyaSwamy, Ashtothararchana, Sahasranamarchana, Nateshalankaram.

== Festivals ==
The annual festival lasts for ten days and will be celebrated in the Malayalam month Dhanu (Dec-Jan). The Aarattu will be on Thiruvathira Star day which is considered as the birthday of Shiva. Shivarathri festival is also celebrated in a grand manner. Anointing the idol of Lord Shiva with pure ghee throughout the day is performed on that day.

Maha Shivaratri and Thiruvathira attract crowds to the temple and Thiruvathira day of Malayalam month Dhanu.

== Management ==
The temple is under the control of Travancore Devaswom Board.
