= Vilavancode taluk =

Coordinates: 8°20′42″N 77°02′31″E

Vilavancode taluk is a taluk located in Kanyakumari district, Tamil Nadu, India. The headquarters of the taluk is the town of Vilavancode. The taluk was among several in Thiruvananthapuram district that with the passage of the States Reorganisation Act of 1956 were transferred from Thiruvananthapuram district, Travancore-Cochin State to the newly created Kanyakumari district of Madras State (the latter later renamed as Tamil Nadu State). The present Tahsildar of Vilavancode is Mr. Abraham Denny

== History ==
=== Boundary ===
Vilavancode taluk was part of the Princely state Travancore Kingdom; the latter which subsequently became part of the then Travancore-Cochin State. Part of The States Reorganisation Act of 1956 aligned state boundaries on linguistic affiliations. Thovalai, Kalkulam, Vilavancode, and Agastheeswaram taluks were transferred from Thiruvananthapuram district of the Travancore-Cochin state to Kanyakumari district, Madras State. Madras was later renamed as Tamil Nadu).

== Demographics ==
According to the 2011 census, Vilavancode taluk had a population of 587,924 with 290,860 males and 297,064 females. There were 1021 women for every 1000 men. The taluk had a literacy rate of 82.43. Child population in the age group below 6 was 27,715 Males and 26,478 Females.

According to the 2011 census, Majority of people follow Christianity by 58.45% of population. Hinduism is second largest religion followed by 38.63% of population, Islam By 2.48% Other religions like Jainism, Sikhism, etc are followed by 0.44%. Most of the Christians are Roman Catholic.

Religions in Vilivancode Taluka
Religion	Percent
Christians	58.45%
Hindus	38.63%
Muslims	2.48%
Others	0.44%
