= Kalkulam taluk =

Coordinates: 9°46′N 78°44′E

Kallkkulam taluk is a taluk of Kanyakumari district of the Indian state of Tamil Nadu. The headquarters of the taluk is the town of Kallkkulam.Up to 1957, Kallkkulam Taluk formed part of the Travancore Kingdom and subsequently the Travancore-Cochin State. It was when the States were divided on linguistic basis that Kallkkulam, Thovalai, Vilavancode, and Agastheeswaram Taluks of the erstwhile Thiruvananthapuram District of the then Travancore-Cochin State were included in the then Madras State (later renamed as Tamil Nadu) as Kanyakumari District.

Kallkkulam taluk has been an important administrative division of the erstwhile Travancore Kingdom. Padmanabhapuram, the erstwhile capital of Travancore State is situated with in Kallkkulam Taluk. It was at Kallkkulam that Maharaja Marthanda Verma of Travancore Kingdom (the then Venad Kingdom) executed the eight Nair feudal Lords Ettuveetil Pillamar who challenged his authority to the throne.

== Demographics ==
According to the 2011 census, the taluk of Kallkkulam had a population of 603,918 with 303,913 males and 300,005 females. There were 987 women for every 1000 men. The taluk had a literacy rate of 84.77. Child population in the age group below 6 was 24,542 Males and 23,696 Females.
