= Agastheeswaram taluk =

Administrative division in Kanyakumari, Tamil Nadu, India

Coordinates: 8°06′03″N 77°31′15″E

Agasteeswaram taluk is a taluk located in Kanyakumari district, Tamil Nadu, India. The headquarters of the taluk is the town of Nagercoil. The taluk was among several in Thiruvananthapuram district that with the passage of the States Reorganisation Act of 1956 were transferred from Thiruvananthapuram district, Travancore-Cochin State to the newly created Kanyakumari district of Madras State (the latter later renamed as Tamil Nadu State).

== History ==
=== Boundary ===
The taluk was part of the Princely state Travancore Kingdom; the latter which subsequently became part of the then Travancore-Cochin State. Part of The States Reorganisation Act of 1956 aligned state boundaries on linguistic affiliations. Thovalai, Kalkulam, Vilavancode, and Agastheeswaram taluks were transferred from Thiruvananthapuram District of the Travancore-Cochin State to newly formed Kanyakumari district under Madras State. Madras was later renamed as Tamil Nadu.

== Demographics ==
According to the 2011 census, the taluk had a population of 550,283 with 271,936 males and 278,347 females. There were 1024 women for every 1000 men. The taluk had a literacy rate of 85.63%. Child population in the age group below 6 was 24,950 males and 24,164 females.
