= Perunthanni =

- Town
- Location in Kerala, India
- Coordinates: 8°29′42″N 76°55′45″E
- Country: India
- State: Kerala
- District: Thiruvananthapuram

Languages
  - Official: Malayalam, English
- Time zone: UTC+5:30 (IST)
- PIN: 695008
- Telephone code: 0471
- Vehicle registration: KL-01

Perunthanni is a suburb of Thiruvananthapuram, the capital of the Indian state of Kerala. This place is situated on Vetti Muricha Kotta-Westfort-Enchakkal Road.

== Geography ==
It is located at.

== Places near Perunthanni ==
Perunthanni surrounded by Palkulanagara, Eanchakkal and Sreekanteswaram.

== Religion ==
The population of Perunthanni mainly practices Hinduism.

== Main Landmarks ==
- West Fort
- NSS Public School
- NSS Arts College for Women
- Arumana Hospital
- Archives Office
