= Kaithamukku =

Kaithamukku is a neighbourhood in the city of Thiruvananthapuram (Trivandrum), India. Kaithamukku is home of the Trivandrum Passport Office.

Kaithamukku is a busy residential and commercial area in Thiruvananthapuram. It is bordered by Pulimoodu on the east, Fort on the south, Pettah on the north, and Palkulangara on the west. It is around 1.5 km from Trivandrum Central railway station and KSRTC bus stand, and 1.0 km from East Fort and 2 km from Statue Junction. The international airport is 3 km away. The Trivandrum Passport Office (Old) and Karalkada, Ideal home appliances are the major landmarks. A district court, police station, and collectorate are within 500 metres.
