= Thovalai taluk =

Thovalai (also spelt Thovala) is a taluk of Kanyakumari district in the Indian state of Tamil Nadu. The headquarters of the taluk is the town of Boothapandi.

== Demographics ==
According to the 2011 census, the taluk of Thovala had a population of 121,049 with 60,091 males and 60,958 females. There were 1,014 women for every 1,000 men. The taluk had a literacy rate of 82.45%. Child population in the age group below 6 years were 5,379 Males and 5,032 Females.

== Thidal (திடல்) ==
Thidal (Theradu / Kezhathidal / Kezhatheradu) is one of the smallest villages in Thovali Taluk of Kanyakumari District, Tamil Nadu. The nearest village is Rethinapuram. The village is covered by mountains in its all the four sides. Kadukarai is located to its west.

== Villages ==
Thovalai village is famous for its flower garden and flower market. Flowers are exported to adjacent cities and Kerala state from here. Also it is a shooting spot for Tamil movies. Aralvaimozhy is famous for the wind electric production. It is the South Asia's biggest site for wind energy. Tamil is the main language spoken. Most of the area is covered by mountains and the south tip of the western ghats ends here. The list of villages are below:

1. Ananthapuram
2. Aralvoimozhy
3. Arumanalloor
4. Ashamboo
5. Azhakiapandiapuram
6. Beemanagari-Vp
7. Buthapandi
8. Erachakulam-Vp
9. Esanthimangalam-Vp
10. Gnalam-Vp
11. Kadukkarai-Vp
12. Kattupudur-Vp
13. Mahendragiri
14. Mathavalayam
15. Poigaimalai
16. Sahaya Nagar
17. Chenbagaramanpudur
18. Thadaga Malai
19. Thadikkarankonam-Vp
20. Thazhakudi
21. Thekkumalai (East)
22. Thekkumalai (West)
23. Thellanthi -Vp
24. Therisanamcoppu-Vp
25. Thittuvilai
26. Thidal (Ananthapuram)
27. Thidal (Ananthapuram, Hariharaputrar Estate)
28. Thidal (Ananthapuram, Sengamal Estate)
29. Thiruppathisaram-Vp
30. Thovalai
31. Veerapuli
