= Kalkulam =

Neighbourhood in Kanyakumari district, Tamil Nadu, India

- village
- Location in Tamil Nadu, India Kalkulam (India)
- Coordinates: 8.183°N 77.315°E
- Country: India
- State: Tamil Nadu
- District: Kanyakumari

Government
  - Body: Gram panchayat

Languages
  - Official: Tamil
  - Minority: Malayalam
- Time zone: UTC+5:30 (IST)
- Nearest city: Nagercoil

Kalkulam is a small village located in Kalkulam taluk, Kanyakumari district, Tamil Nadu, India. The taluk was among several in Thiruvananthapuram district that, with the passage of the States Reorganisation Act of 1956, were transferred from Thiruvananthapuram district, Travancore-Cochin State, to the newly created Kanyakumari district of Madras State (the latter later renamed as Tamil Nadu State).

== History ==
=== Boundary ===
Kalkulam Taluk was part of the Princely state Travancore Kingdom; the latter which subsequently became part of the then Travancore-Cochin State. Part of The States Reorganisation Act of 1956 aligned state boundaries on linguistic affiliations. Thovalai, Kalkulam, Vilavancode, and Agastheeswaram Taluks were transferred from Thiruvananthapuram District of the Travancore-Cochin State to Kanyakumari district, Madras State. Madras was later renamed as Tamil Nadu).

== Demographics ==
Religions in Kalkulam Taluka
Religion	Percent
Hindus	65.72%
Christians	32.17%
Muslims	4.81%
Others	0.29%

As per the 2001 census, Kalkulam had a total population of 6,509 with 3,121 males and 3,388 females. The literacy rate was 83.55.

== Religious importance ==
One of the temples of Shivalaya ottam is at Kalkulam.

== Education ==
Amala Convent is an old institution which is administrated by a local church. Devi Matriculation School is located near to the Thuckalay bus stand. Hindu Vidyalaya is near Kollen Villai. Noorul Islam College of Engineering is the nearest engineering college, and is located at Kumarakoil, approximately 4 km from Thuckalay.

== Tourism ==
The Padmanabhapuram Palace is located 1 km from Thuckalay Town. The palace is built in the Travancore architectural style, containing 17th and 18th century murals, and underground passages.

The Dutch commander Eustachius De Lannoy was buried in a nearby place called Udayagiri Fort.

== Notable people ==
- Sukumari

== See also ==
- Poliyoorkurchy
