= Kumarapuram =

- Panchayat town
- Location in Tamil Nadu, India
- Coordinates: 8°15′12″N 77°21′27″E
- Country: India
- State: Tamil Nadu
- District: Kanyakumari

Population (2001)
  - Total: 13,759

Languages
  - Official: Tamil
- Time zone: UTC+5:30 (IST)
- Postal code: 629164

Kumarapuram is a panchayat town in the southern Kanyakumari district of Tamil Nadu, India.

== History ==
Kumarapuram was once part of the Travancore Kingdom. After the States Reorganisation Act was passed, it became a part of the state of Tamil Nadu. It was once ruled by Nair community members, but after the 1950s, it became occupied by the Tamils . Many old temples are situated around the area alongside newer churches and mosques. The town was once under the control of Manalikara Madam Nambudiris.

== Demographics ==
According to the 2019 census, Kumarapuram has a population of 14,728, of which 7,388 are males while 7,340 are females. Children make up 10% of the population. The religious demographic of Kumarapuram is as follows: 68.33% Christian, 26.45% Hindu and 5.04% are Muslim.

Kumarapuram has an average literacy rate of 88.5%, which is lower than the district average of 91.7% and higher than the national average of 74.37%. Male and female literacy are 91.03% and 86.03% respectively.11% of the population is under 6 years of age. The Postal Index Number is 629189. Both Malayalam and Tamil languages are spoken in the village, as well as some English in certain schools.

Its state assembly is situated in the Kanyakumari district, which also includes parts of Kodhanaloor and Velimalai. It is located between Thovalai, Thiruvattar, Verkilambi, and Kodhanallur.

== Religion ==
There are several temples and churches in Kumarapuram.

== Topography ==
The area receives very heavy rainfall throughout the entire year. The Veli Malai hills are the tallest mountains in the area, and they also host a temple of Lord Murugan.

== Notable people ==
- Veteran Malayalam poet and lyricist S. Ramesan Nair was born in Kumarapuram on 3 May 1948. He is the last surviving of the Malayalam poets from the Kanyakumari district since the district is now part of Tamil Nadu.
