= Kanyakumari district =

- District of Tamil Nadu
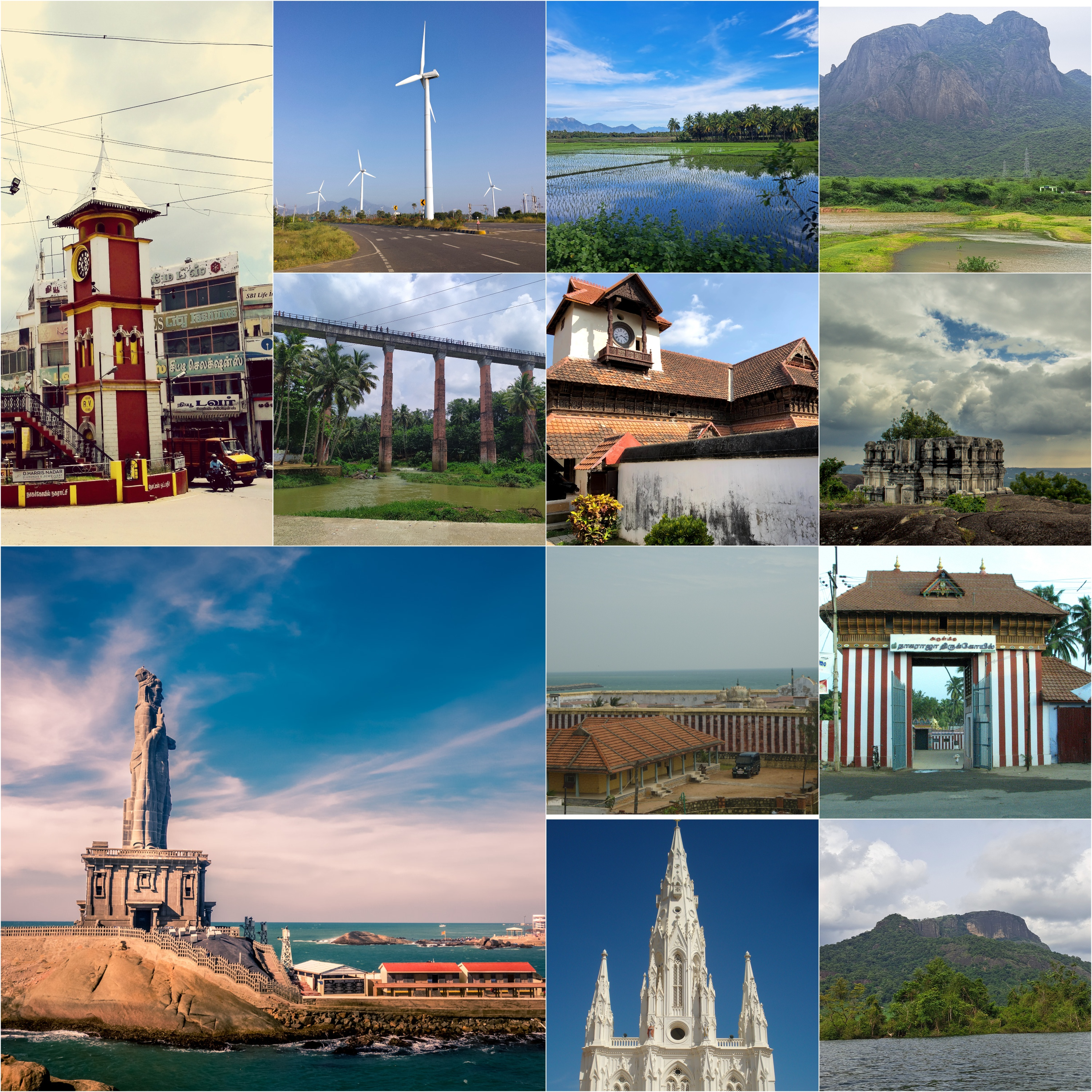
- Montage of Kanyakumari district
- Interactive map of Kanyakumari district
- Coordinates: 8.32°N 77.34°E
- Country: India
- State: Tamil Nadu
- District: Kanyakumari
- Headquarters: Nagercoil
- Taluks: 1. Agastheeswaram, 2. Kalkulam, 3. Thovalai, 4. Vilavancode, 5. Killiyur, 6. Thiruvattar

Government
  - District Collector: M. Prathap, I.A.S
  - Superintendent of Police: R. Stalin, I.P.S
  - District Forest Officer: M. illayaraja, I.F.S
  - District Panchayat chairman: S. Merliant Dhas

Area
  - Total: 1,672 km^{2} (646 sq mi)

Population (2011)
  - Total: 1,870,374
  - Density: 1,119/km^{2} (2,897/sq mi)

Languages
  - Official: Tamil
  - Minority: Malayalam
- Time zone: UTC+5:30 (IST)
- PIN: 629 xxx
- Telephone code: 04651 & 04652
- Vehicle registration: TN-74 for Nagercoil & TN-75 for Marthandam
- Coastline: 72 kilometres (45 mi)
- Sex ratio: M-1000/F-1014 ♂/♀
- Literacy: 97.6%
- Legislature type: Elected
- Current Member of Parliament (M.P): Vijay Vasanth
- Lok Sabha constituency: Kanniyakumari
- Legislative Assembly Constituencies (6 M.L.A): 1. N. Thalavai Sundaram (Kanyakumari); 2. S. Austin (Nagercoil); 3. T. T. Praveen (vilavancode); 4. R. Chellaswamy (Padmanabhapuram); 5. Tharahai Cuthbert (Colachel); 6. S. Rajeshkumar (Killiyoor)
- Precipitation: 2,382 millimetres (93.8 in)
- Avg. summer temperature: 31 °C (88 °F)
- Avg. winter temperature: 22 °C (72 °F)
- Central location: 8°03′N 77°15′E
- Website: kanniyakumari.nic.in

Kanyakumari district (Tamil: [kɐnːijaːkumaːɾi]), officially Kanniyakumari district, is one of the 38 districts of Tamil Nadu state and the southernmost district in mainland India. It has the second highest population density among the districts of Tamil Nadu, and is the richest in terms of per capita income. It has the highest Human Development Index (HDI), literacy, and education rate in the state. The district's headquarters is Nagercoil.

Kanyakumari district has a varied topography, with the Arabian sea on three sides and the mountains of the Western Ghats bordering the northern side, apart from a small stretch of land to the east of Kanyakumari town. It is the only district in Tamil Nadu state facing the Arabian Sea.

Historically, Nanjinad and Edai Nadu, which composed the present-day Kanyakumari district, were ruled by various Tamil and Malayalam dynasties: the Cheras; the Ay, Venad and Travancore rulers; the Pandyas; the Cholas; and the Nayaks. A few artefacts have been unearthed by archaeological excavations.

The district was part of the princely state of Travancore during the colonial times prior to India's independence: four of the eight tehsils of Thiruvananthapuram district were separated from the erstwhile Travancore Kingdom to form the new district of Kanyakumari and were made a part of the Madras Presidency under recommendations from the States Reorganisation Commission in 1956.

Kanyakumari district is the birthplace of Ayyavazhi. Many historical assumptions associate sages such as Agastya, Vyasa, Tolkappiyar, Avvaiyar and Valluvar with the district.

== Etymology ==
The place derives its name from the goddess Kanya Kumari, considered to be the sister of Krishna. The goddess is believed to remove the rigidity from the mind, and women pray for marriage at her temple. In 1656, the Dutch East India Company conquered Portuguese Ceylon from the Portuguese East Indies, and the name eventually corrupted to "Comorin" and was called "Cape Comorin" during British rule in India. In 2016, the town and its district were renamed to "Kanniyakumari" by the Government of India and the Government of Madras.

== History ==
=== Medieval ===
The area constituting Kanyakumari district was a part of the Ay kingdom during the first and second Sangam ages. Following the decline of the Ay kingdoms, the area became Venad and Padmanabhapuram became the capital.

=== 1600s–1800s ===
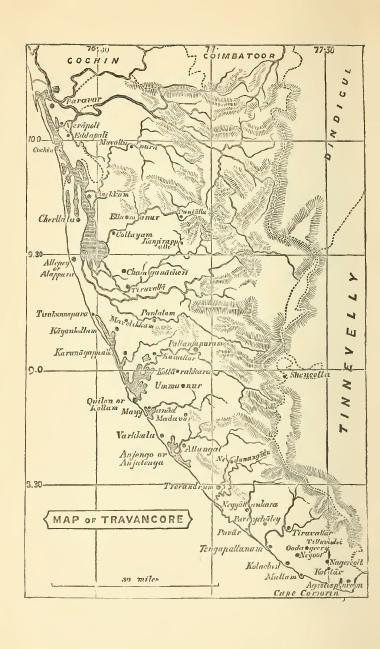
A map of Travancore in 1871

The wealth of the Nanjilnadu brought many invading kings during the reign of Umayamma Rani in the 1600s.

The Venad region was in anarchy when Marthanda Varma ascended the throne in 1729. Under his rule anarchy was still dominant in Kanyakumari region. However, Marthanda Varma bought portions of Kanyakumari from the then viceroy and brought under control the sense of disorder by annexing the nearby territories, putting down the feudal lords and establishing the state of Travancore. The famous battle of Colachel took place in the district. Later, the Maharajas of Travancore built the forts at Aramboly (Aralvaimozhy) to prevent any invasion from the Carnatic Kings. Key elements of Velu Thampi Dalawa's revolt occurred in the area and the English East India company's army under Col. Leger broke through the fortifications and entered Travancore in 1810.

=== 1900s ===
In 1949, the area became a part of the reestablished Travancore Cochin state. The people of Agasteeswarem, Thovalai, Kalkulam and Vilavancode taluks, which formed the southern divisions of the former district of Trivandrum, were predominantly Tamil speaking people. The present Kanyakumari district was historically part of the erstwhile Travancore State. Four Tamil-speaking taluks – Vilavancode, Kalkulam, Thovala and Agastheeswaram – which now form the Kanyakumari district, were transferred to Madras State on 1 November 1956. The changes that were effected between the taluks and the villages as of 1 October 1956 are furnished in the fly-leaf to Table A-I of the 1961 Census. An extreme agitation by Tamil speaking residents under the leadership of Marshal Nesamony included Kanyakumari within Tamil Nadu. Eventually the merger happened in 1956 based on language reorganisation of states.

Nanjilnadu (Agastheeswaram and Thovalai taluks) and Eda Nadu (Vilavancode and Kalkulam taluks) historically composed what is now Kanyakumari district. They were ruled by various dynasties: Venad Kingdom, Travancore Kingdom, the Cheras, the Cholas, the Ays and the Nayaks. The district was part of the princely state of Travancore during the colonial times prior to India's independence. Four of the eight tehsils of Thiruvananthapuram district were separated to form the new district of Kanyakumari in 1956 following the demands of reunion made by the Tamil speaking majority (about 70% of the population), who felt their feelings were suppressed by the Travancore Kingdom which had a Malayalam-majority population. The four taluks were made a part of Madras State under recommendations from the States Reorganisation Commission in 1956. Madras State was later renamed Tamil Nadu in 1969.

=== Religion ===
The district is the birthplace of Ayyavazhi, the henotheistic belief initiated by Hari Gopalan Seedar, one among the five prime disciples of Ayya Vaikundar. The social, religious and cultural history of the 19th century Kanyakumari district is intrinsically intertwined with those of Ayyavazhi. Many historical assumptions persist in the district and state, which associate with sages namely Vyasa, Agastya, Tolkappiyar, Avvaiyar and Valluvar.

=== Legend ===
According to a Hindu legend, Kanya Devi, an avatar of Parvati, was to marry Shiva, who failed to show up on his wedding day. Rice and other grains meant for the wedding feast remained uncooked and unused. The uncooked grains turned into stones as time went by. Some believe that the small stones on the shore today, which look like rice, are indeed grains from the wedding that was never solemnised. Kanya Devi is now considered a virgin goddess who blesses pilgrims and tourists who flock to the town. Her temple in Kanyakumari is a Shakta pitha: a holy shrine in the Shaktism tradition of Hinduism.

According to another Hindu legend, Hanuman dropped a piece of earth near Kanyakumari as he was carrying a mountain with his life-saving herb, Mrita Sanjivani, from the Himalayas to Lanka (Sri Lanka) during the Ramayana War. The fallen earth formed an area called Marunthuvazh Malai, literally "hills where medicine lives". This legend explains the abundance of unique native medicinal plants in the area. Marunthuvazh Malai is located near Kottaram, about 7 km (4 mi) from Kanyakumari town on the Kanyakumari–Nagercoil highway. According to a combination of geographical landmarks, regional mythology, ancient Tamil texts, and local tribal oral histories the sage Agasthya, who was an expert in medicinal herbs, is believed to have lived around this site in ancient days. There is an ashram on the middle of the hillside; tourists trek up to visit the ashram and to glimpse the sea near Kanyakumari town, a few kilometres away.

== Geography ==
The district is approximately 77°15' and 77°36' east longitude and 8°03' and 8°35' north latitude. The district borders Tirunelveli district in the north and northeast, the Gulf of Mannar in the east, the Indian Ocean in the south, the Arabian Sea in the west and Thiruvananthapuram District (Kerala) in the west.

Kanyakumari district has a varied topography with sea on three sides and the mountains of the Western Ghats bordering the northern side.

It can be categorised into three natural divisions: Mountainous terrain, in the northern parts of Vilavancode and Kalkulam taluks, including several large hills and an extension of a larger mountain range to the north; the coastal region, stretching along the southern, south-eastern and south-western parts of the district, fringed with coconut trees and predominantly sandy with occasional slightly elevated patches of red cliffs; and the plains area between the mountainous terrain and the coast, along with valleys interspersed with rivers and streams.

Within the northern mountain range of the district lies the Muthukuzhivayal range. South of Peerumedu, this range is very wide. The landscape has bluff ridges and conical peaks, continuing the Western Ghats and stretching to the Aralvaimozhi Pass. A broken rocky spur forms the Marunthuvazh Malai to the south, approximately 7 kilometres northwest of Kanyakumari. The Vellimalai in Kalkulam taluk and the Marunthuvazh Malai in Agastheeswaram taluk are important isolated hills. The tallest hill within the district is Mahendragiri (1,654 meters) in Thovalai taluk, situated on the border between Kanyakumari and Tirunelveli districts. Kalmalai (900 meters), Moliyadi (700 meters; located at the head of old Kulasekaram reserved forest area) and Tadakai malai (960 meters) are some of the notable hills in the district.

The mountainous terrain in the northern and eastern portions of the district contains an extensive plateau amid elevated hilltops. Most of the hills have steep slopes, though some have a more gradual spread. While the area is predominantly agricultural, it contains many plantations and a few handloom industries. The central area of the district, particularly Agasteeswaram taluk, consists of vast plains, suhc as the plains at Vellimalai, Mylaudy and Derisanamcope.

The district has a 71.5 kilometre coastline. Predominantly regular in its configuration, the coast showcases notable projections toward the sea at locations such as Kanyakumari, Muttam, and Erayanthurai. Additionally, there are a few minor sea ports. The ancient port of Colachel is the sole natural port on the west coast of Tamil Nadu while Kanyakumari serves as another minor port, primarily catering to tourists. Another minor port is located along the edge of Manakudi Estaury. Kanyakumari is the only district in Tamil Nadu facing the Arabian Sea.

=== Rivers ===
Pazhayar, the southernmost river in India, originates from Mahendragiri peak in the secondary range of the Western Ghats. The Pazhayar supports irrigation in Thovalai and Agastiswaram taluks. It is approximately 37 kilometres long, joining the Manakkudy Lagoon at Thamaraikulam. Notable places along the river include Boothapandi, Thalakudi, Vadasseri, Nagercoil, and Suchindram.

Kodayar originates east of Valia Malai peak within the southern part of the Muthukuzhivayal plateau and flows southwest. Two streams—one from Motavan Pothai and the other from Thacchamala hills—contribute to the river. The Pechiparai Dam intercepts the Kodayar to create the Pachipparai lake. The Tirparappu Waterfalls along this river stand at approximately 13 meters. After covering 32 kilometres in Kalkulam and Vilavancode taluks, the Kodayar merges with the Paraliyar to form the western Tambaraparani. It flows southwest through Kuzhithurai, Munchirai and eventually into the Thengapattanam estuary where it meets the sea.

Originating north of Mahendragiri, the Paraliyar flows southwest and passes out of the forest area a mile above Ponmanai where it encounters the Perunchani Dam. The Left Bank Channel supplies water from the Pechipparai reservoir before reaching the weir known as Puthen dam. The ancient Pandyan dam, built in the Pandiyan era is a part of one of the region's ancient irrigation systems. About a kilometre downstream from the Pandyan dam, the river meets the 250-year-old Puthen dam. The river runs through the Kalkulam and Vilavancode taluks and covers 37 kilometres before joining the Kodayar near Thiruvattar, forming the western Thamirabarani River.

Valliyar, a minor river, originates at an altitude of 950m in the Velimalai hills and passes through Kothanalloor, Kalkulam, Eraniel, Thalakulam and Manavalakurichi before joining the Arabian Sea at Kadiapattanam. It merges with the Thuvalar, another small river originating from the Mampazhathurai hills. Mullayar, another minor river, flows approximately 11 kilometres through Vilavancode taluk and joins the western Tambraparani near Thikkurichi.

== Geology ==
Geologically, the landmass of the district is much younger than the rest of state – it faulted as late as 2.5 million years during the Miocene, after which transgression and regression of sea shaped the western coast of the district.

The district has hilly terrain and forests in the north and west, and is predominantly agricultural in the southeast and central regions. Along the southern border lies an extensive seashore interspersed with valleys and plains. The coastal uplands of the district are characterised by rocky outcrops and rugged coastlines, with notable Teri sand dune complexes. The coastlines of Kanyakumari, Theerthakkarai, Muttom, and Kadiyapattanam are especially rocky. In Muttom, a Teri dune complex extends along the coast; sand dunes also stretch from Manakudi to Sothavilai. The southern coastline consists of sandy beaches and isolated boulders.

The district occupies the southernmost extremity of the Indian Shield, a continental landmass underlain by ancient Precambrian crust. Geotectonically, Kanyakumari district lies within the Southern Granulite Terrain—in the southern sector of the Kerala Khondalite Belt—and encompasses the Nagercoil charnockite massif. The underlying Trivandrum Block basement is geochemically characterised by ferroan-rich, strongly peraluminous lithologies ranging from low-K tholeiitic to shoshonitic series. Structurally, the region is defined by sub-horizontal to gently inclined mineralogical segregation layering S_{2T} that forms regional-scale, WNW-trending open asymmetric folds. Its northern boundary is demarcated by the Achankovil Shear Zone system, an anastomosing network of WNW-striking, steep-dipping sinistral and dextral shears.

Vital to East Gondwana reconstructions, the district's southernmost bedrock—the Nagercoil Unit—records ultra-high-temperature metamorphism during the Pan-African orogeny (~550 Ma), establishing direct lithotectonic continuity with the Androyan and Anosyan domains of Southern Madagascar via the Ranotsara Shear Zone, alongside structural links to the Central Highlands of Sri Lanka and East Antarctica's Lützow-Holm Complex. High-precision monazite chemical and zircon dating further reveal an ancient Paleoproterozoic (2.1–1.8 Ga) crustal foundation underlying this Pan-African overprint. Fractures, joints, and shear zones developed within these crystalline rocks during successive tectonic events and continue to influence groundwater occurrence, drainage characteristics, weathering processes, and landscape development across the region.

Peninsular India is typically described as a stable shield region bounded by continental margins that have been affected by tectonic movements and faulting. During the Archaean Eon, the eastern coast experienced faulting, whereas the faulting of the western coast, including major parts of the district, occurred later, approximately 25 million years ago during the early Miocene epoch. Subsequent marine transgressions and regressions of the sea led to the formation of various sedimentary layers. Over time, sea level fluctuations and land-sea interactions contributed to the development of diverse coastal landforms, including beaches, beach terraces, dunes, rocky shores and estuaries. The sea eventually receded, resulting in uplifted landmasses. Evidence of this uplift includes deeply entrenched streams, waterfalls, high hanging valleys, alluvial flats and marine sediment patches at higher elevations. Notably, shelly limestone formations occur near Kanyakumari. These deposits have been interpreted by some authors as evidence of former marine conditions in the area. The uplift likely occurred in stages, rejuvenating older streams. The wind gap at Mekkode resulted from river piracy, where the Paraliyar was captured by the Kodayar, possibly during the Tertiary period. The straight west coastline suggests faulting active into the Pliocene epoch. Similarly, changes in the Kodayar River's course, from northward to northeast to southwest, indicate faulting along its path.

Geologically, the region features two main rock groups: the Khondalites and Charnockites, with Migmatites also occurring in some areas. The Khondalites, composed of garnetiferous Sillimanite-Graphite Gneisses and Garnet-Biotite gneisses, dominate a significant portion of the district. The Charnockites are exposed in areas between Padmanabhapuram, Aralvaimozhi, Kulasekaram, Thuckalay, and Rajakkamangalam. The distinctive occurrence of feldspathic granites across a significant portion of this region indicates that the rocks underwent intense isoclinal folding, resulting in repeated bands. These folds align in a northwest–southeast direction and may have subsequently experienced cross-folding. These charnockites also occur as lenses and patches within the khondalites. Additionally, thin Pegmatite bodies and quartz veins intrude the khondalites. Tertiary-age Varkala beds appear as thin cappings south of Kaliyakkavilai near the coast.

The basement rocks are covered by a sequence of soil types, including red soil, lateritic soil, clay, river alluvium, coastal alluvium, and black and red sandy soils. These soil layers have thicknesses ranging from 1 metre to 1.5 metres in most locations. The underlying crystalline terrain belongs to the high-grade granulite basement. The coastal belt around Kanyakumari, Kovalam, and Vattakottai contains recent-age formations, including Calcareous sandstones, limeshells, and Kankary Limestone. Heavy mineral placer deposits, including sand, zircon, rutile, ilmenite, and garnet, are commonly found along the entire sea coast of Kanyakumari.

== Climate ==
Kanyakumari district has a tropical climate, characterised by warm temperatures throughout the year. The district generally has high temperatures year-round, with average highs ranging from 29 to 33 °C (84 to 91 °F) and average lows from 23 to 26 °C (73 to 79 °F). The summer from March to May is typically hot, with temperatures often exceeding 34 °C (93 °F). The heat is more intense due to weaker winds. The region's proximity to the equator makes it hard to distinctly define the summer season and summers are significantly wetter than winters. Winters from January to February are mild and pleasant, with temperatures rarely dropping below 19 °C (66 °F). The district lies at the intersection of two distinct climate zones. To the northwest, the Malabar coast, west of the Western Ghats, experiences heavy rainfall during the summer monsoon from June to September. The southeastern coast, starting from Kanyakumari, has a semi-arid climate due to the limited impact of the summer monsoon. However, the retreating monsoon from October to December brings more rain, though its effects are somewhat reduced by the proximity of Sri Lanka.

The Indian Ocean Geoid Low, Earth's largest gravity anomaly, located south of Kanyakumari, influences the region's climate by altering sea levels, ocean currents, and monsoon dynamics. Its deep mantle origins are linked to tectonic shifts that subtly affect oceanic heat distribution and atmospheric circulation.

Climate data for Kanyakumari (1991–2021, Rainy days:1999-2019)
Month	Jan	Feb	Mar	Apr	May	Jun	Jul	Aug	Sep	Oct	Nov	Dec	Year
Mean daily maximum °C (°F)	29.4 (84.9)	30.5 (86.9)	31.5 (88.7)	31.5 (88.7)	30.7 (87.3)	29.1 (84.4)	29.0 (84.2)	29.3 (84.7)	29.5 (85.1)	29.0 (84.2)	28.4 (83.1)	28.5 (83.3)	29.7 (85.5)
Daily mean °C (°F)	26.0 (78.8)	26.8 (80.2)	28.0 (82.4)	28.5 (83.3)	28.1 (82.6)	26.9 (80.4)	26.5 (79.7)	26.6 (79.9)	26.7 (80.1)	26.5 (79.7)	26.1 (79.0)	25.9 (78.6)	26.9 (80.4)
Mean daily minimum °C (°F)	23.1 (73.6)	23.6 (74.5)	24.9 (76.8)	26.1 (79.0)	26.2 (79.2)	25.3 (77.5)	24.8 (76.6)	24.7 (76.5)	24.8 (76.6)	24.7 (76.5)	24.2 (75.6)	23.6 (74.5)	24.7 (76.4)
Average rainfall mm (inches)	15.0 (0.59)	12.0 (0.47)	27.0 (1.06)	56.0 (2.20)	81.0 (3.19)	83.0 (3.27)	42.0 (1.65)	37.0 (1.46)	49.0 (1.93)	137.0 (5.39)	183.0 (7.20)	71.0 (2.80)	793 (31.21)
Average rainy days	2	2	3	7	9	11	7	6	7	12	13	6	85
Average relative humidity (%) (at 17:30 IST)	69	68	71	76	78	81	80	79	79	80	80	73	76
Mean daily sunshine hours	9.9	10.1	10.2	10.0	9.6	9.7	10.1	10.1	9.8	9.4	8.9	9.4	9.8

Unlike other districts in Tamil Nadu, it receives rainfall from both the southwest and northeast monsoon. The region receives moderate rainfall, with the heaviest rains occurring from October to December due to the northeast monsoon which sometimes causes floods. The southwest monsoon, from June to September, also brings rain, but its effects are less pronounced compared to other parts of India. The average rainfall of the district is 1456.8 mm per annum. From 2005 onwards the annual rainfall is estimated to be 1006 mm. The driest month is February and the greatest amount of precipitation occurs in November. Humidity levels are relatively high, especially during the monsoon seasons, contributing to a humid and warm atmosphere. June has the highest relative humidity, while February has the lowest. November experiences the most rainy days and January has the fewest.

The climate supports the region's rich biodiversity and lush landscapes.

== Biodiversity ==
As part of the Western Ghats, one of the world's eight hottest biodiversity hotspots, this district has diverse flora and fauna, many of which are endemic to the region. It is home to several endangered and threatened species, including the Indian bison, Indian rock python, lion-tailed macaque, and Nilgiri tahr. The Kanyakumari Wildlife Sanctuary, a protected area covering 457.78 km^{2}, is situated in the northern and northwestern parts of the district. It constitutes the southern section of the Agastyamalai region, bordered by Kerala's Neyyar Wildlife Sanctuary to the west and Kalakkad Mundanthurai Tiger Reserve to the east. Seven rivers including the Pahrali and Thamirabarani have their origin in this forest. The forests and jungles of Kanyakumari district host approximately 600 species of trees and 3,500 other plant species. The wetlands of Suchindrum and Arumanallur support numerous floral and faunal species across hundreds of genera. New species are frequently identified throughout the region.

=== Forests ===
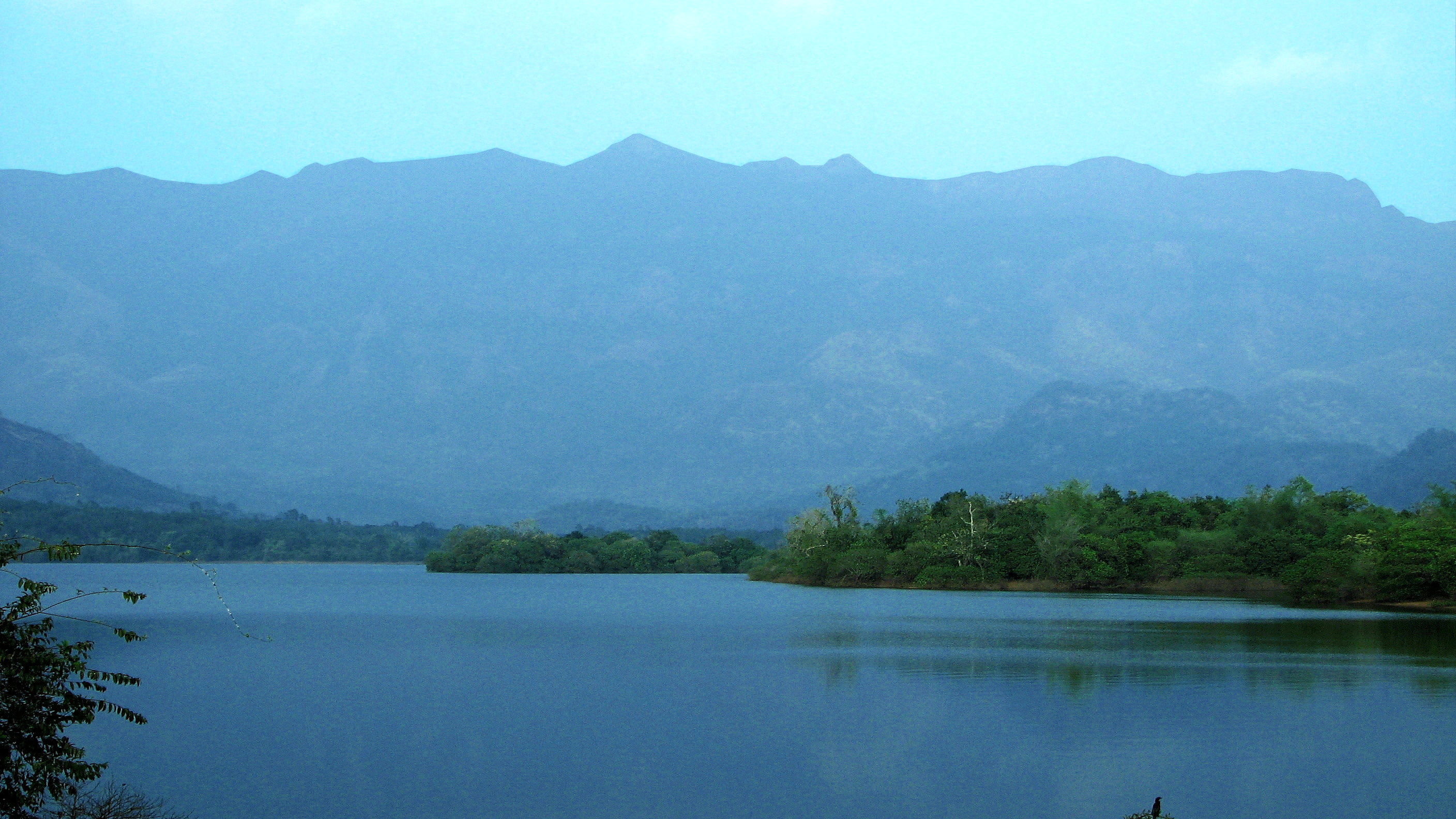
The Western Ghats at Pechiparai, Kanyakumari District

Out of the total land area of 168,356.216 hectares, approximately 48,423 hectares are covered by forests. Reserved forests account for 44,799 hectares, while 3,605 hectares are unclassed forests. Additionally, there are 19 hectares of reserved lands. Most forests in the district are situated on slopes of hills and plateaus, benefiting from high rainfall and serving as catchment basins for numerous streams and rivers. The district contains lush old-growth forests. The forest of this region comes under Boothapandy Mahendra-giri Reserve forest and is managed by the District Forest Officer with Headquarters at Nagercoil.

The jungles host around 600 species of gigantic timber trees and 3,500 other plants, many of which hold significant economic value. Notable timber trees include teak, rosewood (blackwood), Jungle Jack, Malabar ebony, Adina cordifolia, Karumaruthu, and Vengai. Softwood varieties like Bombax ceiba and glossy-leaved jack are also abundant, along with reeds, bamboos, and sandalwood. Plantations of cardamom and tea thrive at higher elevations, while pepper, rubber, ginger, and turmeric flourish in lower areas. Due to various local geological factors, the forests in the Kanyakumari division encompass 14 distinct types, based on the Champion and Seth's classification ranging from lush tropical wet evergreen forests to tropical thorn forests, all within a relatively small area. The region hosts a diverse array of plant species, with its natural vegetation encompassing southern thorn forests, dry deciduous forests, moist deciduous forests, semi-evergreen forests, and evergreen hill sholas interspersed with grassy downs.

Dry deciduous forests range from an altitude of 200 to 600 meters in regions like Keeriparai, Mangolamottai (lower Kodayar), Maruthaparai (Kulasekaram), Ulakkaruvi, and Kuttiyar. Tree and shrub species include Adina cordifolia, Cochlospermum religiosum, Dillenia pentagyna Hydnocarpus laurifolius, Lannea coromandelica and Terminalia chebula. Desmodium triangulare of the Legume family, the root parasites Aeginetia indica and pedunculata have also been recorded in the region.

Moist deciduous forests occur around Kilaviaru mountains and Kalikesam river near Balamore and Vallachithode at an altitude of about 60 metres. Common trees include Acronychia pedunculata, Alstonia scholaris, Scleropyrum wallichianum, and Vateria indica. Lianas, Gnetum and Derris thyrsiflora thrive in these areas. Lithophytic herbs like Begonia floccifera and Begonia malabarica are abundant around Kilaviyaru.

Tropical wet evergreen forests are found in Upper Kodayar, Muthukuzhivayal, and Mahendragiri above 800 metres. These dense forests receive heavy monsoon rains, supporting abundant epiphytic and terrestrial orchids. Trees in these forests include Aglaia bourdillonii, Cullenia exarillata and Dimocarpus longan. Climbers like Embelia basaal and Smilax zeylanica are common along with epiphytes Aeschynanthus perrottetii and Hoya pauciflora.

Grasslands can be found in elevated areas in Muthukuzhivayal, Mahendragiri, and Upper Kodayar. Within the forested areas, each river basin—Kodayar and Pahrali—encompasses approximately 30 square miles of grasslands. Common grass species in this region include Chrysopogon orientalis, Eulalia phaeothrix, Themeda trimula, and Zenkeria sebastinei. Other herbaceous plants such as Acrotrema arnottianum, Centratherum rangacharii, Exacum travancoricum, Leucas vestita, Linum mysorense, Hedyotis purpurascens, Heracleum candeolleanum and Senecio ludens can also be found. On dripping rocks, Utricularia purpurea and Utricularia reticulata are commonly observed.

=== Flora ===
The hills of the region harbour a unique xerophytic flora, adapted to arid conditions. At higher elevations, large grasses like Andropogon, Panicum, lemon grass, and fodder grass thrive. Closer to the base, shrubby forms—such as species of Phoenix, Cycas, and Inthai—find their niche. Abundant bamboo clumps (including Ochlandra) and dense cane growths (both bamboo family members) abound. Sheltered beneath the grasses, ephemeral annual herbs and herbaceous perennials emerge during favourable seasons. In the sheltered valleys, extensive paddy cultivation sustains the region. Paddy remains the staple food crop. Tapioca, the second most important food crop, thrives primarily in Kalkulam and Vilavancode taluks. Palmyrah and coconut groves dot the plains and coastal regions.

The landscape is adorned with significant avenue trees, including the Banyan, jungle jack, Eugenia, Portia tree and Tamarind. Common edible fruits, such as mangoes, jackfruit, custard apple, various plantain varieties, pineapple and guava, contribute to local livelihoods. Oranges, lime, and pomegranate also flourish. Grape cultivation occurs in specific pockets. 329 plant species have been identified across 201 sacred groves in the district. These species belong to 251 genera within 110 families. Among them, 12 are categorised as rare, endemic, and threatened. One of every seven species in the groves of the region are rare. Alpinia galanga, Gloriosa superba, Nymphaea pubescens, Hemidesmus indicus, Kaempferia galanga, and Rauvolfia serpentina are endangered while Justicia beddomei, Leea indica, and Petiveria alliacea are considered rare. Species such as Indigofera uniflora, Naregamia alata, Ochlandra scriptoria and Osbeckia aspera are endemic to the sacred groves of the district.

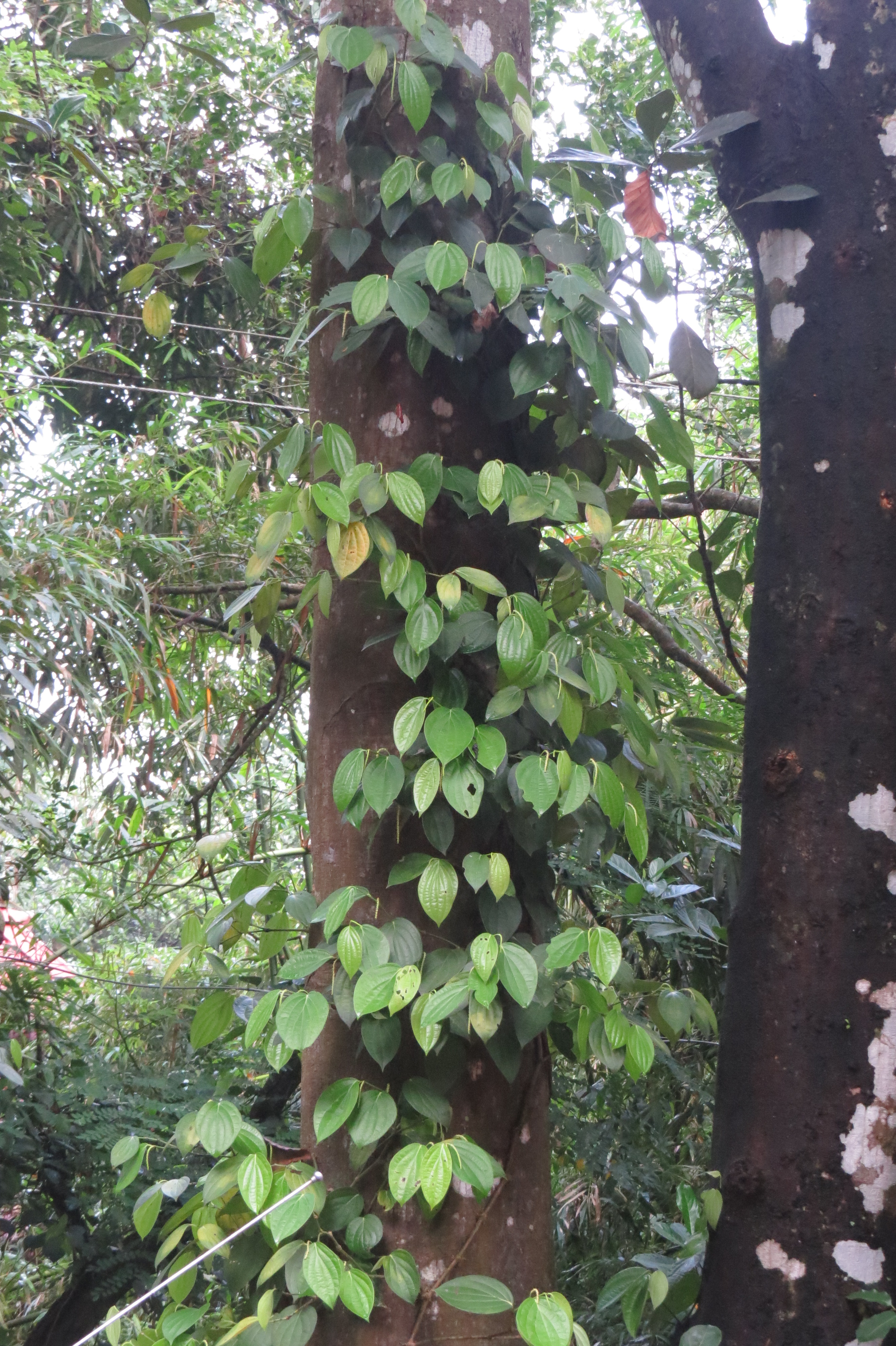
Black pepper on Jackfruit tree.

Around 60 species of medicinal plants thrive in the district. These include the medicinal weeds such as Abrus precatorius, Abutilon indicum, Acalypha indica, Achyranthes aspera, Acorus calamus, Aloe vera and Alternanthera sessilis. Those found around the sacred groves include Atalantia monophylla, Atalantia racemosa, Mesua ferrea, Commelina benghalensis and Sterculia urens. Showy or scented flowers—such as Kolunthu, Chempakam, henna, Ceylon Jasmine Nanthiarvattam and Asokam—adorn gardens and natural spaces of the eastern areas. Several rose varieties flourish in well-tended gardens. Of the Spices, the Kanyakumari clove which accounts for 65% of India's clove production is produced around Maramalai, Karumparai and Velimalai areas above Veerapuli Reserve and Mahendragiri hills of the district. Cardamom, black pepper, ginger, turmeric and other spices thrive here. Tuberous plants like sweet potato, arrow-root, and tapioca yield edible roots. The hedges in the region consist of a variety of thorny or succulent shrubs. Among them are the screw-pine, prickly-pear, pineapple, Agave, and Euphorbia. Additional hedge plants include Jatropha, Pithecolobium, Casuarina, Sesbania, Erythrina, Pongu, and Lantana. Climbers, most of which have leafy growth, overgrow these hedges. Other than the xerophytic vegetation, the district also hosts hydrophytic flora. In the ponds, large groups of lotus and water lilies thrive, along with smaller Limnanthemum plants. Floating plants like Trapa bispinosa and Pistia statistis cover water surfaces, often beneath the shade of big banyan trees. Submerged plants, including Ceratophyllum, Utricularia, and Chara, form a close tangle underwater. In shallow tanks and river basins, reeds flourish in marshy soil. The reeds consist of juncus, scirpus, cyperus and typha, forming a dense palisade of leaves over the water surface. Numerous marshy plants thrive between the reeds and along the margins.

The plains, up to an elevation of 200 meters, are characterised by Southern tropical thorny forests. Notable locations within this ecosystem include Anjugramam, Vattakkottai, Kanyakumari, Marunthuvazh Malai, Colachel, and Kuzhithurai. These forests support a variety of plant life. Common trees found in the interior plains include Cassia siamea, Dichrostachys cinerea, Morinda pubescens, Thespesia populnea, Ficus bengalensis, Mangifera indica, Alstonia scholaris, Pongamia pinnata, and Calophyllum inophyllum. Shrubs and under shrubs like Crotalaria gigantea, Cassia auriculata, Vitex negundo, Crotalaria striata, and Dodonaea viscosa are abundant. Beneath the shade of these shrubs and trees, herbaceous plants such as Rhinacanthus nasutus, Asystasia gangetica and Vernonia cinerea thrive. Climbers like Pterolobium hexapetalum, Lantana camara, Cissus quadrangularis, Aganosma cymosa, Coccinia grandis, Pergularia daemia and Jasminum angustifolium are also frequently encountered in this ecosystem.

The coastal areas face unique challenges due to factors like sandy soil, aridity, scanty rainfall, and strong winds. In the Foreshore sandy areas, species like Spinifex littoreus, Ipomoea pes-caprae (Sweet), Sesuvium portulacastrum, Trianthema portulacastrum, Atriplex repens, Cyperus rotundus, Mollugo cerviana, Tephrosia purpurea, T. hirta, Pedalium murex and various Portulaca species shall be found. In marshy backwater areas, Suaeda nudiflora, Salicornia brachiata, and Arthrocnemum indicum are frequently found. Backwaters near river mouths and connecting canals are often thickly fringed with Pandanus tectorius. Acrostichum aureum and Excoecaria agallocha are common in shallow waters. In the Manakudy, Thengapattanam Munchirai backwater area, Barringtonia racemosa, Ixora coccinea, and Nauclea missionis thrive. Closer to the shore, Neptunia and Hygrophila grow intermingled with Aeschynomene aspera, Ludwigia, and Ipomoea reptans. More than 100 species, spanning across 90 genera and 46 families including Adenanthera pavonina, Ficus religiosa, Psidium guajava, Ocimum tenuiflorum, Waltheria indica, Dendrobium macrostachyum and Sida acuta were recorded in the sacred groves along the south-west coast of the district. The vegetation in the cape area is typically xerophytic. Acacia planifrons groves characterise this region. Within the Acacia woods, cacti, agave, and aloe grow, accompanied by a ground cover of typical xerophytic herbs, including various grasses. Moving to the inland sandy areas, these regions are characterised by xerophytic plants such as Euphorbia tirucalli, Jatropha curcas, Jatropha gossypiifolia, Cleome aspera, Chorispora tenella, Aerva lanata, Phyla nodiflora, and Zornia diphylla.

=== Fauna ===
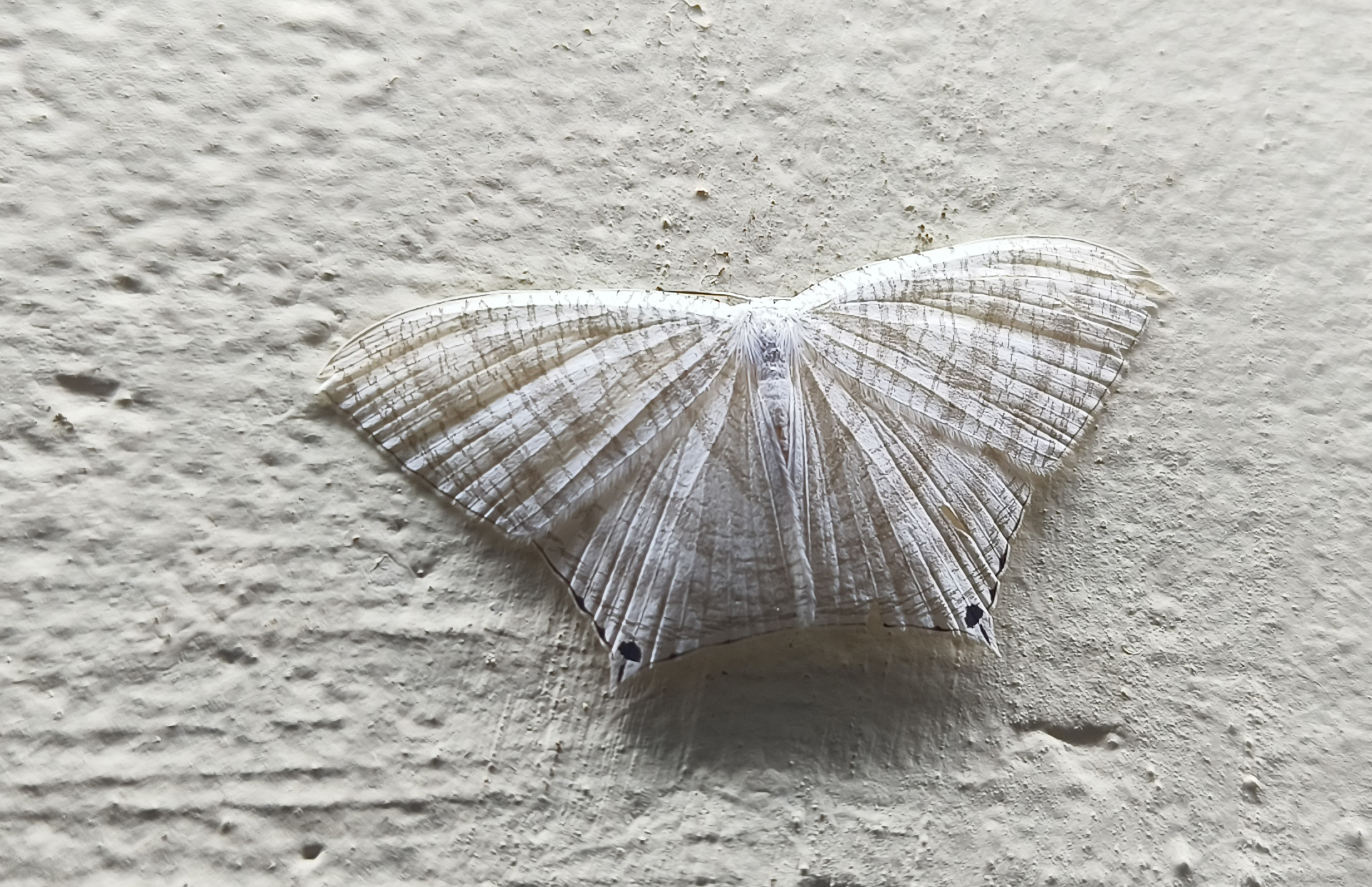
Micronia aculeata, spotted at Attoor.

The district has an abundance of wildlife, and its hill forests contain most species of Southern India. The district's fauna belongs to the Cis gangetic sub-region of the Indomalayan realm, with its hill fauna showing affinities with the Himalayas and the southwestern hill group in Sri Lanka. The district hosts ten orders of mammals. Four species of primates are found in the sholas and moist deciduous forests, including the bonnet macaque and toque macaque at lower altitudes, and the lion-tailed macaque and Nilgiri langur at elevations above 2,000 feet. The slender loris of the order Lemuroidea occurs in the interior forests. Situated at the tail-end of the Central Asian Flyway, the region attracts numerous migratory birds from thousands of miles away.

Tigers are found around the Black Rock estate and descend to lower elevations during October and November, occasionally entering bordering villages. Panthers inhabit moist deciduous forests and often prey on domesticated animals. Bears usually reside at elevations above 3,000 feet but sometimes descend to lower levels. Wild dogs are found in the lower hills of the Muthukuzhi valley, while the Indian grey mongoose and jungle cat are common in the low country and jungles. Jackals and foxes are also common. The South Indian hedgehog is found throughout the district. Bats are very common, with four different species present. Among squirrels, the palm squirrel is most common in the countryside, while the Malabar squirrel inhabits the jungles. The Indian porcupine is found throughout the forests. Rats, mice, and hares are very common, and black rat and Mus booduga are found across the district.

Elephants are abundant in the upper reaches of Asambu and Veerapuli reserves and are occasionally spotted around Kodayar, Perunchani and Balamore areas. Deer are seen throughout the hilly forests, with three species present: The spotted deer, sambur, and the barking deer. The Muthukuzhi valley and the entire Asambu region are favoured by Sambur deer. The gaur is the largest of the two bovines found in the forests, living in rock caves on hills up to an elevation of 5,000 feet. Small herds of bison frequent the sholas and grassy areas around the Muthukuzhi valley and the higher reaches of Asambu. The wild goat is usually confined to grassy slopes. Wild bears are found on the hills and jungles in herds. Additionally, aquatic dolphins and porpoises are found in river mouths and backwaters. Indian pangolins are also present in forests and surrounding valleys.

The district's forests support a rich variety of avifauna, with about 360 species recorded. Notably, 140 out of the 204 species of South Indian passerine birds are found here. The house crow is the most common bird, while the jungle crow is less frequently seen. Common babblers include the earthy-brown jungle babbler and the slimmer common babbler found in dry plains. Magpie-robins are usually seen near human habitations. Other common birds include the cuckoo, golden oriole and Indian robin which are frequently noted in dry areas. The tailorbird and the drongo or king crow often visit the countryside. The red-vented bulbul is seen in plains where food is plentiful and at elevations of about 4,000 feet. The iora is found in gardens and groves. Among shrikes, the scarlet minivet is the most common, found in woody areas and evergreen jungles. The common myna is found on grasslands, while the common weaver bird or baya weaver is seen in coconut groves of valleys and plains. The skylark is often heard in low country and on hills.

Three species of sunbirds — Cinnyris zeylanicus, Cinnyris asiaticus, and Loten's sunbird — are frequently found in gardens. Common woodpeckers include the golden-backed woodpecker, the Yellow-fronted Pied Woodpecker, and the Southern Rufous woodpecker. The Malabar whistling thrush, a blue-black bird, is found near hilly streams. Paradise flycatchers often visit shady groves, gardens, and deciduous jungles with bamboo-clad regions. 87 bird species from 39 families and 15 orders, including omnivores, carnivores, piscivores, herbivores, granivores, and nectarivores, such as the Eurasian spoonbill, brahminy starling, glossy ibis, Oriental white ibis and spot-billed pelican have been observed around the Swamithoppe saltpans.

The house sparrow is commonly found around human habitations. Parrots are mostly seen in hilly and woody areas while kingfishers such as the white-throated kingfisher, common kingfisher and pied kingfisher are found beside inundated paddy fields, ponds, kutcha wells and sandy seashores. Bee-eaters are very common. The Indian blue rock pigeons are seen all over the plains. Among game birds, the junglefowl is common around the Asambu forests in the Azhagiapandiapuram range. Francolinus is often seen in thorny scrubby areas. Two main varieties of owls are the spotted owlet and the barn owl, which occasionally stray into the countryside and perch on house tops. Other varieties include the brown fish owl and the Indian great horned owl. Two important species of kites in this district are the pariah kite and the brahminy kite.

Among the birds of prey, the white-rumped vulture and the white scavenger vulture are prominent. Water birds are common along coastal backwaters, inundated paddy fields, and tanks. The white-breasted waterhen is often seen in marshy areas overgrown with reeds and bushes, and on the margins of ponds. Storks and coots are frequently found in inundated paddy fields, tanks, ponds, and rivers. Comb ducks are observed at Suchindram and Theroor wetlands while four other species of ducks are common in the area. The Indian pond heron is abundant in paddy fields and ponds. Flamingos, including the greater flamingo, can be seen across the Rajakkamangalam and Manakudi estuary throughout the year.

The region's reptiles include crocodiles, tortoises, turtles, lizards, and snakes. There are two species of crocodile, nine species of chelonian, 33 species of lizard, and 74 species of snake. The king cobra frequents rivers and streams in shola forests. The viper and the Indian cobra are common, often found in tree hollows and dilapidated houses. Rat snakes are frequently seen and pythons are found in dry sandy areas. Among amphibians, 34 species of frogs are present, including Rana aurantiaca, Ixalus travancoricus, and Ferguson's toad. The Indian Leaping frog is found around Kiripparai areas.

The coastal area is known for its rich variety of fish, with nearly 370 species identified. Whale sharks and saw fish are abundant in the seas, along with flatfish, prawn, shrimp, and crabs. Rock oysters form dense colonies at Kovalam, and a small octopus species is found under rocks at Cape Comorin. The sacred chank is found in large quantities here. At Cape Comorin, two species of top shells, Trochus radiatus and Trochus costatus, are abundant. Various poisonous insects, including scorpions and spiders, are found in the district. Ticks of the genus Ixodes are commonly found in grasslands. Arthropods in the region include Ranatra, Cybister, earwigs, Prodasineura, Hydrometra, cockroaches, leaf insects, grasshoppers, and crickets.

== Governance ==
Kanyakumari district was officially formed on 1 November 1956, as a result of the States Reorganisation Act, 1956, which aimed to reorganise state boundaries based on linguistic lines. The District Collector is the chief administrative officer, responsible for overall administration, including law and order, revenue collection, and implementation of government schemes. The Superintendent of Police oversees the police force and maintains law and order in the district. The District Revenue Officer (DRO) assists the District Collector in revenue administration and land-related issues.

The district is divided into two revenue divisions: Nagercoil division and Padmanabhapuram division. These divisions are further subdivided into taluks, which are the basic administrative units. Each taluk is managed by a tahsildar, who handles revenue collection, land records, and local administration.

There are nine blocks within these taluks: Agastheeswaram, Rajakkamangalam, Thovalai, Kurunthancode, Thuckalay, Thiruvattar, Killiyoor, Munchirai, and Melpuram. Each block is managed by a Block Development Officer.

There is a municipal corporation in the district, the Nagercoil Municipal Corporation, five municipalities (Kanyakumari, kuzhithurai, kollencode, padmanathapuram,Colachel) and 50 Town Panchayats, which are responsible for urban infrastructure, sanitation, and public services. Rural areas are governed by Panchayats, which are local self-government bodies responsible for village-level administration and development.

The district includes the Kanniyakumari Lok Sabha constituency, which is represented in the Lok Sabha by a Member of Parliament. This constituency is divided into six assembly constituencies, each represented by a Member of the Legislative Assembly in the Tamil Nadu Legislative Assembly. The legislative assembly segments include Kanyakumari, Nagercoil, Colachal, Padmanabhapuram, Vilavancode, and Killiyoor.

The judiciary in the district operates under the framework of the Indian judicial system, ensuring justice and legal order in the region. The District Court in Kanyakumari is the principal court of original jurisdiction in civil and criminal matters. It handles cases that require significant judicial intervention and has the authority to hear appeals from lower courts. The court is managed by a District Judge, who is responsible for the administration of justice within the district. Other subordinate courts include those in Padmanabhapuram and Kuzhithurai.

== Demographics ==
Historical population
Year	Pop.	±% p.a.
1901	359,248	—
1911	422,260	+1.63%
1921	494,125	+1.58%
1931	581,851	+1.65%
1941	676,975	+1.53%
1951	826,380	+2.01%
1961	996,915	+1.89%
1971	1,222,549	+2.06%
1981	1,423,399	+1.53%
1991	1,600,349	+1.18%
2001	1,676,034	+0.46%
2011	1,870,374	+1.10%

According to the 2011 Census, the district had a population of 1,870,374, consisting of 926,345 males and 944,029 females. This was an 11.60% increase from the 2001 Census, which recorded a population of 1,676,034. The district's population accounted for 2.59% of Tamil Nadu's total population in 2011, a slight decrease from 2.69% in 2001. The population density rose from 995 people per square kilometre in 2001 to 1,111 in 2011. Scheduled Castes constituted 4% and Scheduled Tribes 0.4% of the district's population. Tamil is the most widely spoken language in Kanyakumari district, though there is a significant minority (5.76%) of Malayalam speakers living mainly along the Kerala border.

Religion in Kanyakumari district (2011)
Religion	Percent
Hinduism	48.65%
Christianity	46.85%
Islam	4.20%
Other or not stated	0.30%

Block	Hindu	Christian	Other
Thovala	74,733	38,344	7,849
Agastheeswaram	347,807	176,206	28,162
Vilavancode	100,239	345,203	17,225
Kalkulam	259,193	316,546	30,967

As of the 2011 Census, Kanyakumari's population was 1,870,374, with Hindus (48.65%), Christians (46.85%) and Muslims (4.20%) being the major religious groups. The district's western taluks are predominantly Christian, while the eastern taluks are mainly Hindu. The literacy rate in the district remained high, averaging 91.75% in 2011, unchanged from 2001. Male literacy was 93.65%, while female literacy was 89.90%, showing an improvement from 90.37% and 84.79%, respectively, in 2001. The total number of literate people in the district was 1,548,738, with 780,541 males and 768,197 females, a significant increase from 1,308,322 in 2001.

The child population of 182,350, aged 0–6, made up 9.75% of the district's total population, down from 10.84% in 2001. The child sex ratio was 964 girls per 1,000 boys, a minor decrease from 968 in 2001.

The district had a total of 483,539 households. There were 679,620 workers, consisting of 12,229 cultivators, 51,350 main agricultural labourers, 21,078 in household industries, 468,001 other workers, 126,962 marginal workers, 3,381 marginal cultivators, 21,517 marginal agricultural labourers, 14,711 marginal workers in household industries, and 87,353 other marginal workers. The sex ratio in the district improved slightly, standing at 1,019 females per 1,000 males in 2011, compared to 1,014 in 2001. The national average sex ratio in India was 940, indicating that Kanyakumari had a relatively balanced gender ratio. 82.33% of Kanyakumari's population lived in urban areas, totalling 1,539,802 people. The literacy rate in urban areas was 91.96%, with male literacy at 93.92% and female literacy at 90.06%. The literacy rate in rural areas was 90.76%, with male literacy at 92.39% and female literacy at 89.16%.

== Politics ==
=== Kanyakumari Lok Sabha Constituency ===
Constituency number	Constituency name	Reserved for	Elected member	Political party	Alliance
39	Kanyakumari	General	Vijay Vasanth	Indian National Congress	INDIA

=== Members of Legislative Assembly from Kanyakumari district ===
District	No.	Constituency	Name	Party	Alliance	Remarks
Kanyakumari	229	Kanniyakumari	N. Thalavai Sundaram	AIADMK	NDA	Opposed TVK
Kanyakumari	230	Nagercoil	S. Austin	DMK	SPA	
Kanyakumari	231	Colachal	Tharahai Cuthbert	INC	TVK+	Won as SPA candidate; party switched to TVK+ post-election
Kanyakumari	232	Padmanabhapuram	R. Chellaswamy	CPI(M)	LDF	Won as SPA candidate; party switched to TVK+ post-election; outside support to TVK government
Kanyakumari	233	Vilavancode	T. T. Praveen	INC	TVK+	Won as SPA candidate; party switched to TVK+ post-election
Kanyakumari	234	Killiyoor	S. Rajeshkumar	INC	TVK+	Won as SPA candidate; party switched to TVK+ post-election; Cabinet Minister

== Places of interest ==
=== Thiruvalluvar Statue ===
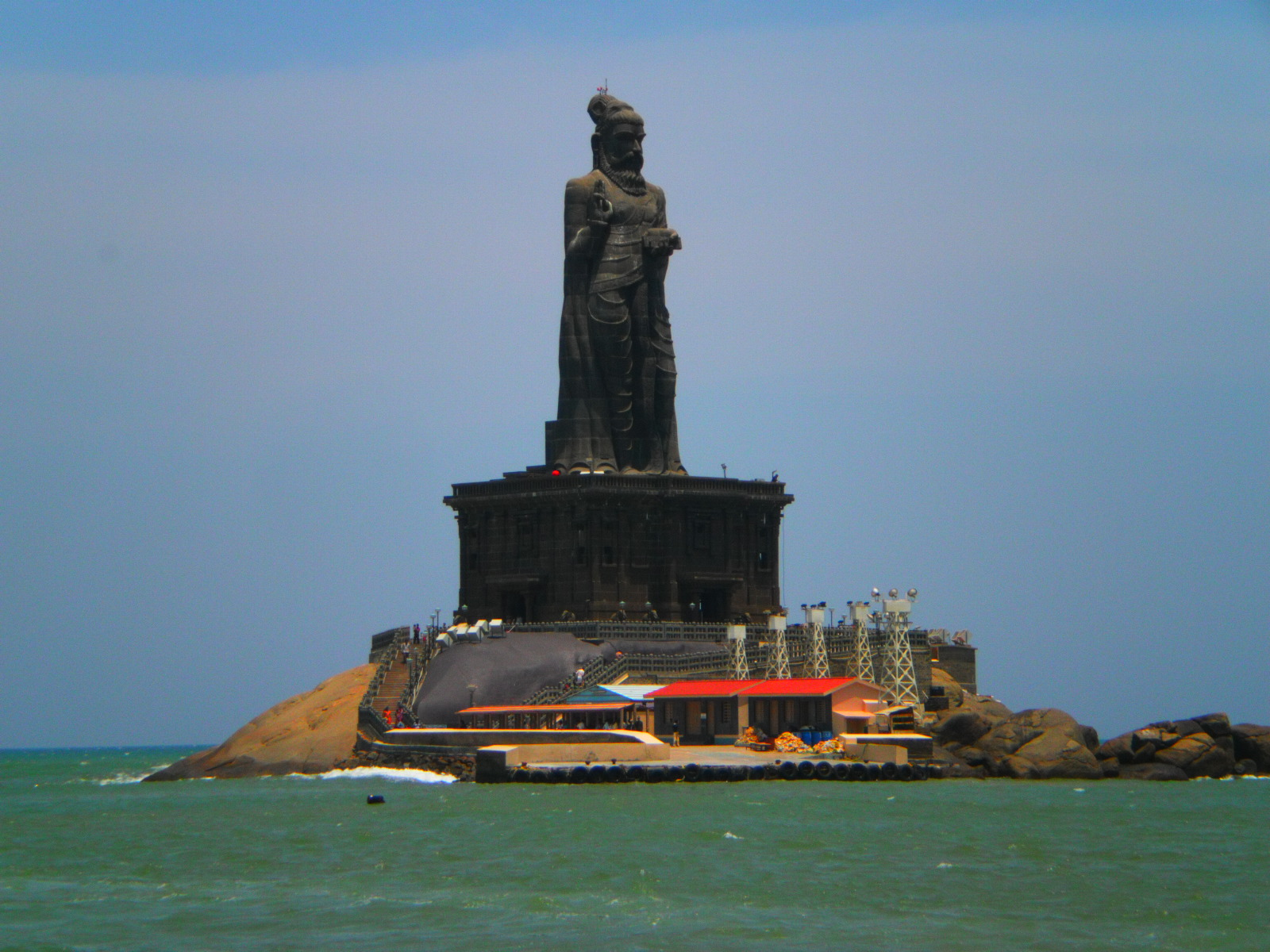
Statue of Valluvar at Kanyakumari

The Thiruvalluvar Statue, or Valluvar Statue, is a 41-metre-tall (133 ft) stone sculpture of the Tamil poet and philosopher Valluvar, author of the Tirukkural, an ancient Tamil work on Dharma and morality. It is located atop a small island near the town of Kanniyakumari on the southernmost point of the Indian peninsula on the Coromandel Coast, where the Bay of Bengal and the Arabian Sea meet the Indian Ocean. The statue was created by the Indian sculptor V. Ganapati Sthapati, who also created the Iraivan Temple, and was unveiled on 1 January 2000 by the then Chief Minister M. Karunanidhi. It is the 25th tallest statue in India.

=== Manimedai ===
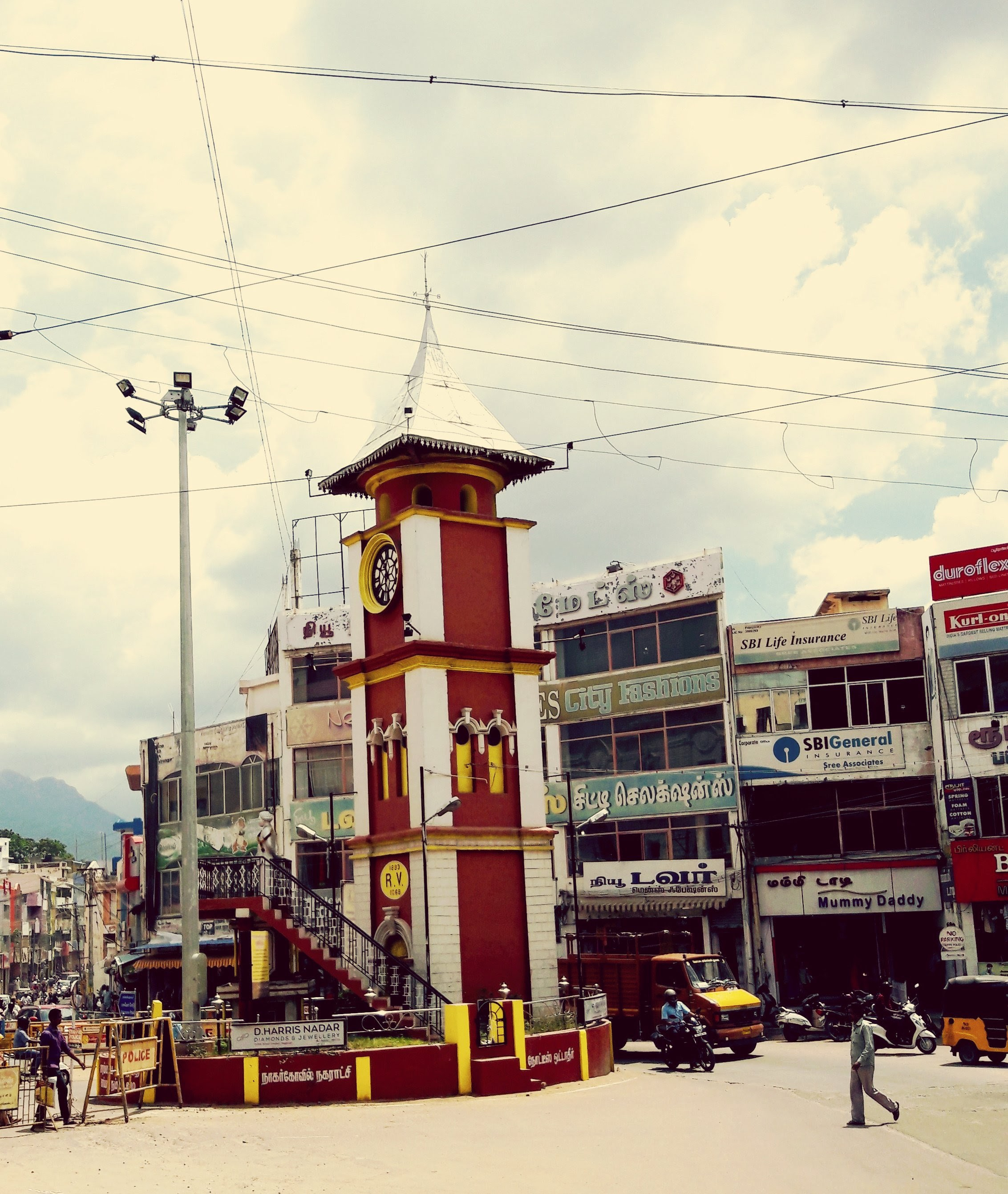
Manimedai

Manimedai (lit. 'High Clock') is situated in the central part of Nagercoil. The construction of the Clock gauge began in 1892 in the period of Travancore Maharajas. After construction, it was opened by His Highness Sree Moolam Thirunal Varma, the King of Travancore. The clock placed in the gauge was gifted to the English missionary in Nagercoil.

=== Mathur Aqueduct ===
Mathur Aqueduct was built in Paraliyaru River to pass water between two mountains, Aruvikkarai and Mudhalaaru. The aqueduct was built by Former Chief Minister of Tamil Nadu Perunthalaivar Thiru Kamarajar and was South Asia's largest aqueduct. It is 1,240 ft (380 m) long and 101 ft (31 m) high. It is 3 km (1.9 mi) from Thiruvattar and 26 km (16 mi) from Nagercoil.

=== Padmanabhapuram palace ===
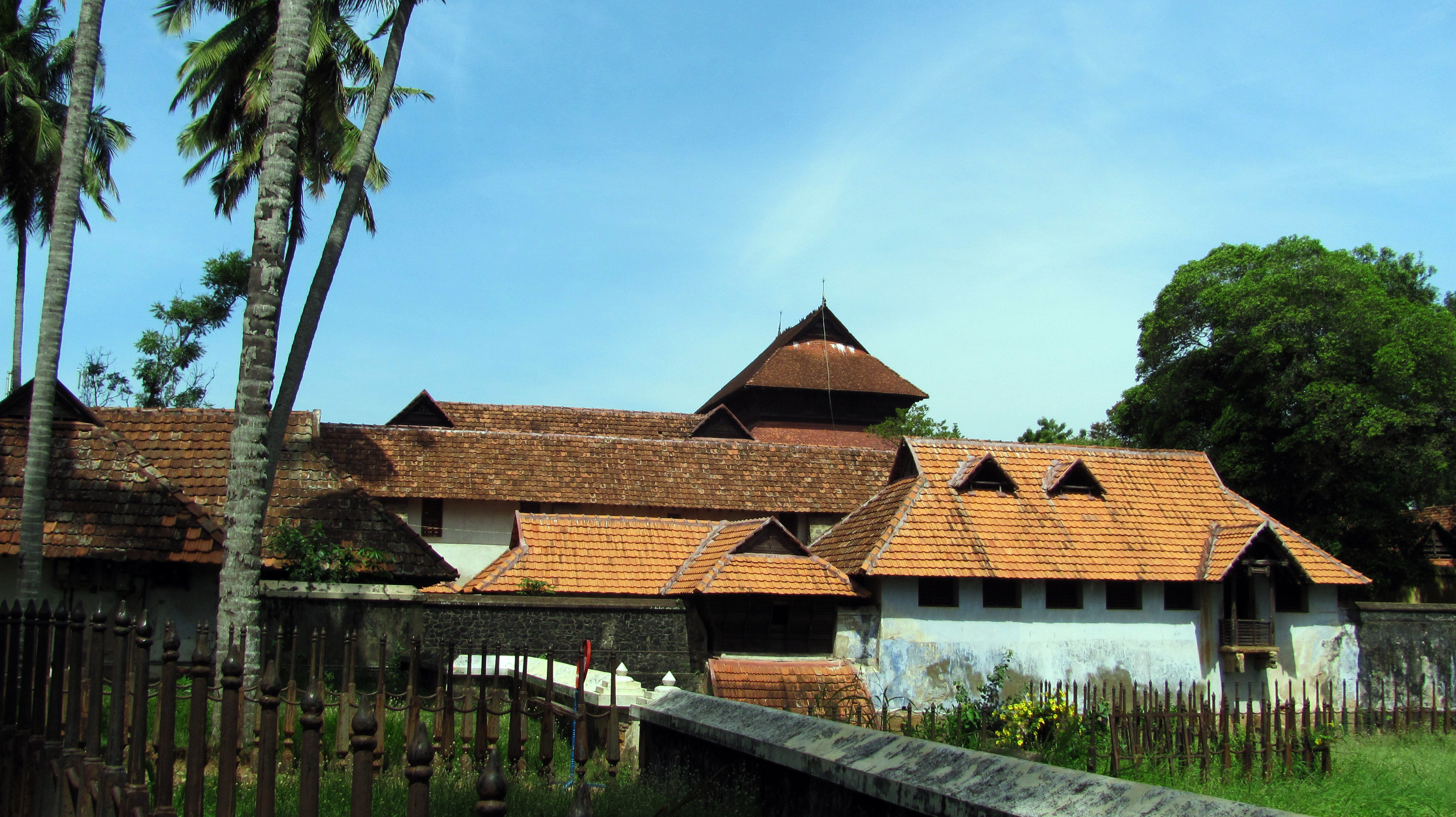
Padmanabhapuram Palace

Padmanabhapuram Palace was once the official residence of Travancore Kings. Padmanabhapuram Palace was built with wood in Kerala-style architecture in the 18th century by Travancore King Thiru Anizham Thirunal Marthanda Varma. The palace was situated in 6.5 acres in a 186-acre fort. It is under the control of the Kerala Government and is 2 km from Thuckalay.

=== Udayagiri Fort ===
Udayagiri Fort is 10 km from Parvathipuram. The fort, maintained by the Tamil Nadu Ministry of Forests, is situated on 22.5 hectares in Puliyoorkurichi.

=== Vattakkottai ===
Vattakkottai is a circular fort that was constructed along the seashore on the East coast. The fort is situated on 3.5 acres and is under the control of the Archaeological Department run by the Government of India. It is located 6 km north of Kanniyakumari and 2 km south of Anjugramam.

=== Vivekananda Rock ===
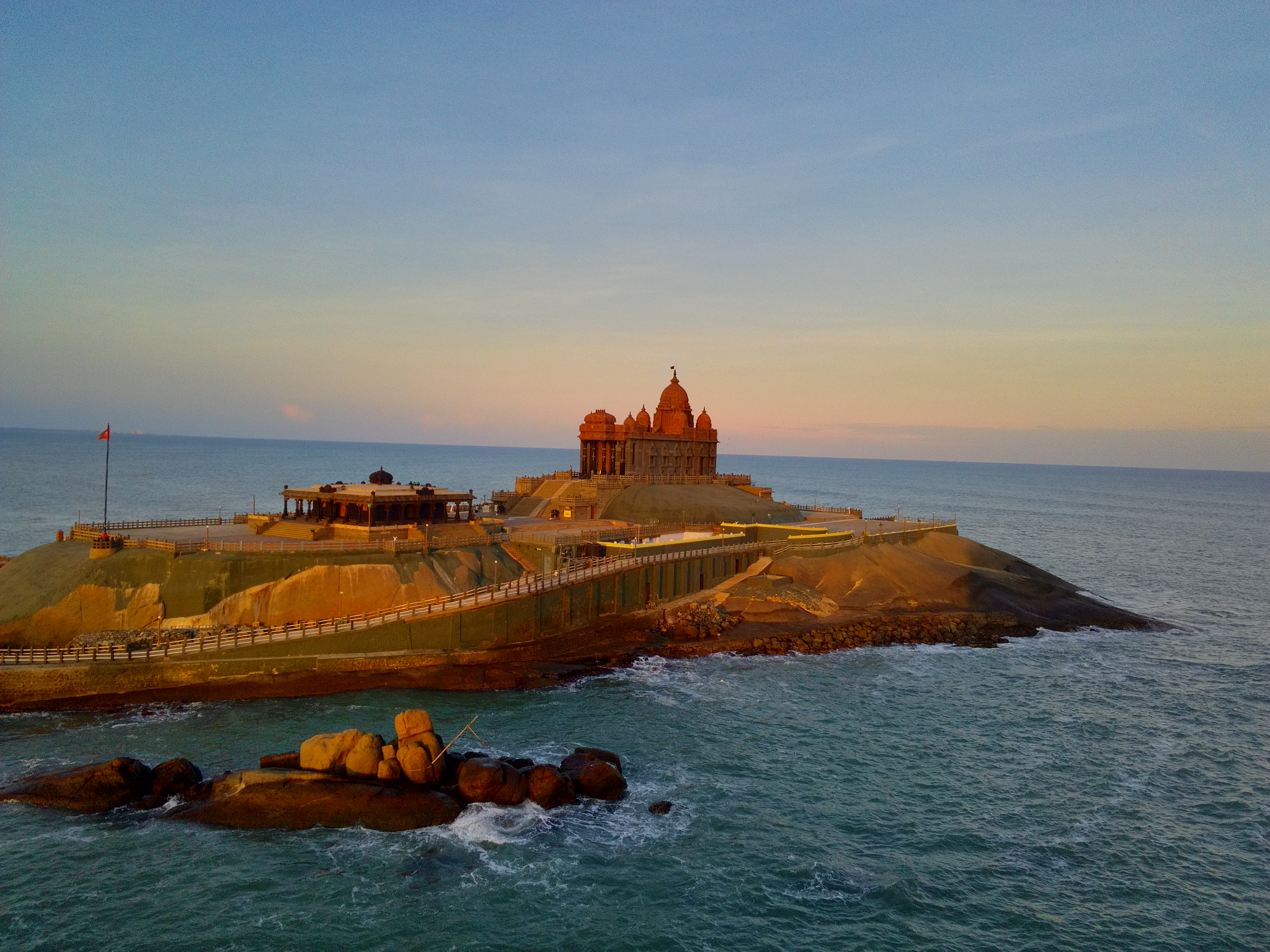
Vivekananda Rock Memorial

Vivekananda Rock Memorial is a monument in Vavathurai. It is 500 meters east in the mainland of Vavathurai. The rock was built in 1970 in honour of Swami Vivekananda who is said to have attained enlightenment on the rock. Vivekanand was a disciple of Swami Ramakrishna Paramahansa. According to local legends, Goddess Kumari performed Tapas in devotion of lord Shiva in these rocks. The rocks are surrounded by the Laccadive Sea.

=== Thanumalayan Temple ===
The Thanumalayan Temple, or Sthanumalayan Temple, is an important Hindu temple located in Suchindram. The temple is of importance to both Shaivaite and Vaishnavite sects of Hinduism, as the name Stanumalaya denotes the Trimurti; "Stanu" means Mahesha; "Mal" means Vishnu; and the "Ayan" means Brahma. It counts among the Abhimana Kshetrams in Vaishnavite traditions and is one of the 108 Shiva Temples revered by the Kerala Hindu culture.

=== Chitharal Jain Rock Cut Temple ===
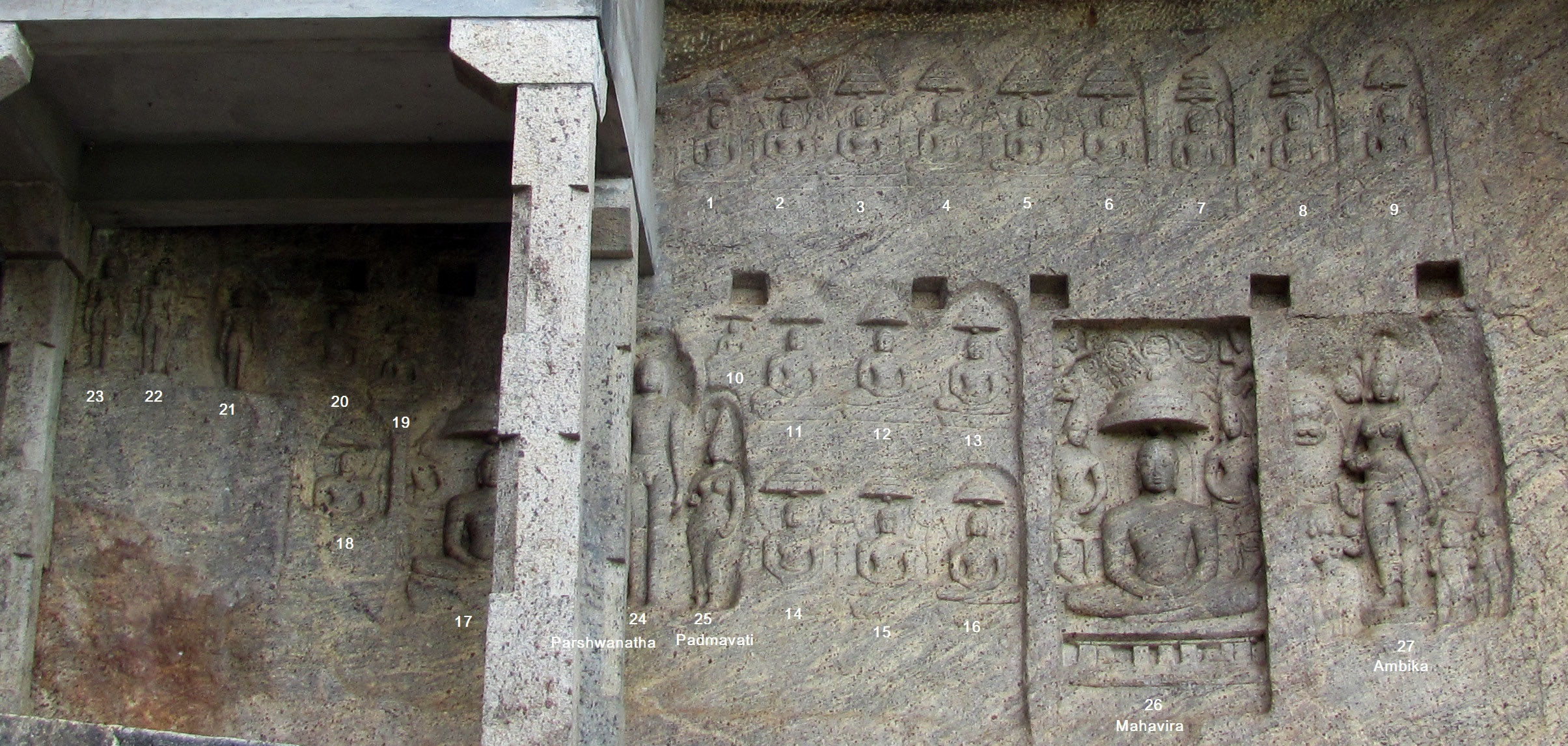
Jain bas-relief on the north side outer wall of the cave temple.

Chitharal Jain Rock Cut Temple is a temple in Chitharal which has a cave with carvings of Thirthankaras and attendant deities dating back to 9th century A.D.

== Festivals ==
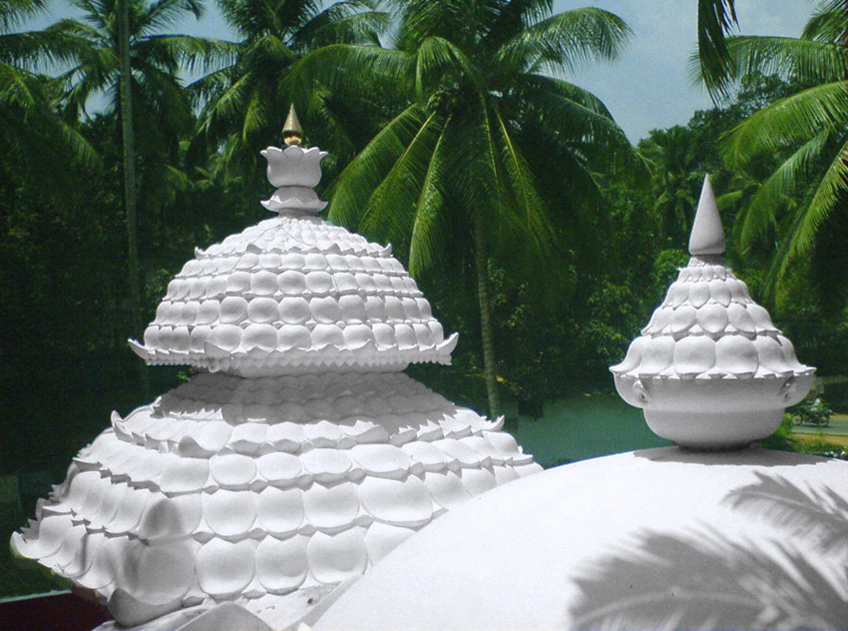
An octo-circular Ayyavazhi Nizhal Thangal near Thiruvattar on the Martandam-Kulasekaram road.

=== Ayya birthday Celebration ===
The Ayya Vaikunda Avataram of Ayyavazhi is widely celebrated throughout the district. The Kodiyettru Thirunal is celebrated in the religious headquarters of Swamithope Pathi and attracts large crowds from Tamil Nadu and across India.

=== Sucheendrum temple car festival ===
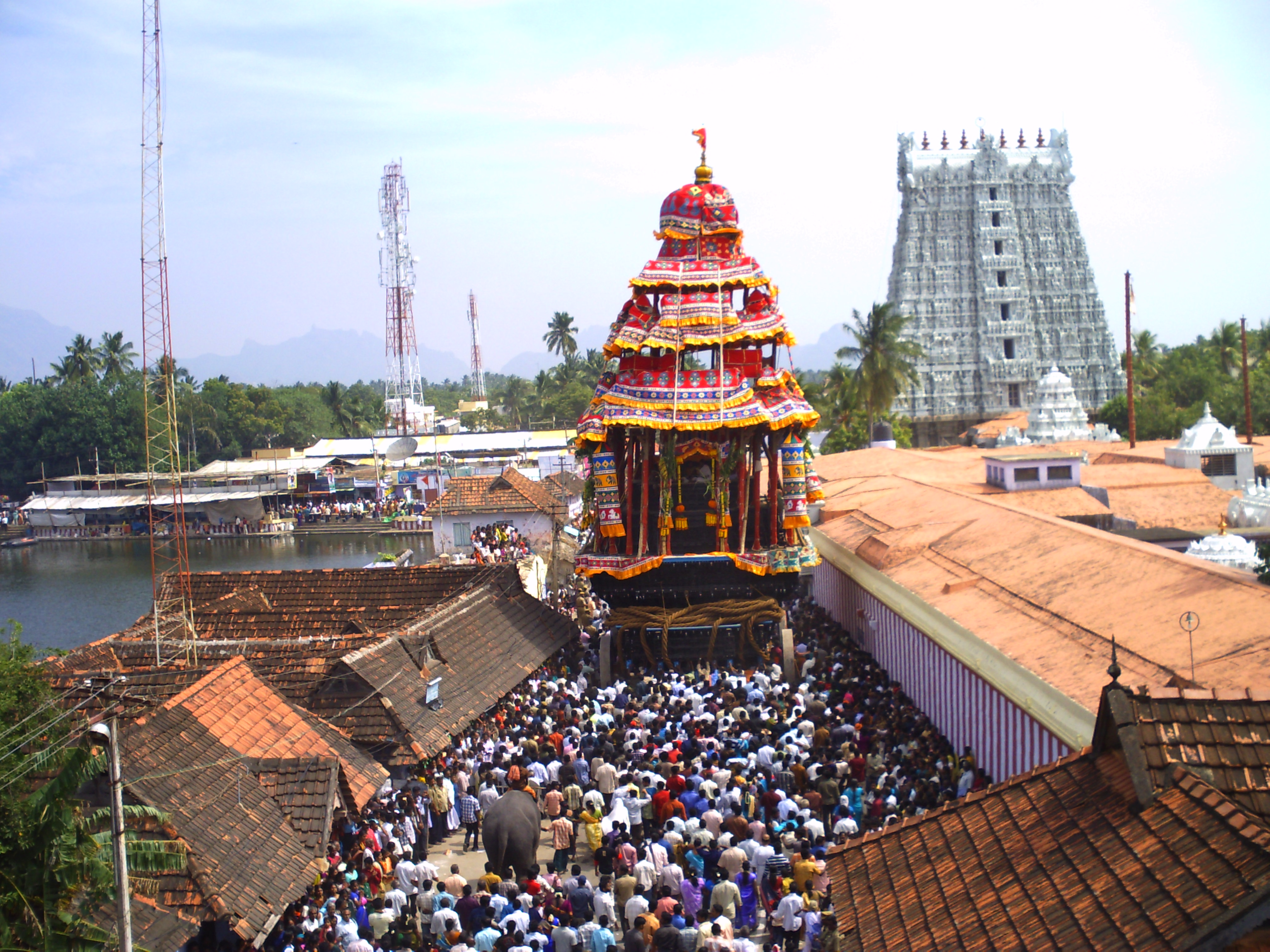
The Temple Chariot festival

The religious significance of the Thanumalayan Temple stems from the fact that the main statue of linga represents Siva (Sthanu), Vishnu (maal) and Brahma (Ayan), and gives the temple its name. The representation of the three central gods of Hinduism in one linga makes it unique in India. The 10-day Car Festival celebrated in this temple between December and January each year attracts thousands of people. Special worship practices are followed and the festival images of Sthanumalayan, Aram valartha Nayagi and Vinayagar are taken in the temple car around the streets of the temple. Another festival known as Teppam is celebrated during between April and May every year. The Sanskrit work Sucindrastalamahatmya gives a full-fledged legendary account of the origin and development of this temple.

=== Kanya Kumari, Bagavathi Amman temple festival ===
- Chitra Pournima Festival: on the Full moon day in May
- Navaratri festival: 9 day festival from September–October. The music artists get an opportunity to offer their artistic skill to the goddess by performing in the Navarathri Mandapam.
- Vaisakha festival: 10-day festival in May–June. During this festival Devi are taken in procession both in the morning and evening, and during Aaraatu the eastern door is opened. On the ninth day, the Thoni Ezhunellathu takes place. Devi is taken around the water on the western part in a boat.
- Kalabham festival: The idol is smeared in sandal paste on the last Friday of the month of Karkidaka or Aadi, in July–August.

=== Onam festival ===
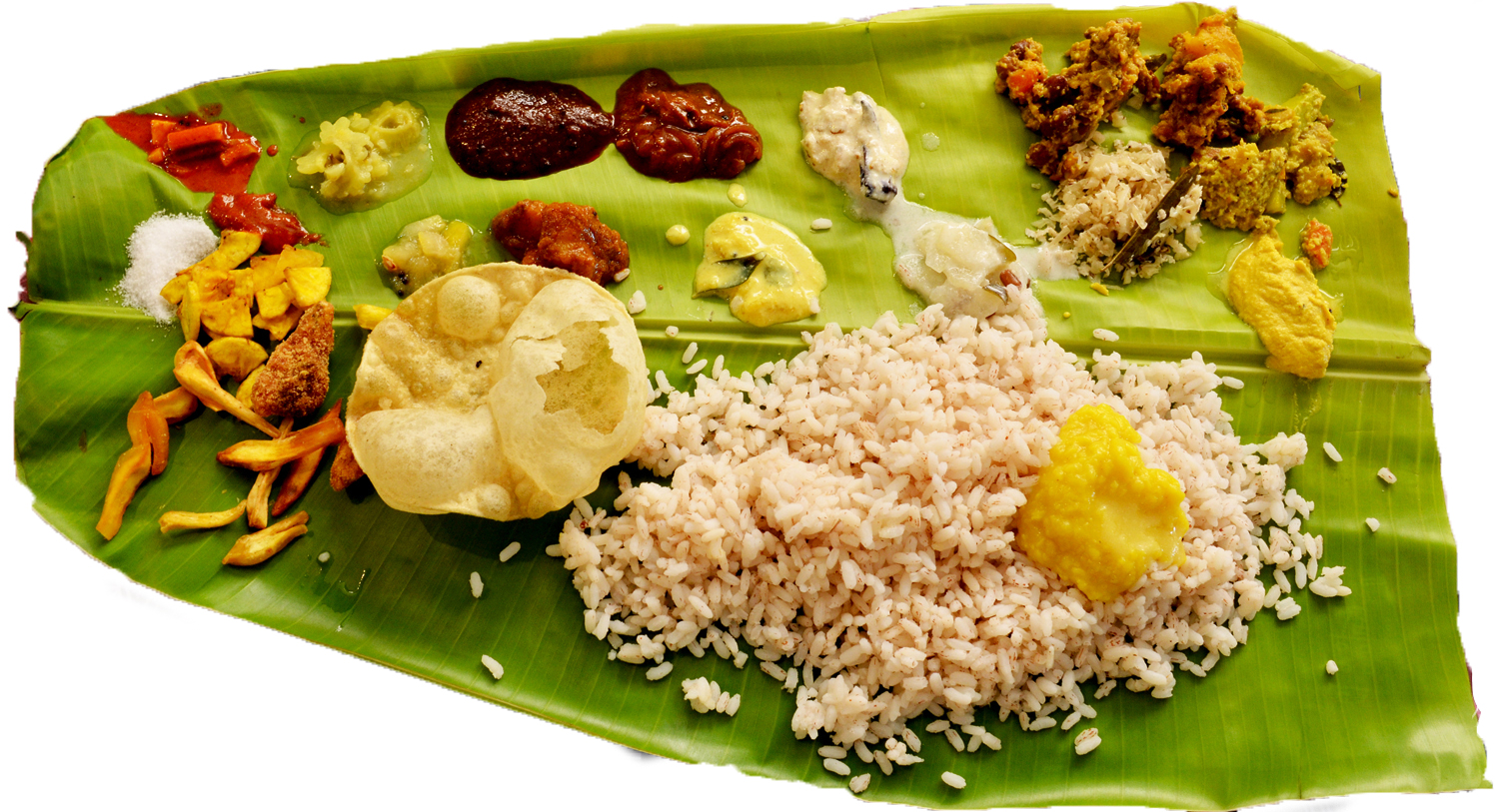
Onam sadya

Onam is widely celebrated in many places throughout Kanniyakumari district, especially in the western part of the district. This festival holds significance for most of the people in Kanniyakumari, as the district was formerly part of the Travancore kingdom. The date of Onam celebration is based on the Panchangam and falls on the 22nd Nakshatra Thiruvonam in the month Chingam of the Malayalam calendar, which in the Gregorian calendar falls between August and September.

=== Kuzhithurai Vavubali Exhibition ===
This ceremony takes place in July and August (Malayalam month Karkidakam). Along with the religious ceremony during this time, the famous annual exhibition fair – Vavubali Mela / Exhibition – was started by Shri. T.C Kesava Pillai, the MLC from Kuzhithurai in the 1900s. Today, this is continued by the Kuzhithurai Town Municipality.

== Transport and highways ==
=== Roadways ===
There are two major National Highways (NH) originating from Kanniyakumari town. One is National Highway 44 which connects Kanniyakumari with Srinagar of Jammu & Kashmir. The road passes through Madurai, Hosur, Bengaluru, Hyderabad, Nagpur, Jhansi, Delhi and Jalandhar and covers 3745 kilometres. The other is National Highway 66 which connects Kanniyakumari with Panvel (38 km from Mumbai) in Maharashtra. NH 66 runs roughly north–south parallel to the western Ghats. It passes through Thiruvananthapuram, Kochi, Kozhikode, Mangaluru, Udupi, Margoa and Ratnagiri. Nagercoil, the district capital is well connected with the rest of Tamil Nadu.

==== SETC Buses ====
The government transport body State Express Transport Corporation (SETC) operates direct buses to Chennai, Ootacamund, Coimbatore, Vellore, Chidambaram, Thiruchirappalli, Kodaikanal, Tirupur, Erode, Kalpakkam, Velankanni, and Thiruvannamalai. It also operates direct buses to Bengaluru, Pondicherry and Tirupati. Some bus services originate from Kanniyakumari, Colachel, Marthandam, Kulasekaram, Kaliyakkavilai, and Thiruvananthapuram.

==== TNSTC Buses ====
Tamil Nadu State Transport Corporation (TNSTC), another government transport body, operates direct buses to various destinations inside Tamil Nadu. Some of the terminating stations are Chennai, Tiruppur, Periyakulam, Kodaikanal, Rameswaram, Thiruchirappalli, Dindigul, Thanjavur, Palani, Salem, Coimbatore, Karaikudi, Kumily, Bodinayakkanur, Erode, and Sivakasi. Most of these buses start from Nagercoil while some buses start from Kanniyakumari, Marthandam, Colachel, Kulasekaram, and Kaliyakkavilai. TNSTC also operates frequent bus services to Madurai, Tirunelveli, Tiruchendur, Tuticorin, and Thiruvananthapuram.

==== KSRTC Buses ====
The Government of Kerala operates KSRTC Buses between Kerala and Tamilnadu from Thiruvananthapuram to Nagercoil, Kanniyakumari and KSRTC Bus between Holy Places Haripad, Thiruvananthapuram, Nagercoil, Mylaudy, Athankarai Pallivasal.

=== Railways ===
There is a railway station located at Kanniyakumari where trains terminate. The Vivek Express starting from Kanniyakumari is the longest-running train in India. It connects Kanniyakumari with Dibrugarh, in Assam. Nagercoil Junction railway station is the district's primary railway station located near Kottar and is also commonly known as Kottar Railway station. There is another railway station in Nagercoil known as Nagercoil Town railway station. There is rail connectivity from Nagercoil, the district capital, to most parts of the country with daily trains running to Mumbai, Chennai, Bengaluru, Guruvayur, Thiruvananthapuram, Madurai, Coimbatore, Trichy, Mangaluru and Tambaram, and weekly trains to New Delhi, Kolkata, Gujarat, Hyderabad, Pondicherry, Bilaspur, Rameswaram, northeast India and Jammu and Kashmir. The other stations in the Kanyakumari district are Eraniel railway station, Palliyadi railway station, Kuzhithurai railway station, and Kuzhithurai west railway station. Passenger trains connect Nagercoil with Thiruvananthapuram, Kollam, Punalur, Kottayam, Tirunelveli, Madurai, and Coimbatore.

=== Airways ===
The nearest international airport is Thiruvananthapuram International Airport 76 km from Kanniyakumari. The Civil Aviation Ministry is planning to construct an airport near Swamithoppu in Kanniyakumari District as the initiative attracts international tourists to the district.

== See also ==
- List of districts of Tamil Nadu
