= Kanyakumari Matti Banana =

Type of banana variety from Tamil Nadu, India

- Geographical indication
- Alternative names: Matti Pazham
- Description: Tamil Nadu banana is a banana variety cultivated in Tamil Nadu
- Type: Banana
- Area: Kanyakumari district
- Country: India
- Registered: 31 July 2023
- Official website: ipindia.gov.in

Kanyakumari Matti Banana is a variety of banana grown in the Indian state of Tamil Nadu. It is a common and widely cultivated crop in the Agatheeswaram, Thovalai, Thiruvattar talukas of Kanyakumari district. Kanyakumari Matti Banana is a traditional table banana cultivar with medicinal value, characterized by its fragrant, sweet, and slightly acidic flavor, firm texture, and powdery nature and is a rare variety grown only in the hills of South Travancore (Undivided Tamil Nadu and Kerala before States Reorganisation Act of 1956) which is near Nagercoil, Kanyakumari. It has three varieties: Semmatti (red-coloured), Then Matti (honey), and Malai Matti (Hill). Under its Geographical Indication tag, it is referred to as "Kanyakumari Matti Banana".

== Name ==
Kanyakumari Matti Banana (Matti Pazham) is a prized crop in Kanyakumari district and so named after it.

== Description ==
The Matti banana fruit has a 2.5–3 cm long apex resembling a crocodile's mouth, earning it the nickname "Crocodile Finger Banana". Unlike typical banana bunches that grow long, straight, and evenly, Matti Banana Fingers have a distinctive wind-blown appearance. The Matti banana has a low sugar content (8.7 TSS), making it suitable for infants, unlike other bananas that can cause cold issues due to high sugar. The banana flower hangs almost parallel to the ground, at a 95° angle to the stem. Matti bananas have shown strong resistance to Sigatoka disease.

== Geographical indication ==
It was awarded the Geographical Indication (GI) status tag from the Geographical Indications Registry, under the Union Government of India, on 31 July 2023 and is valid until 28 April 2030.

Kanyakumari Banana and Horticulture Farmers Producer Company Limited from Veeyanoor, proposed the GI registration of Kanyakumari Matti Banana. After filing the application in April 2021, the banana was granted the GI tag in 2023 by the Geographical Indication Registry in Chennai, making the name "Kanyakumari Matti Banana" exclusive to the bananas grown in the region. It thus became the third banana variety from Tamil Nadu after Sirumalai Hill Banana and the 59th type of goods from Tamil Nadu to earn the GI tag.

The GI tag protects the banana from illegal selling and marketing and gives it legal protection and a unique identity.

== See also ==
- Jalgaon banana
- Myndoli Banana
