= Kalikesam =

- Location in Tamil Nadu

Religion
- Affiliation: Hinduism
- District: Kanyakumari district
- Deity: Kali

Location
- Location: Kanyakumari Wildlife Sanctuary
- State: Tamil Nadu
- Country: India
- Interactive map of Kalikesam
- Coordinates: 8.4110°N 77.3915°E

Kalikesam is located in the Kanyakumari wild life sanctuary in Kanyakumari district in Tamil Nadu, India. The Kali temple situated here.

== How to Reach ==
This place is some 35 km from Nagercoil. There are buses from Nagercoil to this place but the frequency is low. Bus no. for this route is 4, 4A from Nagercoil and 330 from marthandam. In which the bus only one time goes to kalekesam around mid-noon time and there will be a special bus for here for full days during the festival season such as full moon days and other Tamil festive seasons. The best way to visit here is by your own transportation. By going on your own transportation you need to get an entry ticket from the check post, it's available near the keeriparai police station. Go slow and drive safely.

== Facilities ==
Previously it was a remote place that attracted many for drinking liquor and other illegal activities. At present, there is a check post provided to avoid these illegal activities within these forest areas. There is only one small shop that sells tea and biscuits.

If you are going from Kerala after Trivandrum City it is 85 km via road. After crossing the Kerala check post you have to take left from the highway for almost 35 km to reach this place. The roads are very bad throughout, be careful of the kids and cattle wandering in the road if you are driving. There is little mobile connectivity. So you can't call anybody if anything happens to you.

Access to Kalikesam temple is restricted and one needs to take permission from the Forest Officer, Nagercoil to enter the area.

Lot of deaths have happened in the area due to drowning.
