= Sothavilai Beach =

- village
- Country: India
- State: Tamil Nadu
- District: Kanyakumari

Languages
  - Official: Tamil
- Time zone: UTC+5:30 (IST)
- Nearest city: Nagercoil

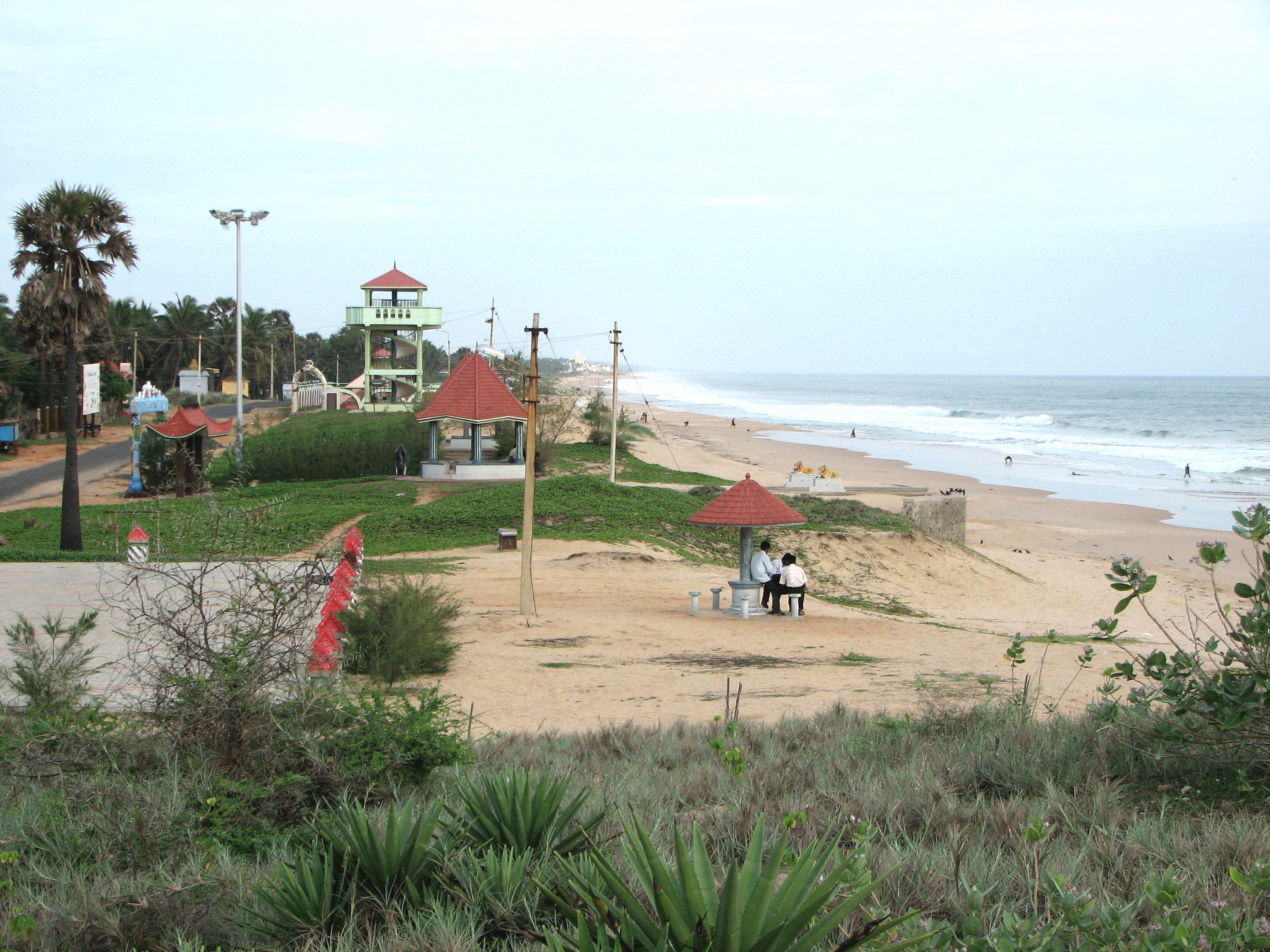
Chothavilai Beach, near Nagercoil

The Sotha Vilai beach is among the most important beaches in the district of Kanyakumari, Tamil Nadu. The beach here stretches over 4 km which makes it one of the longest beaches in Tamil Nadu. Waves in this beach are dangerous not suitable for kids and risky for adults. It was also one of the most seriously affected areas of the district during the 2004 Tsunami.
