= Kodayar River =

River in Kanyakumari, Tamil Nadu, India

Coordinates: 8°20′33″N 77°15′06″E

Kodayar is a river in the Kanyakumari district of Tamil Nadu state, India, which originates from the Kodayar Lake. The vaavubhali festival is held on the river.
