= Rajakkamangalam block =

Rajakkamangalam block is a revenue block in the Kanyakumari district of Tamil Nadu, India. It has a total of 15 panchayat villages.
