= Pahrali River =

River in Tamil Nadu, India

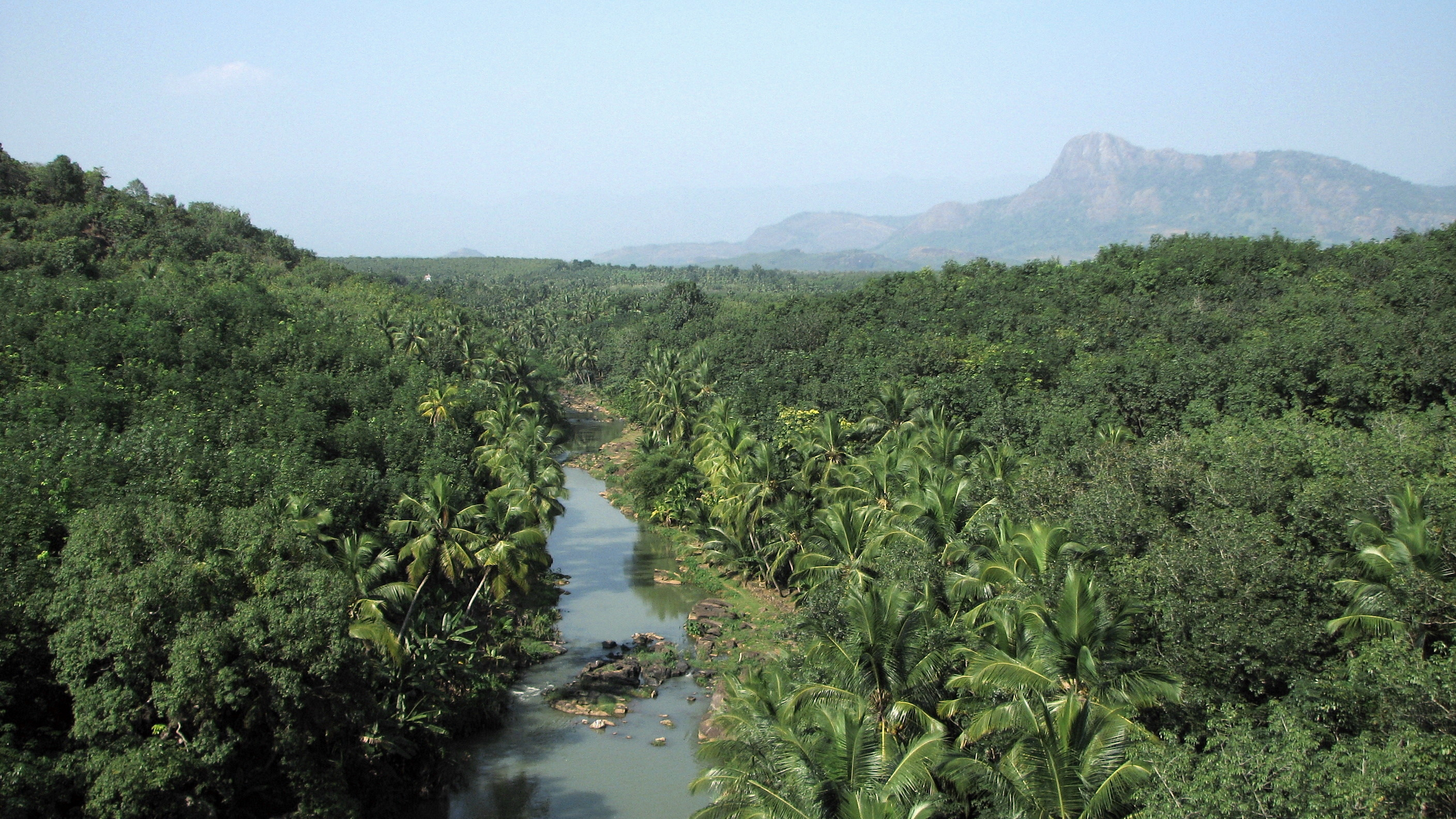
Pahrali river viewed from Mathur Hanging Trough bridge.

Pahrali River or Parazhiyar flows through the Kanyakumari District in southern India. It originates in the Mahendragiri hills. The Mathur Hanging Trough, the highest and longest aqueduct in Asia, was built over it near the hamlet of Mathur. Perunchani dam is constructed across Pahrali river.
