= Agastheeswaram block =

Agasteeswaram block is a revenue block in the Kanyakumari district of Tamil Nadu, India. It has a total of 12 panchayat villages which are Eraviputhoor, Kovalam, Kulasekarapuram, Karumpattoor, Leepuram, Maharajapuram, North Thamaraikulam, Nalloor, Panchalingapuram, Ramapuram, Swamythoppu, Therakalpudur.

It is situated 23 km away from Nagercoil, which is both district & sub-district headquarter of Agasteeswaram village. The total geographical area of village is 144.1 hectares. Agasteeswaram has a total population of 7,638 peoples. There are about 1,945 houses in Agasteeswaram village. Kottaram is nearest town to Agasteeswaram.
