= Kanniyakumari Wildlife Sanctuary =

Protected area in Kanniyakumari, Tamil Nadu, India

Coordinates: 8.39°N 77.37°E

- IUCN category IV (habitat/species management area)
- Location within Tamil Nadu Location within India
- Interactive map of Kanniyakumari Wildlife Sanctuary
- Location: Kanniyakumari, Tamil Nadu, India
- Area: 402.4 km^{2} (155.4 sq mi)
- Established: 2007

Kanniyakumari Wildlife Sanctuary is a 402.4 km^{2} (155.4 sq mi) protected area in Kanyakumari district, Tamil Nadu, South India declared in February 2008. The area is a tiger habitat. Seven rivers originate in the forest including the Thamirabarani River and Pahrali River.

== Wildlife ==
The region is one of the most diverse wildlife forest locations in India. Several new species of plants, amphibians and insects discovered here are found nowhere else, making it an endemic region. A rare mushroom variety known as bioluminescent mushroom was spotted in Kanniyakumari Wildlife Sanctuary.The area is a wildlife corridor with high biodiversity, and in addition to tigers, is home to the threatened species: Indian bison, elephant, Indian rock python, lion-tailed macaque, mouse deer, Nilgiri tahr and sambar deer.

== Habitation ==
There are a few tribal villages in the sanctuary and adjoining reserve forests.

== Threats ==
The Arasu Rubber Corporation had destroyed 12,000 acres of forest land to promote rubber estates. This triggered wide protests among the locals and environmentalists. The State government got a stay order and has continued turning forests into rubber plantations by leasing the land to third party contractors and landlords. Another incident was the uprooting of 20,000 forest trees in the guise of clearing the damage caused due to Cyclone Ockhi. This caused anthropogenic disturbance.
