= Kurunthancode block =

Kurunthancode block is a revenue block in the Kanyakumari district of Tamil Nadu, India. It has a total of 9 panchayat villages.
