= Kaliyakkavilai =

Neighbourhood in Kanyakumari district, Tamil Nadu, India

- Town
- Location in Tamil Nadu, India
- Coordinates: 8°19′22″N 77°09′14″E
- Country: India
- State: Tamil Nadu
- District: Kanyakumari

Population (2001)
  - Total: 13,307

Languages
  - Official: Tamil,Malayalam
- Time zone: UTC+5:30 (IST)
- Vehicle registration: TN-75

Kaliyakkavilai is a town panchayat in Kanyakumari district in the Indian state of Tamil Nadu, close to the Tamil Nadu-Kerala border. It lies on the Kochi-Thiruvananthapuram-Kanyakumari National Highway 47.

== Demographics ==
As of the 2011 India census, Kaliyakkavilai had a population of 15,625, with an average literacy of 81.4%. 10.1% of the population were children at the time of the census.
