= Vavathurai =

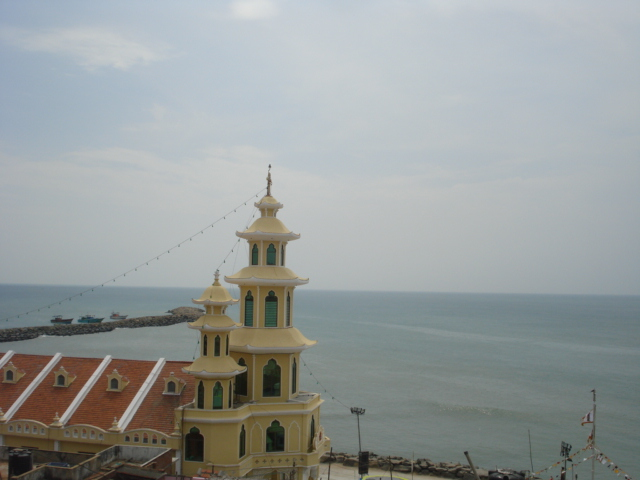
Arokiyanathar Alayam, Vavathurai

Vavathurai is a village in Kanyakumari in the state of Tamil Nadu, India. The closest major city is Nagercoil, the administrative headquarters of Kanyakumari District, (18 km).

Located at the sea shore of Vivekananda Rock Memorial. The place adds beauty to Kanyakumari and is one of the important places to see in Kanyakumari. One can see sun set at all the seasons. The Church is built in the sea shore
