= Nagercoil division =

Coordinates: 8.17°N 77.43°E

Nagercoil division is a revenue division in the Kanyakumari district of Tamil Nadu, India.
