= Thuckalay block =

Revenue block in India

Thuckalay block is a revenue block in the Kanyakumari district of Tamil Nadu, India. It has a total of 7 panchayat villages.
