= Thovalai block =

Revenue block in India

Thovalai block is a revenue block in the Kanyakumari district of Tamil Nadu, India. It has a total of 16 panchayat villages.
