= Eda Nadu =

Village in Alappuzha District, Kerala, India

Edanadu is a village situated 3 kilometres (1.9 mi) from Chengannur in Alappuzha district, Kerala, India. It is part of Chengannur municipality. It lies on the banks of the Pampa River. Edanadu is situated in the extreme eastern part of Alappuzha district and forms the geographical border between Alappuzha and Pathanamthitta district.

In August 2018, the area was affected by floods and NDRF were called into service for support operations.
