= Perunchani Dam =

Dam in Tamil Nadu, India

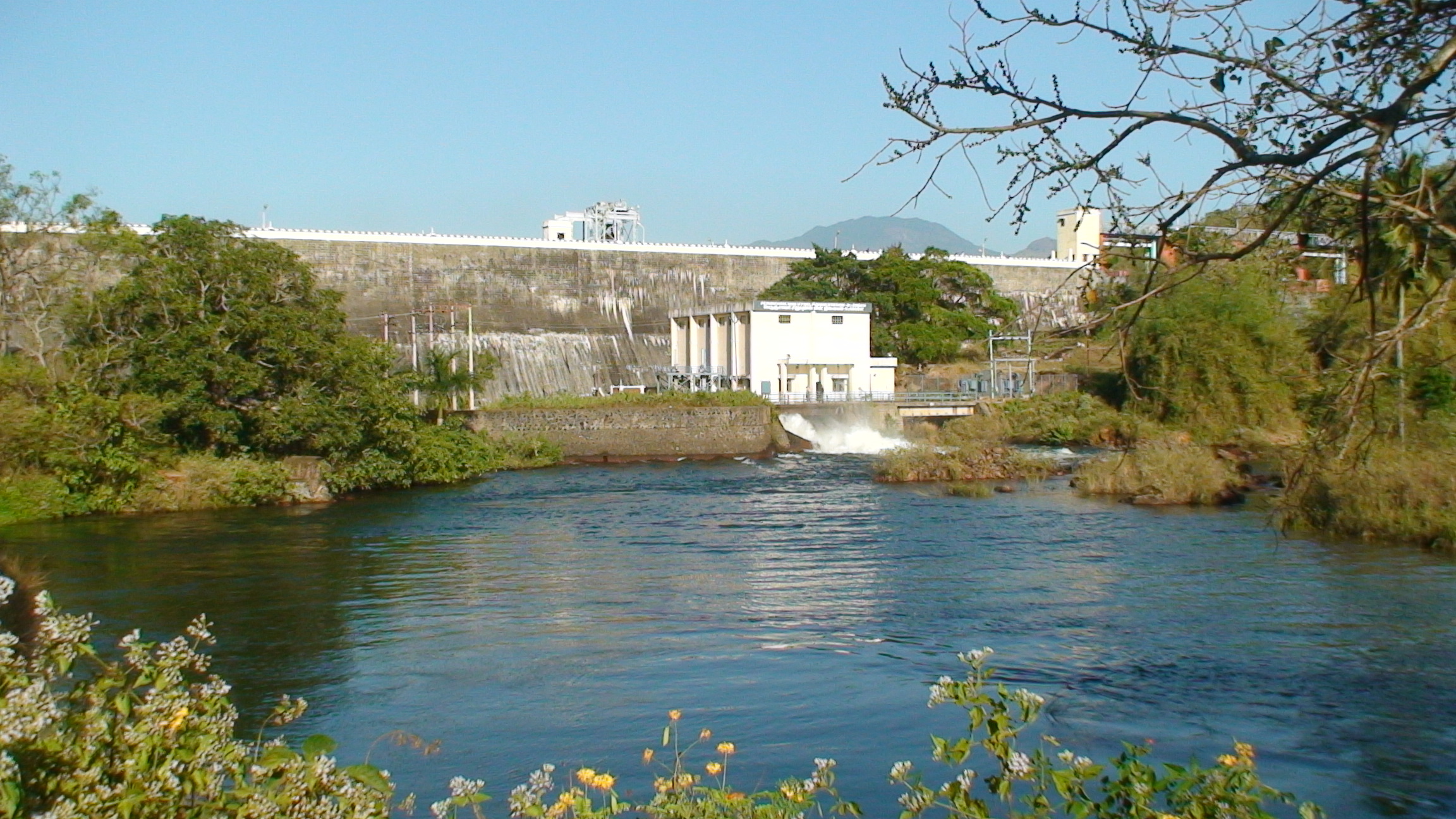
- Perunchani Dam

- Location within Tamil Nadu
- Official name: Perunchani Dam
- Country: India
- Location: Kanyakumari District, Tamil Nadu
- Coordinates: 8°23′4″N 77°22′28″E
- Opening date: December 1952
- Owners: Water Resources Organization, Government of Tamil Nadu

Dam and spillways
- Type of dam: Straight Gravity Masonry dam with concrete Spillway
- Impounds: Paralayar River, a tributary of Tamiraparani River
- Height: 36.27 metres (119.0 ft) above foundation
- Length: 308 metres (1,010 ft)
- Spillways: One
- Spillway capacity: 894.91 m^{3} (31,603 cu ft) per second

Reservoir
- Creates: Perunchani Reservoir
- Total capacity: Live storage 818,400,000 m^{3} (2.890×10^{10} cu ft)
- Catchment area: 158.4 square kilometres (61.2 sq mi)

Power Station
- Operator: Tamil Nadu Green Energy Corporation Limited
- Commission date: Unit 1: 21 December 2005; Unit 2: January 22, 2006
- Turbines: 2 × 650 KW
- Installed capacity: 1.3 MW

Perunchani Dam is an irrigation dam at Perunchani, Kanyakumari District, in the state of Tamil Nadu, India. It is one of the dams of the Kodayar Irrigation System. As there was water deficiency in the Kodayar Irrigation System, Perunchani Dam was constructed in December 1952 to store flood water of the Paralayar River as an extension. It was built about 1 km (0.62 mi) upstream of the Puthen dam on the Paralayar River. The irrigation system became operational on 2 September 1953. It feeds the left bank irrigation canal system of the Puthen dam, which is the terminal structure of the system.

== Topography ==
The dam is built between two hillocks (part of the Western Ghats) across the Paralayar River, a tributary of the Tamaraparani River, also known locally as the Kuzhithuraiar, and is part of the basin that constitutes the west-flowing rivers from Tadri to Kanyakumari. Tamaraparani River rises in the Western Ghats and flows through a distance of 56 km (35 mi) before debouching into the Arabian Sea. The catchment area at the Perunchani Dam site is 158.4 km^{2} (61.2 sq mi). The reservoir is thickly forested and inhabited by wild animals such as tiger, elephants, and deer. The tribal community of Kanikars resides around the periphery of the reservoir.

The dam is located about 43 km (27 mi) from Nagercoil, the administrative headquarters-town of Kanyakumari District, and about 10 km (6.2 mi) from the town of Kulasekharam.

== Water resources ==
The average annual rainfall in the catchment is 2,240 mm (88 in), and the average annual yield at the dam site is 218,000,000 m^{3} (7.7×10^{9} cu ft).

== Features ==
The dam was constructed between 1948 and 1953 by the then State of Travancore-Cochin. The height of the straight gravity masonry dam above the deepest foundation is 36.27 m (119.0 ft), with Full Reservoir Level (FRL) at 93.3 m (306 ft), which is also the Maximum Water Level (MWL). The dam is 308 m (1,010 ft) long. The gross storage capacity of the reservoir is 818,400,000 m^{3} (2.890×10^{10} cu ft) at the FRL, which is also the effective storage capacity. The reservoir area is 9,620 ha (23,800 acres). The spillway, with its crest at 88.7 m (291 ft), is designed to pass a discharge of 894.91 m^{3} (31,603 cu ft) per second. There are four spillway gate openings, each 12.19 m × 4.57 m (40.0 ft × 15.0 ft) in size. The total volume of material content in the dam is 51,000 m^{3} (1,800,000 cu ft). The project lies in Seismic Zone-III. The dam is provided with drainage gallery of 45.7 m (150 ft) length in the central section of the river. It serves the purpose of collecting seepage water from the foundation of the dam and also as an inspection gallery, and measures 1.52 m × 2.29 m (5 ft 0 in × 7 ft 6 in).

The fishing operation in the reservoir is limited to the indigenous Puntus spp.

== Irrigation system ==
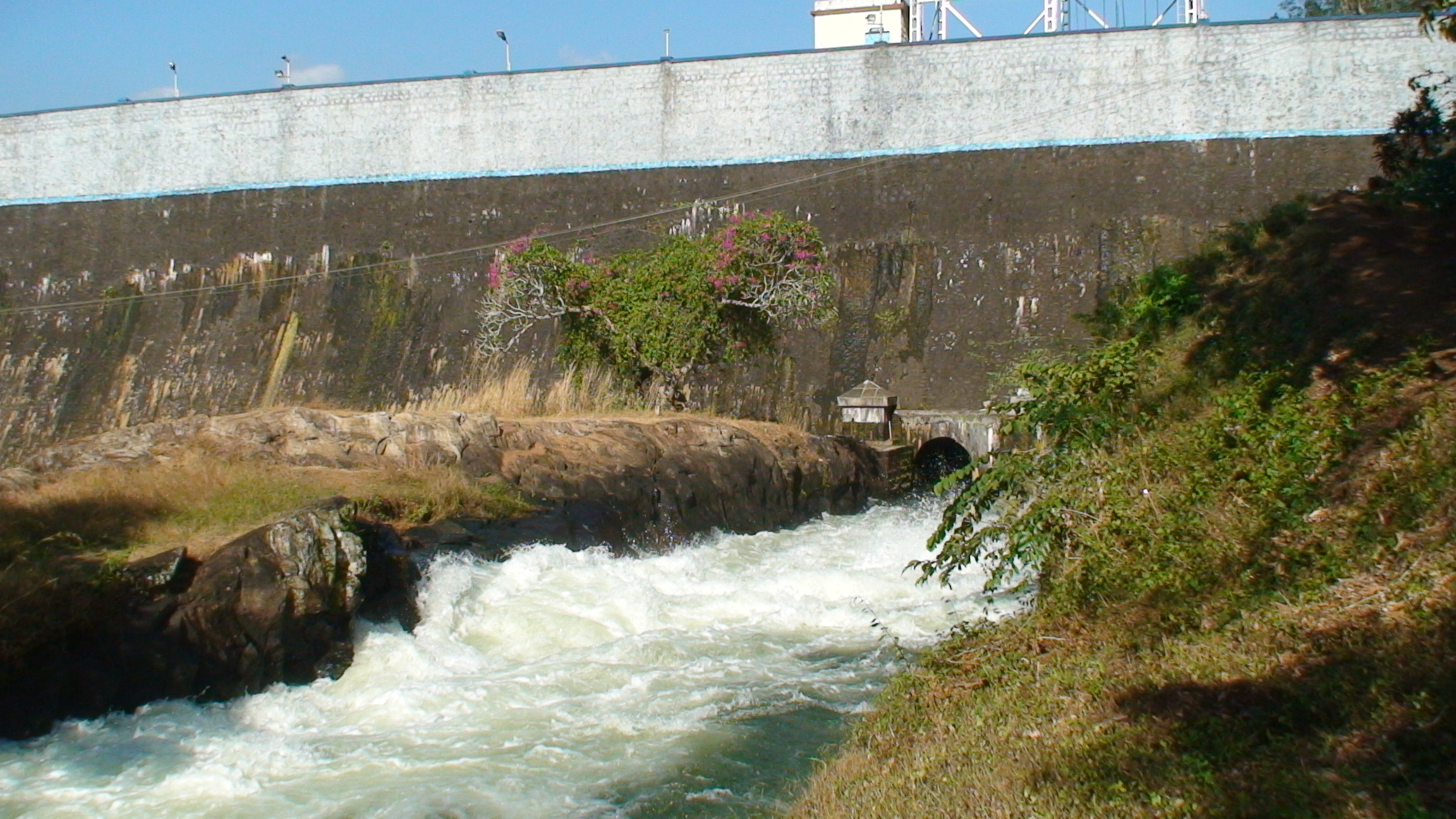
Pechiparai dam, the first dam of the Kodiyar Irrigation System

The dam is part of the Kodiyar Irrigation System, as its stored waters are utilized only through a combined canal system which provides irrigation to a total command area of 36,836 ha (91,020 acres). The irrigation system consists of four dams and associated storage reservoirs, anicuts, and canal system. The first project to be implemented under this system was the Pechiparai dam, built during 1948–53; the Kodiyar Left Bank Canal (KLBC) taking off from this dam feeds the Puthen dam, which is a weir that was remodeled under World Bank assistance during the 2000s. The next two dams to be built were the Chittar dam I and Chittar dam II in the period from 1964 to 1970; the storage waters of these two reservoirs were also fed into the KLBC. The storage from the Perunchani reservoir is also fed into the Puthen weir.

During the period 1964-70 the storage capacity of the Pachipprai and Parunchani dams was increased by raising the full reservoir level by 1.83 m (6 ft 0 in); this involved rising, strengthening, and improvement measures. The KLBC, which was originally designed to carry a discharge of 24.07 m^{3} (850 cu ft) per second, was remodeled in 1965 to carry a discharge of 32.99 m^{3} (1,165 cu ft) per second. There is a small branch canal taking off from the KLBC, before it joins the Puthen weir, which has an irrigation command of 6,073 ha (15,010 acres). The interlinking of the Perunchani and Chittar dams provides an additional irrigation potential of 15,000 acres (6,100 ha) in the system.

== Bibliography ==
- Baliga, B. S (1995). Madras District Gazetteers: Kanniyakumari District. Superintendent, Government Press.
- Chicago, University of (2005). Kisan World. Sakthi Sugars, Limited.
- Kerala, University of (1988). Journal of Kerala Studies. University of Kerala.
- Senapati, Nilamani; Sahu, N. K. (1995). Orissa District Gazetteers: Kanniyakumari District. Superintendent, Orissa Government Press.
- Sugunan, V. V. (1995). Reservoir Fisheries of India. Food & Agriculture Org. ISBN 978-92-5-103673-0.
