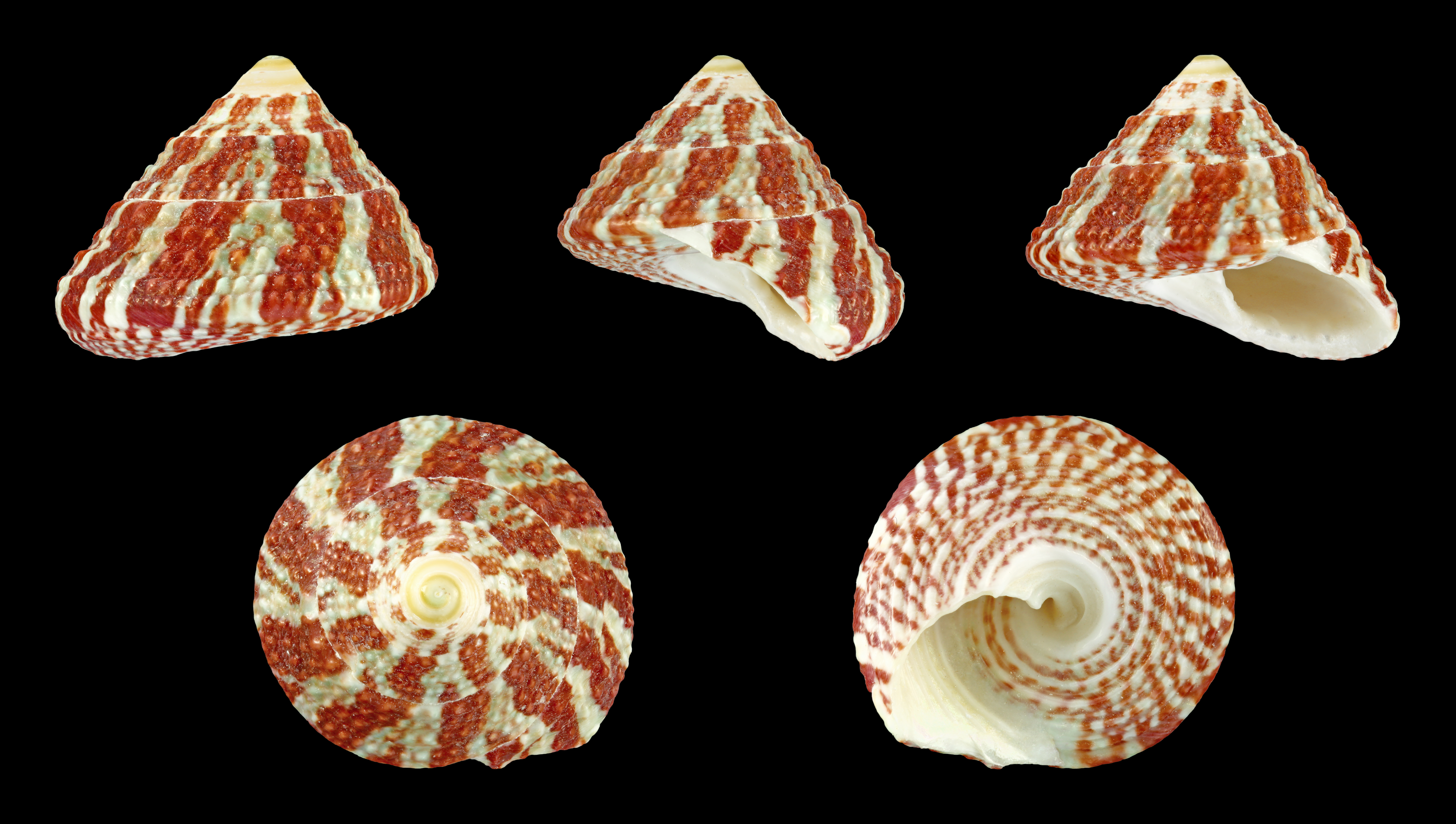
- Five views of a shell of Trochus radiatus

Scientific classification
- Kingdom: Animalia
- Phylum: Mollusca
- Class: Gastropoda
- Subclass: Vetigastropoda
- Order: Trochida
- Superfamily: Trochoidea
- Family: Trochidae
- Genus: Trochus
- Species: T. radiatus

Binomial name
- Trochus radiatus Gmelin, 1791

Synonyms
- Clanculus radiatus Gmelin, 1791; Trochus bicolor Perry, G., 1811; Trochus eucosmus Philippi, 1848; Trochus festivus Philippi, 1844; Trochus surgillatus Reeve, 1861; Trochus vividus Reeve, 1861

= Trochus radiatus =

Species of gastropod

Trochus radiatus, common name the radiate top shell, is a species of sea snail, a marine gastropod mollusk in the family Trochidae, the top snails.

== Description ==
The thick, rather solid, trochoidal shell has a moderately elevated spire and is false-umbilicate. Its length varies between 17 mm and 40 mm. The color of the shell is yellowish whitish, tinged with green, and radiately striped with broad or narrow uninterrupted, axial, crimson flames. The base of the shell is white or pink, radiately marked or minutely speckled with red. The aperture, columella and umbilical area are pearl white. The spire has nearly straight outlines. The apex is acute, generally eroded and orange-colored. The about 7 whorls are planulate, sometimes a little concave in the middle. The body whorl has a sharply angled periphery. The shell upper surface is circled by irregularly beaded bands, 5 or 6 on each whorl, uneven in size, the upper row largest;. The bead in each whorl is larger on the upper row than those at lower rows, The base of the shell is nearly flat, concentrically lirate. These lirae are granulose, rather coarse, with broad interspaces, which are frequently occupied by revolving lirulae or striae. The oblique columella is strongly plicate above, its edge nearly smooth and shows blunt teeth. The large aperture is subrhomboidal, lirate within, and grooved. The basal lip thickened and crenate The umbilicus is wide and deep. The umbilical tract is funnel-shaped, rather broad, with a central rib. The parietal wall is scarcely callous, showing the color of the base, and with a white spiral rib in the middle.

Normally adult and large shells are encrusted with algae. Shells washed on beaches are usually clean, exposing the underlying pearly layer below the surface. This species feeds on encrusting algae.

The conspicuously radiate color pattern and the sculpture, consisting of coarse granulose lirae with interstitial lirulae both above and below, as well as the wide umbilical tract and eroded corneous or orange apex, will serve to distinguish this form.

== Distribution ==
This species occurs on intertidal rock boulders in the Indian Ocean off Madagascar and in the Western Pacific.
