= Vellimalai =

Coordinates: 8°17′14″N 77°21′19″E

- panchayat town
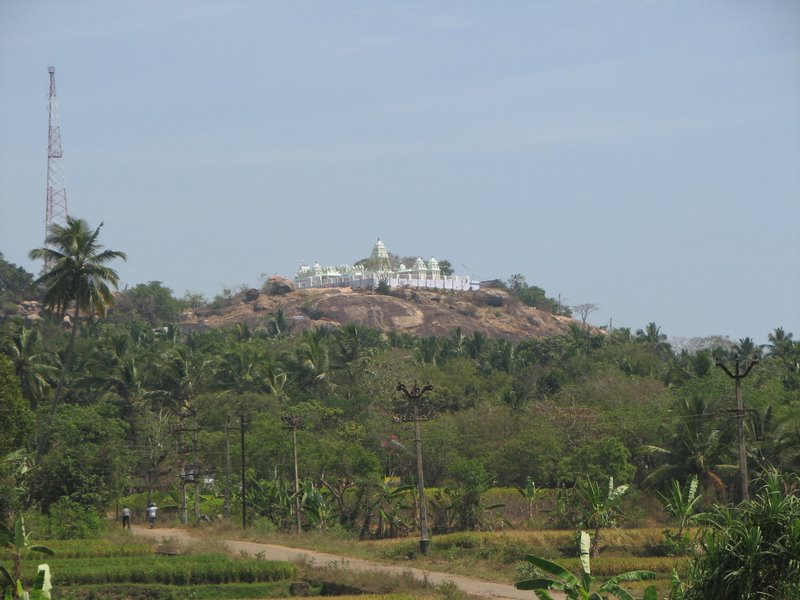
- Vellimalai
- Interactive map of Vellimalai
- Country: India
- State: Tamil Nadu
- District: Kanniyakumari

Population (2001)
  - Total: 11,758

Languages
  - Official: Tamil
- Time zone: UTC+5:30 (IST)

Vellimalai is a panchayat town in Kanniyakumari district in the Indian state of Tamil Nadu.

== Demographics ==
As of 2001 India census, Vellimalai had a population of 11,758. Males constitute 50% of the population and females 50%. Vellimalai has an average literacy rate of 79%, higher than the national average of 59.5%: male literacy is 82%, and female literacy is 76%. In Vellimalai, 10% of the population is under 6 years of age.

Vellimalai is famous for the Lord Murugan Temple called as "Murugan Koil" located atop of the hill Vellimalai. It is popularly believed that Valli was born here, and raised by a tribal king to marry with Lord Murugan in a Love marriage. Nonetheless, similar story is associated with another namesake place, Vallimalai in Vellore district and Tiruttani of Tiruvallur district in the far north of Tamil Nadu.

Lord Murugan Temple attracts many pilgrims from the surrounding areas. The famous festivals of the temple are "Sasti Sura Samkaram"- killing of Suran, the demon leader, by Lord Murugan and Vaikasi Visakam. From the top of the hill, the major part of the green Kanya Kumari District can be viewed, which offers a mind-blowing experience for nature lovers.
