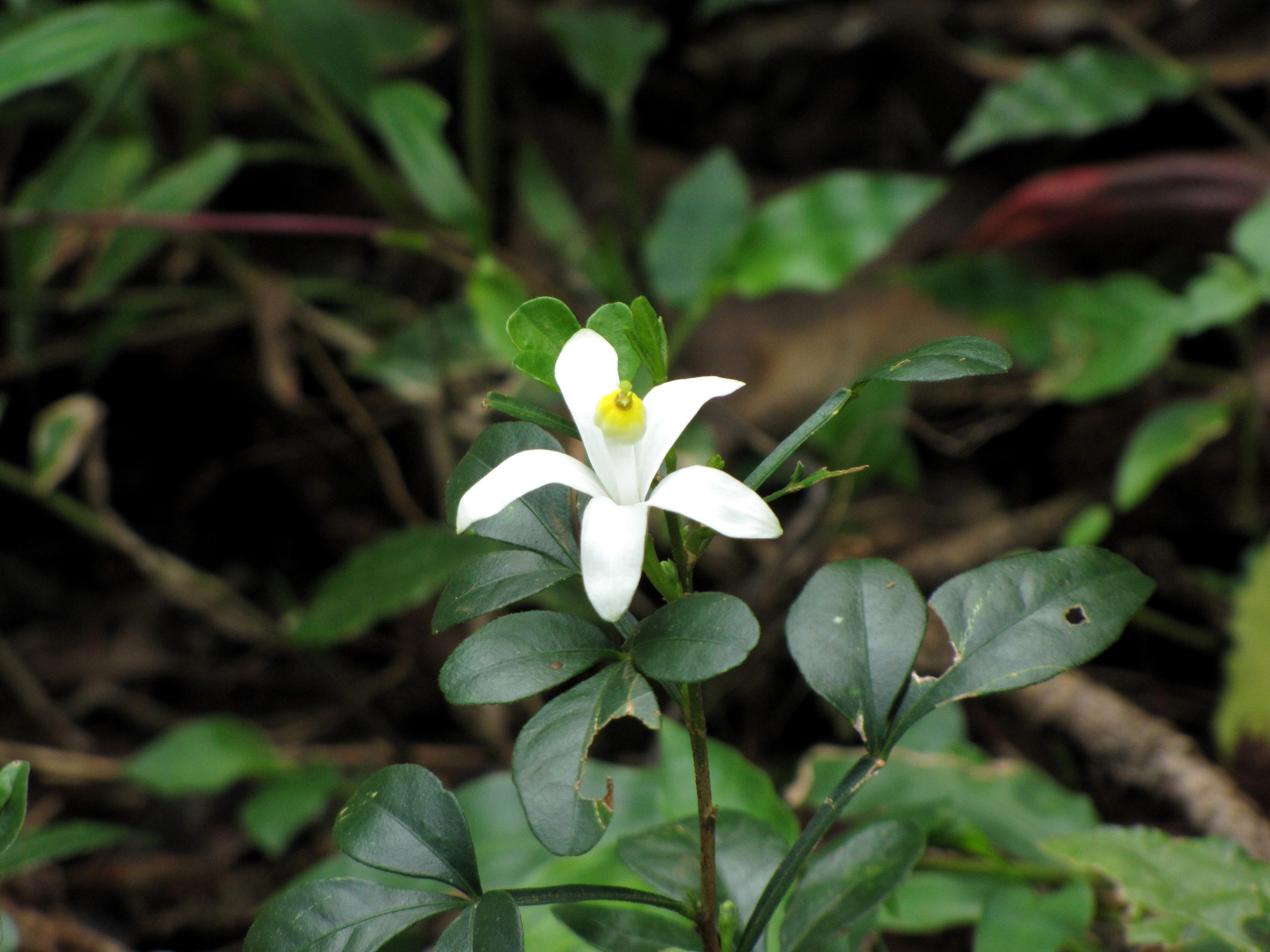
- Naregamia alata

Scientific classification
- Kingdom: Plantae
- Clade: Tracheophytes
- Clade: Angiosperms
- Clade: Eudicots
- Clade: Rosids
- Order: Sapindales
- Family: Meliaceae
- Genus: Naregamia; Wight & Arn.
- Species: N. alata

Binomial name
- Naregamia alata Wight & Arn. (1834)

Synonyms
- Nelanaregam Adans. (1763); Naregamia dentata Miq. ex Hook.f. (1875), not validly publ.; Turraea alata (Wight & Arn.) Cheek (1996)

= Naregamia =

Genus of plants

Naregamia is a monotypic genus of flowering plants belonging to the family Meliaceae. The only species is Naregamia alata.

Its native range is Western India.
