= Thiruvattar block =

Revenue block in India

Thiruvattar block is a revenue block in the Kanyakumari district of Tamil Nadu, India. It has a total of 10 panchayat villages.
