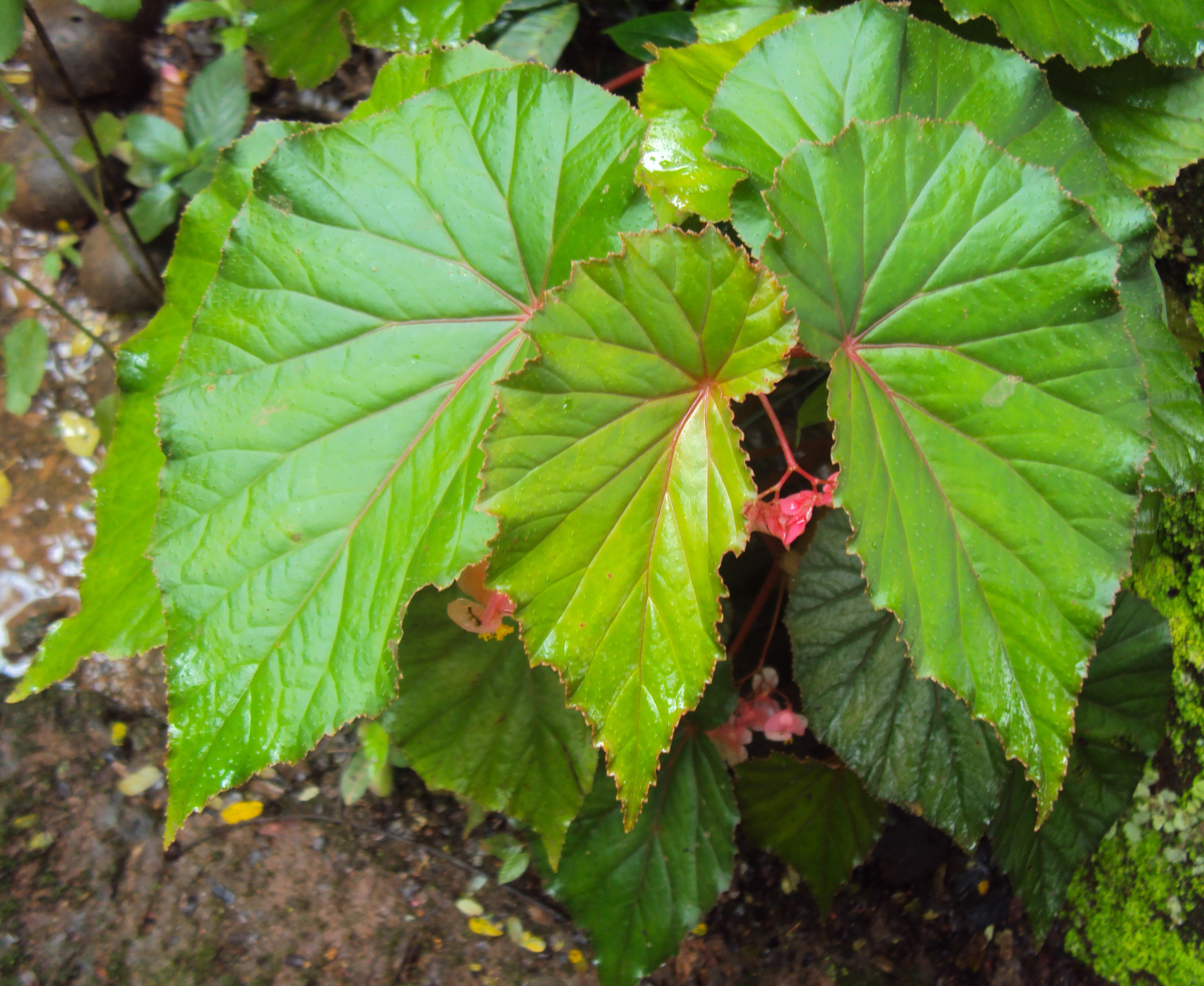
- Foliage

Scientific classification
- Kingdom: Plantae
- Clade: Tracheophytes
- Clade: Angiosperms
- Clade: Eudicots
- Clade: Rosids
- Order: Cucurbitales
- Family: Begoniaceae
- Genus: Begonia
- Species: B. malabarica

Binomial name
- Begonia malabarica Lam.

Synonyms
- List: Begonia fallax A.DC.; Begonia hydrophila Miq.; Begonia rubrosetulosa (Hassk.) A.DC.; Diploclinium lindleyanum Wight; Mitscherlichia rubrosetulosa Hassk.

= Begonia malabarica =

Species of flowering plant

Begonia malabarica, the Malabar begonia, is a species of flowering plant in the family Begoniaceae, native to India and Sri Lanka. It has antibacterial properties.
