= Meenakshipuram, Nagercoil =

- Neighbourhood
- Meenakshipuram, Nagercoil (Tamil Nadu)
- Coordinates: 8°10′57.4″N 77°26′08.6″E
- Country: India
- State: Tamil Nadu
- Elevation: 46 m (151 ft)

Languages
  - Official: Tamil, English
  - Speech: Tamil, English
- Time zone: UTC+5:30 (IST)
- PIN: 629001
- Telephone Code: +914652
- Vehicle registration: TN 74 yy xxxx
- Neighbourhoods: Nagercoil, Kottar, Vadiveeswaram, Vadasery, Edalakudy, Elankadai and Suchindram
- Corporation: Nagercoil Municipal Corporation
- LS: Kanniyakumari Lok Sabha constituency
- VS: Nagercoil Assembly constituency
- MP: Vijay Vasanth
- MLA: M. R. Gandhi

Meenakshipuram is a neighbourhood of Nagercoil, in Kanniyakumari district of Tamil Nadu state in the peninsular India. It is located at an altitude of 46 m above the mean sea level with the geographical coordinates of 8°10′57.4″N 77°26′08.6″E (i.e., 8.182611°N, 77.435708°E). Nagercoil, Kottar, Vadiveeswaram, Vadasery, Edalakudy, Elankadai and Suchindram are some of the important neighbourhoods of Meenakshipuram. Historical Clock Tower is built in Meenakshipuram. State Express Transport Corporation has a Bus depot in Meenakshipuram. There is a Bus Terminus viz., Anna Bus Stand which is situated on Cape road.

Meenakshipuram area falls under the Nagercoil Assembly constituency. The winner of the election held in the year 2021 as the member of its assembly constituency is M. R. Gandhi. Also, this area belongs to Kanniyakumari Lok Sabha constituency. Vijay Vasanth won the 2019 elections, as the member of its Lok Sabha constituency.
