= R Krishnamurthy =

Indian editor, epigraphist, and numismatist (1933–2021)

Personal details
- Born: Krishnamurthy; January 18, 1933 Nagercoil, Travancore, (present-day Kanyakumari District), India}
- Died: 4 March 2021 (aged 88) Chennai, India
- Occupation: Editor of Dinamalar, Epigraphist, Numismatist

R. Krishnamurthy (18 January 1933 – 4 March 2021) was a former editor of the Tamil daily Dinamalar and also a renowned Tamil script epigraphist and numismatist in India. The second son of Dinamalar founder, T. V. Ramasubbaiyer, he became editor of Dinamalar in 1977.

In later years, he took a keen interest in studying various Tamil inscriptions of different periods, especially the ‘Vatteluttu’ script. His interest in Tamil script epigraphy led him to numismatics. He discovered various coins of the Tamil Sangam period, which he published in a book titled ‘Sangam Age Tamil Coins’. He also published other books based on his findings and research in Tamil script epigraphy and numismatics in Tamilnadu.

Krishnamurthy founded the Tamilnadu Numismatic Society in Chennai, in 1986, and the South Indian Numismatic Society, in 1991. The Royal Numismatic Society in London honoured him by electing him a fellow of the society, in 1998. A recipient of several awards and honours, he presented his research work at several conferences in India and abroad.

== Early life ==
R. Krishnamurthy was born in Vadiveeswaram, Nagercoil, (present-day Kanyakumari District), in the then princely state of Travancore. He was the second son of freedom fighter, social activist and journalist T. V. Ramasubbaiyer, who founded the popular Tamil daily Dinamalar.

He had his schooling at Sethu Lakshmi Bai (SLB) school in Nagercoil and pre-degree education at Scott Christian College, Nagercoil. He later went on to complete his B.Sc. degree in Geology at Alagappa College (later University) in Karaikudi and Master’s degree (in the same subject) from Presidency College, Madras (now Chennai).

== Career ==
Krishnamurthy joined Dinamalar in 1956, which was then headquartered in Thiruvananthapuram. With the reorganisation of states in India, the newspaper shifted its operations to Tirunelveli (in Tamilnadu) in 1957. Eventually, the head office of the newspaper was shifted to Chennai, where he became Editor of the newspaper in 1977.

He was elected General Secretary of the India Newspaper Editors’ Conference in 1991.

== Epigraphy ==
Krishnamurthy introduced the simplified Tamil script, originally proposed by Periyar E. V. Ramasamy (Thanthai Periyar), in the Tiruchirappalli edition of his newspaper in 1977. In the course of time, several other Tamil dailies and periodicals introduced this script in their publications. In the late 1970’s, the Government of Tamilnadu adopted it in its school textbooks.

He later made studies on the origins of the Tamil language and script, especially with reference to the ‘Vatteluttu’ script. His findings and research became the basis for three books in Tamil.

== Numismatics ==
Krishnamurthy’s interest in the Tamil script and its origins later kindled his interests in Numismatics, which made him travel across the globe. He was especially interested in the coins minted by the old Tamil kingdoms of the Sangam period – the Chera, Chola and the Pandyas. He discovered various coins of the Tamil Sangam period, which he published in a book titled Sangam Age Tamil Coins. He also studied and published monographs on Roman and Greek coins found in Tamilnadu, around Karur.

Krishnamurthy founded the Tamilnadu Numismatic Society in Chennai, in 1986, and the South Indian Numismatic Society, in 1991.

== Awards and honours ==
The Royal Numismatic Society in London honoured Krishnamurthy by electing him a fellow of the society, in 1998.

In 2015, he was honoured with the Tolkappiyar award by the President of India, for his research work on Tamil.

The Numismatic Society of India awarded him the C.H. Biddulph and T. Desakachari medals.

In 2004, the Madurai Kamaraj University conferred on him the degree of Doctor of Science (Honoris Causa).
