= T. V. Ramasubbaiyer =

Indian businessman

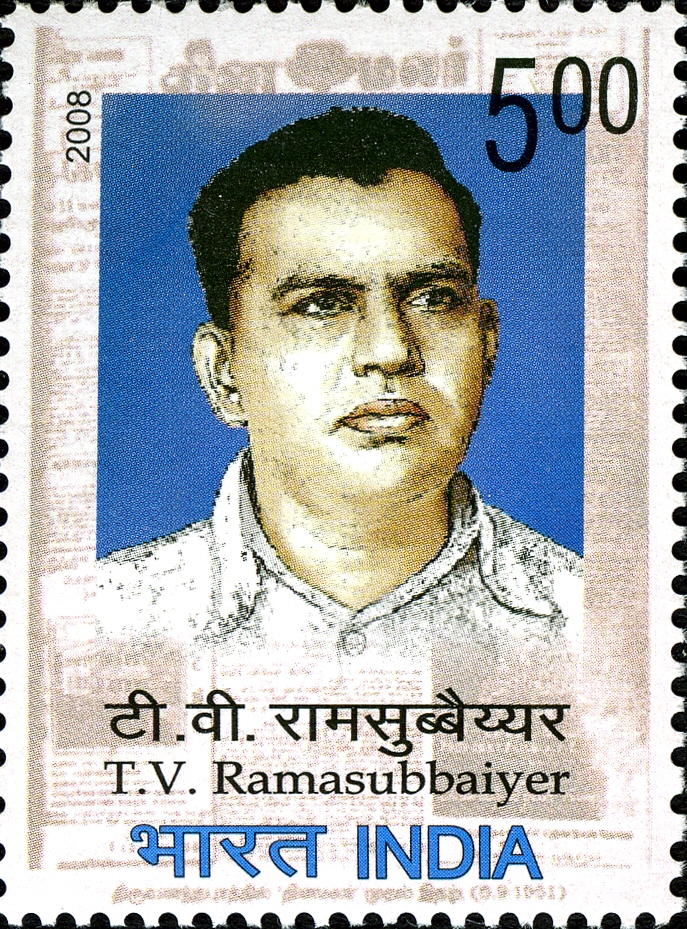
- Born: Thazhuviya Ramasubbaiyer; 2 October 1908; Thazhuvia Mahadevar Koil, Vadasery, Nagercoil, Kanyakumari District, India
- Died: 21 July 1984 (aged 75)
- Occupations: Dinamalar newspaper founder and Philanthropist
- Children: 5 sons and 2 daughters
- Parent(s): Ramalinga Iyer, Bhagavathi

Thazhuvia Ramasubbaiyer (2 October 1908 – 21 July 1984), popularly referred to as TVR, was a philanthropist and founder of the popular Tamil daily newspaper Dinamalar.

== Early life ==
Ramasubbaiyer was born to a brahmin family on 2 October 1908 at Thazhuvia Mahadevar Koil village in the then Nanjilnadu, Nagercoil, (present-day Kanyakumari District).

== Founding of Dinamalar ==
Ramasubbaiyer started a periodical Dinamalar on 6 September 1951 at Trivandrum. He later spread his operations to Tamil Nadu.

== Later years ==
TVR died on 21 July 1984.

TVR’s son, Shri R Lakshmipathy, later became the Chairman of the Press Trust of India, and another son, Late Shri R Krishnamurthy became the President of the Numismatic Society.
