= CBH =

CBH may refer to:

- CBH, the IATA code for Boudghene Ben Ali Lotfi Airport in Béchar, Algeria
- CBH-FM, a CBC Radio 2 station in Halifax, Nova Scotia
- CBH Group, grain-handling co-operative
- CBH Rechtsanwälte (Cornelius Bartenbach Haesemann)
- Cambridge Heath railway station, England; National Rail station code CBH
- Cape Breton Highlanders, a Canadian militia infantry regiment
- Catherine Booth Hospital, in Kanyakumari, Tamil Nadu, India
- Cellulase, a class of enzymes
- Chicago Blackhawks, professional ice hockey team
- Cocoa bean husk, the shell which is removed to extract the nib used to make cocoa powder and chocolate.
- Commerce Bancorp, a bank holding company
- Complete Heart Block, Third degree heart block, medical
- Cognitive Behavioural Hypnotherapy (CBH), an alternative curative healing method
- Classical Biblical Hebrew (CBH) pre-exilic Hebrew language
