= Sathavathani Sheikh Thambi Pavalar =

Indian poet

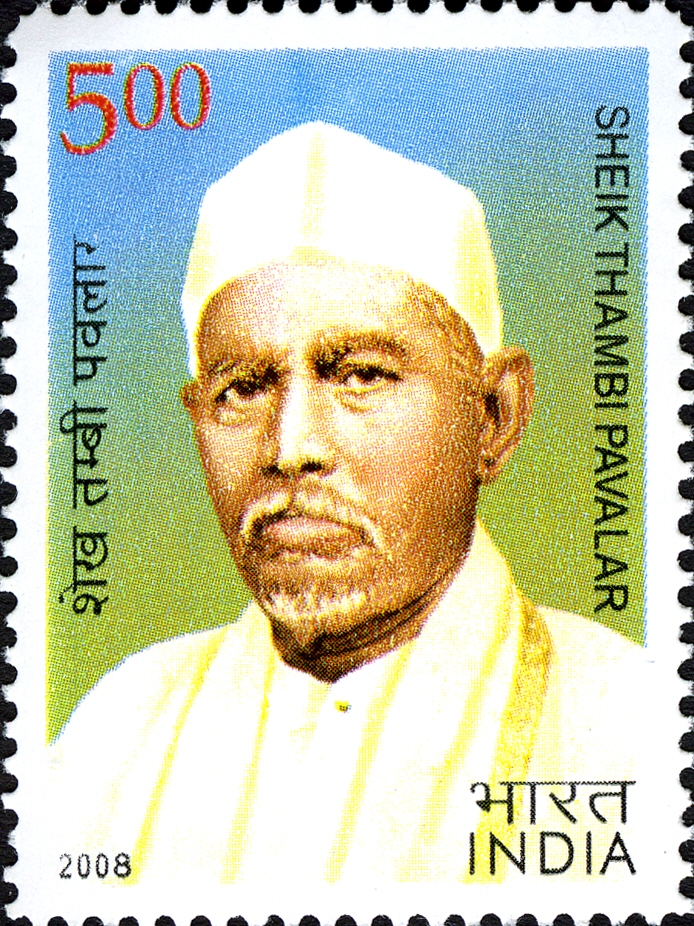
- Sheikh Thambi Pavalar on a 2008 stamp of India
- Born: 31 July 1874; Edalakudy, Nagercoil, Kanyakumari District
- Died: 13 February 1950 (aged 75)
- Other name: Sathavathani

Sheikh Thambi Pavalar (1874–1950) was a Tamil poet, scholar and an Indian independence activist.

== Early life ==
Pavalar was born on 31 July 1874 at Edalakudy in Nagercoil, Kanyakumari District, as the third son of Pakeer Meeran sahib and Ameena. He had his earlier education at Edalakudy.

Sheikh Thambi Pavalar was a good orator. He learned Arabic language in his early age and was a disciple of Sankaranarayana Pattariar, a Tamil scholar who lived at Kottar (near Edalakudy). He was well versed in 'Kamba Ramayana'.

== Literary career ==
In the year 1859, he worked as the editor of two Tamil magazines namely 'Yatharthavadhi' and 'Islamic Mithran' in Chennai. He wrote and published books – Kottatru Pillai Tamil, Alahappa Kovai, Pathirruppaththu Anthathi, Deavalogathu criminal case, Vedantha vivahara criminal case and also wrote commentaries of 'Seerapuranam', which contained 5,027 poems.

He is known as Sathavathani, which means, one who has a grasp on hundred different aspects of knowledge at a moment. On 10 March 1907 he performed Sathavathanam Programme, in the presence of scholars like V. Kalyanasundaram (Thiru. Vi. Ka) at Madras Victoria Town hall and got appreciation. He was given the title 'Mahamati Sathavathani' by Thanjai Sathavathani Subramanya Iyer. He died on 13 February 1950.

On 31 December 2008, a commemorative postage stamp on him was released.

His works are nationalized and solatium was given to his legal heirs in 2008.

== See also ==
- Avadhanam
