= Edalakudy =

- town
- Nickname: Edalai
- Country: India
- State: Tamil Nadu
- District: Kanyakumari

Languages
  - Official: Tamil
- Time zone: UTC+5:30 (IST)
- PIN: 629002
- Telephone code: 04652 2
- Vehicle registration: TN 74
- Nearest city: Nagercoil
- Lok Sabha constituency: Kanyakumari
- Vidhan Sabha constituency: Nagercoil

Edalakudy is an area approximately 3 km from Nagercoil in Kanyakumari districtin the Indian state of Tamil Nadu. It is located along the Kanyakumari highway (NH 47) and is about 17 km from the beach of Kanyakumari, 5 km from Chothavilai Beach and 10 km from Chankuthurai Beach.

== Layout ==
Edalakudy is the formal end of the Nagercoil Municipality. The main streets include Pattariar Nedum Theru (Pattariar Long Street), Puthu Theru (New Street), Kovil Theru and Nedum Theru; these streets contained the earliest settlers of the city of Nagercoil.

== Notables ==
Tamil poet and scholar Sathavathani Sheikh Thambi Pavalar was born there.

== Culture ==
Many masjids are there, including the Bawa Kassim Valiyullah Mosque.

== Governance ==
The area falls under Agastheeswaram Taluk in the district of Kanyakumari.

== Health care ==
Nearby hospitals include:

- Abdul Kadher Hospital
- Ugasewa Charitable Trust Hospital
- Sriram Orthopaedic Hospital
- Naidu Hospital

== Education ==
Few schools operate there; most of the children study in Nagercoil town.

Secondary school, Sathavathani Sheikh Thambi Pavalar Government Higher Secondary School, is built on the site of the former Edalakudy Jail, where independence activists were detained, tortured, and executed under colonial rule.
