= Nagaraja Temple, Nagercoil =

Hindu-Jain temple in India

Coordinates: 8.187617°N 77.433130°E

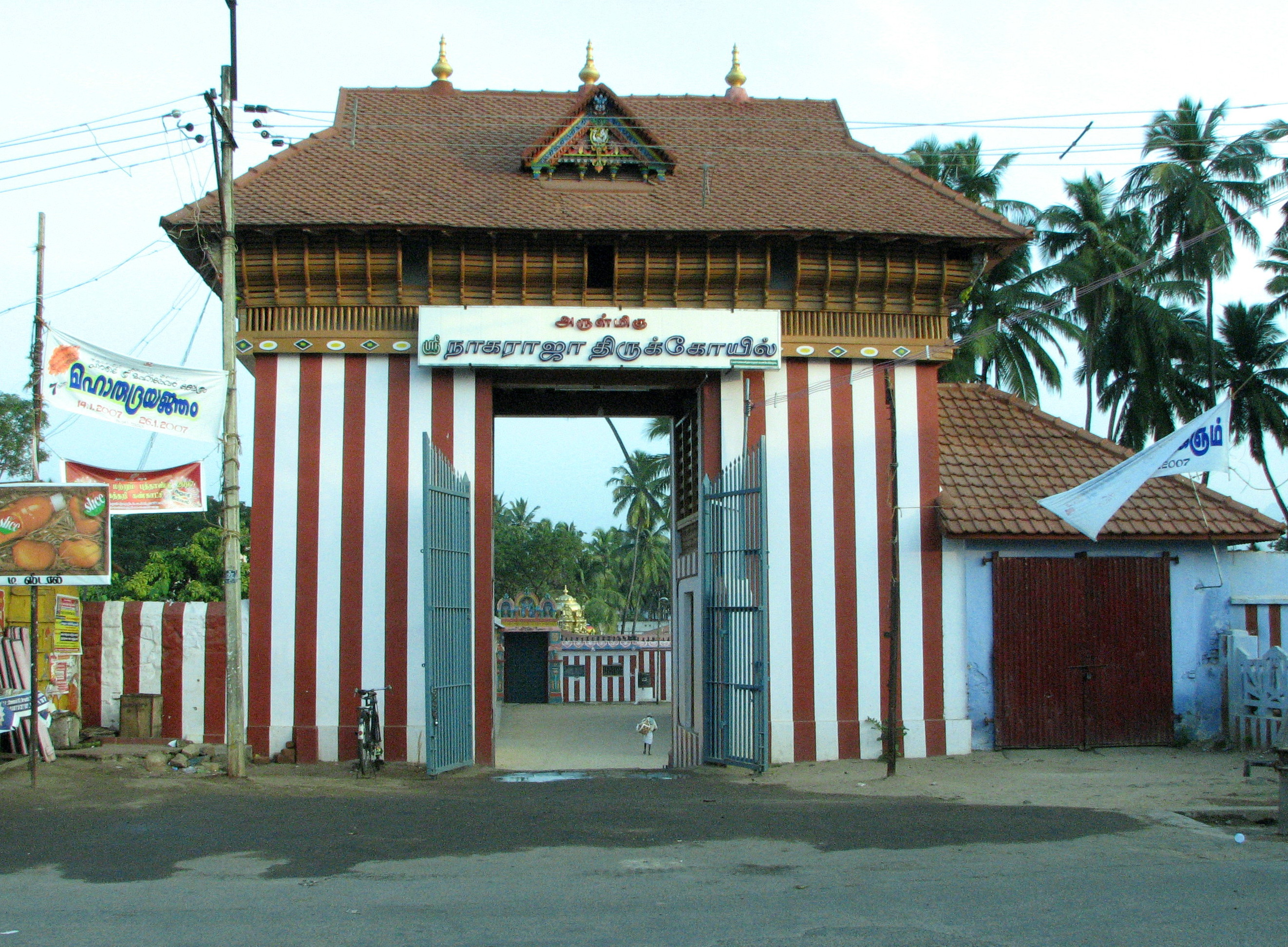
- The unusual gopura of Nagaraja temple. The city traditional name Nagarkōyil is derived from this temple.

Religion
- Affiliation: Hinduism
- District: Nagercoil
- Deity: Lord Nagaraja

Location
- Location: Nagercoil
- State: Tamil Nadu
- Country: India
- Interactive map of Nagaraja Temple, Nagercoil

Nagaraja Temple is an early large temple found in the city of Nagercoil (Nagarkōyil) near the southern tip of Tamil Nadu, India. Its dating is uncertain but likely pre-12th-century. The main sanctum is dedicated to the Nagaraja – the king of serpents. Since the 17th-century, new Hindu shrines have been added to the temple complex attracting devotees of Krishna (Vishnu), as well as Shaiva and Shakti Hindus.

The temple has three shrines. The oldest and the main shrine's deity remains the original Nagaraja. The second shrine is dedicated to Ananthakrishna (baby Krishna dancing on a coiled snake) with Rukmini and Satyabhama. The third shrine is dedicated to Shiva. The mandapa includes six icons of Jain tirthankaras and a goddess such as Parsvanatha and Padmavati Devi with rare, non-standard emblems (all lions). It also includes those of Hindu deities such as Subrahmanya Swami, Ganesha and Devi Bhagavati. The iconography of the tirthankaras and Padmavati Devi have and continue to remain a part of the sacred pantheon close to the temple's main sanctum.

== History and inscriptions ==
The temple features non-standard architecture, from its main gopuram to the sanctum which continues to feature a 5 feet high thatched sanctum and sand floor with a seated five headed Nagaraja – now inside a modern era stone cover. There is no mention in early Digambara Jain literature, nor in Hindu literature of this temple. The antiquity of the core of the main temple is thus difficult to date. The mandapam of the main and oldest shrine features Jain Tirthankara prominently and close to the sanctum, and the mandapam pillar artwork is similar to those found in temples built between the 9th-century and 12th–century temples in Tamil Nadu. The same mandapam also includes Hindu iconography. The Nagaraja (serpent-god) temple from which the town derives its name was originally a Jain shrine. There are images of Mahavira and Parsvanatha on the pillars of the mandapam; a lithic record of 1521 testifies to the fact that it was used as a Jain temple at that time.

The terminus ante quem (must exist before) evidence appears in the inscriptions found in this temple and elsewhere that refer to this temple. The earliest of these is dated in Kollam era 697 (16th-century CE), which states that Travancore king Bhutaalvira Udayamarttandavarman made donations to this temple and names priests who received the donations on behalf of this temple – these names include Gunavira Pandita and Kamalavahana Pandita, which in South Indian tradition are all Jaina names. Further, the land grant mentioned in the Ko 697 inscription calls it a pallichchandams – a term only found in grants made to a Jaina or Buddhist temple in Tamil and Tranvancore regions. This kind of epigraphical evidence, combined with Jaina iconography seen in the temple, as well as some evidence that a Jaina Basadi (Skt: Basti, neighborhood) once existed near this temple, suggests that this was originally a Jain temple or had a significant Jaina participation in the temple management and worship. However, this does not explain why there is the presence of Hindu iconography in a Jain temple or the unusual aspects of Jaina iconography. (Note: Nagaraja and the serpent hood icon is common in historic monuments of Jainism, Hinduism and Buddhism throughout South and Southeast Asia.)

=== Iconography ===
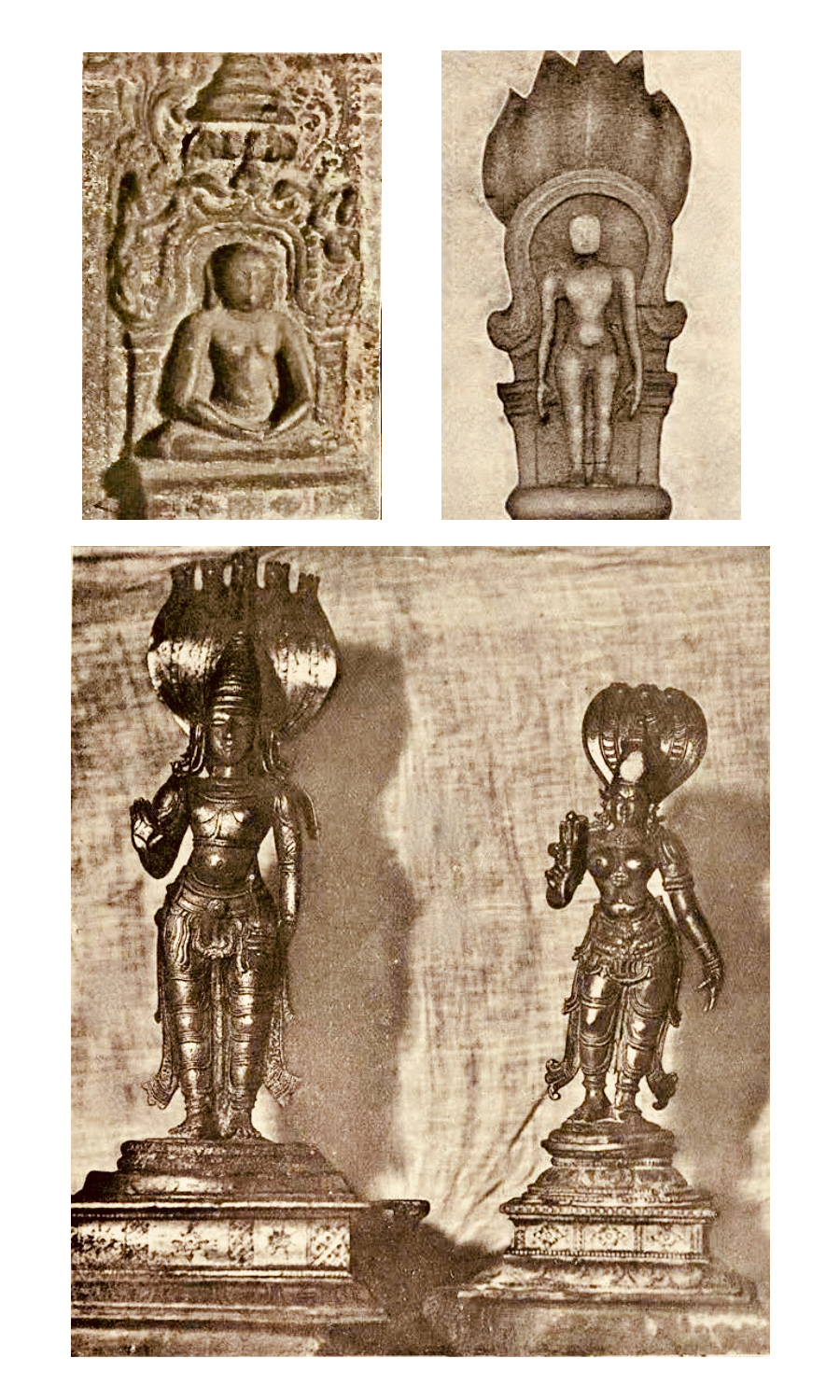
Early artwork found at the Nagaraja temple. The top two are distinctly Jaina. The lower can be either Jain or Hindu.

The temple's Jaina iconography is unusual. It consists of six major and clearly Jaina revered figures, but not all Tirthankaras. These include three images of seated Mahavira, one of standing Parsvanatha, one additional sitting Parsvanatha, and sixth of Padmavati Devi. One of the Mahavira images is in front of the main sanctum. The remaining five are dispersed in the mandapam, yet in prominent locations for the devotee walking to the sanctum. Parsvanatha's iconography includes the standard Jaina representation: a fanned Naga guarding over his head. All six are on the simhasana. The unusual aspect of the iconography is that instead of their regular and distinctive emblems below their asanas, all six have lion emblems below them. Further, the srivatsa mark near the nipple of Tirthankara iconography typically found in early Jaina temples, is not found in this temple. These unusual aspects suggest that the temple may have been built before these guidelines for Jaina iconography developed, or Jains did not build this temple. The proportions and style of the Jaina reliefs match those suggested by Manasara – a Hindu text on architecture and design with a dedicated chapter on Jaina and Buddhist arts. This suggests that the artisans may have been Hindu, or that the iconography followed the art literature prevalent when this temple's mandapam was constructed.

The temple has two pre-14th century brass images, one male and another female, both in abhaya mudra. The male has a five head Naga over his head, the female has three headed one. The lower body of both are shown wearing clothes draped in the Tamil style. Both have ear and body jewelry. The female is standing in the tribhanga holding a flower in her left hand. According to T.A. Gopinatha Rao – an Art historian and epigraphist known for his books on iconography in Hindu, Jain and Buddhist temples, such historic brass images are found in both traditions, and "there is nothing peculiarly Hindu in them, they may as well be Jaina as Hindu deities."

The large mandapa in front of the main garbhagriya (sanctum) in this temple has many pillars. On these are found many reliefs. Most of these are Hindu deities and icons. Some are related to Jainism. For example, Mahavira, Parsvanatha and Padmavati Devi are all included, with the standing figures shown sheltered with five-hooded cobra. This diversity was included during the temple's design and construction. According to Stella Kramrisch and other scholars, Jain iconography is found to co-exist with Hindu iconography in this and other temples built in the Travancore region of South India.

According to archaeologist A.S. Ramanatha Ayyar, this temple was originally a "Jaina place of worship dedicated to Parsvanatha". It was gradually "Hinduized or simply mistaken as a temple of Adisesha by the local Hindus" since Jaina and Hindu iconography are similar. Ayyar states that a Kollam 336 (12th-century CE) inscription found in Puravaseri village of Travancore indicated that a land gift to the Jainas was being partly used for another Vishnu temple, which suggests that this overlap between the two traditions is confirmed by this inscription. According to Deivanayagam, this temple originated and operated as a Jain palli dedicated to Nagaraja and Parswanatha. However as the Jain population dwindled and Jainism faded away during the political turmoil in late 16th-century South India, it was taken over by the Hindu bhakti tradition as confirmed by the above Jain reliefs and inscriptions found in the temple.

According to historian S. Padmanabham, the best explanation for this co-existence of early Jaina and Hindu iconography within the same temple is not conflict, but of "religious integration" cherished by the Tamil culture, something seen in other Hindu and Jain monuments. The three sanctums are dedicated to Jaina, Vaishnava and Shaiva deities, which cannot be explained as conversion of Jaina temple by some Hindu tradition, either Vaishnava or Shaiva, since the victor would normally emphasize their specific Vishnu or Shiva tradition. Padmanabham further states that the temple's gopura is also unusual for a Jain or Hindu temples, and it "reminds us of the Buddhist architecture". This temple is a "symbol of fusion", according to Padmanabham.

=== Inscriptions ===
Nine inscriptions have been found in the Nagaraja temple. Eight of these are on slabs within the main temple, while the ninth is from Kollam 764 (c. 1590 CE) on the west wall of the Krishna shrine. Six of the eight inside the main shrine are dated between Ko 681 and 697 (first quarter of the 16th-century), and they all record gifts of offerings to Nagaraja and other deities in the temple through priests with Jaina-type names. Thus the early inscriptions available confirm Jain roots of the temple, states Ayyar. The name Gunavira-Pandita mentioned in these early inscriptions may be the same as the Jaina author of the same name credited with devotional verses to Jain Tirthankara Neminatha and some late grammatical works. However, there is no evidence to establish that the priest mentioned in Nagaraja temple inscriptions and the Jaina author were the same person. These Jaina inscriptions mention the offering of rice to the serpent god, to other images, flower garlands, oil to anoint the images, morning service, night service, and dakshinai on Sundays of the Tamil month of Tai. One of these inscriptions dated Ko 694, mention a gift of land of Seravanmadevi village as pallichchandam.

It is the inscription of Ko year 764 that lacks any Jaina names, instead mentions that a certain Tirukkurukaipperumal (a Vaishnava name) made an offering to the temple of Tiruvanantalvar (Adisesha) and to an "image he set up there". This is the first epigraphical indication of temple being expanded with an additional image along with the Krishna shrine, in terms that are associated with Vaishnavism.

=== Legend ===
Aithihyamala, a collection of myths and legends from around Kerala has one story that mentions the origin of the temple. A Nambudiri Brahmin from the Paambummaekkaattu Mana near Mala, Kerala in modern day Thrissur district rediscovered a Naga idol on the way back from his visit to a Pandyan King in Tamil Nadu and re-initiated worship. Originally planning to build a temple dedicated to the so found Naga, the decision was later changed, due to a divine vision in the form of a dream, instead to install Vishnu and Shiva as main deities to the temple and left the Naga idol in its original place.

== Contemporary temple ==
The temple is located in the city of Nagercoil, about 20 kilometers northwest of Kanyakumari. It has three shrines. The oldest and the main shrine's deity remains the original five headed Nagaraja. The second shrine is dedicated to Ananthakrishna (baby Krishna dancing on a coiled snake) with Rukmini and Satyabhama. The third shrine is dedicated to Shiva.

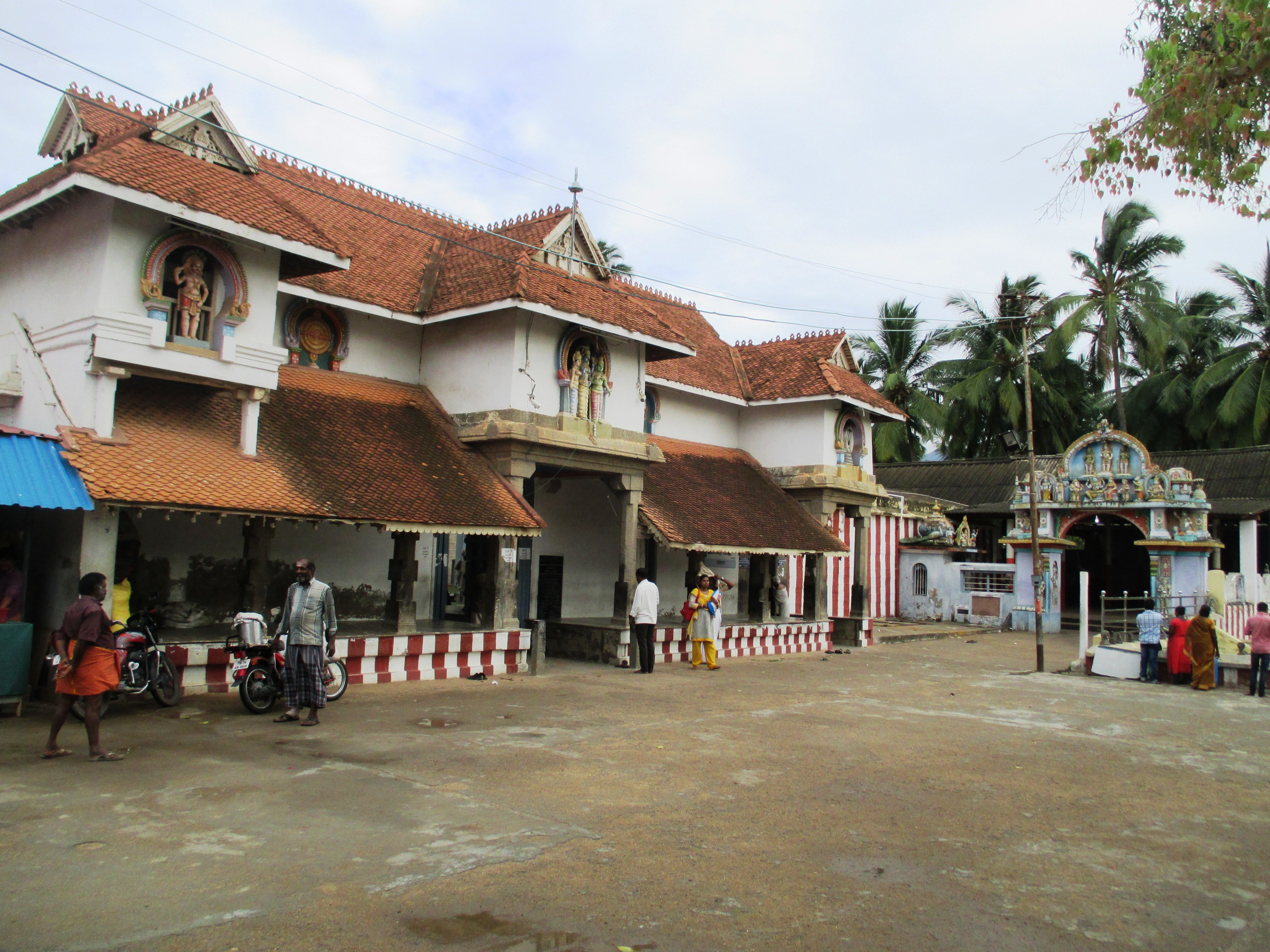
The Krishna shrine

The temple has an attached water tank and open prakara (circumambulation path) along which are numerous stone motifs of Naga. The primary and main shrine dedicated to Nagaraja has a mandapa with sixteen pillars, each with four faces. Of the sixty four pillar faces, six are dedicated images of Jain Tirthankaras and Jain goddess Padmavati Devi. The other fifty eight faces have Hindu gods and goddesses, with some iconography that is found in both Jain and Hindu temples. Both the Jain and Hindu icons continue to be treated with reverence by the local population. The sanctum of the minor shrines are dedicated to two major traditions within Hinduism – one to Vaishnavism and other to Shaivism.

The sanctum of the main shrine currently continues to preserve the original structure. It consists of a sandy floor, a mud walled room with a low height thatched roof. The visiting devotees are offered a small portion of the scooped sand from the floor of the sanctum. The entire mud wall-thatched roof is contained within a more modern stone structure that can be traced from outside. The thatched roof is restored and the sand in the sandy floor is replenished with fresh clean river sand during the annual chariot festival every year.

=== Festivals ===
The temple's main festival is the annual Brahmotsavam in the Tamil month of Tai (January–February). It is observed over ten days starting with the day of the Revathi and ending on the Ayillyam. It is a chariot festival, where a procession leaves the temple with different statues and icons of gods and goddesses housed within the different shrines, on certain mornings or evenings or both, based on the historic tradition. Ganesha is taken out in the front of every procession, on his Mosshika vahnam everyday except the ninth day when he also is carried in the chariot. On the last day, all the deities including Lord Nagaraja is taken in the festive procession to the nearby river for a holy bath in a big palanquin. During this festival, a white flag is hosted at the Dhvaja Stambha where there is tortoise found with the Stambha. This tortoise icon is Kurma in Hindu iconography and is a common symbolism found in Hindu Vaishnava temples with stambha and bali pitha. A similar tortoise icon is also found in Jainism.

== Gallery ==
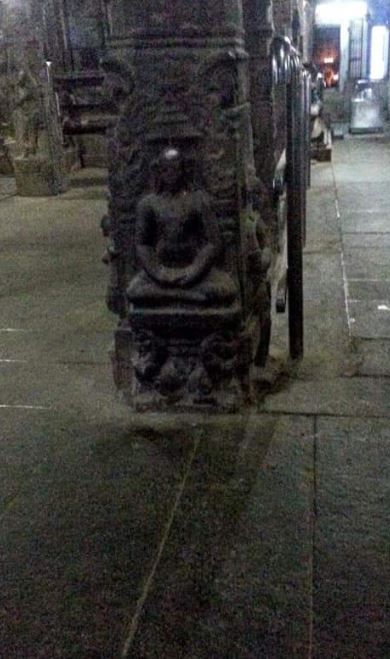
Jain Tirthankaras, Mahavira

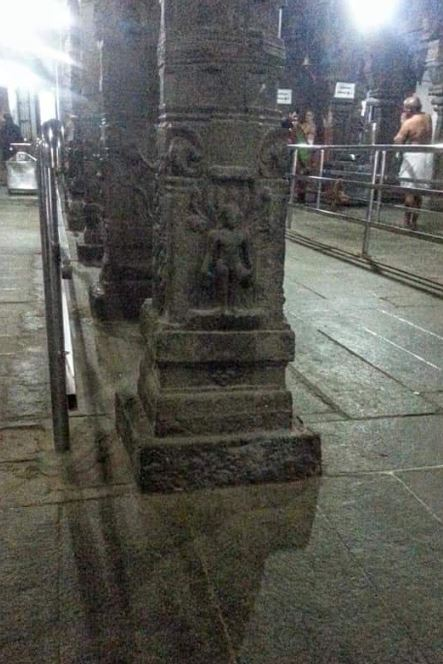
Parshvanatha Image

== See also ==
- Mannarasala Temple
- Padmanabhaswamy Temple
- Aithihyamala
