= Bawa Kassim Valiyullah Mosque =

Mosque in Kanyakumari, Tamil Nadu, India

- Location of the mosque in Tamil Nadu

Religion
- Affiliation: Islam
- Ecclesiastical or organizational status: Mosque
- Status: Active

Location
- Location: Elankadai, Kanyakumari, Tamil Nadu
- Country: India
- Interactive map of Bawa Kassim Valiyullah Mosque
- Coordinates: 8°09′50″N 77°26′42″E

Architecture
- Type: Mosque architecture

Specifications
- Dome: Four (maybe more)
- Minaret: 20 (maybe more)

The Bawa Kassim Valiyullah Mosque, also known as the Bava Kassim Waliyullah Masjid, is a mosque, located in the village of Elankadai, near the town of Nagercoil, in the Kanyakumari district of the state of Tamil Nadu, India. The name was derived from Bawa Kasssim Valiyullah who migrated from Saudi Arabia to the Kanyakumari district in the 16th century CE.

== See also ==
- Islam in India
- List of mosques in India
