= Elankadai =

Neighbourhood in Kanyakumari district, Tamil Nadu, India

- town
- Country: India
- State: Tamil Nadu
- District: Kanyakumari

Languages
  - Official: Tamil
- Time zone: UTC+5:30 (IST)
- PIN: 629002
- Telephone code: 04652 2
- Vehicle registration: TN 74
- Nearest city: Nagercoil
- Lok Sabha constituency: Kanyakumari
- Vidhan Sabha constituency: Nagercoil

Elankadai is a village about 3 km from the Nagercoil town in Kanyakumari district, Tamil Nadu, India. It is located on the KanyaKumari State way via Manakkudy and about 18 km from the beach of Kanyakumari, 5 km from Chothavilai Beach and 10 km from Chankuthurai Beach. People following major Indian religion live in this area.

== Buildings ==
The religious buildings in Elankadai are the Bawa Kassim Valiyullah Mosque, St. Antony's Church, Esakki Amman Temple, Masjid-ul-Anwar, Masjid-ul-Ashraf, and Masjidul Salaamath.

There are only a few schools in this area; though most of the children study in well known schools in Nagercoil town. Elankadai Government Middle School is one of the oldest schools in nagercoil and is situation on NH47. There is also Hannan Nursery School and Sathavathani Sheikh Thambi Pavalar Government Higher secondary school.

The nearby hospitals are Abdul Kadir Hospital and Uga Sewa Hospital.
