= Smith of Derby Group =

British clockmaker

- Type: Public company
- Founded: 1856; 170 years ago
- Headquarters: Derby
- Products: clocks
- Website: www.smithofderby.com

Smith of Derby Group is a clockmaker based in Derby, England founded in 1856. Smith of Derby has been operated continuously under five generations of the Smith family.

== History ==
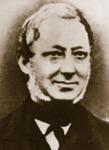
John Smith (1813–1886), clockmaker and the original founder of today's Smith of Derby Group

John Smith (21 December 1813 – 1886) became an apprentice to John Whitehurst in 1827. He went on to be the founder of a new clockmaking company in 1856, first establishing his business in premises at 27 Queen Street in Derby.

John Smith's new company flourished during the Industrial Revolution. When he died in 1886, his two sons, Frank and John took over the running of the family business. Under Frank Smith, the company were responsible for building the huge turret clock for St Paul's Cathedral in 1893.

Frank Smith died in 1913, and the company was run by staff until his son Alan was old enough to take over the running of the business. Alan Smith was succeeded by Howard Smith, who in turn, was succeeded by Nicholas Smith.

During the 20th century, Smith and Sons expanded through the acquisition of a variety of businesses. Clockmakers William Potts & Sons, Leeds were established in 1833 and acquired by Smith of Derby in 1933; JB Joyce & Co of Whitchurch were responsible for many clocks internationally and were acquired by Smith of Derby in 1965; George & Francis Cope were established in 1845 as producers of chronometers for the Admiralty, and joined Smith of Derby in 1984. In 1985 they acquired B & H (Derby) Ltd and became the current Smith of Derby Group.

In 2013, the company acquired the historical Scottish clockmaker James Ritchie & Son but continue to operate the firm as a subsidiary.

== Public clock installations in Europe ==
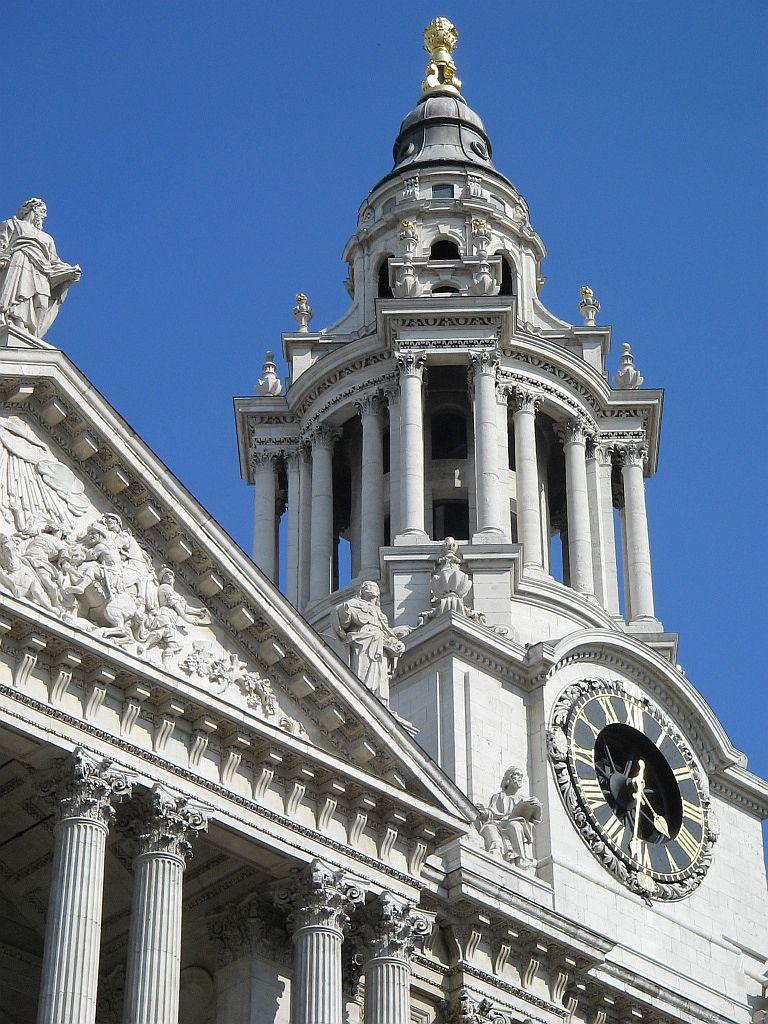
The Cathedral Clock originally manufactured and installed by John Smith and Sons in 1893 at St Paul's Cathedral in London

- Memorial Clock, Willenhall, 1892
- Cathedral Clock at St Paul's Cathedral, London 1893
- Town Hall clock in Grampound, Cornwall 1894
- Glossop Town Hall, located in Derbyshire

The Jubilee Clock Tower, located in Sunbury, Midd'x. 1897.

- The Jubilee Clock Tower, located in Maidenhead 1897
- Magheralin Co, Down Church Of Ireland Clock 1901
- Trinity College Clock, Cambridge 1910
- Cathedral Quarter Hotel Clock in Derby
- Temple Court time feature at Minories Shopping Centre, Birmingham
- Grand Brasserie Clock at St Pancras station, London
- Hourglass Clock at Burghley House near Stamford
- Planisphere at Bluewater Shopping Centre, Kent
- Light Clock at Royal Derby Hospital, Derby
- Restoration of original medieval Salisbury Cathedral clock in Salisbury
- Restoration of the Blair Castle Clock Tower destroyed by fire in Blair Atholl, Perthshire
- Portsmouth Guildhall Bell Tower restoration, Portsmouth
- "H. Samuel" clock (1963) hanging outside Cardiff Market, High Street, Cardiff.
- Pierhead Clock (1897) restored and reinstalled by Smith of Derby in 2011 as public art in St Mary Street, Cardiff
- The DNA Clock (2011), located in the foyer of Redcar Hospital

== Public clock installations in Asia ==
- Nagercoil Clock Tower, Nagercoil, India
- DNA Clock at King Faisal University, Dammam, Saudi Arabia
- Tower Clock at Sultan Qaboos Grand Mosque, Muscat, Oman
- 16 operational clocks in Mecca/Makkah, Holy Haram, Saudi Arabia
- Town Clock at Dammam, Saudi Arabia
- Seif Palace, Kuwait City, Kuwait
- Al-Mustansiriya University, Baghdad, Iraq
- Beach Rotana Hotel, Abu Dhabi, United Arab Emirates
- Central Bank of Oman, Muscat, Oman
- Souq Square, Nizwa, Oman
- Duthie's Clock Tower, Nagercoil
- Ismaili Centre (JamatKhana), Hyderabad, Pakistan

== Record-holding clocks ==
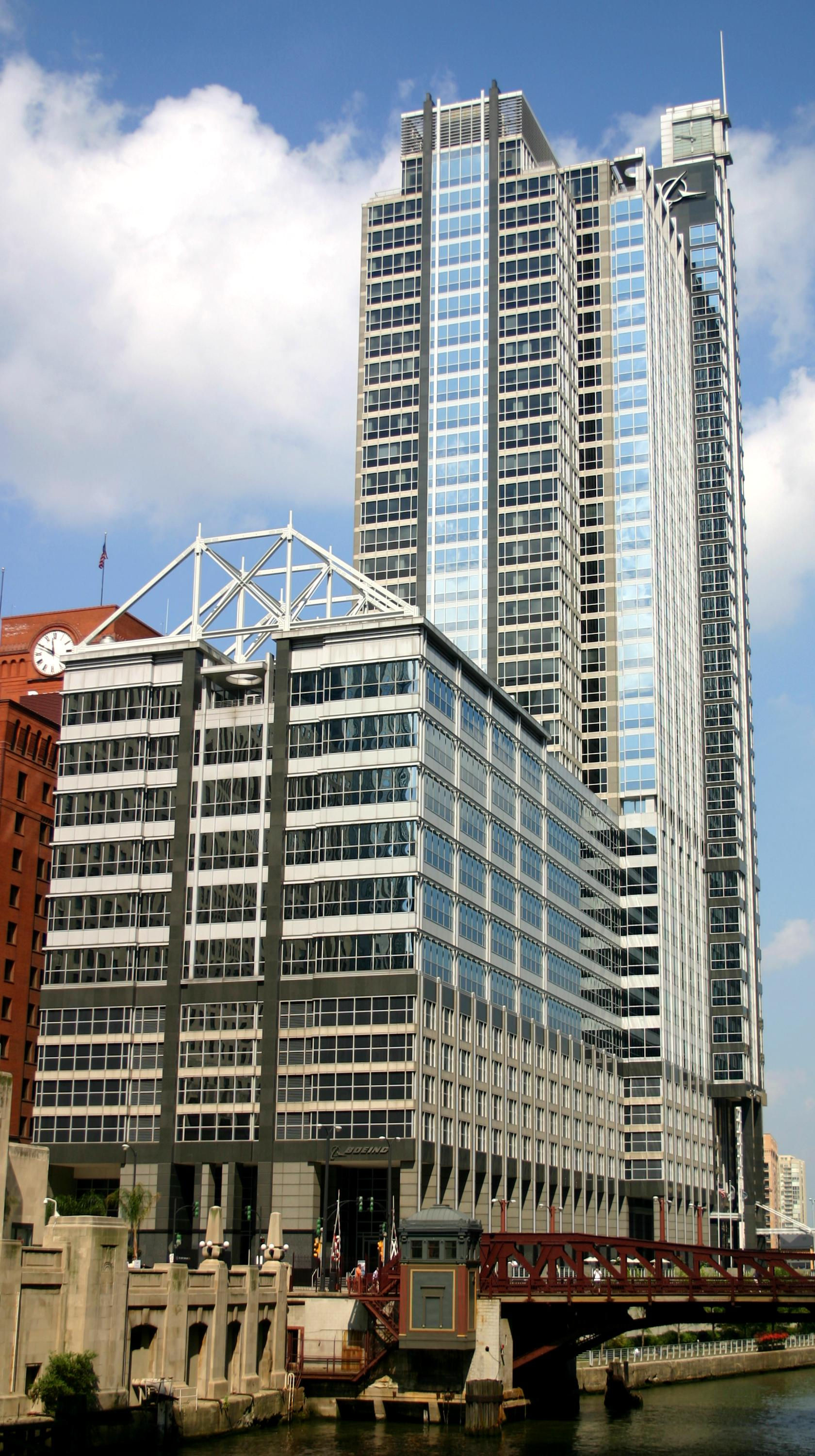
The world's highest building mounted clock above street level at the Boeing Headquarters in Chicago, by Smith of Derby. Photographer J. Crocker

- Guinness World Records: The world's largest pendulum-regulated clock is the Harmony Tower in Ganzhou, China.
- Guinness World Records: The world's largest steam clock is on the North Quay at St Helier, Jersey.
- The world's largest solar-powered clock is called 'The Beacon' and is installed as a feature clock at the University of Baghdad.
- The world's largest inclined clock is at Time Square in Al-Ain, UAE.
- The world's highest building mounted clock above street level is 170 metres above street level and is mounted on top of Boeing's Headquarters in Chicago.
- The world's largest mechanical tower clock is also the Harmony Tower in Ganzhou, China.
- The world's most remote public clock is owned by the Queen of Tonga.

In addition to these clock installations, Smith of Derby also manufactures some of the world's most expensive Islamic Prayer Clocks. The Prayer Clocks are customisable and can be designed to include precious metals and gems.

== Other notable projects ==
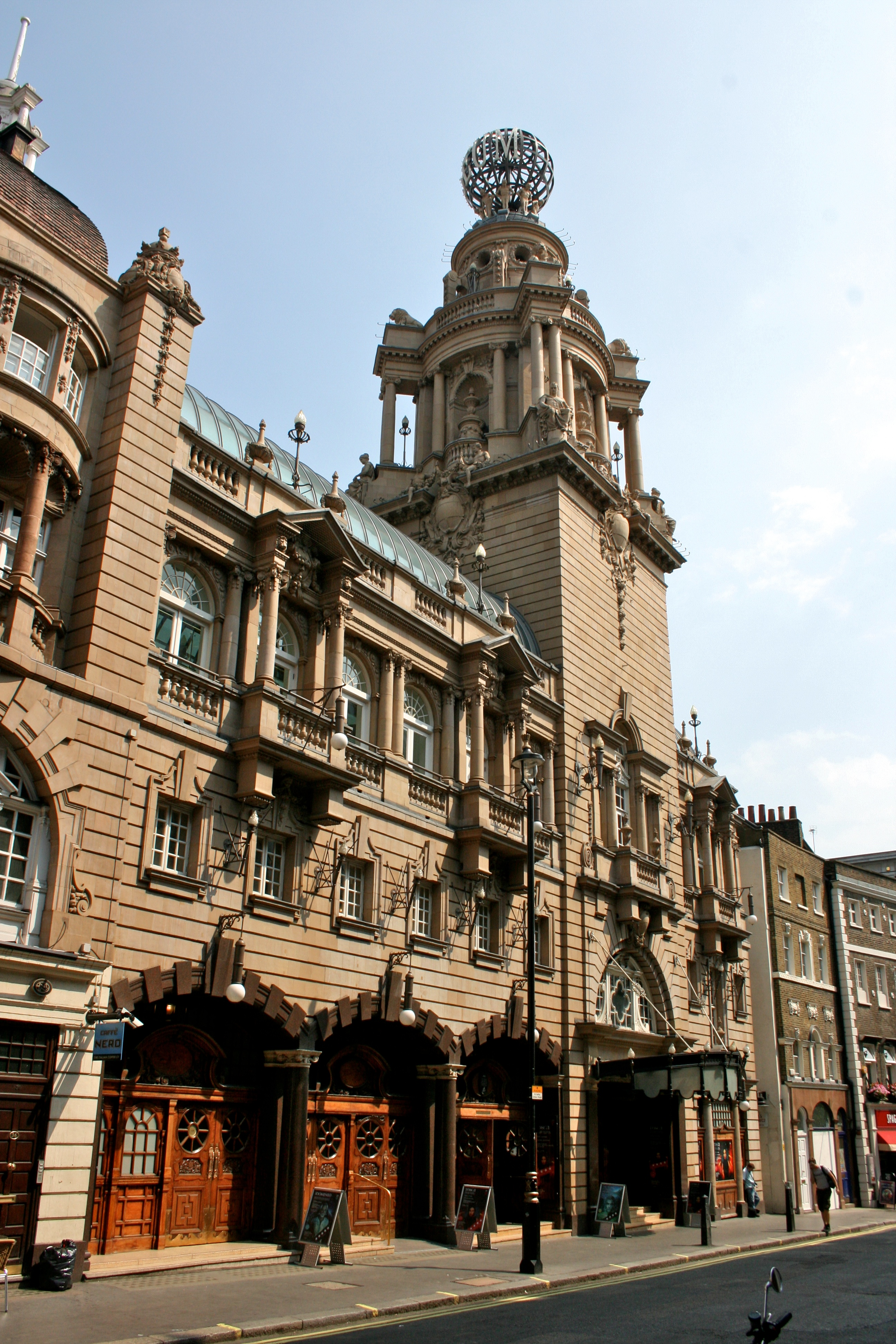
The rotating globe kinetic sculptural installation at the Coliseum Theatre in London manufactured by Smith of Derby

- Foucault Pendulum in the Donnan and Robinson Laboratory at University of Liverpool
- Rotating steel globe on the Coliseum Theatre, London
- One Revolution Per Day pendulum sculpture in Davos, Switzerland
- Eleanor Cross in Stamford, Lincolnshire
- Zoetrope in Billinghay, Lincolnshire
- Clock mechanism in Herne Bay Clock Tower replaced by the company with synchronous electric hour striking unit in 1971.
