= Catherine Booth Hospital =

Hospital in India

Coordinates: 8.199955°N 77.430506°E

The Salvation Army Catherine Booth Hospital (CBH) is a hospital and nursing school run by the Salvation Army in Nagercoil, Kanyakumari, Tamil Nadu, India.

It is named after Catherine Booth, the wife of William Booth, the founder of the Salvation Army. This hospital was started by Capt. Henry John (Harry) Andrews, in the year of 1893. After he called by father of the medical work in the worldwide salvation army.

This mission hospital is situated at Vadasery, Nagercoil, which is 18 km away from Kanyakumari. It was started in 1893 when missionary Harry Andrews treated the first patient in a tiny bath room. Since then it has grown into a 300-bed general hospital with departments of medicine, surgery, obstetrics, gynecology, pediatrics, orthopaedics, ophthalmology, and otorhinolaryngology. During the year 1900 the new building was inaugurated.

== School of nursing ==
The school of nursing was added in 1938.
