= Dinamalar =

Indian Tamil daily newspaper

- Type: Daily Newspaper
- Format: Broadsheet
- Founder: T. V. Ramasubbaiyer
- Founded: 6 September 1951
- Language: Tamil
- Headquarters: Chennai, India
- Circulation: 693,742 (as of April 2023)
- Website: dinamalar.com

Dinamalar is an Indian Tamil daily newspaper. It was founded in 1951 by T. V. Ramasubba Iyer. Dinamalar has an average circulation of 689,773 (ABC Jan–Jun 2022).

== History ==
Dinamalar was founded by T. V. Ramasubbaiyer on 6 September 1951 at Thiruvananthapuram. The operations were moved to Tirunelveli in 1957.

== Circulation ==
The newspaper is printed in 10 cities in Tamil Nadu namely Chennai, Coimbatore, Erode, Madurai, Nagercoil, Pondicherry, Salem, Tiruchirappalli, Tirunelveli, Vellore and Bangalore. As of Jun 2022, the newspaper has a circulation of 1,731,8959 and more than 2 million epaper subscribers.

== Content ==
The investigative journal Cobrapost released an undercover investigation and video which exposed the executives of Dinamalar speaking of promoting Hindutva and promoting the agenda of Rashtriya Swayamsevak Sangh (RSS) and the Bharatiya Janata Party (BJP) in 2018. Cobrapost reported that the Director Lakshmipathy Adimoolam was devoted to the ideology of the RSS. In the operation, Adimoolam went on to say that his family's loyalty to the RSS and the BJP has harmed their business a lot. Director Adimoolam also mentioned "We have a lot of same wavelength with the BJP family is around."

Dinamalar in July 2021 published misleading news claiming that Tamil Nadu's western area was going to be made into a separate union territory called Kongu Nadu.

== Controversies ==
On 8 September 2008, Dinamalar's supplementary edition Computer malar carried a cartoon of the Islamic prophet, Muhammad which led to protest from Islamic groups.

On 22 April 2019, Dinamalar received a backlash after its headline on the 2019 Sri Lanka Easter bombings report was seen to be mocking Christians and Jesus. The report titled "O...Sesappa" which meant Oh...Jesus in a mocking tone was seen offensive by many. Dinamalar Office asked for police protection following the incident. Many readers on social media objected the heading. Following this, Dinamalar published an explanation and expressed its regret.

In January 2019, Dinamalar posted a body-shaming cartoon of the BJP's Tamil Nadu President Tamilisai Soundararajan. The cartoon depicted the BJP leader playing ring toss, makes her look wantonly disheveled. Soundarajan slammed the cartoon and said "Those with a basic lack of respect for women are capable of opining in this manner."

Dinamalar called the Chief Minister of Tamil Nadu as "Palani" instead of "Palaniswamy" in July 2020. The incident caused a controversy. A protest was held in Coimbatore today on behalf of the Social Justice People's Party and at the end of the protest the Dinamalar newspapers were set on fire.

== Legal cases ==
In October 2009, Dinamalar published an article claiming that several Tamil film actresses were involved in prostitution along with pictures and names. The South Indian Film Artistes' Association petitioned to have the senior sub editor arrested and staged a rally condemning the same. The rally was led by Rajinikanth with other actors including Vijayakanth, Sarath Kumar and Suriya. The senior sub editor of the newspaper, Lenin was arrested under Section 4 of the Tamil Nadu Prevention of Women Harassment Act and was sent to judicial custody. He was released on the next day on protests from Chennai Press Club, Madras Union of Journalists, Press Trust of India and the Indian Newspaper Society. Dinamalar stated that the news was obtained from ethical sources and there was no secondary agenda.

In February 2012, Vanniyar Sangam leader and Member of Legislative Assembly, Kaduvetti Guru lodged a complaint to Police Commissioner seeking the arrest of Dinamalar editor Krishnamurthy and its publisher Lakshmipathy for publishing news insulting the Vanniyar caste and trying to create caste violence. The article published by Dinamalar read, "Vanniyars do not interact and keep their distance with other castes. Vanniyars been involved in anti-social activities due to poverty and even though they have show elevated status in society, they are widely known for their violence and oppressive behavior. Due to this, other castes follow an unwritten rule to not do business with Vanniyars. Due to this, Vanniyars are introducing themselves in the community as Gounder in order to avoid professional harm." Pattali Makkal Katchi's leader G. K. Mani asked why Dinamalar hates Vanniyars so much and also said that the newspaper had constantly defamed the Vanniyars.

In September 2019, A Judicial Magistrate in Krishnagiri sentenced the Editor and the Publisher of Tamil daily Dinamalar to two years' imprisonment in a defamation case filed by a police inspector. The Judicial Magistrate passed the order on a private complaint lodged by an inspector, who was posted in Krishnagiri in 2005. The complainant said in a column "Tea Kadai Bench", published in the daily, it was alleged that he received kickbacks from those trading in illicit liquor that was transported from Bengaluru into Tamil Nadu via Hosur. Besides, the report alleged that he had acquired properties through illegal means. Though he had sent a legal notice to the daily seeking damages of ₹10 lakh, the publication did not respond to it. The lawyers representing the editor and the publisher had argued that it was the duty of the media to hold those in positions accountable. However, the magistrate held that the article was not backed with evidence and lent to "gossip mongering". The court said the write-up, that had not named the complainant in the allegations, however, ended up directly naming him as a conversational tool.
