= Nagercoil Clock Tower =

Building in Nagercoil, India

Clock Tower
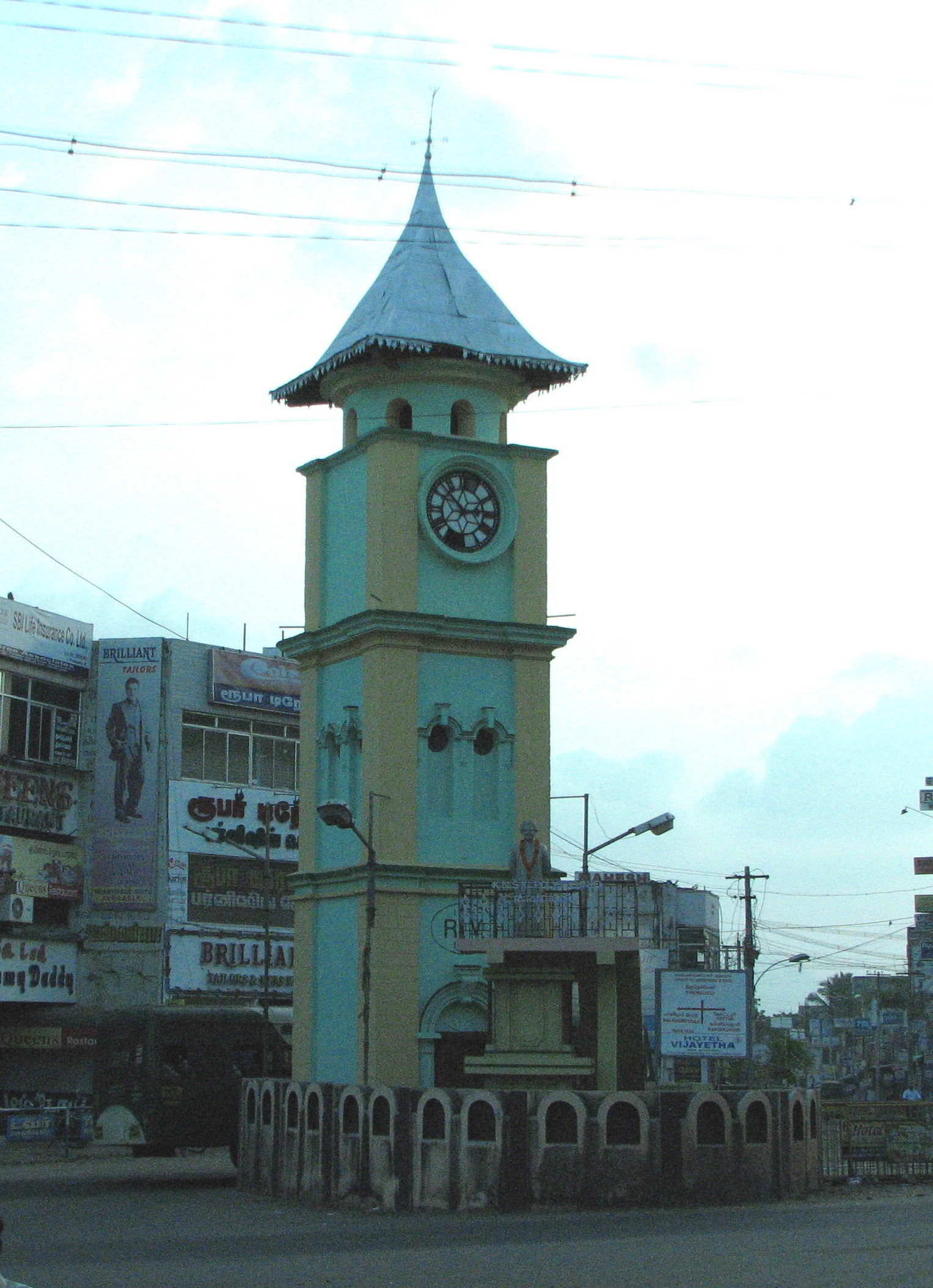
- Interactive map of the Clock Tower area

General information
- Type: Clock tower
- Architectural style: Indo-Saracenic architecture
- Location: Nagercoil, India
- Coordinates: 8°10′57.4″N 77°26′08.6″E
- Completed: 1893

Height
- Height: 31 m (102 ft)

Design and construction
- Architects: Hogeorf and S. Horesly, Stroud, Gloucestershire England
- Other designers: Rev. James Duthie

The Nagercoil Clock Tower, also known as Nagercoil Tower Junction, is situated in the heart of the city of Nagercoil, India. The clock in the tower was presented to the Maharajah of Travancore by the European missionary, Rev. Duthie, during his visit to Nagercoil in the later part of the 19th century. A prominent landmark of Nagercoil, it is in a state of neglect. It has stopped ticking as there is no expert available to bring it back to action.

== History ==
The clock tower was built at the centre place of Nagercoil, to commemorate the visit of Sri Moolam Thirunal, then ruler of Travancore, in 1893, and it was designed by Hogeorf and S. Horesly of England. The Maharajah himself inaugurated it on 15 February 1893. The pendulum of the clock was made in Derbyshire by Smith of Derby Group, London. The clock is attached to a 60-foot-long chain with a weight, operated with pulleys through gravitational force. As the Nagercoil Municipality grew wary repairing the clock every time it stood still, the clock tower is now legally under private care as per a contract with the Nagercoil Municipality since 2009. The sponsor renovated the tower twice in 2010 and 2012 by spending around Rs. 4 lakh. It has been running without trouble ever since.
