= Vadiveeswaram =

- Village
- Location in Tamil Nadu, India
- Coordinates: 8°10′46″N 77°26′20″E
- Country: India
- State: Tamil Nadu
- District: Kanniyakumari
- Elevation: 15 m (49 ft)

Languages
  - Official: Tamil
- Time zone: UTC+5:30 (IST)
- PIN: 629002
- Telephone code: 04652
- Vehicle registration: TN 74

Vadiveeswaram is a village, now part of the town of Nagercoil, in Kanyakumari district in the southern Indian state of Tamil Nadu. The village was originally an agraharam, or a traditional double line of houses occupied by Brahmins and flanking a temple or pair of temples. It is most famous as the birthplace of Neelakanta Sivan, a well-known 19th-century composer.

== Geography ==
Vadiveeswaram (வடிவீசுவரம் )is located at 8°10′46″N 77°26′20″E, on the Pazhayar river (பழையாறு). Among the prominent streets in Vadiveeswaram are Deep Street (Palla Theru), Kezha palla theru, Big Street(Periya Theru)பெரிய தெரு, Dalavai ( தளவாய் ) Street, High Street (Mettu Theru)மேட்டுத்தெரு, East Car Street (Kizhakku Radha Veedhi), West Car Street (Merku Radha Veedhi), Sasthankoil Street and Kalmada street, Kazhvettankuzhi Street.

In 2001, according to the Census of India, Vadiveeswaram had a population of 5,254 people, with 81 per cent literacy.

The low-lying area is prone to flooding during heavy rains.

Nagercoil Railway Station is the nearest railway station which is about a 5 minutes walk from the centre (prominent streets).

It has the Cape road as the western border, Meenakshipuram at north, Kottar (Kambolam) at south and Railway station with paddy fields as the eastern borders.

== History ==
The name Vadiveeswaram is a compound of the words vadivu, which means 'beauty' and Eeswara, an appellation of the God Shiva, in Tamil. The name thus means the beauty of Shiva, which could refer either to the area or to the presiding goddess of the Azhagamman Temple, a Hindu Saivite temple situated in the north-east corner of the village.

Carnatic composer Neelakanta Sivan was born in Vadiveeswaram in 1839. He mentioned his birthplace twice in his work Thiruneelakanta Botham. A festival of Carnatic music was held in the village in 2007.

== Political ==
Its under Kannya kumari district - 30 மாவட்டம், Nagercoil - 230 constituency தொகுதி,

part numbers 129–133 in electoral roll, It has 3 wards 13, 14 & 38.

electoral roll

== Religion ==
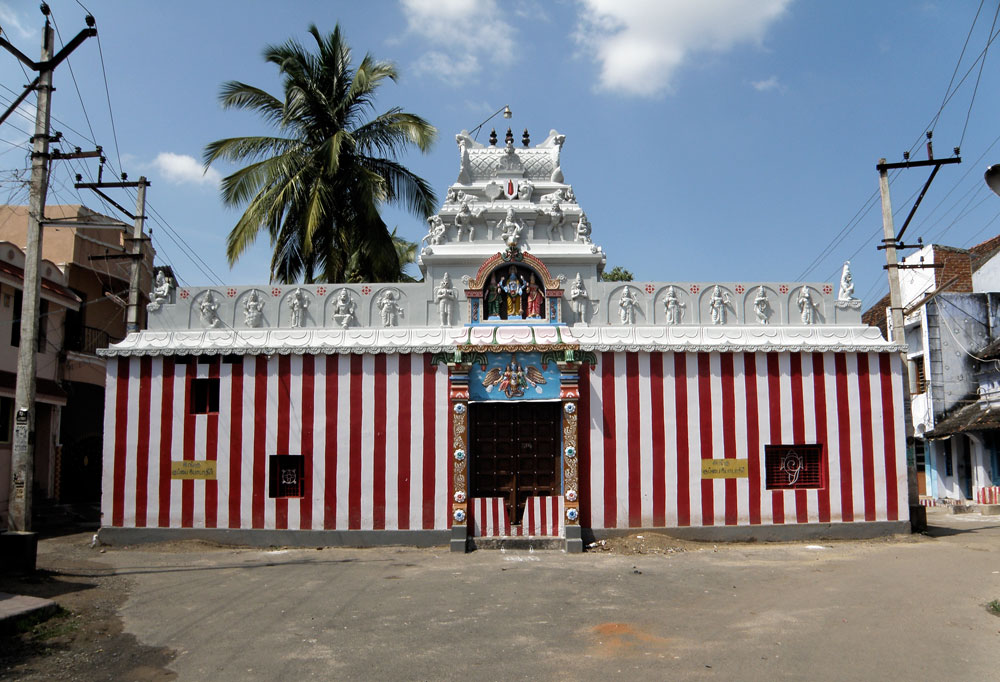
Perumal Kovil

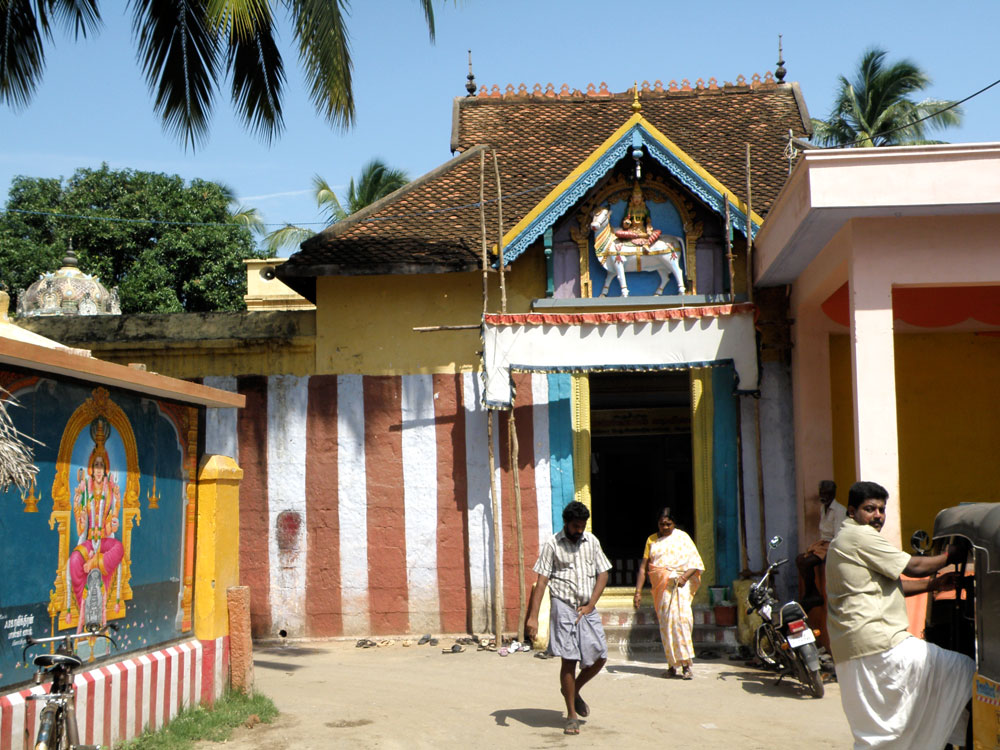
Azhakamman Koil.

The principal temple is Azhagamman Kovil, with its tank. This temple is dedicated to Azhagamman and Sundareswarar from whose names the name of the village is derived. The village is also home to five other temples: Mutharaman Kovil, Perumal Kovil, Idar Theertha Perumal Kovil, Sastha Kovil and Pillayar Kovil. The car festival is held on the month of march.

A rare image of saint Vyagrapada Vigneswari was found in Vadiveeswaram by the Kanyakumari Historical and Cultural Research Centre.

== Festivals ==
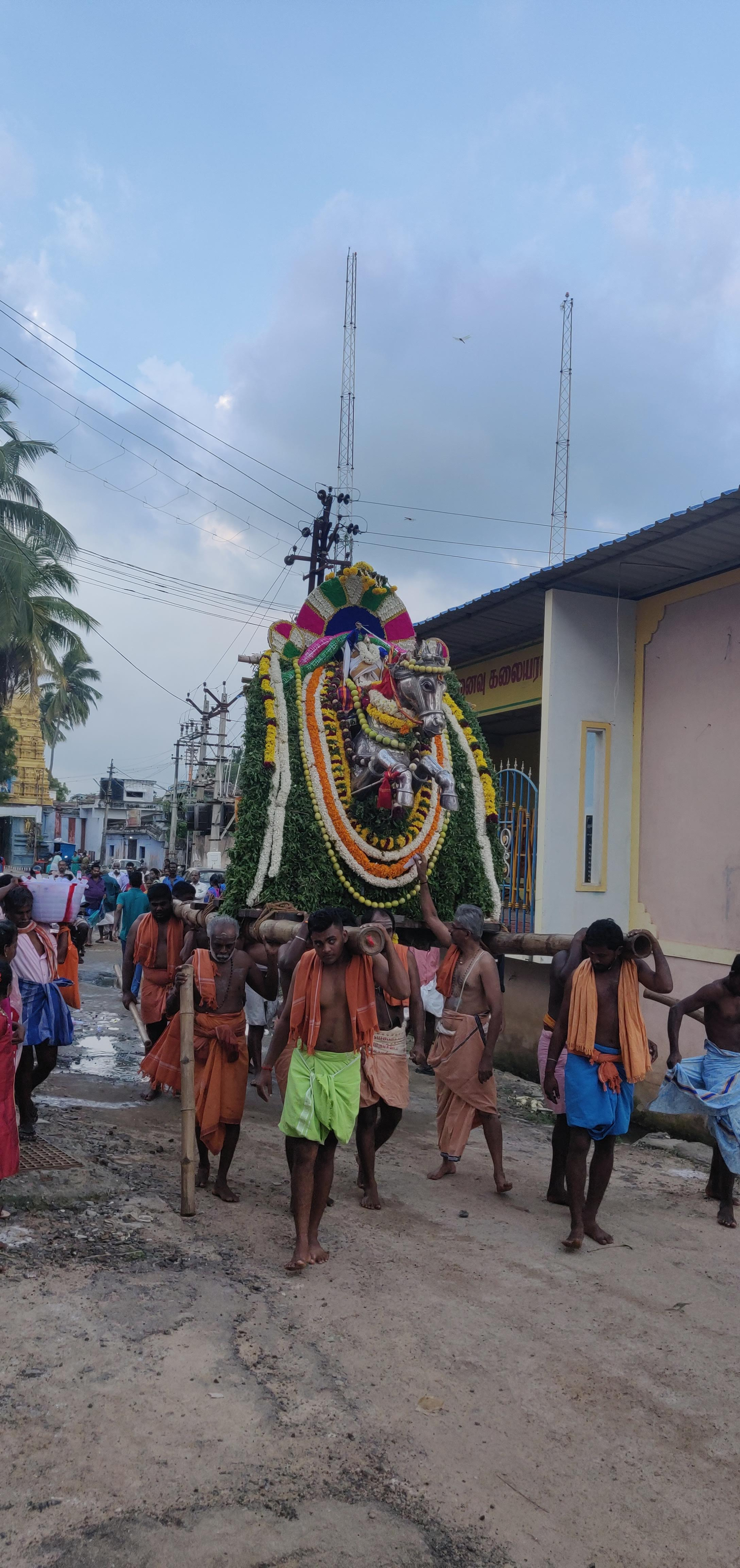
Soora Samharam

The Azhagamman Temple, the biggest in the area presides car festival annually. The temple has two cars which was parked on the middle of the East car street ( Keezha ratha veedhi / Kizhakku ratha veedhi/ கீழ ரத வீதி ). The four prominent streets was named after the car festival which was held in the streets was named as North, East, West & South Car streets respectively.

Another important festival worth to mention was the soorasamhaar/ soora samhaaram (சூரசம்ஹாரம் ) which too was held under azhagamman temple at keezha radha veedhi.

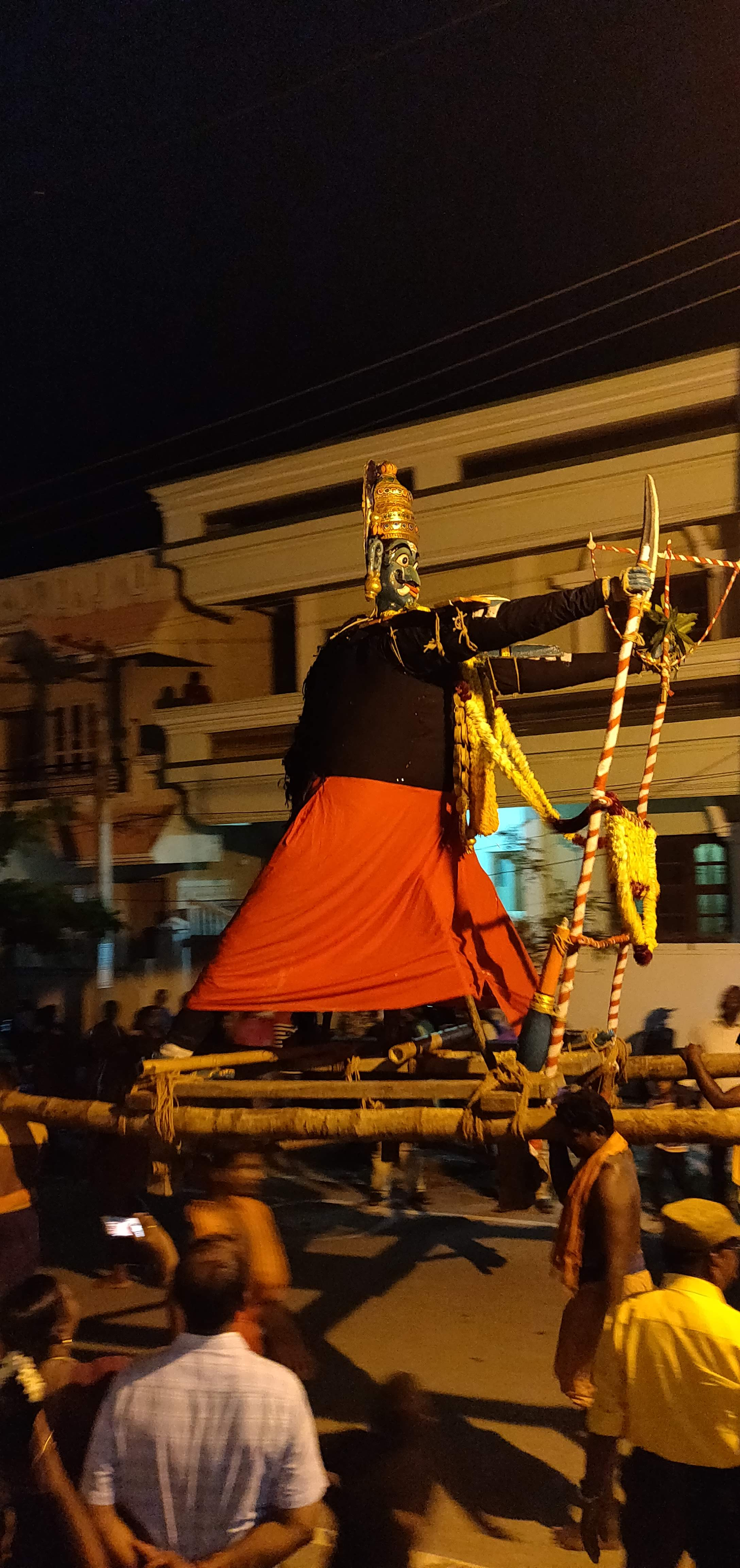
