= Vadasery =

- town
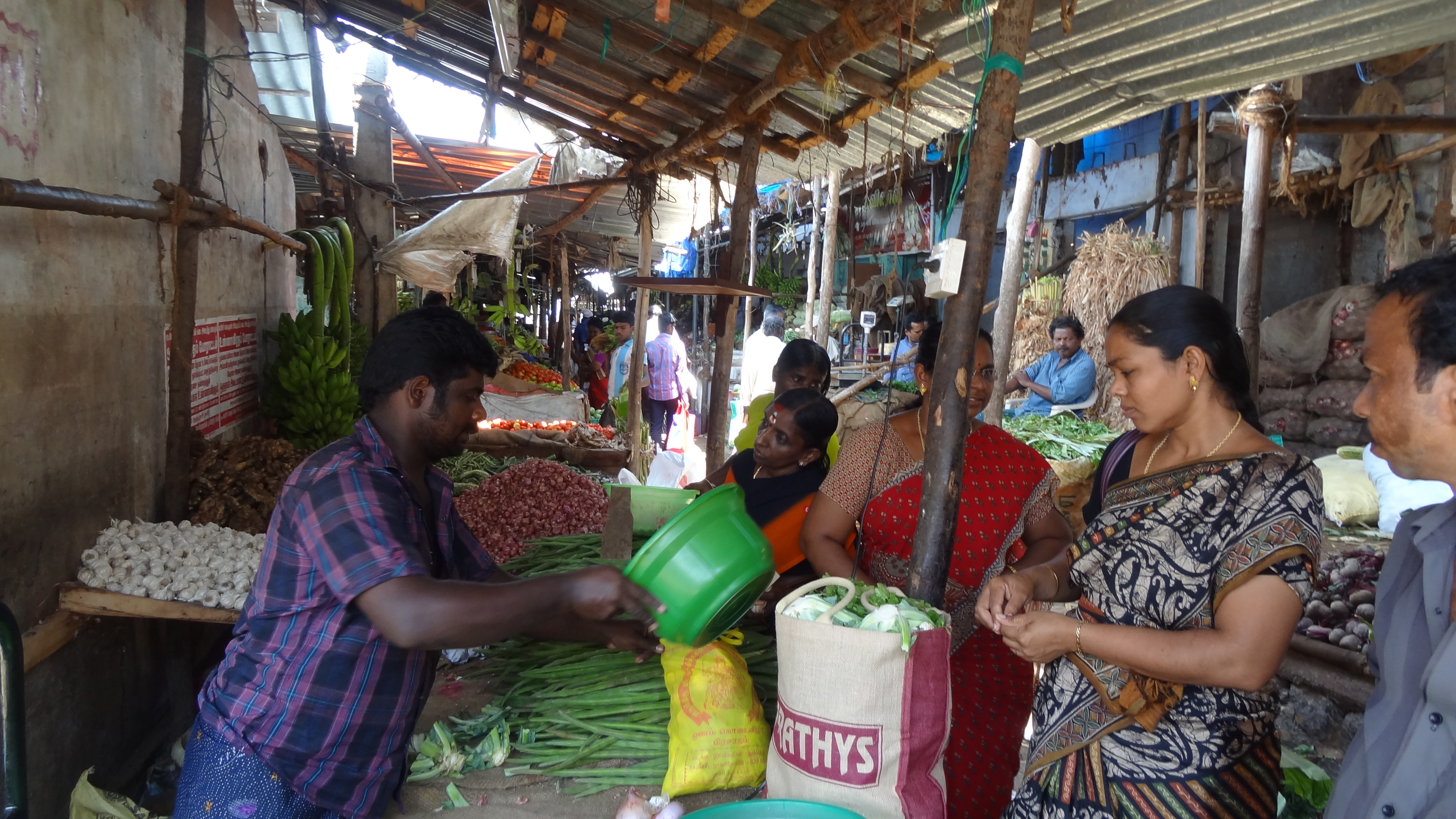
- Kanaga Moolam Market, Vadasery

- Vadasery, Nagercoil, Tamil Nadu
- Coordinates: 8.194200°N 77.433800°E
- INDIA: India
- State: Tamil Nadu
- District: Kanyakumari
- Elevation: 52 m (171 ft)

Languages
  - Official: Tamil
- Time zone: UTC+5:30 (IST)
- PIN: 629 001
- Telephone code: 04652
- Vehicle registration: TN 74

Vadasery is an area/village of Nagercoil city in Kanyakumari district, Tamil Nadu, India. It is also famous for its Christopher (mofussil) bus stand, one of the two bus termini in Nagercoil is located here. Long route (mofussil) buses to other districts in Tamil Nadu and parts of Kerala starts here. It is a thriving region of Nagercoil with large vegetable, fish and meat markets.

Unique temple jewelry is made at Vadasery, Nagercoil. The Vadasery temple jewelry has a Geographical Indications (GI) registry from the Government of India. Indian classical dancers use these jewels.
