= Nagercoil =

- City
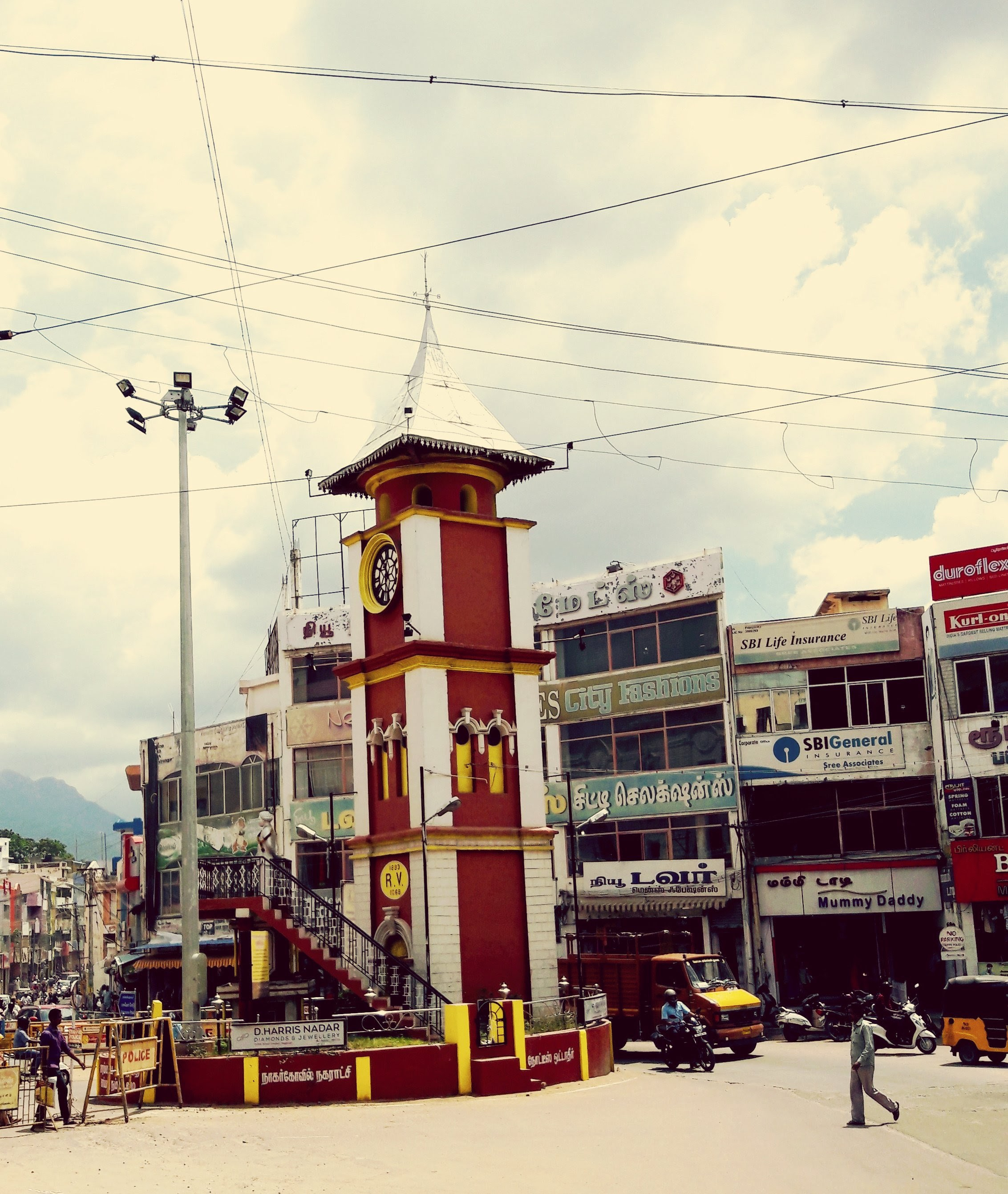
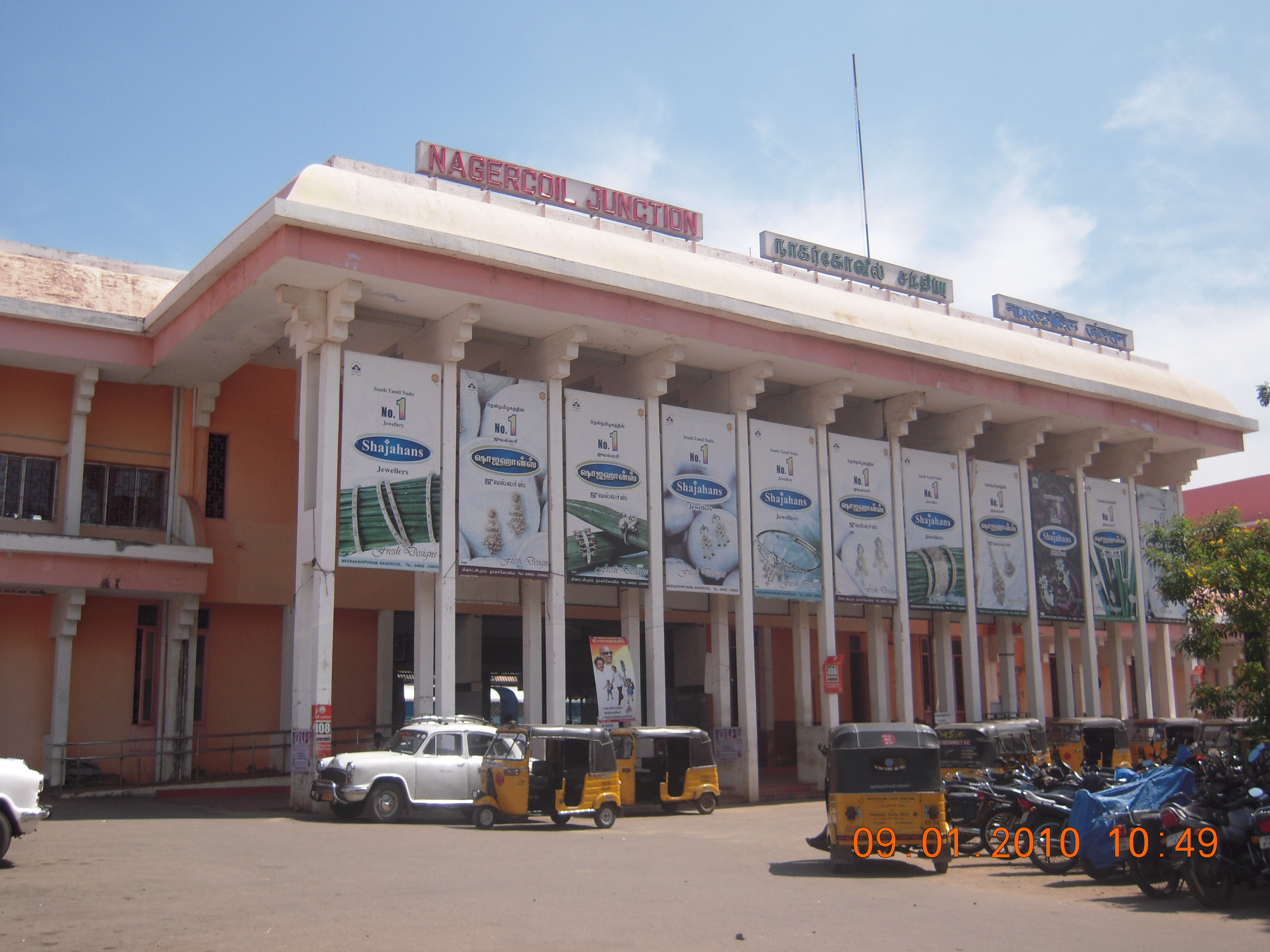
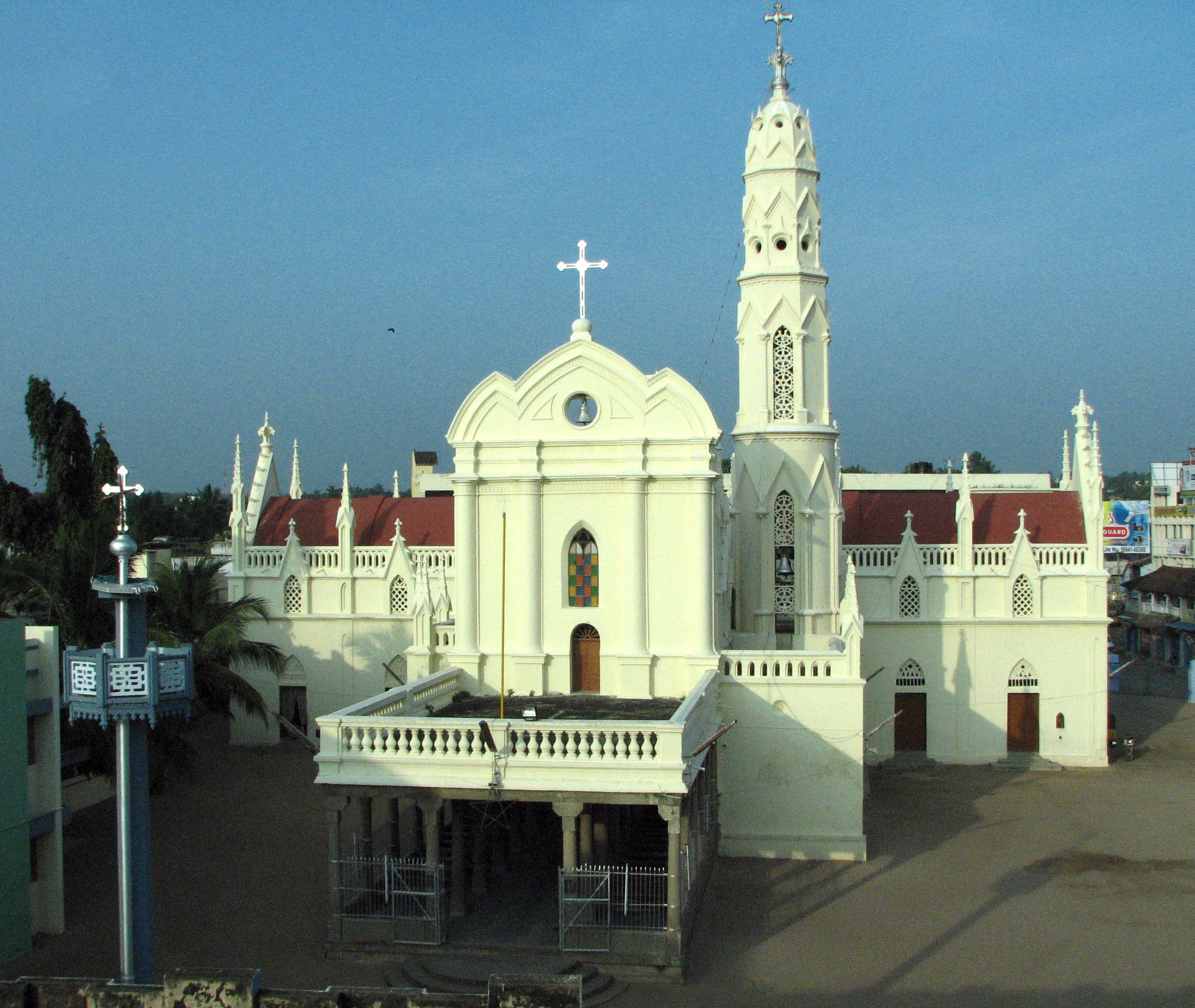
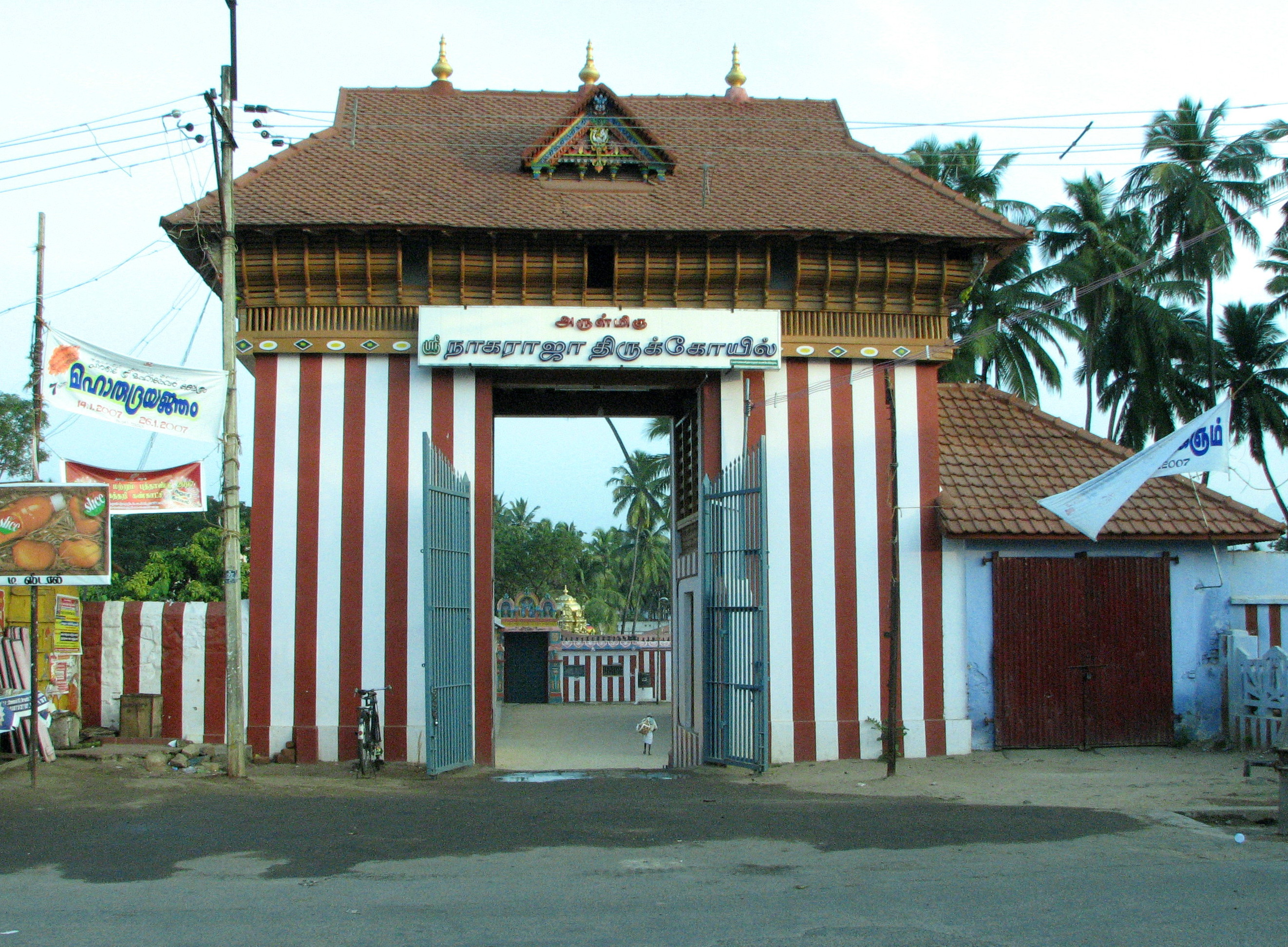
- Clockwise from top: Nagercoil Clock Tower, St. Xavier's Cathedral, Nagaraja Temple, Nagercoil Junction railway station
- Nicknames: Granary of South Travancore, Greenest City of Tamilnadu, City of Temple Jewels, Southernmost City of India
- Location within Tamil Nadu
- Coordinates: 8°10′30″N 77°25′50″E
- Country: India
- State: Tamil Nadu
- District: Kanyakumari
- Named for: "Temple of the Nāgas"

Government
  - Type: Municipal corporation
  - Body: Nagercoil Municipal Corporation
  - Member of Legislative Assembly: S.Austin
  - Mayor: Magesh
  - Deputy Mayor: Mary Princy
  - Corporation Commissioner: Nishant Krishna IAS
  - Member of Parliament: Vijay Vasanth

Area
  - Total: 61.36 km^{2} (23.69 sq mi)
- Elevation: 82 m (269 ft)

Population (2011)
  - Total: 289,916
  - Density: 4,725/km^{2} (12,240/sq mi)

Languages
  - Official: Tamil
- Time zone: UTC+5:30 (IST)
- PIN: 629001,629002,629003,629004
- Telephone code: 91-4652 & 91-4651
- Vehicle registration: TN-74 & TN-75
- Literacy: 96.99%
- Climate: Aw (Köppen)
- Precipitation: 2,477.7 millimetres (97.55 in)

Nagercoil, natively spelt as Nāgarkovil (Tamil: [n̪aːhɐɾkoːʋil], "Temple of the Nāgas", or Nagaraja-Temple), is a City and the administrative headquarters of Kanyakumari District in Tamil Nadu state, India. Situated close to the tip of the Indian peninsula, it lies on an undulating terrain between the Western Ghats and the Arabian Sea.

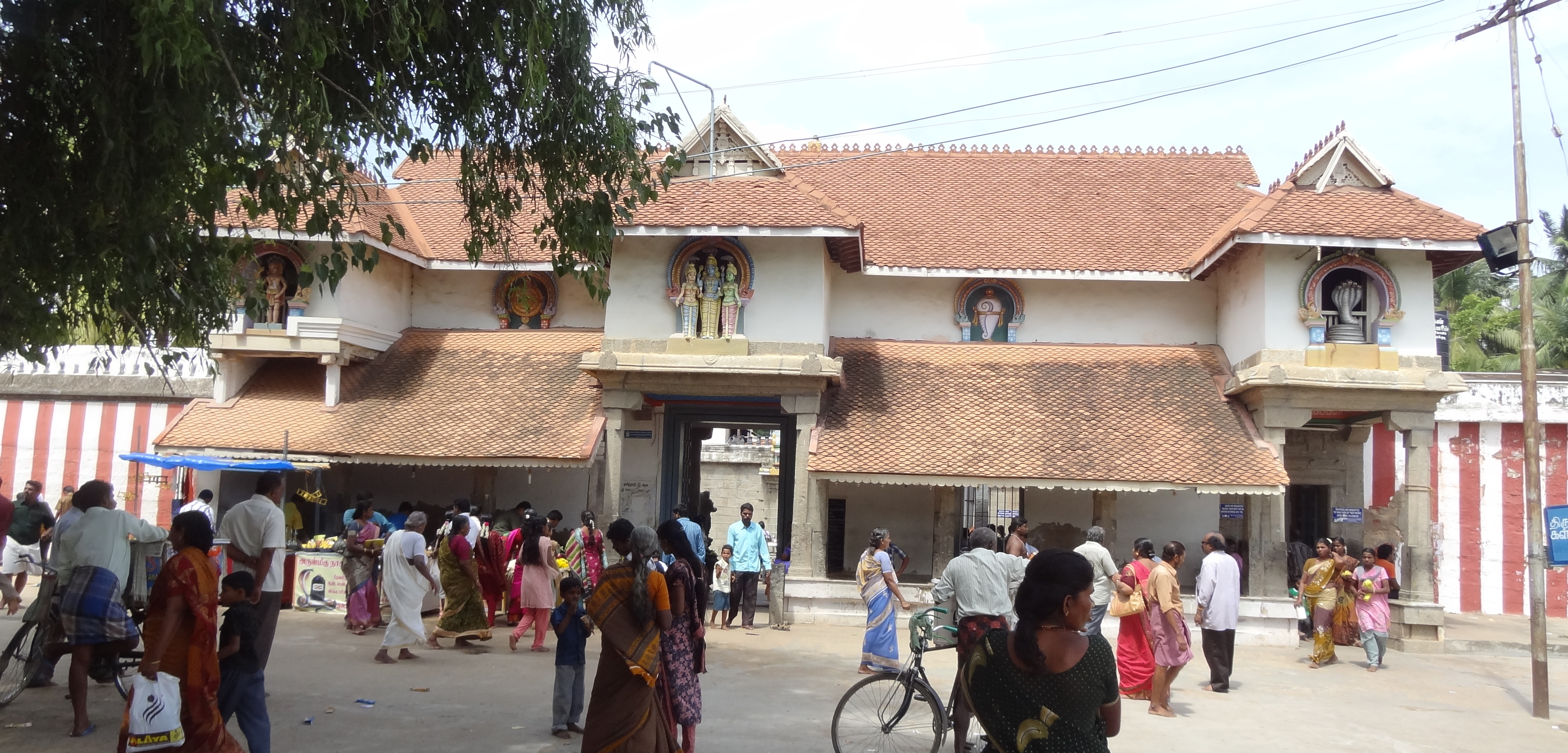
Nagaraja Temple at Nagercoil

Nagercoil is a centre for a range of economic activities in the small but densely populated Kanyakumari District. Economic activities in and around the city include tourism, wind energy, IT services, marine fish production and exports, rubber and cloves plantations, agro-crops, floral production, manufacture of fishnets, rubber products among other activities.

'Nagercoil Cloves' is a distinct quality of dried cloves in the spices market, noted for its aroma and medicinal value. Cloves, pepper and other spices are grown in estates in the Western Ghats, outside the town.

Nagercoil is also the nearest city to the ISRO Propulsion Complex, Mahendragiri and the Kudankulam Nuclear Power Plant.

The city, along with the district of Kanyakumari, stands at the top in many Human Development Index parameters in Tamil Nadu state, including education, per capita income, health indices, etc.

The municipality of Nagercoil was upgraded as a Municipal corporation on the eve of its 100th year as a city on 14 February 2019.

== Etymology ==
Nagercoil derives from the Tamil expression Nagaraja koyil, meaning "temple of Nagas".

== History ==
Nagercoil was formerly known as Kottar.

== Demographics ==
According to the 2011 census, Nagercoil had a population of 289,916 with a female-male sex ratio of 1.05, well above the national average of 0.929 females/male. A total of 20,241 were under the age of six, constituting 10,119 males and 10,122 females. Scheduled Castes and Scheduled Tribes accounted for 4.19% and 0.17% of the population respectively. The literacy rate of the city was 96.99%. The city had a total of 59,997 households. There were a total of 76,345 workers, comprising 244 cultivators, 1,155 main agricultural labourers, 2,271 in household industries, 67,050 other workers, 5,625 marginal workers, 110 marginal cultivators, 361 marginal agricultural labourers, 447 marginal workers in household industries and 4,707 other marginal workers.

Languages of Nagercoil (2011)
1. Tamil (96.8%)
2. Malayalam (1.51%)
3. Saurashtra (0.60%)
4. Telugu (0.55%)
5. Others (0.57%)

== Economy ==
The city is one among the 50 Indian cities to be ranked in the World Startup Index of 1,000 cities.

The major software companies present in Nagercoil are CapeStart Inc., Hinduja Global Solutions, Navigant Consulting.

The city also has small aerospace manufacturing plants and satellite fabricating firms serving the Indian Space Research Organisations facility in ISRO Propulsion Complex, Mahendragiri. The Regional Academic Centre for Space by Indian Space Research Organisation, one among the only six incubation centres for Space Startups in India, is under construction in Nagercoil. The Integral Coach Factory has a small scale windmill unit.

The export of 95 tons of fruits and vegetables to the Gulf Countries through the Thiruvananthapuram airports is a major source of revenue for the city, with food processing companies generating a daily revenue of ₹16.7 lakh (1.67 million) and an annual revenue of ₹6.1 billion. The flower market of Thovalai exports 350 tons of Flowers to Kerala, Europe and Middle Eastern countries generating an annual revenue of ₹250 crore. The major cottage industries like fish-net manufacturing, rubber industries, and jewellery manufacturing are industries serving the domestic and export markets. The minor cottage industries include surgical gloves, coir-making, floral trade, handloom-weaving, cashew nut, spices, food-processing units, and lace-making (export-oriented).

Nagercoil has the highest per capita income of ₹2,76,454 (US$3,800), making it among the richest small cities in India.

=== Energy ===
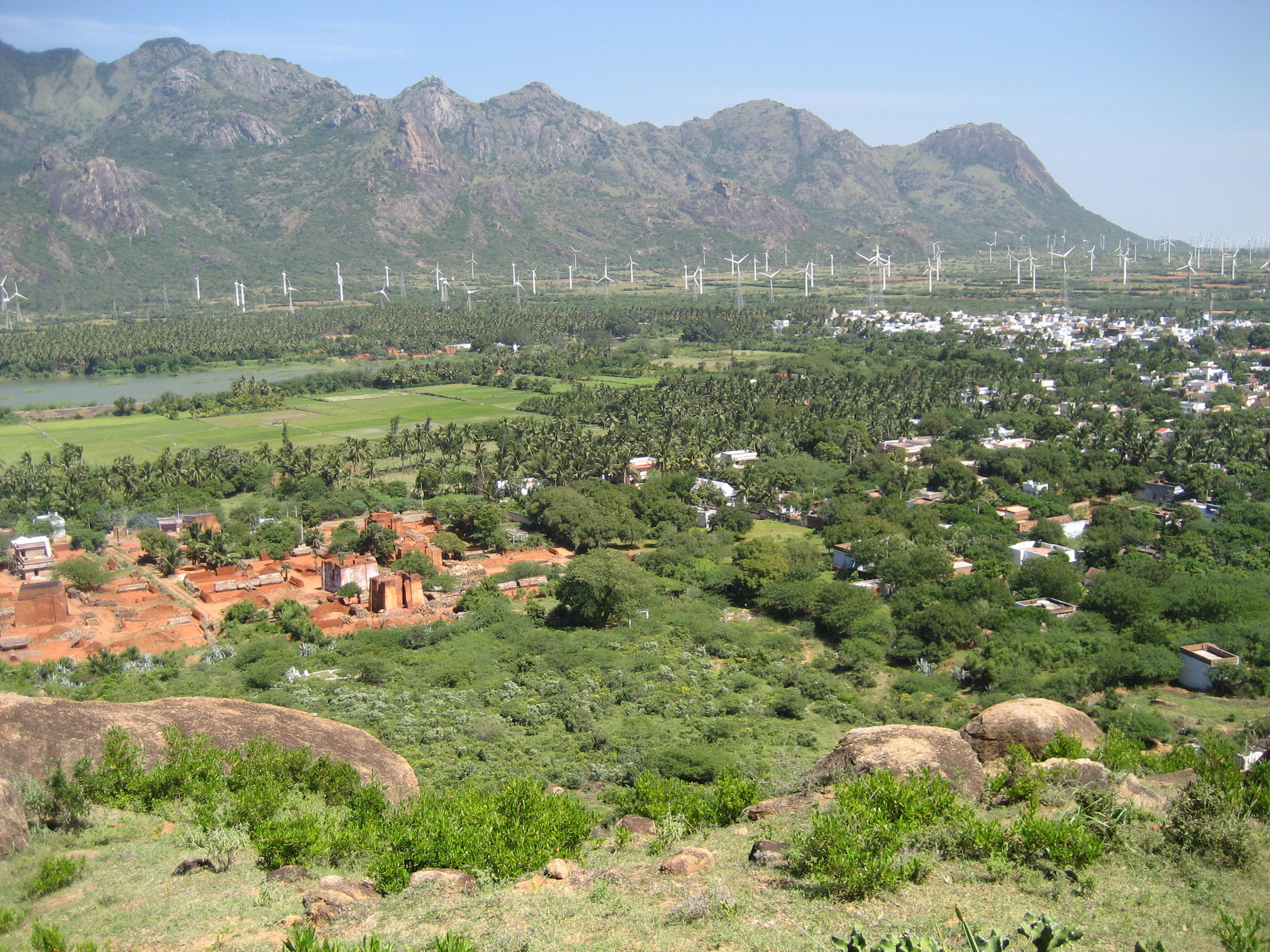
Wind farm in Muppandal and Aralvaimozhi region near Nagercoil

The city has an installed windmill capacity of 1500 MW catering to 20% of the state's renewable electricity needs. Muppandhal has emerged as the wind power hub, with plant owners eager to cash in on the ₹2.90 per unit purchase price being offered by the Tamil Nadu Electricity Board.

== Architecture ==
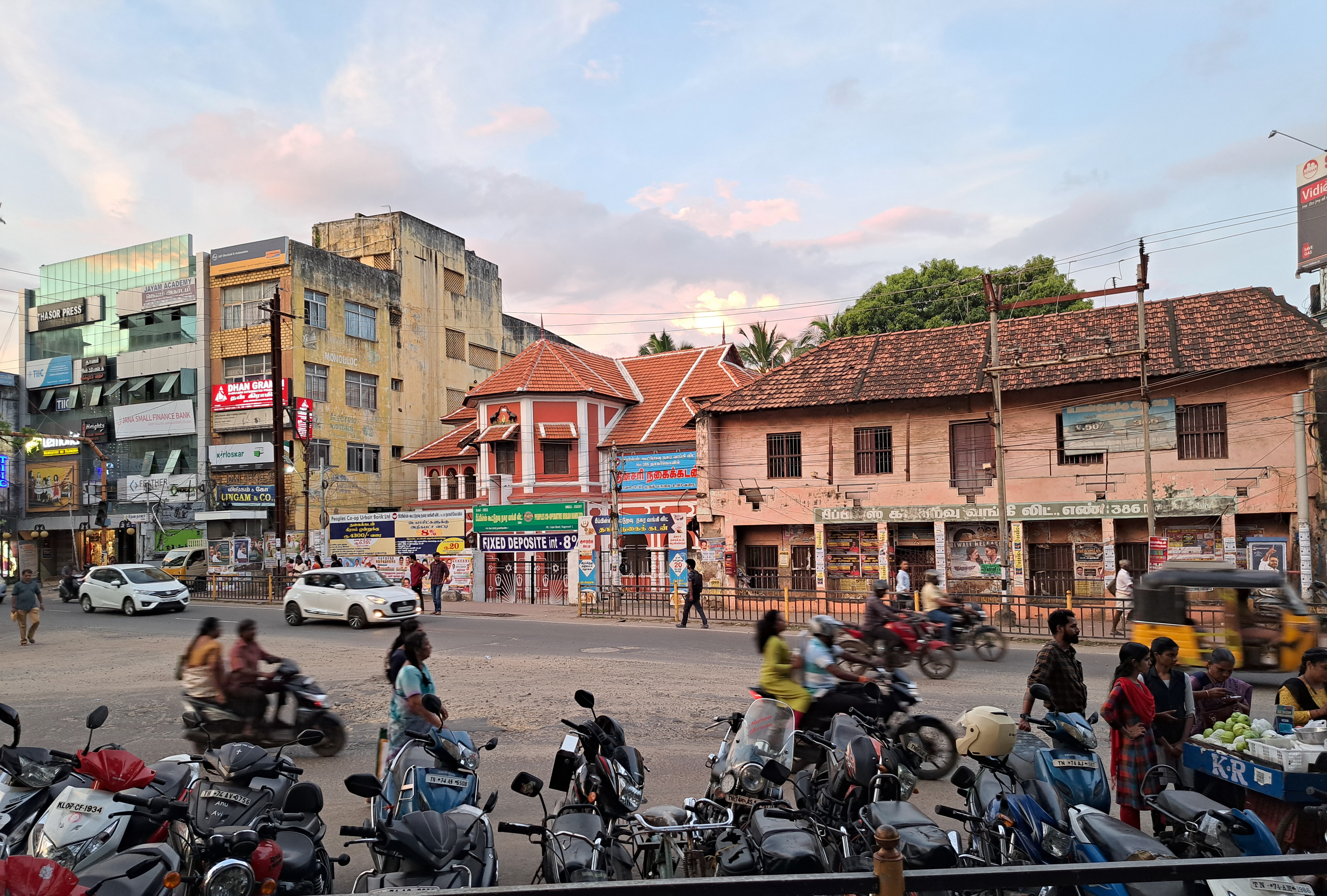
View of Nagercoil buildings

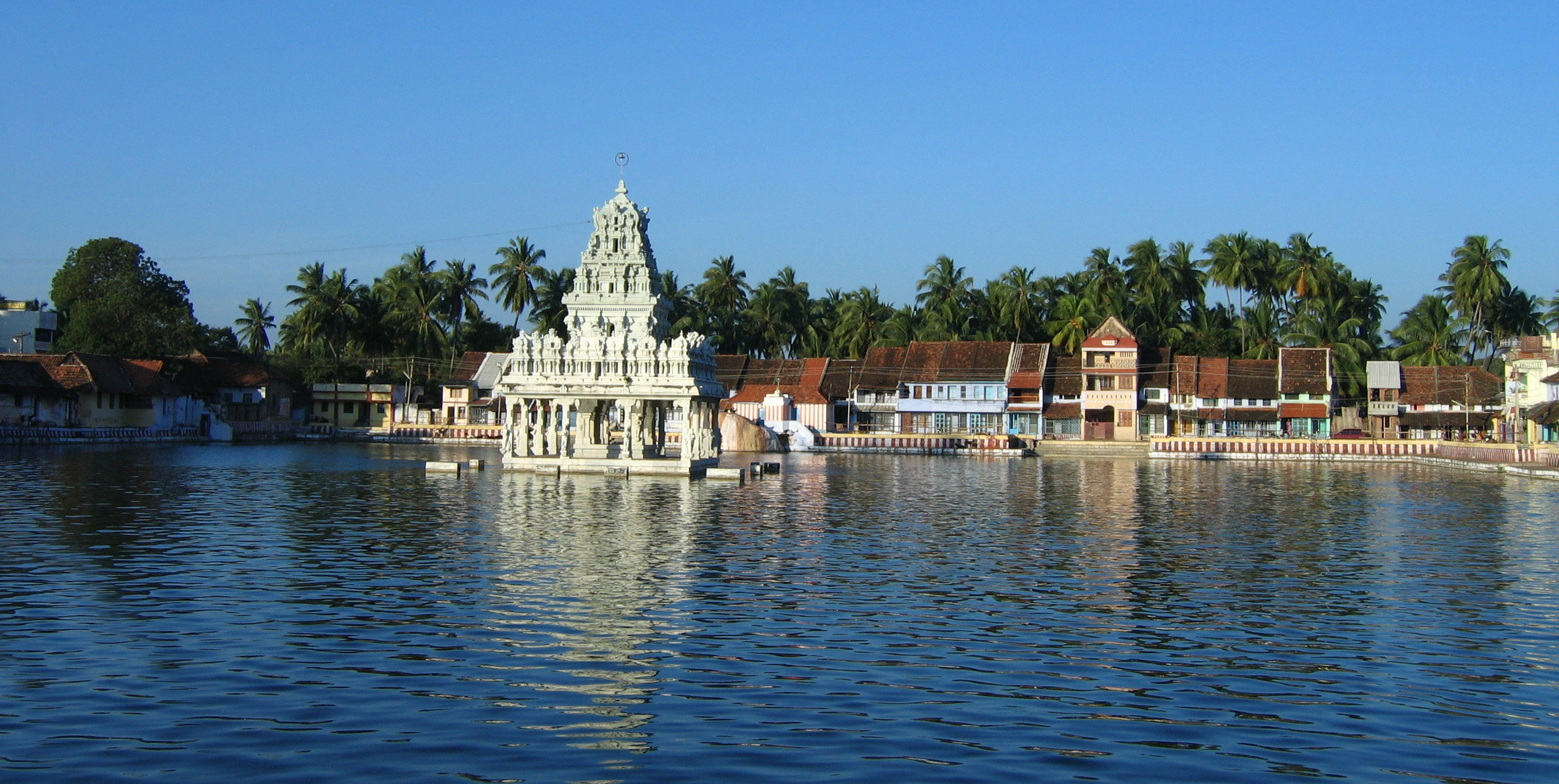
The Thanumalayan Temple Pond and its adjoining streets inhabited since the 16th century

The architecture of Nagercoil consists of an eclectic combination of architectural styles, ranging from those that predate the creation of the town, from the early Dravidian architecture and Kerala Architecture, to English Gothic Revival, to the 21st century contemporary. Although there are prehistoric and classical structures in the city, the architectural history of Nagercoil effectively begins with the first small settlements from 3 AD. The Roman naturalist and writer Pliny the Elder mentions Nagercoil as a commercial metropolis, having trade links with his contemporaneous Roman merchants, who traded and stayed in unique rock-walled, clay-roofed structures. This legacy can be found in some of the town's old heritage structures like the Nagaraja Temple, Nagercoil. The temple has two main deities, Krishna (revered as Ananda Krishna) and Nagaraja. The upadevathas are Shiva, Subrahmanya Swami, Ganesha, Devi, and Dwarapalaka. As an ancient tradition, the priests are Namboothiri Brahmins who are referred by the Pambumekkat mana in Thrissur, Kerala. Later on, Dravidian and Kerala architectural styles began to appear in the area. This can be attributed to the construction of the Thanumalayan Temple in the 16th century.

The 14th century St. Francis Xavier's Cathedral, Kottar serves as a testimony to the mix of Roman and native architecture. While Saint Xavier was doing missionary work at Kottar and its neighbourhood, he averted an invasion of Padagas and thus protected the people of the Venad kingdom from that attack which was appreciated by the king, Unni Kerala Varma. In recognition of Xavier's services, the king allotted him a piece of land to construct a Catholic church, as a gesture of goodwill, as per the church records. There was already a small church, in the same place where St. Xavier's church stands at present, dedicated to Mary the Mother of God, since AD 1544.

The artistic influence of Kerala and British architecture marvels are seen in the Nagercoil Palace, Nagercoil Clock Tower, Home Church, Scott Christian College, Scott School, Carmel Higher Secondary School, St. Joseph Convent, Sethu Lakshmi Bai School, Nagercoil Court, The Concordia Seminary, Filter House, The Salvation Army Catherine Booth Hospital and many more heritage structures in and around the town.

Nagercoil also is home to a parish of the Malankara Orthodox Syrian Church under the Diocese of Trivandrum, St. George Orthodox Church at Suriyani Nasrani Nagar in the city. This parish serves Malayali Orthodox Christians who have settled in Nagercoil.

The Nagercoil Clock Tower is the most visible to the outside world, situated in the heart of the town, which was built to commemorate the visit of Sri Moolam Thirunal, the ruler of Travancore, in 1893, and was designed by Hogeorf and S. Horesly of England. The Maharajah himself inaugurated it on 15 February of that year. The pendulum of the clock was made in Derbyshire by Smith of Derby Group, London. The clock is attached to a 60-foot-long chain with a weight, operated with pulleys through gravitational force. The clock in the Nagercoil Clock Tower was presented to the Maharajah by Rev. James Duthie. of the London Missionary Society. The total cost for constructing the Nagercoil Clock Tower was ₹ 3,258, 9 Chakrams and 12 Kasu. The Maharajah of Travancore donated ₹ 1017, and the balance was donated by the public.

== Politics ==
Municipal officials

Commissioner	Nishant Krishna I.A.S.
District Collector	Alagu Meena I.A.S
Superintendent of Police	Dr.Stalin I.P.S

== Education ==
Tamil is the official language in Nagercoil and is spoken by the majority of the population. In addition to Tamil, English and Malayalam are widely spoken. There are many schools and colleges in Nagercoil that are known for their national reputation and were established more than 150 years ago; colleges such as Scott Christian College (est. 1809), South Travancore Hindu College (est. 1952), Holy Cross College (est. 1965), Women Christian College and schools such as Scott Christian Higher Secondary School (est. 1819), Duthie Girls School (est. 1819), St. Joseph's Convent Higher Secondary School (est. 1910), Carmel Higher Secondary School (est. 1922), S.L.B. Government Higher Secondary School (est. 1924), S.M.R.V. Higher Secondary School (est. 1919).

=== Literacy rate ===
The literacy rate is at 96.99% higher than the national average of 74.04% and state average of 80.09%.

== Culture ==
At Vadasery, a locality in Nagercoil, unique Temple jewellery is made. The Vadasery Temple jewellery has Geographical Indications (GI) registry of the Government of India. These jewels are used by classical dancers in India.

Onam is a festival which is widely celebrated among the Malayalam-speaking population by drawing the 'athapoo' on the floor.

Navaratri is uniquely celebrated here with an inter-state tradition in which the idols of Goddess Munuthithanankai Amman from Suchindrum, Goddess Saraswati from Padmanabhapuram Palace and Lord Kumaraswamy from Kumarakovil travel to Thiruvananthapuram. A ceremonial welcome is given to the idols of the Gods by the officials and representatives of the Government of Kerala. After the ten days of Navratri festival, they return to the respective temples with great celebrations.

== Transport ==
=== Bus ===
There are three main bus stands in the city.

- Nagercoil Municipal Corporation Christopher Bus Stand (Vadasery): The terminus, spread over an area of 9.49 acres, serves as a hub for transportation and commercial activities in the region. It features 52 bus bays, which accommodate a variety of buses including Mofussil buses and long-distance buses. These buses connect Nagercoil with major cities across Tamil Nadu and Kerala, facilitating both local commuting and intercity travel.

In addition to the bus bays, the terminus houses essential facilities such as a reservation counter for ticketing services. It also includes numerous commercial and refreshment outlets, providing amenities to travellers and visitors alike. Overall, the terminus plays a crucial role in Nagercoil's transportation infrastructure, offering convenience and connectivity for passengers travelling within the state and to neighbouring Kerala.

Frequent bus services to Marthandam, Thiruvananthapuram, Valliyur, Tirunelveli, Kovilpatti, Virudhunagar, Madurai, Karaikudi, Dindigul, Thoothukudi, Tiruchendur available from here. Also scheduled long distances buses to Chennai, Salem, Krishnagiri, Hosur, Bengaluru, Palani, Pollachi, Tiruppur, Ooty, Thanjavur, Nagapattinam, Velankanni, Kodaikanal, Trichy, Ariyalur, Virudhachalam, Kumbakonam, Chidambaram, Cuddalore, Puducherry, Pudukkottai, Thanjavur, Vellore, Chittoor, Tirupathi operated from here. The terminus is well utilized by buses belonging to the Tamil Nadu State Transport Corporation (TNSTC), State Express Transport Corporation (SETC), and Kerala State Road Transport Corporation.

- Anna Bus Stand (Meenakshipuram, Nagercoil): The terminus, spanning 2.31 acres, is a pivotal hub for local bus services within Kanyakumari district and to Tirunelveli district. It features 25 bus bays, facilitating the operation and organization of various bus routes connecting different parts of these districts.

Local buses primarily serve the commuting needs of residents within the Kanyakumari district, offering reliable transportation options for daily travel and commuting purposes. Additionally, buses to Tirunelveli district provide connectivity for inter-district travel, enabling passengers to reach destinations across both districts efficiently.

As a central point for bus operations, the terminus enhances accessibility and convenience for travelers, ensuring smooth connectivity between different areas within Kanyakumari and to the neighbouring Tirunelveli district.

- Vadasery Omni Bus Stand: Intrastate and Interstate private buses are operated from here.

=== Rail ===
There are two railway stations in the city

- Nagercoil Junction Railway station (NCJ)

The main railway station (Also called Kottar Railway Station) of the city and one of the most important railway stations in Tamil Nadu coming under NSG–3 category. It consists of 6PF (02 under progress) and 12 tracks. The railway station is located on Kanyakumari- Trivandrum BG Line and Nagercoil- Tirunelveli BG Line. Direct trains to many parts of the state like Chennai, Kanyakumari, Rameshwaram, Coimbatore, Tiruchirappalli, Tirunelveli, and long-distance trains to other state cities like Mumbai, Pune, Mangalore, Jammu, Varanasi Delhi, Shalimar, Dibrugarh, Bangalore, Katra, Kacheguda, Howrah, are also operated from here/passing through this station.

- Nagercoil Town Railway station (NJT)

The station lies on Kanyakumari- Trivandrum BG Line. Many important express trains and local trains to Trivandrum halt here. Also, some trains skip the main station due to loco rake reversal halt here.

== Sports ==
Anna Stadium in Nagercoil hosts a Khelo India Centre for athletics, one of the district-level centres supported under the Khelo India scheme.

Sports Development Authority of Tamil Nadu (SDAT) maintains Aringar Anna Outdoor Stadium in Vadasery and SDAT indoor Stadium in Konam, Nagercoil. It also has a swimming pool.

Nagercoil also has various sports clubs that promote various sports activities.

Nagercoil Fencing Club promotes fencing sports in Nagercoil.

Also, there are various Non-govt sports clubs like The District Club, The Nagercoil Club, The Tirnity club and Ramavarmapuram Club.
