= Bibliography of A. P. J. Abdul Kalam =

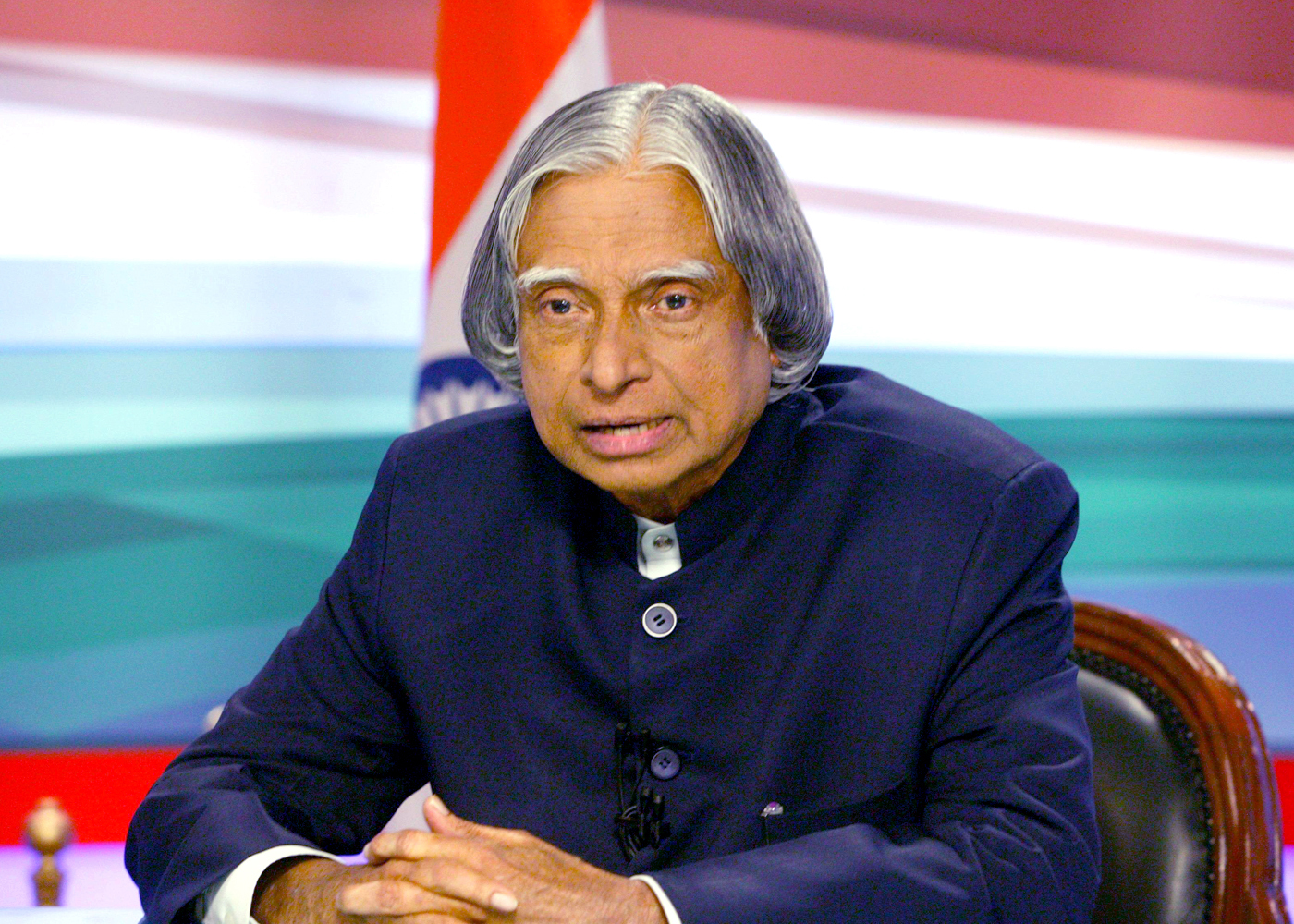
Abdul Kalam in 2007

A. P. J. Abdul Kalam was an Indian aerospace scientist and statesman who served as president of India from 2002 to 2007. Born in Rameswaram in Southern India, Kalam spent four decades as a scientist and science administrator, mainly at the Defence Research and Development Organisation and Indian Space Research Organisation and was intimately involved in India's civilian space programme and military missile development efforts. He was known as the "Missile Man of India" for his work on the development of ballistic missile and launch vehicle technology. He also played a pivotal organisational, technical, and political role in India's Pokhran-II nuclear tests in 1998.

He was elected as the president of India in 2002 and was widely referred to as the "People's President". He engaged in teaching, writing and public service after his presidency. He was a recipient of several awards, including the Bharat Ratna, India's highest civilian honour.

== Books ==
Kalam has authored more than 25 books. His books have garnered interest in various countries.

List of books
Title	Co-author	Publisher	Year	ISBN
Developments in Fluid Mechanics and Space Technology	Roddam Narasimha	Indian Academy of Sciences	1988	
India 2020: A Vision for the New Millennium	Y. S. Rajan	Penguin Random House	1998	978-0-670-88271-7
Wings of Fire	Arun Tiwari	Universities Press	1999	978-8-173-71146-6
Ignited Minds: Unleashing the Power within India		Penguin Books	2002	978-0-670-04928-8
Transformation	A. Sivathanu Pillai		2004	978-0-070-53154-3
The Luminous Sparks: A Biography in Verse and Colours		Punya Publishing	2004	978-8-190-18978-1
Guiding Souls: Dialogues on the Purpose of Life	Arun Tiwari	Ocean Books	2005	978-8-188-32274-9
Mission India : A Vision for Indian youth	Manav Gupta	Penguin Books	2005	978-0-14-333499-6
Inspiring Thoughts: Quotation Series		Rajpal & Sons	2007	978-81-7028-684-4
You Are Born To Blossom: Take my Journey Beyond	Arun Tiwari	Ocean Books	2010	978-8-184-30037-6
The Scientific India: A Twenty First Century Guide to the World around Us	Y. S. Rajan	Penguin Books	2011	978-0-143-41687-6
Failure to Success: Legendary Lives	Arun Tiwari	Orient Blackswan	2011	978-8-125-04212-9
Target 3 Billion: Innovative Solutions towards Sustainable Development	Srijan Pal Singh	Penguin Books	2011	978-0-143-41730-9
You are Unique: Scale New Heights by Thoughts and Actions	Poonam Kohli	Punya Publishing	2012	978-0-143-41730-9
Turning Points: A Journey through Challenges		Harper Collins	2012	978-9-350-29347-8
Indomitable Spirit		Rajpal & Sons	2013	978-8-170-28879-4
Spirit of India		Rajpal & Sons	2013	978-8-170-28795-7
My Journey: Transforming Dreams into Actions		Rupa Publications	2014	978-8-129-12491-3
We Can do it: Thoughts for Change	A. Sivathanu Pillai	Shree Book Centre	2014	978-9-350-49763-0
Governance for Growth in India		Rupa Publications	2014	978-8-129-13260-4
A Manifesto for Change: A Sequel to India 2020	V. Ponraj	Harper Collins	2014	978-9-351-36172-5
Forge Your Future: Candid, Forthright, Inspiring		Rajpal & Sons	2014	978-93-5064-279-5
Beyond 2020: A Vision for Tomorrow’s India		Viking Publishing	2014	978-0-670-08796-9
The Guiding Light: A Selection of Quotations from My Favourite Books		Rupa Publications	2015	978-8-129-13486-8
Reignited: Scientific Pathways to a Brighter Future	Srijan Pal Singh	Penguin Books	2015	978-0-143-33354-8
The Family and the Nation	Acharya Mahapragya	Harper Collins	2015	978-8-172-23727-1
Transcendence: My Spiritual Experiences with Pramukh Swamiji	Arun Tiwari	Harper Collins	2015	978-9-351-77405-1
Advantage India: From Challenge to Opportunity	Srijan Pal Singh	Harper Collins	2015	978-9-351-77645-1
