= Death and state funeral of A. P. J. Abdul Kalam =

2015 death of former Indian president

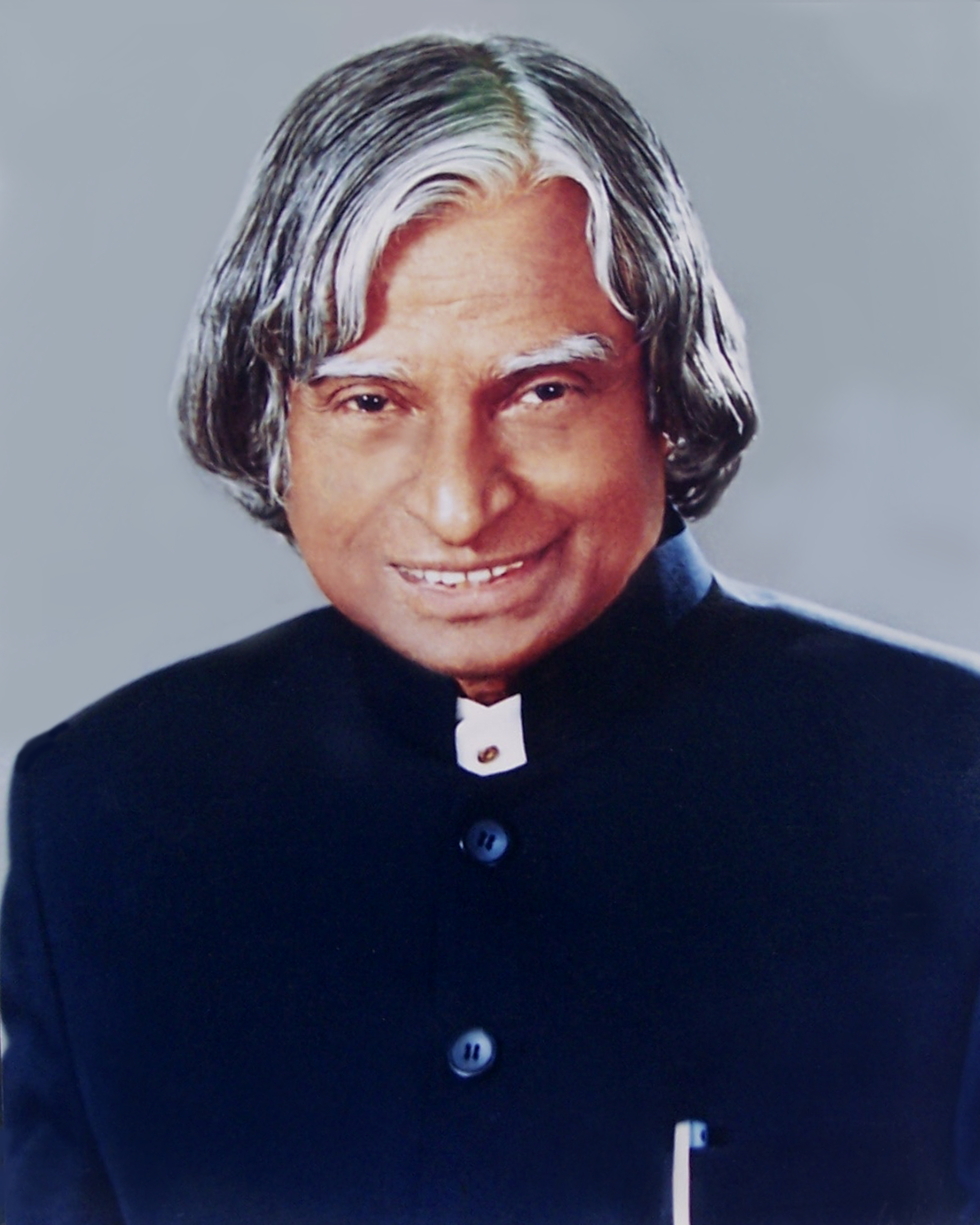
- Official portrait, 2002
- Date: 27 July 2015 (date of death); 30 July 2015 (date of state funeral)
- Location: Bethany Hospital, Shillong, Meghalaya (death) Pei Karumbu Ground, Rameswaram, Tamil Nadu (state funeral)
- Burial: Dr. A. P. J. Abdul Kalam Memorial, Rameswaram

On 27 July 2015, A. P. J. Abdul Kalam, the 11th president of India, died due to cardiac arrest at the age of 83. He was given a state funeral on 30 July 2015. His lying in state occurred at his official residence of 10 Rajaji Marg, New Delhi and his burial took place at his home town in Rameswaram.

== Death ==
On 27 July 2015, Kalam travelled to Shillong to deliver a lecture on "Creating a Livable Planet Earth" at the Indian Institute of Management Shillong. While climbing a flight of stairs, he experienced some discomfort, but was able to enter the auditorium after a brief rest. At around 6:35 p.m. IST, only five minutes into his lecture, he collapsed. He was rushed to the nearby Bethany Hospital in a critical condition; upon arrival, he lacked a pulse or any other signs of life. Despite being placed in the intensive care unit, Kalam was confirmed dead of a sudden cardiac arrest at 7:45 p.m. IST. His last words, to his aide Srijan Pal Singh, were reportedly: "Funny guy! Are you doing well?"

== State funeral ==
Following his death, Kalam's body was airlifted in an Indian Air Force helicopter from Shillong to Guwahati, from where it was flown to New Delhi on the morning of 28 July in an air force C-130J Hercules. The flight landed at Palam Air Base that afternoon and was received by the then President Pranab Mukherjee, the then Vice President Mohammad Hamid Ansari, the Prime Minister Narendra Modi, Chief Minister of Delhi Arvind Kejriwal, and the three service chiefs of the Indian Armed Forces, who laid wreaths on Kalam's body. His body was then placed on a gun carriage draped with the Indian flag and taken to his Delhi residence at 10 Rajaji Marg; there, the public and numerous dignitaries paid homage, including former prime minister Manmohan Singh, Congress President Sonia Gandhi and Vice-president Rahul Gandhi, and Uttar Pradesh Chief Minister Akhilesh Yadav.

On the morning of 29 July, Kalam's body, wrapped in the Indian flag, was taken to Palam Air Base and flown to Madurai in an air force C-130J aircraft, arriving at Madurai Airport that afternoon. His body was received at the airport by the three service chiefs and national and state dignitaries, including cabinet ministers Manohar Parrikar, Venkaiah Naidu, Pon Radhakrishnan and the governors of Tamil Nadu and Meghalaya, K. Rosaiah and V. Shanmuganathan. After a brief ceremony, Kalam's body was flown by air force helicopter to the town of Mandapam, from where it was taken in an army truck to his hometown of Rameswaram. Upon arriving at Rameswaram, his body was displayed in an open area in front of the local bus station to allow the public to pay their final respects until 8 p.m. that evening.

On 30 July 2015, the former president was laid to rest at Rameswaram's Pei Karumbu Ground with full state honours. Over 350,000 people attended the last rites, including the Prime Minister, the governor of Tamil Nadu and the chief ministers of Karnataka, Kerala and Andhra Pradesh.

== Reactions ==
India reacted to Kalam's death with an outpouring of grief; numerous tributes were paid to the former president across the nation and on social media. The Government of India declared a seven-day state mourning period as a mark of respect. President Pranab Mukherjee, Vice-president Hamid Ansari, Home Minister Rajnath Singh, and other leaders condoled the former President's demise. Prime Minister Narendra Modi said "Kalam's death is a great loss to the scientific community. He took India to great heights. He showed the way." Former Prime Minister Dr Manmohan Singh, who had served as prime minister under Kalam, said, "our country has lost a great human being who made phenomenal contributions to the promotion of self-reliance in defence technologies. I worked very closely with Dr. Kalam as prime minister and I greatly benefited from his advice as president of our country. His life and work will be remembered for generations to come." ISRO chairman A. S. Kiran Kumar called his former colleague "a great personality and a gentleman", while former chairman G. Madhavan Nair described Kalam as "a global leader" for whom "the downtrodden and poor people were his priority. He always had a passion to convey what is in his mind to the young generation", adding that his death left a vacuum which none could fill.

South Asian leaders expressed condolences and lauded the late statesman.

- Afghanistan: Ashraf Ghani, the President of Afghanistan, called Kalam "an inspirational figure to millions of people," noting that "we have a lot to learn from his life".
- Bangladesh: Prime Minister Sheikh Hasina described Kalam as "a rare combination of a great statesman, acclaimed scientist, and a source of inspiration to the young generation of South Asia" and termed his death an "irreparable loss to India and beyond". Bangladesh Nationalist Party chief Khaleda Zia said "as a nuclear scientist, he engaged himself in the welfare of the people".
- Bhutan: The Bhutanese government ordered the country's flags to fly at half-staff to mourn Kalam's death and lit 1000 butter lamps in homage. Bhutanese Prime Minister Tshering Tobgay expressed deep sadness, saying Kalam "was a leader greatly admired by all people, especially the youth of India who have referred to him as the people's President".
- Nepal: Nepalese Prime Minister Sushil Koirala recalled Kalam's scientific contributions to India: "Nepal has lost a good friend and I have lost an honoured and ideal personality."
- Pakistan: The President of Pakistan, Mamnoon Hussain, and Prime Minister of Pakistan Nawaz Sharif also expressed their grief and condolences on his death.
- Sri Lanka: The President of Sri Lanka, Maithripala Sirisena, also expressed his condolences. "Dr. Kalam was a man of firm conviction and indomitable spirit, and I saw him as an outstanding statesman of the world. His death is an irreparable loss not only to India but to the entire world."
- Maldives: Maldivian President Abdulla Yameen and Vice-president Ahmed Adeeb condoled Kalam's death, with Yameen naming him as a close friend of the Maldives who would continue to be an inspiration to Indians and generations of South Asians. Former President Maumoon Abdul Gayoom, who had made an official visit to India during Kalam's presidency, termed his demise as a great loss to all of humankind.
- Myanmar: The Commander-in-Chief of the Myanmar Armed Forces, Senior General Min Aung Hlaing, expressed condolences on behalf of the Myanmar government.
- Tibet: The Dalai Lama expressed his sadness and offered condolences and prayers, calling Kalam's death "an irreparable loss".
- Canada: Kathleen Wynne, the Premier of Ontario, which Kalam had visited on numerous occasions, expressed "deepest condolences ... as a respected scientist, he played a critical role in the development of the Indian space programme. As a committed educator, he inspired millions of young people to achieve their very best. And as a devoted leader, he gained support both at home and abroad, becoming known as 'the people's President'. I join our Indo–Canadian families, friends, and neighbours in mourning the passing of this respected leader."
- United States: United States President Barack Obama extended "deepest condolences to the people of India on the passing of former Indian President Dr. APJ Abdul Kalam", and highlighted his achievements as a scientist and as a statesman, notably his role in strengthening US–India relations and increasing space co-operation between the two nations. "Suitably named 'the People's President', Dr. Kalam's humility and dedication to public service served as an inspiration to millions of Indians and admirers around the world."
- Russia: Russian President Vladimir Putin expressed sincere condolences and conveyed his sympathy and support "to the near and dear ones of the deceased leader, to the government, and entire people of India". He remarked on Kalam's outstanding "personal contribution to the social, economic, scientific, and technical progress of India and in ensuring its national security," adding that Kalam would be remembered as a "consistent exponent of closer friendly relations between our nations, who has done a lot for cementing mutually beneficial Russian–Indian cooperation." Other international leaders—including former Indonesian president Susilo Bambang Yudhoyono, Singaporean Prime Minister Lee Hsien Loong, President of the United Arab Emirates Sheikh Khalifa bin Zayed Al Nahyan, and vice-president and Prime Minister of the United Arab Emirates and emir of Dubai Sheikh Mohammed bin Rashid Al Maktoum—also paid tribute to Kalam.
- United Nations: In a special gesture, Secretary-General of the United Nations Ban Ki-moon visited the Permanent Mission of India to the UN and signed a condolence book. "The outpouring of grief around the world is a testament of the respect and inspiration he has garnered during and after his presidency. The UN joins the people of India in sending our deepest condolences for this great statesman. May he rest in peace and eternity", Ban wrote in his message.

== Memorial ==
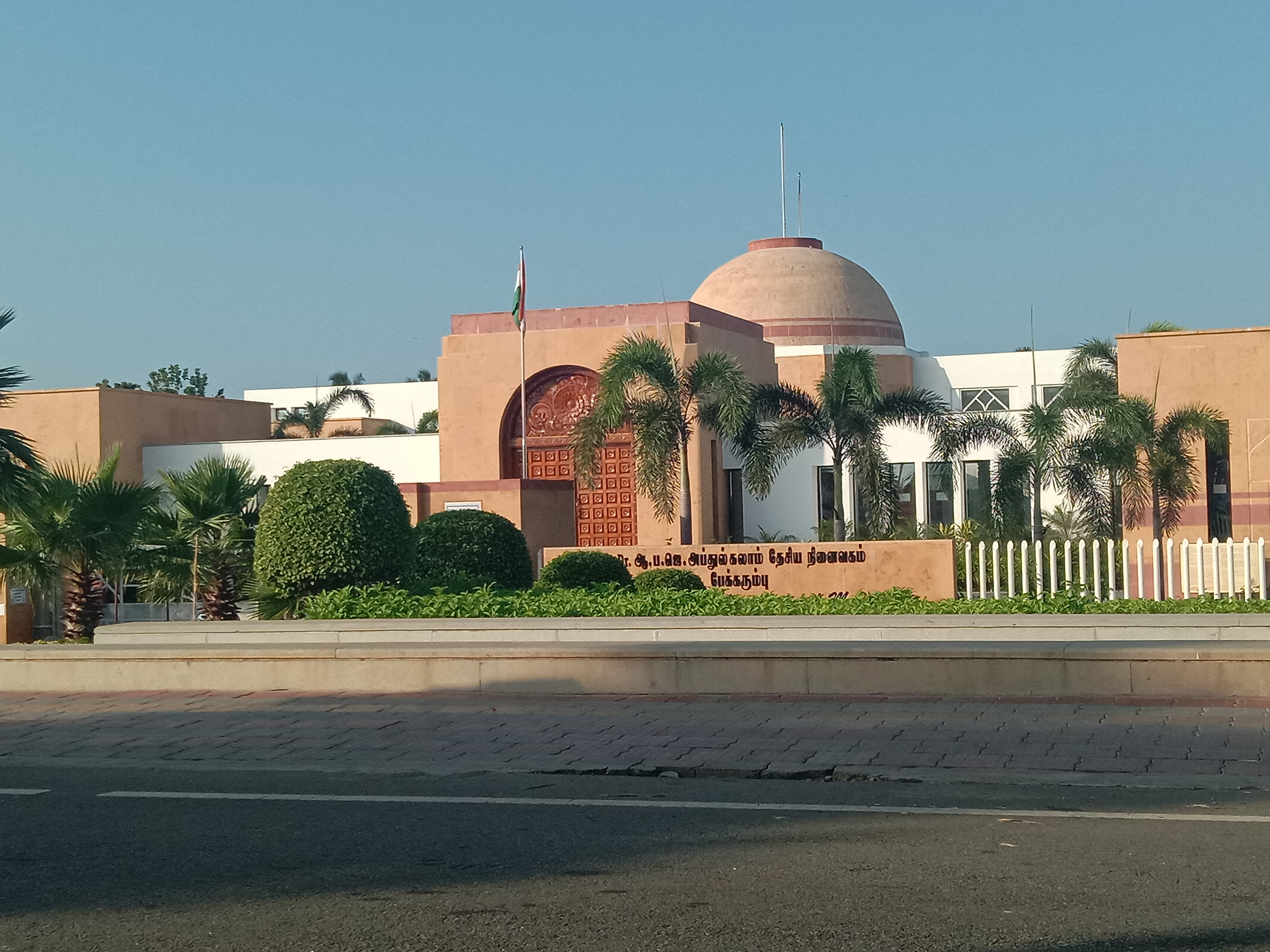
Dr. A. P. J. Abdul Kalam Memorial, Rameswaram

The Dr. A. P. J. Abdul Kalam Memorial was built in memory of Kalam by the DRDO in Pei Karumbu, in the island town of Rameswaram, Tamil Nadu. It was inaugurated by Prime Minister Narendra Modi in July 2017. On display are the replicas of rockets and missiles which Kalam had worked with. Acrylic paintings about his life are also displayed along with hundreds of portraits depicting the life of the mass leader. There is a statue of Kalam in the entrance showing him playing the Veena. There are two other smaller statues of the leader in sitting and standing posture.

== See also ==
- Presidency of A. P. J. Abdul Kalam
- List of things named after A. P. J. Abdul Kalam
- List of awards and honours received by A. P. J. Abdul Kalam
