= Rangila Rasul =

1924 book by an Indian author

- Author: Pandit M. A. Chamupati
- Language: Urdu
- Subject: Muhammad, Muhammad's wives, Criticism of Muhammad
- Genre: Nonfiction, Religious satire
- Publisher: Mahashe Rajpal (Rajpal & Sons)
- Publication date: May 1924
- Publication place: British India
- Media type: Print
- Pages: 58

Rangila Rasul or Rangeela Rasool (transl. Colourful Prophet) is a book published anonymously in Urdu in 1924.

The book was considered highly controversial due to its satire of the marital life of the Islamic prophet Muhammad. Its publication led to reforms in India's penal code that made blasphemy illegal and may have contributed to promote the partition of India.

== Background ==
In the decade of 1920, the British Raj experienced episodes of violence between the Muslim and Hindu communities.

In 1921 and 1922, there was the Malabar rebellion, also known as the Mopla or Mappila rebellion, as the Malabar Muslims are known.

The Muslims of Malabar rebelled against the British authorities, while simultaneously engaging in pogroms targeting Malabari Hindu communities due to religious sentiments. Native Hindu communities suffered from massacres, and fled for fear of death or forced conversions at the hands of the Mappilas.

Between April and September 1927 there were at least 25 riots spread across Mumbai, Punjab, Bengal, Bihar, Odisha and other regions, leaving over a hundred dead (103) and over a thousand injured (1084).

In the Punjab region, these hostilities were accompanied by texts published by members of a religious community with the intention of criticizing or offending other religious communities.

Rangila Rasul was published by members of the Hindu community in response to a pamphlet entitled "Sitaka Chinala" published by members of the Muslim community and that depicted the Hindu goddess Sita (wife of Rama, the hero of the Ramayana) as a prostitute.

== Publication ==
Rangila Rasul was published in May 1924 and its copies sold out in a matter of a few weeks.

Originally published in Urdu and later translated into Hindi, it was written by a member of the Hindu reformist Arya Samaj sect by the name of Pandit Chamupati (or Champovati).

=== The Publisher ===
Its publisher was Mahashe Rajpal (also known as Mahashay), a journalist who founded his publishing house 'Rajpal & Sons' in 1912. Rajpal published the book anonymously, without disclosing or making public the name of the author (Chamupati) despite public pressure and threats, for which Rajpal bore the subsequent legal consequences.

As a publisher Rajpal became recognized in various social circles in Lahore, as he was committed to freedom of expression and did not shy from controversial issues, even publishing a Hindi translation of Marie Stopes "Married Love" in 1925 under the title of "Vivahit Prem" and an illustrated text on family planning and contraception in 1926, both written by B. A. Santram, a scholar and social reformer member of the labor caste.

== Content ==
The book deals with the marriages of Muhammad and his predisposition to take wives.

Being a satire, Rangila Rasul had a surface appearance of a lyrical and laudatory work on Muhammad and his teachings, while the marital life of the prophet is treated in a praising tone, in the style of a bhakti (that is, a show of devotion to a god or saint in the Hindu tradition), and some of the controversial points of the book are in fact faithful to what the Islamic tradition indicates about the life of Muhammad. This was because the author was familiar with Islamic literature.

In one part, the author cites characteristics of the prophet, highlighting his ability to marry, which included "a widow, a virgin, an old woman, a young woman... even a budding girl", and insists on how the active sexuality of marriage is more compatible with the common man in contrast with lifelong celibacy of Hindu saints or the asceticism of other prophets. In fact, the text opens with the following lines:

A calamity's to be averted: he weds her;
An unkindled lamp’s to be lit: he weds her.
One's beauty appeals: he weds her;
Another has treasure: he weds her.
As the nightingale serves the flowers in the garden;
I devote myself to the Colourful Prophet.

— Rangila Rasul, 1924.

The Bengali daily Amrita Bazar Patrika referred the book as follows:

"The book 'R. Rasul' which is the subject of the case is a small brochure written by some anonymous but well-informed author who has tried to draw instances from the life of the Prophet. Those who have read the book know that there is no attempt at ridiculing and the facts put forward in simple and innocent language are entirely based on the writings of standard authors on Islam - both European and Muhammedan."

— Amrita Bazar Patrika.

== Reactions ==
=== Response ===
The allegations of Rangila Rasul were addressed by the Muslim Qazi Maulana Sanaullah Amritsari in his book Muqaddas Rasool (The Holy Prophet).

=== Condemnation by Mahatma Gandhi ===
In June 1924, Mahatma Gandhi referred to Rangila Rasul in his weekly Young India. In his article Gandhi noted that:

"A friend has sent me a pamphlet called R. Rasul written in Urdu, The author's name is not given. [...] The very title is highly offensive. The contents [are] in keeping with the title. I cannot without giving offence to the reader's sense of fine give the translation of some of the extracts. I have asked myself what the motive possible could be in writing or printing such a book except to inflame passion. Abuse and caricature of the Prophet cannot wean a Musalman from his faith and it can do no good to a Hindu who may have doubts about his own belief. As a contribution, therefore, to the religious propaganda work, it has no value whatsoever."

— Mahatma Gandhi in Young India, June 1924.

=== Lawsuit against the publisher ===
Following the publication of Rangila Rasul and its subsequent controversy, the Punjab government stated its intentions to stop the distribution of the book and prevent further publication. Later the publisher, Mahashe Rajpal, received several legal demands. It eventually became clear that the Punjab government had no intention of escalating the controversy over the publication of the book, and when the Punjab Legislative Council discussed the case (at about the same time that the trial of the lawsuits against the publisher Rajpal started), concluded that:

The book [...] contained language which was open to objection, it was [however] decided not to prosecute as there was no ground for thinking that the book had attracted any general attraction.

— Official report of the Legislative Council, 1924.

On May 4, 1927, Justice Dali Singh of the Punjab High Court in Lahore acquitted Rajpal of the charges, but personally condemned the book as "malicious in tone" and its propensity to offend religious sensibilities of the Muslim community. The finding of innocence earned Judge Singh severe criticism and threats. In response to the finding of innocence, a mass gathering of Muslims was held in early July in front of the Jama Masjid in Delhi, which was preceded by the activist, journalist and politician Maulana Mohammad Ali. Of the event the Hindustan Times reported:

The vast gathering of Muslims declares to the Government with one voice that it should immediately shut down the door now open for the destruction of law and order, "by having the judgement immediately revised." Any further delay in the matter will be an indicator that Government wants to compel the Muslamans to take the law in their hands and such matters like this will precipitate a catastrophe which no forces on earth will be able to check.

— Hindustan Times, July 2, 1927.

Due to social tensions, the legal case against Rangila Rasul's publisher was taken up by a Lahore magisterial court, and this time the verdict was guilty, with a sentence of 6 months in prison. However, the ruling was appealed and Judge Singh took up the case a second time, concluding that while the malicious nature of the pamphlet was a fact, it was difficult for him to proceed as there was no law against insult on religious prophets, leaving Rajpal free in 1928.

=== Violence ===
==== Unrest ====
Tensions between Muslims and Hindus in the city of Lahore in the summer of 1927 were greatly fueled by the publication of Rangila Rasul and Sair-e-Dozakh ("A Walk Through the Hell", an article critical of Islam published in a magazine called Risala-i-Vartman), and this eventually erupted into riots that left several dead. In fact, in Punjab the publication of Rangila Rasul facilitated social tensions for up to 6–7 years.

==== Publisher murdered ====
Rangila Rasul's editor, Mahashe Rajpal, suffered an assassination attempt in 1926. Although he survived, he was hospitalized for 3 months. Some extremist Muslim individuals, however, continued to try to take Rajpal's life and in 1927 there was another assassination attempt, but the assassin attacked a different person whom he mistook for Rajpal. Like Rajpal, the victim also survived. Ultimately, Rajpal was assassinated in Lahore on April 6, 1929, when a Muslim carpenter named Ilm-ud-Din (also known as Alimuddin), who was barely 20 years old, stabbed Rajpal while he was outside his business.

==== Trial of Ilm-ud-Din ====
Ilm-ud-Din was tried, found guilty and sentenced to death. His defence lawyer obtained an appeal before the Punjab High Court of Justice in Lahore, and to present his arguments he asked for help from Muhammad Ali Jinnah. Jinnah accepted and presented two arguments:

1. Questioning the evidence presented by the court.
2. Arguing that the punishment was excessive given the age of the killer.

However, Ilm-ud-Din's verdict was not overturned and the sentence was carried out on 31 October 1929.

==== Ilm-ud-Din's Exaltation ====
Some Muslim fundamentalist groups gave Rajpal's killer the title of "Ghazi", which means "Warrior of the Faith". Recognition of the killer reached such a point that a TV movie about his actions was eventually produced in Pakistan.

==== Condemnation by Mahatma Gandhi ====
On April 18, 1929, Gandhi published an article in his weekly "Youth India" under the title "The Bomb and the Knife" in which he compared the knife from the assassination of Mahashay Rajpal with the bombs from the revolutionary act (planned not to injure anyone) against the Legislative Assembly in Delhi on April 8, 1929, by Bhagat Singh and Batukeshwar Dutt (notable members of the pro-independence Hindustan Socialist Republican Association), given the use of force and violence in both cases. Gandhi declared that both acts (the bombs thrown at the Legislative Assembly and the assassination of publisher Rajpal) followed the "same philosophy of mad revenge and impotent rage."

==== Rajpal's Posthumous Recognition ====
Nearly 80 years after his death, in 1997, Rajpal was posthumously recognized by the Federation of Indian Publishers with the Freedom to Publish Award, at the Delhi Book Fair.

In 2010, Rajpal received another posthumous recognition: The special prize Dare to Publish Award from the International Publishers Association.

=== Censorship ===
The book remains banned in India, Pakistan and Bangladesh given their penal codes. Physical copies of the book are hard to find.

==== In India ====
Given the controversy over the ruling that acquitted the editor (Rajpal) of Rangila Rasul, the government tried to show a stronger hand with a similar case that followed shortly after, with another publication critical of Islam in a magazine called Risala-i-Vartman. However, the new trial was not enough, and it was decided that the Imperial Legislative Council (colonial predecessor of the current Parliament of India) would analyse a possible reform of the criminal law.

The result was the Penal Code Amendment Act XXV of India in 1927, which led to the current section 295A of the Indian Penal Code that is in use today, which states:

295A. Deliberate and malicious acts, intended to outrage religious feelings of any class by insulting its religion or religious beliefs. —Whoever, with deliberate and malicious intention of outraging the religious feelings of any class of (citizens of India), (by words, either spoken or written, or by signs or by visible representations or otherwise), insults or attempts to insult the religion or the religious beliefs of that class, shall be punished with imprisonment of either description for a term which may extend to [three years], or with fine, or with both.

— Indian Penal Code. XV Of Offences Relating to Religion.

==== In Pakistan ====
The penal reform passed by the Imperial Legislative Council of British India was also inherited in section 295A of the Pakistan Penal Code after the partition.

During the government of General Muhammad Zia-ul-Haq (1978 - 1988), Pakistan further extended the criminalization of blasphemy by introducing sections 295B and 295C in its penal code, as well as new sections to other similar laws, namely:

- 298 A: Introduced in 1980, criminalises direct or indirect desecration of wives and relatives of Muhammad.
- 298 B: Introduced in 1984, it criminalises terms used by the Ahmadiyya Muslim minority with imprisonment.
- 298 C: Introduced in 1984, it criminalises Muslim members of the Ahmadiyya minority who call themselves "Muslims" and preach or propagatie their version of Islam.
- 295 B: Introduced in 1982, it criminalises the desecration of the Quran. It was introduced as a reaction to a period of social panic over reports of alleged desecration of the Quran in the media.
- 295 C: Introduced in 1986, it criminalises with life imprisonment or the death penalty any direct or indirect desecration of Muhammad.

While some of the norms are open discrimination (against the minority Ahmadis), others discriminate indirectly, since although 295A in theory covers all religions from possible profanation, the new sections 295B and 295C (introduced in 1982 and 1986 respectively), as well as 298A; give preferential protection to Islam.

== See also ==
- Criticism of Muhammad
- Blasphemy in India
- Blasphemy in Pakistan
- List of books banned in India
- Religious violence in India

== Bibliography ==
- Ambedkar, Bhimrao Ramji (2015). Thoughts On Pakistan (Google Books). OCLC 5167934.
- Assad, Ahmed (31 October 2018). "A brief history of the anti-blasphemy laws". Karachi: Herald (Pakistan). Dawn Media Group.
- Gupta, Amit Kumar (1997). "Defying Death: Nationalist Revolutionism in India, 1897-1938". Social Scientist. 25 (9): 3–27. doi:10.2307/3517678. JSTOR 20488099.
- Gupta, Charu (4 December 2020). Routledge (ed.). "Vernacular Sexology from the Margins: A Woman and a Shudr". South Asia: Journal of South Asian Studies. 43 (6). London: 1105–1127. doi:10.1080/00856401.2020.1824426. S2CID 230639716.
- Hardgrave, Robert L. (1997) [February 1977]. "The Mappilla Rebellion, 1921: Peasant Revolt in Malabar" (PDF). Modern Asian Studies. 11 (1). Cambridge University Press: 57–99. doi:10.1017/S0026749X00013226. hdl:2152/24252. JSTOR 20488099. S2CID 145692085.
- Kumar, Girja (1 September 1997). "R. Rasul and its aftermath". The Book on Trial: Fundamentalism and Censorship in India (Google Books) (First ed.). Har Anand Publications. pp. 47–60. ISBN 8124105251.
- Nair, Neeti (7 August 2013). "Beyond the 'Communal' 1920s: The Problem of Intention, Legislative Pragmatism, and the Making of Section 295A of the Indian Penal Code". The Indian Economic & Social History Review. 50 (3). Thousand Oaks, California: SAGE Publishing: 317–340. doi:10.1177/0019464613494622. S2CID 144068997.
- Nair, Netii (1 May 2009). "Bhagat Singh as 'Satyagrahi': The Limits to Non-Violence in Late Colonial India". Modern Asian Studies. 43 (3). Cambridge: Cambridge University Press: 649–681. doi:10.1017/s0026749X08003491. JSTOR 20488099. S2CID 143725577.
- Pande, Ishita (November 2017) [14 October 2014]. "Loving Like a Man: The Colourful Prophet, Conjugal Masculinity and the Politics of Hindu Sexology in Late Colonial India" (PDF). Gender & History. 29 (3). Hoboken, New Jersey: John Wiley & Sons: 675–692. doi:10.1111/1468-0424.12322. S2CID 148812554 – via Google Scholar.
- Rajpal & Sons (2019). "About Us". Delhi: Rajpal & Sons. Archived from the original on 15 July 2023.
- Spruijt, Herman P. (26 November 2010). "IPA's Special Award 'Dare to Publish' to late Shri Rajpal" (PDF) (Press release). Geneva: International Publishers Association. Archived from the original (PDF) on 15 July 2023.
- Dr. Zuhur, Sherifa D.; LTCDR Aboul-Enein, Youssef H. (October 2004). Islamic Rulings on Warfare (PDF). United States Army War College Press. ISBN 1-58487-177-6.
- Imperial Legislative Council (1927). "XV Of offences relating to religion". The Indian Penal Code (PDF). Delhi.
