= Target 3 Billion =

Target 3 Billions
- Author: A. P. J. Abdul Kalam and Srijan Pal Singh
- Language: English
- Subject: Economy of India
- Publisher: Penguin Books
- Publication date: 15-Dec-2011
- Publication place: India
- ISBN: 978-0-14-341730-9

Target 3 Billion is a book by the former President of India, A. P. J. Abdul Kalam, and Srijan Pal Singh. The book highlights the issues prevailing in rural India and suggests measures to improve standards of living. It focuses on the inclusive development project called PURA (Providing Urban Amenities in Rural Areas). The book plans to improve the standard of living amongst the poor rural population through voluntary campaigns such as community's participation and entrepreneurship.

It cites the work of Fabio Rosa who helped in changing the structure of Palmares, a rural district in Brazil, by rural electrification. The access to water and electricity and better agricultural methods had led to prosperity in the region. Further, it describes Magarpatta, the organisation of Magarpatta city, which now provides home to over 35,000 people and the development of an IT park.
