= Dr. A. P. J. Abdul Kalam Memorial =

Memorial dedicated to A. P. J. Abdul Kalam in Rameswaram, Tamil Nadu, India

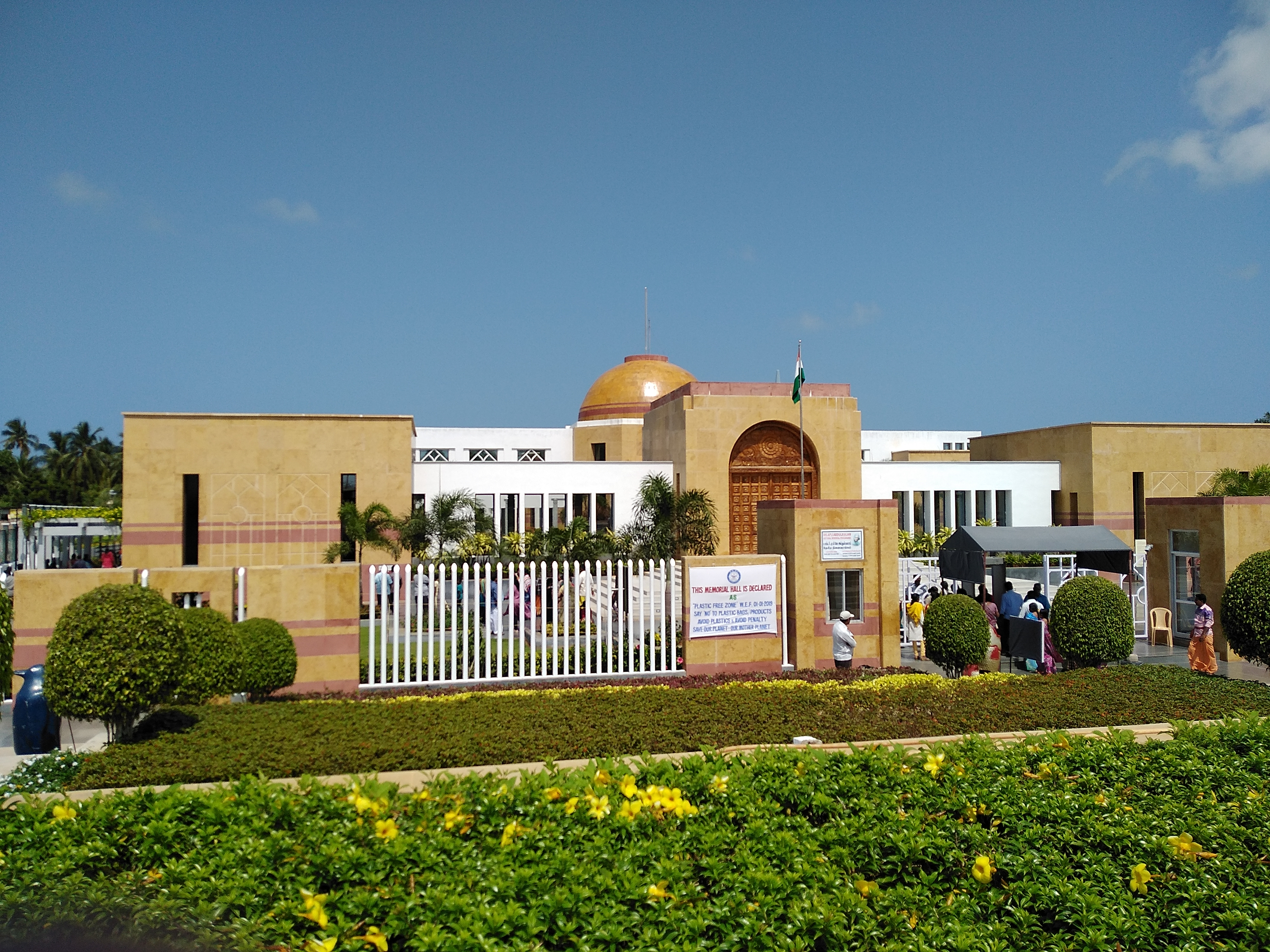
- Kalam's Mausoleum
- Interactive map of Dr. A. P. J. Abdul Kalam Memorial
- Location: Rameswaram, Tamil Nadu, India
- Designer: Central Public Works Department; Defence Research and Development Organisation
- Type: Mughal architecture Ancient Indian architecture
- Material: Cement, Iron, marble, and granite
- Opening date: 22 July 2017
- Dedicated to: A. P. J. Abdul Kalam
- Website: Full details at Kalam Memorial. Rameswaram Tourism, website

Dr. A. P. J. Abdul Kalam Memorial is a memorial dedicated to the former president of the Republic of India A. P. J. Abdul Kalam located in Peikarumbu, Rameswaram, Tamil Nadu, India. The memorial was designed and constructed by the Defence Research and Development Organisation (DRDO) as a tribute to Kalam and to display the cultural heritage and ethnic diversity of India. It was officially inaugurated by the prime minister of the Republic of India Narendra Modi on 22 July 2017. A symbol of national integration, the memorial is an amalgamation of Mughal and Indian architecture.

== Background ==
Dr. Kalam died on 27 July 2015, Dr. Kalam travelled to Shillong to deliver a lecture on "Creating a Livable Planet Earth" at the Indian Institute of Management Shillong. The lecture was supposed to be 4000 words, but only after speaking the initial two sentences, Dr. Kalam collapsed and he was confirmed dead of a sudden cardiac arrest later at a hospital. Dr. Kalam's body was airlifted in an Indian Air Force helicopter from Shillong to Guwahati, from where it was flown to New Delhi on the morning of 28 July.

Following Dr. Kalam's death, the Indian Minister of Home Affairs called an emergency meeting of the Union Council of Ministers, attended by Prime Minister of India Narendra Modi. In the meeting, a proposal to build the "Dr. A. P. J. Abdul Kalam National Memorial" was finalised. The Indian Government proposed to perform Dr. Kalam's funeral service at Raj Ghat-(Ekta Sthal) in New Delhi, and build a memorial there. Dr. Kalam's family objected, since Dr. Kalam had wanted to be buried in his hometown, Rameswaram, and the Indian government agreed to go along with the family's wishes, and in the same year on Dr. Kalam's birth date which is on 15 October, the commencement of construction on a memorial at Rameswaram was publicized by Prime Minister Narendra Modi. On 27 July 2017, on the occasion of Dr. Kalam's second death anniversary, the memorial was inaugurated by Prime Minister Narendra Modi.

== Structure, architecture, and landscape ==
The Defence Research and Development Organisation (DRDO) initiate to design and building of the memorial, and in December 2015 the construction was started. In July 2016 Defence Minister Manohar Parrikar officially laid the foundation stone on the occasion of the first anniversary of Kalam's death. The construction was completed within one year, with the engagement of 500 workers, and sometimes the work was carried out around the clock. The work was supervised by DRDO's chief construction engineers; Colonel B. Choubey and Colonel B. K Singh.

The memorial covers 2.11 acres of land, the built-up area is 1,425 square meters, and the construction cost up to 1.2 ₹ billion. The mausoleum is built of granite, marble and reinforced concrete. The construction material was sourced from different parts of India and transported to the construction site; the stone columns are sourced from Bangalore, the stone cladding was designed in Jaisalmer and Agra, wher as the main entrance wooden doors are crafted in Thanjavur and the marble was brought from Karnataka.

With an amalgamation of Mughal and Indian architecture, the memorial is designed in a way to display the cultural heritage and ethnic diversity of India, making it a symbol of national integration. There are three entrances to the structure, of which the main entrance doorway resembles the India Gate of Delhi, while its hallway resembles the Brihadisvara Temple, of Thanjavur, and the wooden doors are designed in Chettinad style. At the northern end of the memorial lies a circular sepulchre that houses Kalam's grave. The main dome resembles one of Rashtrapati Bhavan's central domes and houses a bronze statue of Kalam playing the Veena. The central dome is connected to four display halls of about 2500 square feet—(each hall depicts Kalm's life in phases, and they are designed as children's square, scientist square, motivation square, and lecture square), that house replicas of rockets and missiles, 900 paintings; that include, murals (sourced from Hyderabad, Shanti Niketan, Kolkata and Chennai), Shekhawati paintings, a collection of 200 photographs that highlight his long association with the DRDO, the Indian Space Research Organisation (ISRO), and his involvement with India's civilian space program and military missile development efforts. There are paintings and life-sized sculptures that illustrate Kalam at different ages. A 45-foot tall replica of the Agni missile with a theme of "unity in diversity" is displayed at the forefront of the structure. The memorial features quotes from Kalam as a scientist and the president of India.

The outer precinct around the memorial consists of landscaping, with the plantings sourced from neighboring states of Andhra Pradesh, Karnataka, and Telangana. The landscape is designed in the Mughal garden style, with pergola pathways lined with models of missiles designed by Kalam.

== Gallery ==
Pictures of Kalams memorial

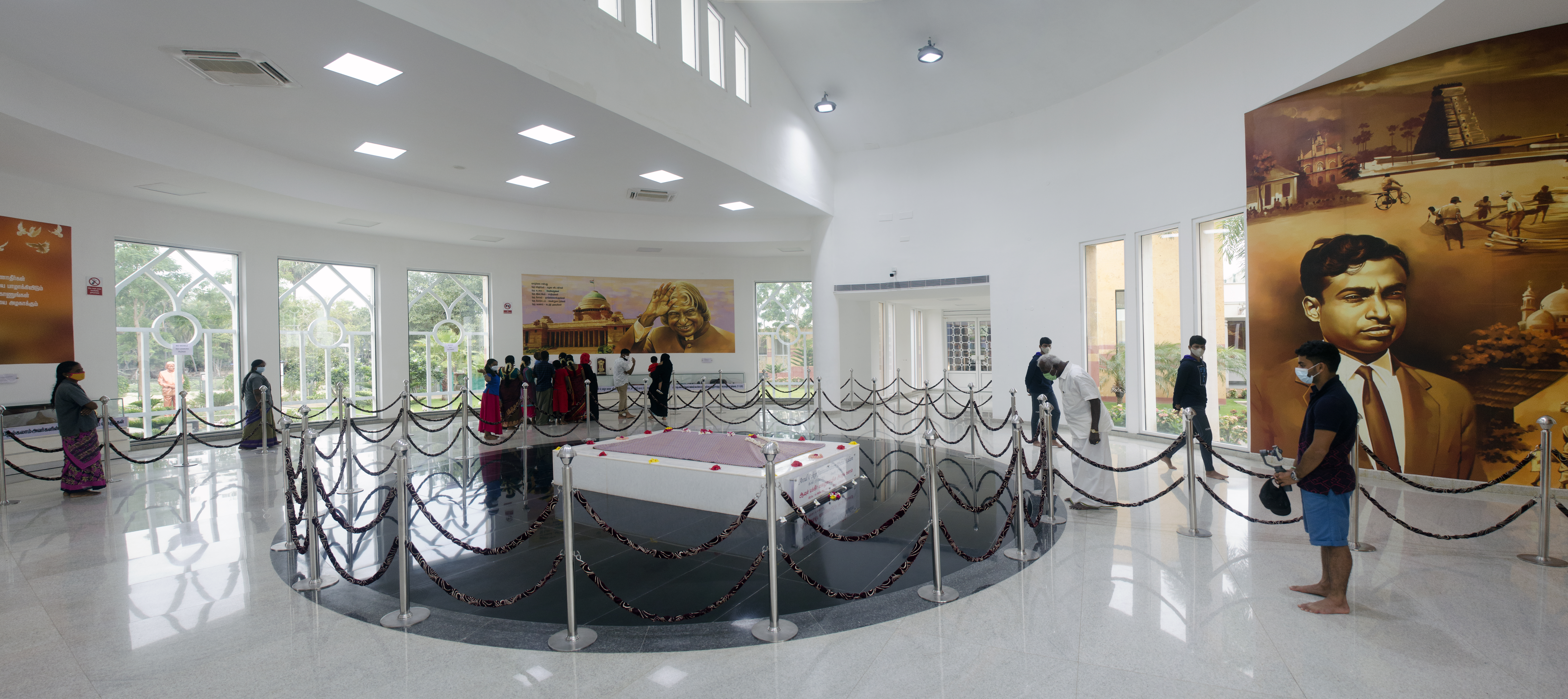
Tomb of Kalam.

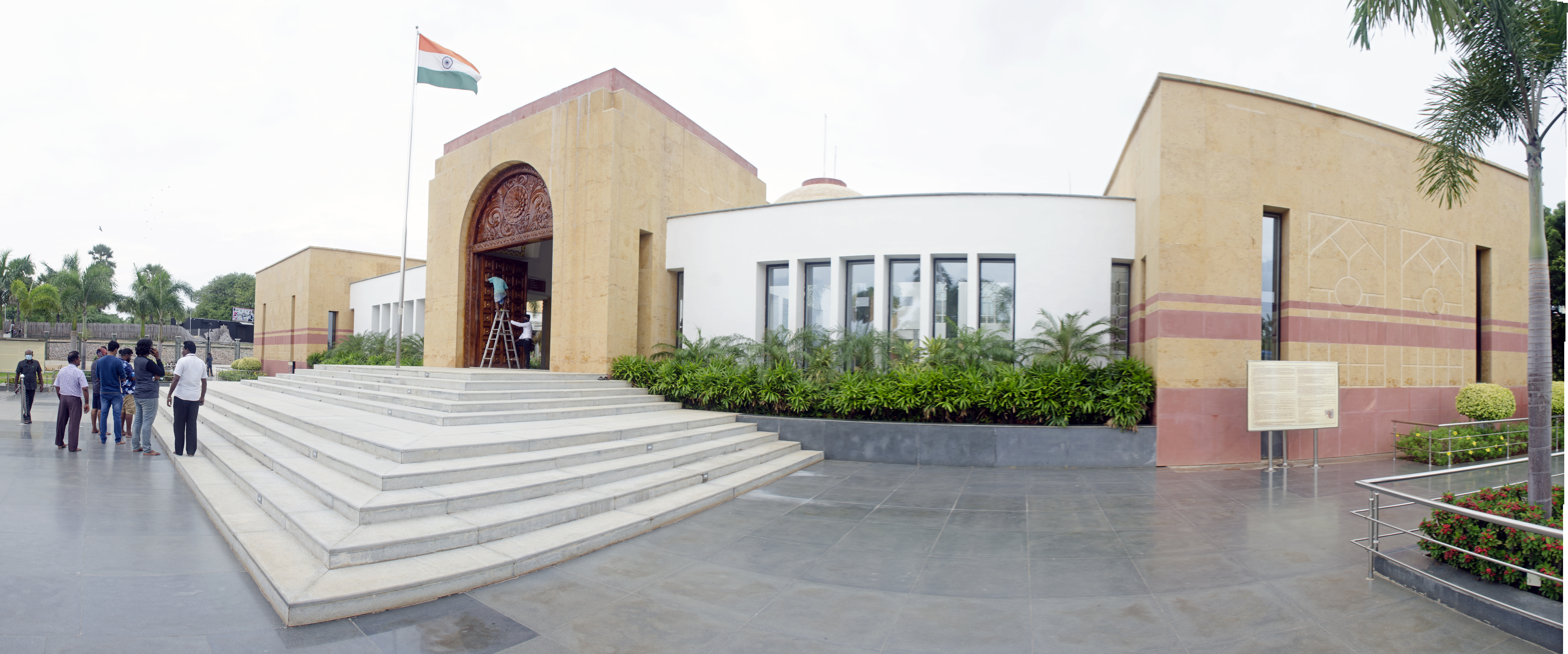
Exterior of Mausoleum.

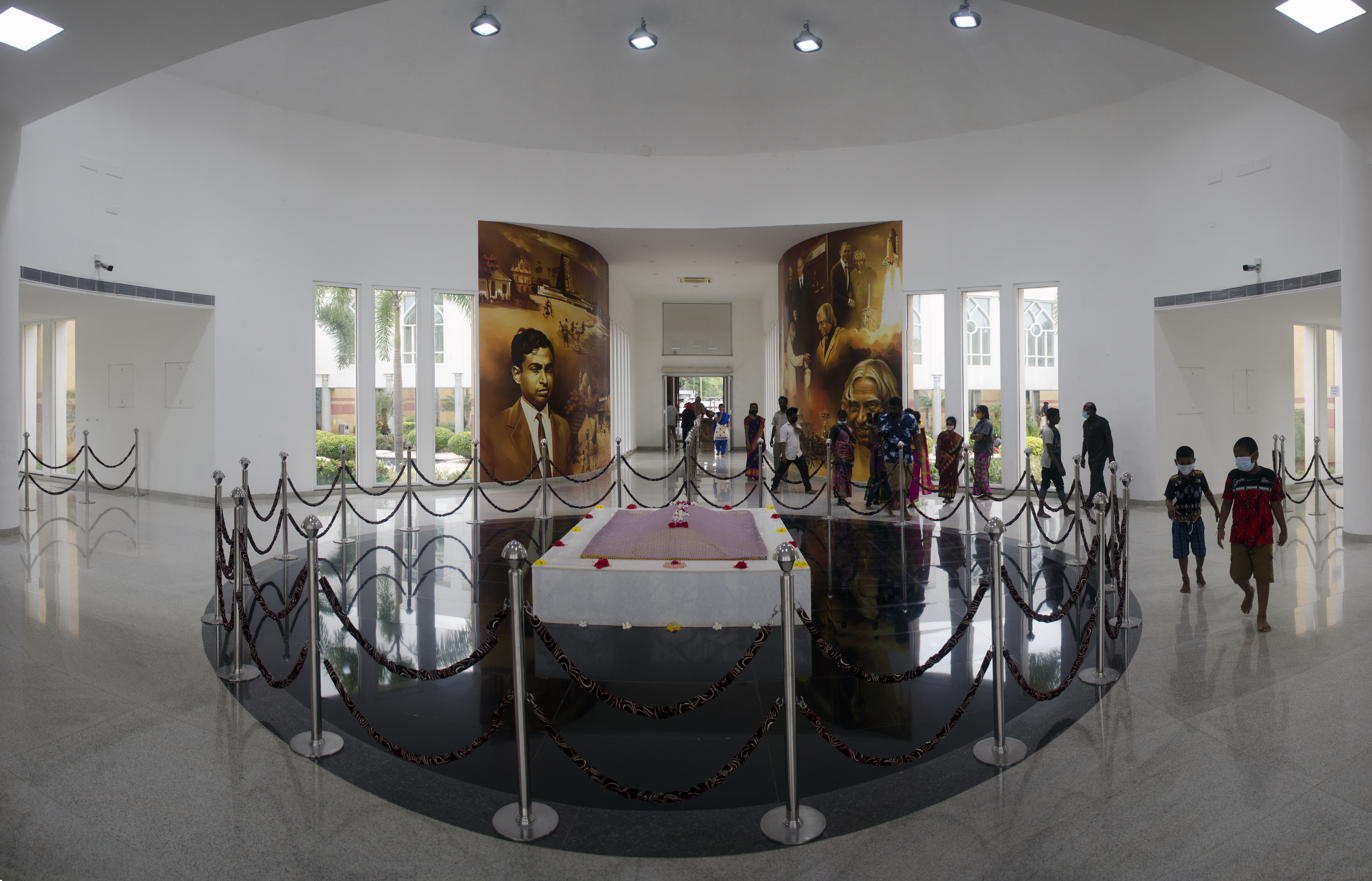
Four display halls connecting to the Central Tomb.

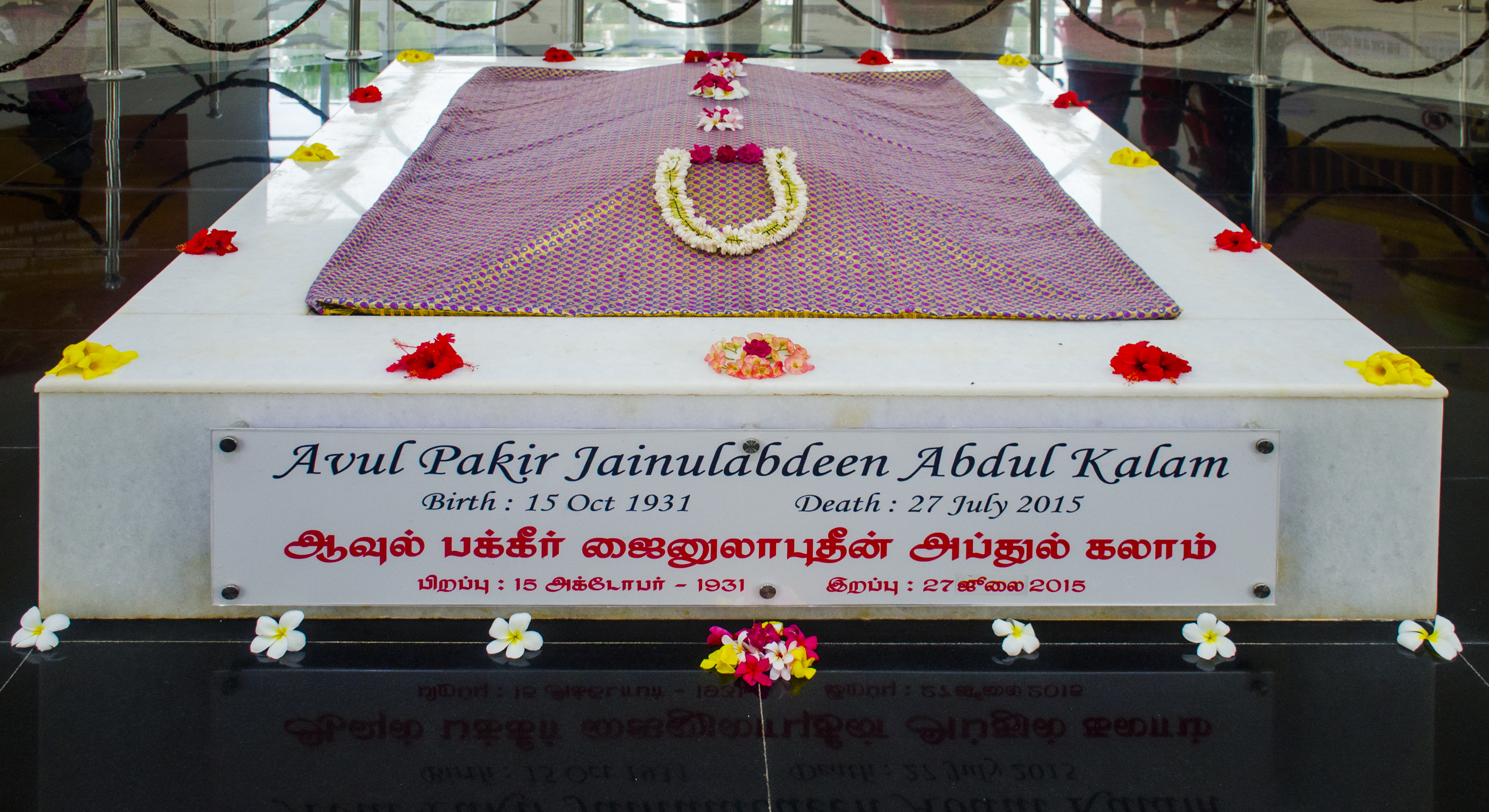
Grave of Kalam.

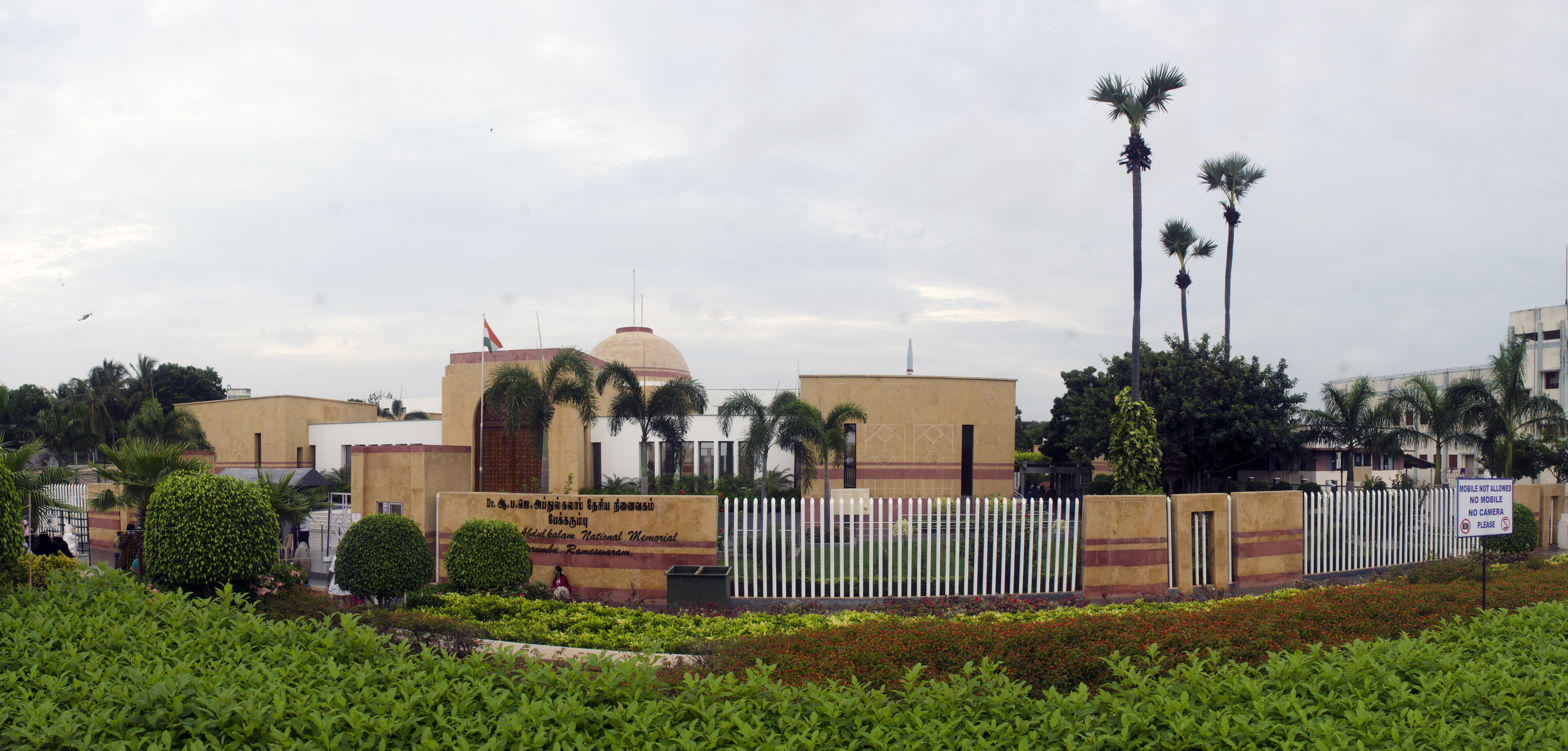
Distant view of Mausoleum.
