= Transcendence: My Spiritual Experiences with Pramukh Swamiji =

2015 book by A. P. J. Abdul Kalam

- Cover of Transcendence: My Spiritual Experiences with Pramukh Swamiji
- Author: A.P.J. Abdul Kalam with Arun Tiwari
- Language: English
- Genre: Non-fiction
- Published: June 2015
- Publisher: HarperCollins India
- Publication place: India
- ISBN: 978-93-5177-405-1

Transcendence: My Spiritual Experiences with Pramukh Swamiji (June 2015) is a book written by A. P. J. Abdul Kalam, the 11th President of India and a pioneering scientist. Co-authored by Professor Arun Tiwari and published by HarperCollins India, the book describes Kalam's spiritual experiences with and reflections on Pramukh Swami Maharaj, the guru and spiritual leader of the BAPS Hindu organization. Kalam recounted the spiritual transformation he experienced during his fourteen-year association with Pramukh Swami, described the inspiration he obtained from Pramukh Swami's leadership of BAPS, and expressed his vision for a society in which science and spirituality are fused. Kalam stated that he saw in Pramukh Swami "a true embodiment of transcendence," and titled the book to reflect his belief that Pramukh Swami is gunatit, a term signifying transcendence of ephemeral qualities and the modes of nature.

== Authors ==
After training as an aeronautical engineer, A. P. J. Abdul Kalam worked at India's Defense Research and Development Organization and the Indian Space Research Organization as a rocket scientist who was responsible for India's first Satellite Launch Vehicle and India's ballistic missile systems. He was later appointed the principal scientific adviser to the government of India, with the rank of cabinet minister. In 1997, he received India's highest civilian award, the Bharat Ratna, and in 2002 he became the eleventh President of India. He is widely acknowledged as the most popular President in Indian history.

Kalam had often expressed that he was proud of being an Indian Muslim. During his childhood, his father, A P Jainulabdeen, an imam in a mosque in the South Indian town of Rameshwaram, would have tea every evening with the heads of the town's main Hindu temple and Christian church and discuss local issues. Kalam wrote how this secular mindset broadened his thinking, inspiring him to seek out truth without being hindered by mundane boundaries. This helped lead him to choose Pramukh Swami, the Hindu head of the BAPS Swaminarayan Sampradaya as his guru, with whom he enjoyed a close relationship for the last fourteen years of his life. Just a month after this book was released, Kalam died of cardiac arrest on 27 July 2015 at the age of 83.

The co-author of the book, Arun Tiwari, had been working under Kalam since 1982, first as a missile scientist at the Defense Research and Development Laboratory and then as the program director of a defense technology spin-off. In 1999, Tiwari co-wrote Kalam's autobiography, Wings of Fire, which has become a modern classic, selling more than a million copies in eighteen languages. Since then, Tiwari has written twelve books, with this, his latest book, having taken him about a year to write together with Kalam. Tiwari is also an adjunct professor in the School of Management Sciences, University of Hyderabad.

== Background ==
The first of eight meetings between Kalam and Pramukh Swami took place on 30 June 2001 at Gujarat Vihar in New Delhi. Kalam and Pramukh Swami struck an instant bond of friendship and spiritual rapport. Kalam commented that he was drawn to Pramukh Swami's simplicity and spiritual purity. After meeting with Pramukh Swami, Kalam reflected on Saint Thiruvalluvar's teaching that when one is burdened by an issue, sitting in the presence of great divinity will free one from these worries. He revealed that he had experienced such a feeling in the presence of Pramukh Swami. Kalam was inspired by Pramukh Swami throughout their numerous interactions. He cites one specific incident, which galvanized him to write the book. The incident occurred on the day following the terrorist attack on the Akshardham, Gandhinagar complex in September 2002. Kalam was moved by Pramukh Swami's equanimity in the aftermath of the attack. Pramukh Swami prayed for and sprinkled holy water upon the sites of all of the deceased, including the terrorists, thus displaying to the world that all human life is sacred. Kalam's resolve to write the book was further strengthened in 2005 during the inauguration of the Swaminarayan Akshardham in New Delhi.

Kalam expressed that he wrote the book in order to record his experiences and reflections on Pramukh Swami and his work, and the transformation he experienced whilst in Pramukh Swami's fellowship. The book discusses the correlation between science and spirituality. Kalam stated that he observed Pramukh Swami's life for fourteen years and worked for two years on writing the book along with co-author Professor Arun Tiwari. Tiwari described the book's central message as being centered on purity and integrity.

Kalam and Tiwari discussed that they titled the book Transcendence to reflect their belief that Pramukh Swami transcends the ephemeral and the modes of nature. Tiwari, recalls, "Whatever name we thought, we were trying to match it with Pramukh Swamiji. So, we arrived at Transcendence, which is gunatit. After all, one translation of transcendence is gunatit. Somebody who is beyond guna – that is Pramukh Swamiji. So, that gunatit we translated to transcendence."

== Contents ==
The book comprises thirty-two chapters, equally divided into four major sections, and an epilogue. The first section describes Kalam's spiritual experiences with Pramukh Swami Maharaj. The second section highlights notable works of BAPS. The third section advocates for a fusion between science and spirituality, and highlights the examples of leading scientists in history who also held spiritual beliefs. The fourth section reflects on the ideals of creative leadership.

=== Part 1 "Experiencing the Presence" – Kalam's interactions with Pramukh Swami Maharaj ===
The first section, entitled "Experiencing the Presence," describes Kalam's spiritual experiences during his interactions with Pramukh Swami between 2001 and 2014.

During these years, Kalam often spoke with Pramukh Swami on the phone and personally met with him on seven occasions. Kalam recalled that upon his first meeting with Pramukh Swami on 30 June 2001, he "felt a strange connection with something that exists in the realm of spirit—the part that is closest to the Divine" and felt he "had acquired a sixth sense." Kalam chronicled how, since that day, many of the problems or conundrums he faced while in office were resolved with the blessings of Pramukh Swami. For example, Kalam discussed his "Vision 2020" plan for India with Pramukh Swami, who suggested, "Along with your five ideas to transform India add a sixth one—faith in God."

This section includes eight chapters, titled: (1) Lead India; (2) You Are Not Who You Think You Are; (3) Peace Grows When It Is Shared; (4) Children Are Everyone's Future; (5) The Confidence That We Can Do It; (6) Self-Discipline Is the True Path to Dharma; (7) Nothing Less Than God's Best in Our Lives; and (8) Change Alone is Eternal, Perpetual, Immortal.

=== Part 2 "Spirituality in Action" – Kalam's observations about BAPS ===
The second section, entitled "Spirituality in Action," includes Kalam's observations regarding the activities and accomplishments of BAPS, the global religious and civic organization within the Swaminarayan branch of Hinduism, under Pramukh Swami's stewardship. Pramukh Swami is the guru and spiritual leader of BAPS.

Kalam studied the history of BAPS, and narrated how the organization has grown to become "a spiritual force connecting millions of people [in India] and abroad." Kalam describes BAPS mandirs, or traditional places of worship, and the two Akshardham complexes in Delhi and Gandhinagar, India as the "sanctuaries of pious and virtuous living." Kalam noted that a key lesson taught by BAPS is to "remove I and me. Ego will vanish. If ego vanishes hatred will vanish. If hatred vanishes, peace will come."

The book's co-author, Professor Arun Tiwari, also notes that BAPS' achievements include reconciling communities in conflict, engaging in anti-addiction public campaigns, and promoting intra-household spiritual meetings, called ghar sabhas. According to Professor Tiwari, BAPS' activities are "very revolutionary and, in sociological terms, I do not see any parallel."

This section includes eight chapters, titled: (9) Portal to the Unseen; (10) Warriors of the Light; (11) The Doctor of the Soul; (12) A Status Without Parallel; (13) From Within I Rise; (14) Walking Over the Waves; (15) Living in the Witness of God; and (16) To Give and Forgive Is Divine.

=== Part 3 "Fusion of Science and Spirituality" ===
The third section, entitled "Fusion of Science and Spirituality," describes the relationship between science and spirituality as expressed by preeminent thinkers and scientists, including Pythagoras, Galileo Galilei, Albert Einstein, Gregor Mendel, Baruch Spinoza, Srinivas Ramanujan, Jagdish Chandra Bose, Subrahmanyan Chandrasekhar, and Francis Collins. As Kalam expressed, the vision of a fusion between science and spirituality "shows the way ahead for humanity." In Kalam's view, science has advanced and provided much to humanity, but spirituality is also an essential component of human life. The book's co-author, Professor Arun Tiwari, has similarly stated, "Looking at science and spirituality as two separate processes is a big mistake. I think both are the same. Both are two faces of the same coin."

This section includes eight chapters, titled: (17) In Contemplation of the Beauty of Creation; (18) Religions Are the Signposts of God; (19) Mind is the Matrix of All Matter; (20) Growing into Highly Evolved Physical and Spiritual Beings; (21) The Highest Virtue Is the Intellectual Love of God; (22) A Dimension As Vast As Space and As Timeless As Infinity; (23) The Unique Throb of Life in All Creation; and (24) God Is the Source of the Universe.

=== Part 4 "Evolution of Creative Leadership" ===
In the fourth section, entitled "Evolution of Creative Leadership," Kalam shares the lessons on leadership he learned from Pramukh Swami. As co-author Professor Tiwari has described, "If you look at the leadership of Pramukh Swamiji... his management, his leadership I have not seen anywhere." In this section, Kalam enumerates "eight facets of creative leadership, namely—fearlessness, courage, ethical living, non-violence, forgiveness, compassion, vision and cooperation" through the stories of Nachiketa, Abdul Qadir, Abraham Lincoln, Thiruvalluvar, Mahatma Gandhi, Nelson Mandela, the Dalai Lama, Vikram Sarabhai and Verghese Kurien."

This section includes eight chapters, titled: (25) A Fearless Look Into the Face of All Facts; (26) What Prevented You from Prostrating When I Commanded You?; (27) Purity is the Feminine, Truth the Masculine Terms of Divinity; (28) There Is No Such Thing As Defeat in Nonviolence; (29) Forgiveness Forces Us to Grow Beyond What We Are; (30) The Best Name for God Is Compassion; (31) Vision with Action Can Change the World; and (32) The Most Powerful Force on This Planet is Human Cooperation.

== Reception ==
On 26 June 2015, Indian Prime Minister Narendra Modi received a copy of the book from the co-author, publishers and senior swamis of BAPS. Modi, having known and met Pramukh Swami Maharaj over many decades, acknowledged the significance of the work and lauded both its historical and spiritual value. P. K. Lehri Former Chief Secretary, Gujarat, reflecting upon the Ahmedabad book launch, was thrilled by the message of love and peace and wrote, "The book spreads the message of peace and love. It really was a great function and I can say that all of us who attended had never seen or thought that such an atmosphere of goodwill, peace and love for mankind can be created." P.C. Thakur, director general of Police in Gujarat thought the book was a great way of bringing science and spirituality together in the service of humanity as he states, "This a confluence of two great saints—a saint of science, Dr. Kalam, and a saint of spiritual bliss, Pramukh Swamiji. This work inspires love, respect, friendship, compassion and the righteous path of humanity in one's mind".

== Publication ==
The book has been published in hardback by Harper Element, which is an imprint of HarperCollins Publishers India. At the book's Gujarat launch in the Ahmedabad Convention Centre, chief copy editor of HarperCollins India, Shantanu Chaudhuri, explained that this was a "historic book" for HarperCollins, since it was the first time "an ex-President of a nation [was] writing his experiences about a brilliant spiritual leader." Moreover, he marvelled that instead of the eight to ten months it normally takes to publish a book, this book went from manuscript to bound copies in just two months.

He further explained that the hardback original edition of a book in India never goes beyond 5,000 to 10,000 copies in the first print. However, due to the historic nature of this book, the publishers anticipated heavy demand and printed approximately 100,000 copies in its opening print run, which was a record for HarperCollins India.

Before the end of 2015, the publishers have stated that the book will be out in Hindi, Gujarati, Malayalam, Telugu, Marathi, Kannada and Tamil, and that it would likely be published internationally under HarperCollins's US and UK imprint Harper360, making it available in the US and Europe.
