= Puducherry Science Centre & Planetarium =

- Location: Kurinji Nagar, Lawspet, Puducherry-605008
- Coordinates: 11.9310°N 79.7852°E
- Type: Children's Science Museum
- Collection size: Fun Centre, Digital Planetarium, Marine Life, Science Park
- Owners: National Council of Science Museums, Government of India, Government of Puducherry

Puducherry Science Centre & Planetarium (also known as Puducherry Science Park) is a public science planetarium. It is located in Lawspet, India. The centre was designed, developed and set up by the National Council of Science Museums.

The Science Demonstration Corner conducts live demonstrations and experiments to groups of visitors and students. The Children's Corner offers simple experiments for children. A workshop equipped with tools and tackles is provided for maintenance of the exhibits and development of new ones. The capital cost of Rupees 375 Lakhs approximately for this facility was equally shared by the Government of India and Government of Puducherry. The Digital Planetarium's cost was borne by the State. The Science Centre and Planetarium sprawl over a 3-acre land with a built-up area of 1500 m^{2}.

== Marine life ==
The marine life gallery occupies 300 m^{2} divided in five sections Marine Ecology, Marine Diversity, Marine Resources, Threats to Marine Resources and Marine Tourism.

== Fun Science ==
The Fun Science Gallery spreads over an area of approximately 300 m^{2} and includes opportunities for visitors to interact with various aspects of science.

== Science Park ==
Outside, the Science Park covers 1 acre. It features interactive exhibits.

== Digital Planetarium ==
The Digital Planetarium simulates a dynamic view of the sky to inform visitors about astronomy.

== See also ==
- Swami Vivekananda Planetarium, Mangalore
