= Indomitable Spirit =

2006 book by Abdul Kalam

Indomitable Spirit is a 2006 book authored by A. P. J. Abdul Kalam, the former president of India. The cover page of the book says it "brings together the values, thoughts and ideas of President Kalam as reflected in his speeches and addresses. Interspersed with interesting anecdotes and observations, Indomitable Spirit represents the quintessential APJ Abdul Kalam - the man, the scientist, the teacher and the President."

The book begins with reproduction of a sentence from President's address to the nation on the eve of 57th Republic Day: "The basis of all systems, social or political, rests upon the goodness of men. No nation is great or good because parliament enacts this or that, but that its men are great and good." The book ends with these words of Sir C. V. Raman, the Nobel laureate from his address to a group of young graduates in 1969: "I can assert without fear of contradiction that the quality of the Indian mind is equal to the quality of any Teutonic, Nordic or Anglo-Saxon mind. What we lack is perhaps courage, what we lack is perhaps the driving force which takes one anywhere. We have, I think, developed an inferiority complex. I think what is needed in India today is the destruction of that defeatist spirit." The President Kalam winds up the spirit of the Indomitable Spirit from these words of Gurudev Rabindranath Tagore:

Give me the strength never to disown the poor
Or bend my knees before insolent might.
Give me the strength
To raise my head high above daily trifles.
And give me the strength
To surrender my strength to Thy will with love.

== Contents ==
The book consist of 14 chapters - their names and lead lines are indicated below:

Inspiring Lives
Everyone's life is a page in the human history irrespective of the position he or she hold or the work he or she performs.
My Teachers
Give me a child for seven years, afterwards, let the God or the devil take the child, they cannot change the child.
The Mission of Education
When learning is purposeful, creativity blossoms, when creativity blossoms, thinking emanates, when thinking emanates, knowledge is fully lit, when knowledge is lit, economy flourishes.
Creativity and Innovation
An ignited mind is the most powerful resource on earth, above the earth, and under the earth.
Art and Literature
Art is a benign expression of the inner beauty in nature. Be it a cartoon, sculpture or literary composition, it elevates the beautiful spirit of life for everyone to see and enjoy. Such a spirit silently but eloquently conveys the message of love, humour, affection, and peace ..."
Abiding Values
See the flower, how generously it distributes perfume and honey. It gives to all, gives freely of its love and, when its work is done, it falls away quietly. Try to be like the flower, unassuming despite all its qualities.
Science and Spirituality
Science is the best boon that God has bestowed upon mankind. Science with reasoning becomes the capital of society... The convergence of science and technology with spirituality is touted to be the future for both science and technology, and spirituality.
Tomorrow's Citizens
If India has to become developed by 2020, it will do so only by riding on the shoulders of the young.
Empowered Women
When women are empowered, a society with stability is assured. Gone are the days when women were considered subservient or secondary in almost all walks of life compared to men. It has now amply been proved that women are capable of executing any job as efficiently as men, if not more so.
Towards a Knowledge Society
Knowledge has always been the prime mover of prosperity and power. The acquisition of knowledge has been the thrust area throughout the world and sharing the experience of knowledge is a unique culture of our country.
Building a Developed India
We should all create a nation that is one of the best places to live in on this earth and which brings smiles to billion faces.
Enlightened Citizenship
Enlightened citizenship has three components: education with value system, religion transforming into spiritual force, and creating economic prosperity through development.
Creative Leadership
Creative leadership is exercising the task to change the traditional role from commander to coach, from manager to mentor, from director to delegator and from one who demands respect to one who facilitates self-respect.
Indomitable Spirit

A section containing chapter-wise references, 177 in number, complete the book. -John Wawryk
