= Rajpal & Sons =

Indian publishing house in Delhi

- Parent company: Rajpal & Sons
- Status: Active
- Founded: 1912
- Founder: Rajpal Malhotra (more popularly known as Mahashay Rajpal & Mahashe Rajpal)
- Country of origin: India
- Headquarters location: Delhi
- Distribution: Worldwide
- Key people: Meera Johri and Pranav Johri
- Publication types: Hindi, Urdu and English
- No. of employees: More than 50
- Official website: www.rajpalpublishing.com

Rajpal & Sons is an Indian publishing house based in Delhi.

== History ==
Rajpal & Sons was founded in 1912 by Rajpal Malhotra in Lahore. He was assassinated by the Indian Muslim Ilm-ud-Din in 1929 for publishing a book called Rangeela Rasool. The book was considered highly controversial due to its satire of the marital life of the Islamic prophet Muhammad. Its publication led to reforms in India's penal code that made blasphemy illegal.

After Rajpal's killing, his wife and son Vishwanath Malhotra took over the running of the publishing house. In 1947, after the partition of India and Pakistan, the publishing house shifted to New Delhi. The publishing house is now run by Meera Johri and her son Pranav Johri, the third and fourth generation descendants of Rajpal.

== Business profile ==
Seven prime ministers and presidents of India have had their works published by Rajpal & Sons, namely A. P. J. Abdul Kalam, Sarvepalli Radhakrishnan, Benazir Bhutto, Narendra Modi, I. K. Gujral, Atal Bihari Vajpayee and P. V. Narasimha Rao. In the field of classic Hindi literary writing, the works of Harivansh Rai Bachchan, Ramdhari Singh Dinkar, Sachchidananda Vatsyayan, Mahadevi Varma, Amritlal Nagar, Acharya Chatursen Shastri, Vishnu Prabhakar and Kamleshwar have been published by Rajpal & Sons. Hindi translations of Nobel Prize–winning authors Rabindranath Tagore, Amartya Sen and Patrick Modiano are also on its list of published works.

According to the publisher, 70 new titles are published every year, and the publishing house has a catalogue of 1500 books in print.

== See also ==
- Book publishing in India
- Rangila Rasul

== Bibliography ==
- Ambedkar, Bhimrao Ramji (1945). Thoughts On Pakistan (Google Books) (published 2015). OCLC 5167934.
- Assad, Ahmed (31 October 2018). "A brief history of the anti-blasphemy laws". Karachi: Herald (Pakistan). Dawn Media Group.
- Nair, Neeti (7 August 2013). "Beyond the 'Communal' 1920s: The Problem of Intention, Legislative Pragmatism, and the Making of Section 295A of the Indian Penal Code". The Indian Economic & Social History Review. 50 (3). Thousand Oaks, California: SAGE Publishing: 317–340. doi:10.1177/0019464613494622. S2CID 144068997.
