= Srijan Pal Singh =

Indian author, speaker, entrepreneur

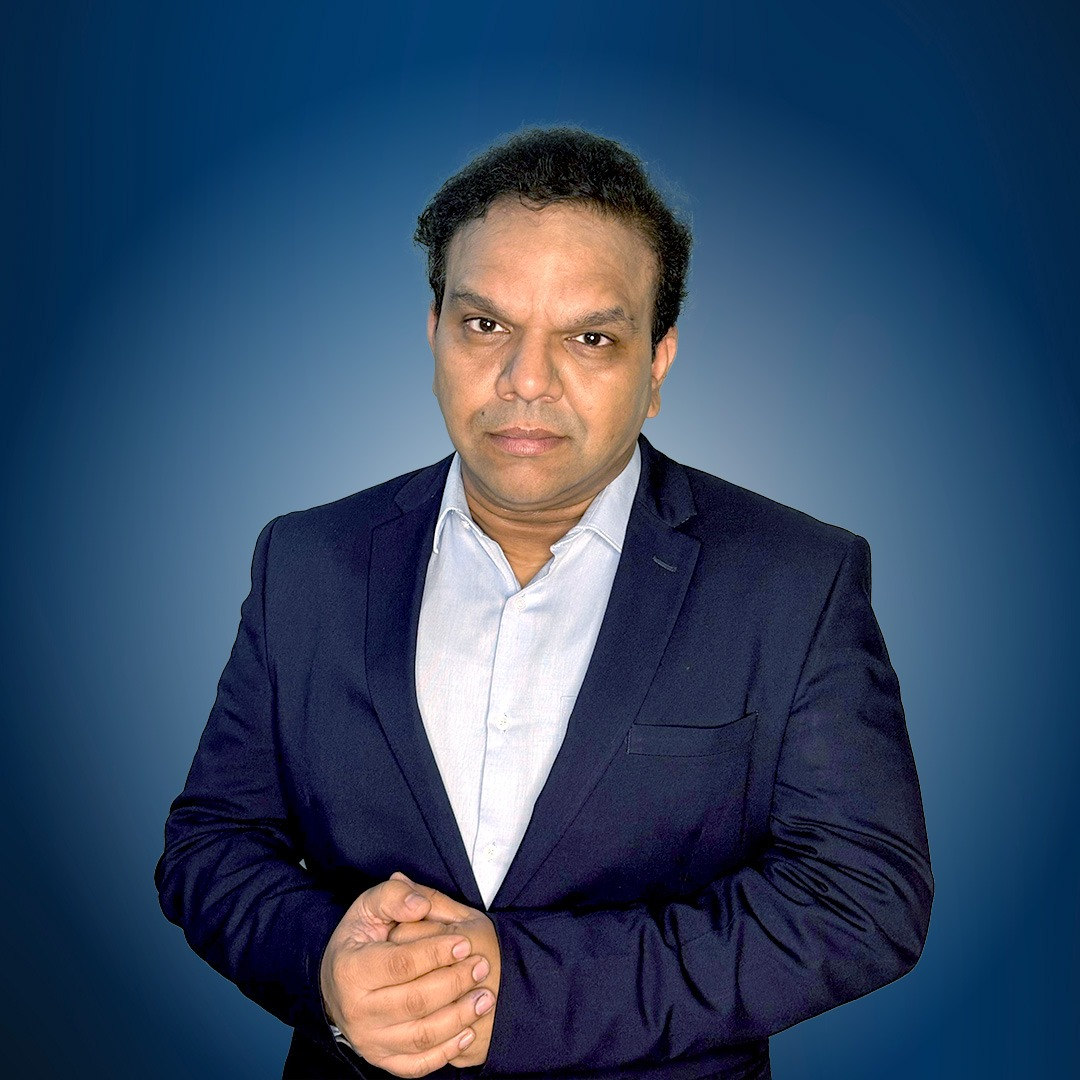
- Srijan Pal Singh
- Born: 18 January; Lucknow, India
- Education: B.Tech. (Electrical Engineering), MBA
- Alma mater: Indian Institute of Management Ahmedabad; Institute of Engineering and Technology, Uttar Pradesh Technical University
- Occupations: Indian Author, Scientist, Public speaker, Entrepreneur
- Spouse: None
- Children: None
- Writing career
- Pen name: Srijan Pal Singh Kalam
- Notable works: I am the Universe; Advantage India: From Challenge to Opportunity; Reignited: Scientific Pathways to a Brighter Future; What Can I Give?: Life lessons from My Teacher - Dr A.P.J. Abdul Kalam
- Notable awards: Young Alumni Achievers Award 2022 (IIM-A)

Srijan Pal Singh is an Indian author, scientist, public speaker, and social entrepreneur. He is an electrical engineer from the Institute of Engineering & Technology, Lucknow. He worked closely with the Former President of India Dr A. P. J. Abdul Kalam.

== Early life and education ==
He was born in Lucknow, Uttar Pradesh. His early education was completed in La Martiniere College, Lucknow.

== Career ==
At Boston Consulting Group (BCG), he collaborated with the World Food Programme to enhance governance and transparency in the Public Distribution System (PDS) in Naxal-affected areas of Odisha.

He played a crucial role in Providing Urban Amenities to Rural Areas (PURA), a rural development initiative that was later adopted as a national program by the Government of India in partnership with private corporations.

During this time, he co-authored three books with Dr. Kalam. Target 3 Billion, published in 2011, focused on sustainable rural development and proposed solutions that later influenced national policies.

In 2016, he was named a Mentor for the Uttar Pradesh Startup Policy.

In 2014, he co-founded Barefoot IT, an initiative aimed at empowering rural communities through technology and policy. Under this, he launched e-Spandana, a platform designed to connect rural citizens with their elected representatives to address community issues.

He is the Founder & CEO of Homi Lab, a future learning lab dedicated to preparing the next generation of pioneers to tackle climate change, sustainable energy, space exploration, AI, robotics, and interplanetary missions.

As an author, he has written extensively on management, urban development, and leadership. In 2015, he published Excellence in Management, a study on best practices in public sector management, focusing on Delhi Metro Rail Corporation, published by UNDP.

His writings have been featured in The Hindu, Times of India, BusinessWorld, and Rajasthan Patrika. As a public speaker, he has delivered talks at TEDx events, the Australia-India Youth Dialogue (AIYD).

== Recognition ==
In 2022, he was honored with the Young Alumni Achievers Award by the Indian Institute of Management Ahmedabad (IIM-A) for his outstanding contributions to social service.

== Books and publications ==
- Target 3 Billion by A. P. J. Abdul Kalam and Srijan Pal Singh | Publisher Penguin Books
- Khushhal Va Samridh Vishwa by A. P. J. Abdul Kalam and Srijan Pal Singh | Publisher Prabhat Prakashan
- Delhi Metro: Excellence in Management by Samar K. Datta; Biju Varkkey; Srijan Pal Singh; and Suyog Nankar | Publisher UNDP
- Smart and Human Building Cities of Wisdom by Srijan Pal Singh and G.R.K. Reddy | Publisher Harper Collins India
- A Perspective on Fisheries Sector Interventions for Livelihood Promotion]
- Education in the Australia-India Relationship
- Assessing Impacts of Bandhan's Micro-credit and Related Development Interventions
- Reignited: Scientific Pathways to a Brighter Future
- Advantage India: From Challenge to Opportunity
- What Can I Give? Life Lessons from my Teacher
- Black Tiger: Defeating India's Corrupted
- Reignited 2: Emerging Technologies of Tomorrow
- I am the Universe by Srijan Pal Singh | Publisher Penguin Books
