= List of awards and honours received by A. P. J. Abdul Kalam =

11th President of India

The Honourable A. P. J. Abdul Kalam
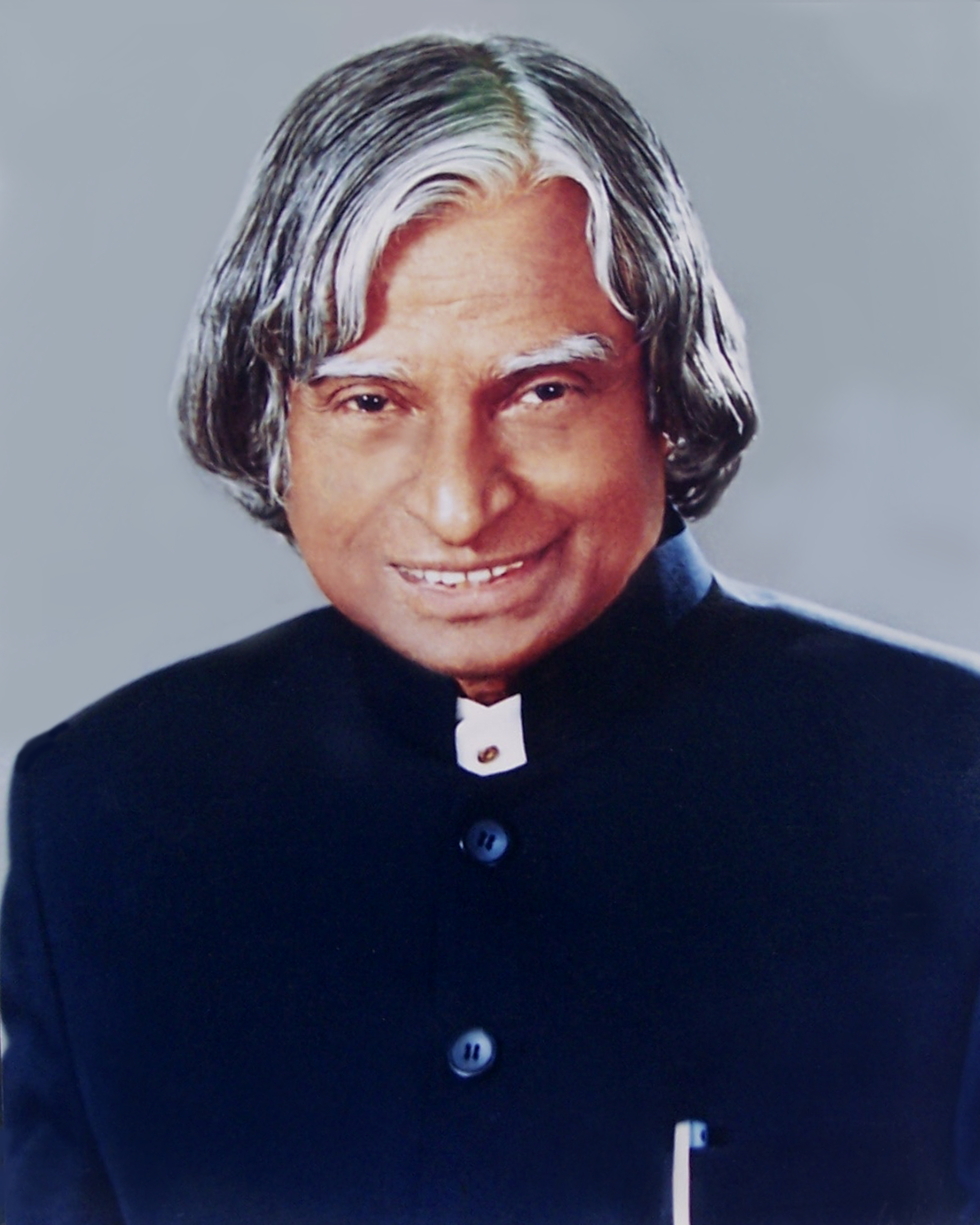
- Official portrait, 2002
- Born: Avul Pakir Jainulabdeen Abdul Kalam; 15 October 1931; Rameswaram, Madras Presidency, British India
- Died: 27 July 2015 (aged 83); Shillong, Meghalaya, India
- Resting place: Dr. A. P. J. Abdul Kalam Memorial
- Education: St. Joseph's College; Madras Institute of Technology
- Occupations: Aerospace scientist; Author
- Years active: 1960–2015
- Organizations: Defence Research and Development Organisation; Indian Space Research Organisation
- Known for: Missile programme of India
- Notable work: Wings of Fire; India 2020; Ignited Minds; Indomitable Spirit; Transcendence: My Spiritual Experiences with Pramukh Swamiji
- Office: President of India
- Term: 25 July 2002 – 25 July 2007
- Predecessor: K. R. Narayanan
- Successor: Pratibha Patil

A. P. J. Abdul Kalam was an Indian aerospace scientist and statesman who was president of India from 2002 to 2007. Born in Rameswaram in Southern India, Kalam spent four decades as a scientist and science administrator, mainly at the Defence Research and Development Organisation and Indian Space Research Organisation and was intimately involved in India's civilian space programme and military missile development efforts. He was known as the "Missile Man of India" for his work on the development of ballistic missile and launch vehicle technology. He also played a pivotal organisational, technical, and political role in India's Pokhran-II nuclear tests in 1998.

He was elected as the president of India in 2002 and was widely referred to as the "People's President". He engaged in teaching, writing and public service after his presidency.

Kalam was a recipient of several awards, including the Bharat Ratna, India's highest civilian honour.

== National honours ==
Ribbon	Decoration	Country	Date	Location	Presenter	Note	Ref(s)
	Bharat Ratna	India	1 March 1998 (announced 25 November 1997)	New Delhi	President; K. R. Narayanan	The highest civilian honour of India.	
	Padma Vibhushan	India	24 March 1990 (announced 26 January 1990)	New Delhi	President; Ramaswamy Venkataraman	The second-highest civilian honour of India.	
	Padma Bhushan	India	28 March 1981 (announced 26 January 1981)	New Delhi	President; Neelam Sanjiva Reddy	The third-highest civilian honour of India.	

== Foreign honours ==
Ribbon	Decoration	Country	Date	Location	Presenter	Note	Ref(s)
	Congressional Medal of Achievement	Philippines	6 February 2006	Manila	Speaker; Jose de Venecia Jr.	The highest parliamentary honour of Philippines.	
	Gold Medal of the Hellenic Parliament	Greece	27 April 2007	Athens	Speaker; Anna Benaki-Psarouda	The highest parliamentary honour of Greece.	

== Key to the City ==
Year	Honour	City	Country	Presenter	Ref(s)
2007	Gold Medal of Merit of the City of Athens	Athens	Greece	Mayor; Nikitas Kaklamanis	

== Scholastic ==
=== Chancellor, visitor, governor, rector and fellowships ===
Year	Fellowship	Institution	Country	Ref(s)
1994	Distinguished fellow	Institute of Directors	India	
1995	Honorary fellow	National Academy of Medical Sciences	India	
2007	Chancellor	Indian Institute of Space Science and Technology	India	
2011	Honorary member	Institute of Electrical and Electronics Engineers	United States	
2014	Honorary professor	Peking University	China	

=== Honorary degrees ===
Year	Degree	University	Country	Ref(s)
2007	Doctor of Science and Technology	Carnegie Mellon University	United States	
2007	Doctor of Science	University of Wolverhampton	United Kingdom	
2008	Doctor of Science	Aligarh Muslim University	India	
2008	Doctor of Science	Universiti Sains Malaysia	Malaysia	
2008	Doctor of Engineering	Nanyang Technological University	Singapore	
2009	Honorary doctorate	Oakland University	United States	
2010	Doctor of Engineering	University of Waterloo	Canada	
2012	Doctor of Law	Simon Fraser University	Canada	
2014	Doctor of Science	University of Edinburgh	United Kingdom	

== Other awards ==
Year	Award	Country/Organisation	Ref(s)
1996	H. K. Firodia Award	H. K. Firodia Foundation	
1997	Indira Gandhi Award for National Integration	Indian National Congress	
1998	Swatantryaveer Savarkar Award	Government of Maharashtra	
2000	Ramanujan Award	Alvars Research Centre	
2007	King Charles II Medal	Royal Society	
2009	Hoover Medal	American Society of Mechanical Engineers	
2009	International von Kármán Wings Award	California Institute of Technology	
2013	Von Braun Award	National Space Society	

== Addresses to foreign legislatures ==
Country	Legislature	Date	Ref.
Sudan	National Assembly of Sudan	21 October 2003	
African Union	Pan-African Parliament	16 September 2004	
Philippines	Congress of the Philippines	6 February 2006	
Mauritius	National Assembly of Mauritius	13 March 2006	
European Union	European Parliament	25 April 2007	

== Recognition ==
Year	Recognition	Organisation	Ref(s)
2004	Wax figure	Madame Tussauds	
2009	The 500 Most Influential Muslims	Royal Islamic Strategic Studies Centre	
2010	The 500 Most Influential Muslims	Royal Islamic Strategic Studies Centre	
2011	The 500 Most Influential Muslims	Royal Islamic Strategic Studies Centre	
2012	The 500 Most Influential Muslims	Royal Islamic Strategic Studies Centre	
2012	2nd Greatest Indian	Outlook	
2013	The 500 Most Influential Muslims	Royal Islamic Strategic Studies Centre	
2014	The 500 Most Influential Muslims	Royal Islamic Strategic Studies Centre	
2014	10th Most Admired Person in the World	YouGov	
2015	The 500 Most Influential Muslims	Royal Islamic Strategic Studies Centre	
2015	Postage stamp	India Post	

=== Other recognitions ===
- Kalam's birthday, 15 October, is celebrated as World Students' Day in India.
- In 2015, the Government of Tamil Nadu announced that Kalam's birthday, 15 October, would be observed as "Youth Renaissance Day".

== See also ==
- List of Padma Vibhushan award recipients
- List of Padma Bhushan award recipients (1980–1989)
