= List of postage stamps of India (2011–2015) =

This is a list of postage stamps issued by the India Post between 2011 and 2015.

== 2011 ==
#	Issue date	Description	Image	Denomination	Ref.
1	15 Jan 2011	100 Years of 'Doot' Periodical		5.00	
2	27 Jan 2011	Krishnadevaraya 500 Years		5.00	
3	1 Feb 2011	Chaudhary Ranbir Singh		5.00	
4	2 Feb 2011	400 years of Foundation of Mary Ward–Loreto Institutions		5.00	
5	4 Feb 2011	100 Years of corps of signals		5.00	
6	7 Feb 2011	V. Subbiah Birth Centenary		5.00	
7	8 Feb 2011	Census of India, 2011		5.00	
8	11 Feb 2011	V. Venkatasubha Reddiar		5.00	
9	12 Feb 2011	Special Khadi Stamp - Mahatma Gandhi		100 ₨	
*	100 Years of Airmail commemorating 100 years of Allahabad - Naini Flight (Miniature sheet of 4 Stamps)				
10	12 Feb 2011	U.P. Exhibition camp Allahbad		5.00	
10	12 Feb 2011	Pequets Flight Path		5.00	
10	12 Feb 2011	Pequets Flight Path		5.00	
10	12 Feb 2011	Flight over Yamuna design line		5.00	
*	Legendary heroines of India (Miniature sheet of 6 Stamps)				
11	13 Feb 2011	Leela Naidu		5.00	
11	13 Feb 2011	Savithri		5.00	
11	13 Feb 2011	Meena Kumari		5.00	
11	13 Feb 2011	Kanan Devi		5.00	
11	13 Feb 2011	Devika Rani		5.00	
11	13 Feb 2011	Nutan		5.00	
12	1 March 2011	Major General Claude Martin & La Martinière School, Kolkata		5.00	
13	23 March 2011	Subhadra Joshi		5.00	
14	20 Apr 2011	Chitralekha		5.00	
15	30 Apr 2011	Umarao Kunwrnji 'Archana'		5.00	
*	Rabindranath Tagore 150 years of birth anniversary (Miniature sheet of 2 Stamps)				
16	7 May 2011	Rabindranath Tagore as a poet & writer		5.00	
16	7 May 2011	Rabindranath Tagore as a dramatist & painter		5.00	
*	7th Africa—India Forum Summit, 2011 (Miniature sheet of 2 Stamps)				
17	25 May 2011	Indian Elephant		5.00	
17	25 May 2011	African Elephant		25.00	
18	6 Jul 2011	Dr. D. S. Kothari		5.00	
19	8 Jul 2011	United Theological College		5.00	
20	21 Jul 2011	Vitthal Sakharam Page		5.00	
21	28 Jul 2011	Kasu Brahmananda Reddy		5.00	
22	1 Aug 2011	K. M. Mathew		5.00	
*	80th Year of Rashtrapati Bhavan (Miniature sheet of 4 Stamps)				
23	5 Aug 2011	Neo Buddhist Dome		5.00	
23	5 Aug 2011	Jaipur Column		5.00	
23	5 Aug 2011	Mughal Jallies		5.00	
23	5 Aug 2011	Mughal Garden		5.00	
24	25 August 2011	Pt. K. Santanam		5.00	
25	29 August 2011	Dr. M. S. Aney		5.00	
26	2 Sep 2011	Surendra Nath Jauhar		5.00	
27	3 Sep 2011	Devnarayan		5.00	
28	7 Sep 2011	Tejaji Maharaj		5.00	
29	8 Sep 2011	Tripuraneni Gopichand		5.00	
30	25 Sep 2011	Jaimalaji Maharaj		5.00	
31	30 Sep 2011	The Trained Nurses Association of India		5.00	
32	9 Oct 2011	Chitrapur Math		5.00	
33	12 Oct 2011	The Punjab Regiment and 1 Para (SF) (1 Punjab)		5.00	
34	8 Nov 2011	Indian Council of Medical Research		5.00	
*	Children's Day (Set of 2 Stamps)				
35	14 Nov 2011	Save the tiger		5.00	
35	14 Nov 2011	Save the tiger		20.00	
36	25 Nov 2011	Grand Lodge of India		5.00	
37	6 Dec 2011	the Smile Train — Cleft Surgery		5.00	
38	11 Dec 2011	Kavi Pradeep		5.00	
39	19 Dec 2011	Goa Liberation — Golden Jubilee		5.00	
*	President's Fleet Review, Mumbai (Miniature sheet of 4 Stamps)				
40	19 Dec 2011	Submarine		5.00	
40	19 Dec 2011	Warship		5.00	
40	19 Dec 2011	Presidential Yacht		5.00	
40	19 Dec 2011	Naval Aircraft		5.00	
*	Archaeological Survey of India 150 Years (Miniature sheet of 2 Stamps)				
41	20 Dec 2011	Prehistoric clay models of animals		5.00	
41	20 Dec 2011	Prehistoric seals from ancient excavation		20.00	
42	23 Dec 2011	KGMC/CSMMU, Lucknow, Academic Centenary Year		5.00	
43	26 Dec 2011	Srinivasa Ramanujan		5.00	
44	27 Dec 2011	Madan Mohan Malaviya		5.00	

== 2012 ==
#	Issue date	Description	Image	Denomination	Ref.
1	2 Jan 2012	Puran Chandra Gupta		05.00	
2	15 Jan 2012	Bhai Jagta Ji		05.00	
3	24 Jan 2012	Shyam Narayan Singh		05.00	
4	9 Feb 2012	India International Centre		05.00	
5	24 Feb 2012	Employees' State Insurance Cooperation		05.00	
6	1 Mar 2012	Vasantdada Patil		05.00	
7	9 Mar 2012	Shyama Charan Shukla		05.00	
8	14 Mar 2012	Civil Aviation Centenary		20.00	
9	14 Mar 2012	Civil Aviation Centenary		05.00	
10	14 Mar 2012	Civil Aviation Centenary		05.00	
11	14 Mar 2012	Civil Aviation Centenary		05.00	
12	12 Apr 2012	Isabella Thoburn College, Lucknow		05.00	
13	17 Apr 2012	Godiji Temple, Mumbai		05.00	
14	18 Apr 2012	R. Venkataraman		05.00	
15	16 May 2012	Karpoor Chandra Kulish		05.00	
16	17 May 2012	M. B. Kadadi		05.00	
17	27 May 2012	800th Urs, Dargah Sharif, Ajmer		05.00	
18	27 May 2012	800th Urs, Dargah Sharif, Ajmer		20.00	
19	20 Jun 2012	Warli Painting		05.00	
20	20 Jun 2012	Shekhawati Painting		20.00	
*		London 2012 Olympic Games			
21	25 Jul 2012	Badminton		20.00	
22	25 Jul 2012	Rowing		05.00	
23	25 Jul 2012	Sailing		05.00	
24	25 Jul 2012	Volleyball		20.00	
25	26 Jul 2012	50 Years of Custom Act, 1962		05.00	
26	31 Jul 2012	Durga Prasad Chaudhary		05.00	
27	4 Aug 2012	Armed Forces Medical College, Pune		05.00	
28	29 Aug 2012	Husain Ahamd Madani		05.00	
29	25 Sep 2012	Motilal Nehru		05.00	
30	1 Oct 2012	Indo—Tibetan Border Police Force		05.00	
31	8 Oct 2012	Airborne Warning and Control System		05.00	
32	12 Oct 2012	Philately Day		20.00	
*		Endemic Species of Indian Biodiversity Hotspots			
33	16 Oct 2012	Venated Gliding Frog		05.00	
34	16 Oct 2012	Hoolock Gibbon		05.00	
35	16 Oct 2012	Nicobar Megapode		05.00	
36	16 Oct 2012	Bugun Liocichla		05.00	
*		India — Israel Joint Issue			
37	5 Nov 2012	Festival of Lights — Hanukkah		05.00	
38	5 Nov 2012	Festival of Lights — Deepavali		05.00	
39	11 Nov 2012	T. S. Narayanasami		05.00	
40	14 Nov 2012	Children's Day		05.00	
41	16 Nov 2012	The Scinde Horse		05.00	
42	20 Nov 2012	Ramgopal Maheshvari		05.00	
43	29 Nov 2012	Consumer Protection Act, 1986		05.00	
44	21 Dec 2012	Sri Shivarathri Shivayogi		05.00	
45	22 Dec 2012	National Mathematics Day		05.00	
*		Light Houses of India			
46	23 Dec 2012	Mahabalipuram (Mamallapuram) Lighthouse		05.00	
47	23 Dec 2012	Alleppy (Allaphuzha) Lighthouse		20.00	

== 2013 ==
#	Issue date	Description	Image	Denomination	Ref.
1	03 Jan 2013	100 Years of Indian Science Congress		5.00	
2	07 Jan 2013	Postgraduate Institute of Medical Education and Research, Chandigarh		5.00	
3	08 Jan 2013	125 Years of Uttar Pradesh Legislature		5.00	
4	11 January 2013	Silk Letter Movement		5.00	
*	150th Birth Anniversary of Swami Vivekananda (set of 4 Stamps)				
5	12 January 2013	150th Birth Anniversary of Swami Vivekananda		5.00	
5	12 January 2013	150th Birth Anniversary of Swami Vivekananda		5.00	
5	12 January 2013	150th Birth Anniversary of Swami Vivekananda		5.00	
5	12 January 2013	150th Birth Anniversary of Swami Vivekananda		5.00	
6	13 January 2013	C. Achutha Menon		5.00	
7	14 January 2013	Aditya Vikram Birla		5.00	
8	22 January 2013	Shrine Basilica, Vailankanni		5.00	
9	2 March 2013	200 years of 3 PARA (Special Forces)		5.00	
10	7 March 2013	Golden Jubilee of Officers Training Academy, Chennai		5.00	
11	8 March 2013	Sahir Ludhianvi		5.00	
12	16 March 2013	125 years of Malayala Manorama		5.00	
13	17 March 2013	Jhulelal		5.00	
14	22 March 2013	Shiv Ram Hari Rajguru		5.00	
*	Architectural Heritage of India (Set of 2 Stamps)				
15	11 April 2013	SriKurmam Temple, Srikakulam		5.00	
15	11 April 2013	Arasavalli Temple, Srikakulam		5.00	
*	Heritage Post Office Buildings of India (Set of 2 Stamps)				
16	12 April 2013	Mumbai G.P.O.		5.00	
16	12 April 2013	Agra H.P.O.		5.00	
17	14 April 2013	Chaitya Bhoomi		5.00	
18	30 April 2013	Hari Singh Nalwa		5.00	
*	100 Years of Indian Cinema (Set of 50 Stamps in 6 Sheetlets)				
19	3 May 2013	Sheetlet 1/6			
19	3 May 2013	Ashok Kumar		5.00	
19	3 May 2013	Birendranath Sircar		5.00	
19	3 May 2013	B. R. Chopra		5.00	
19	3 May 2013	Bhalji Pendharkar		5.00	
19	3 May 2013	Bhupen Hazarika		5.00	
19	3 May 2013	Dev Anand		5.00	
19	3 May 2013	Dhirendra Nath Ganguly		5.00	
19	3 May 2013	Durga Khote		5.00	
19	3 May 2013	Hrishikesh Mukherjee		5.00	
20	3 May 2013	Sheetlet 2/6			
20	3 May 2013	Majrooh Sultanpuri		5.00	
20	3 May 2013	Naushad		5.00	
20	3 May 2013	Nitin Bose		5.00	
20	3 May 2013	Prithviraj Kapoor		5.00	
20	3 May 2013	Raichand Boral		5.00	
20	3 May 2013	Ruby Myers		5.00	
20	3 May 2013	Sohrab Modi		5.00	
20	3 May 2013	Tapan Sinha		5.00	
20	3 May 2013	Yash Chopra		5.00	
21	3 May 2013	Sheetlet 3/6			
21	3 May 2013	Allu Ramalingaiah		5.00	
21	3 May 2013	Ashok Mehta		5.00	
21	3 May 2013	Balraj Sahni		5.00	
21	3 May 2013	P. Bhanumathi		5.00	
21	3 May 2013	C. V. Sridhar		5.00	
21	3 May 2013	Chetan Anand		5.00	
21	3 May 2013	Kamal Amrohi		5.00	
21	3 May 2013	Geeta Dutt		5.00	
22	3 May 2013	Sheetlet 4/6			
22	3 May 2013	Kannadasan		5.00	
22	3 May 2013	Madan Mohan		5.00	
22	3 May 2013	Mehmood		5.00	
22	3 May 2013	Motilal		5.00	
22	3 May 2013	Nagesh		5.00	
22	3 May 2013	O. P. Nayyar		5.00	
22	3 May 2013	Prem Nazir		5.00	
22	3 May 2013	R. D. Burman		5.00	
23	3 May 2013	Sheetlet 5/6			
23	3 May 2013	Raj Khosla		5.00	
23	3 May 2013	Rajendra Kumar		5.00	
23	3 May 2013	Rajesh Khanna		5.00	
23	3 May 2013	S. V. Ranga Rao		5.00	
23	3 May 2013	Salil Chowdhury		5.00	
23	3 May 2013	Sanjeev Kumar		5.00	
23	3 May 2013	Shailendra		5.00	
23	3 May 2013	Shakeel Badayuni		5.00	
24	3 May 2013	Sheetlet 6/6			
24	3 May 2013	Shammi Kapoor		5.00	
24	3 May 2013	Shankar–Jaikishan		5.00	
24	3 May 2013	Smita Patil		5.00	
24	3 May 2013	Suraiya		5.00	
24	3 May 2013	Tarachand Barjatya		5.00	
24	3 May 2013	T. R. Sundaram		5.00	
24	3 May 2013	Utpal Dutt		5.00	
24	3 May 2013	Dr. Vishnuvardhan		5.00	
*	Endangered wild Ass (Set of 2 Stamps)				
25	11 May 2013	kiang, Ladakh		5.00	
25	11 May 2013	ghor khar, Kutch		5.00	
27	24 May 2013	Securities and Exchange Board of India		5.00	
28	25 June 2013	Peerzada Ghulam Ahmad Mehjoor		5.00	
29	3 July 2013	Delhi Gymkhana Club		5.00	
30	7 August 2013	Kerala Legislative Assembly		5.00	
31	21 August 2013	Raj Bahadur		5.00	
*	Wild flowers (set of 12 Stamps)				
32	3 September 2013	Dibang chirita		5.00	
32	3 September 2013	Kashmir mallow		5.00	
32	3 September 2013	Himalayan mini sunflower		5.00	
32	3 September 2013	Himalayan lantern		5.00	
32	3 September 2013	Roundleaf asiabell		5.00	
32	3 September 2013	Blue poppy		5.00	
32	3 September 2013	Globe thistle		5.00	
32	3 September 2013	Himalayan iris		5.00	
32	3 September 2013	Himalayan bellflower		5.00	
32	3 September 2013	Cobra lily		5.00	
32	3 September 2013	Rhododendron		5.00	
32	3 September 2013	Bladder campion		5.00	
33	9 September 2013	Lala Jagat Narain		5.00	
34	10 September 2013	Acharya Gyansagar		5.00	
35	21 September 2013	Gurajada Apparao		5.00	
36	24 September 2013	Pratap Narayan Mishra		5.00	
37	30 September 2013	Joomdev		5.00	
38	12 October 2013	Philately Day 2013		20.00	
39	22 October 2013	Bhakra Dam		5.00	
40	24 October 2013	Ruchi Ram Sahni		5.00	
41	5 November 2013	Boys' High School & College (Allahabad, Uttar Pradesh)		5.00	
42	7 November 2013	Bharatiya Vidya Bhavan		5.00	
43	8 November 2013	Indian Academy of Pediatrics		5.00	
	11 November 2013	Central Bureau of Investigation		5.00	
45	13 November 2013	The Times of India		5.00	
46	14 November 2013	Children's Day 2013		5.00	
*	200th Test match Sachin Tendulkar (Set of 2 Stamps)				
47	14 November 2013	Sachin Tendulkar 200th Test match		20.00	
47	14 November 2013	Sachin Tendulkar 200th Test match		20.00	
48	23 November 2013	Sathya Sai Baba		5.00	
49	23 November 2013	Intelligence Bureau		5.00	
50	29 November 2013	Sashastra Seema Bal		5.00	

== 2014 ==
#	Issue date	Description	Image	Denomination	Ref.
1	14 January 2014	Food Corporation of India		5.00	
2	30 January 2014	International Year of Crystallography		20.00	
*	2 February 2014	Indian Museum, Kolkata (set of 3 Stamps)			
3		Indian Museum, Kolkata		20.00	
4		Indian Museum, Kolkata		5.00	
5		Indian Museum, Kolkata		20.00	
*	8 February 2014	Jagjit singh (set of 2 Stamps)			
6		Jagjit singh		20.00	
7		Jagjit singh		5.00	
8	11 February 2014	Central Vigilance Commission		5.00	
9	25 February 2014	Hasrat Mohani		5.00	
10	25 April 2014	National Council of Churches in India		5.00	
11	30 April 2014	Chattampi Swamikal		5.00	
12	30 April 2014	Govind Ballabh Pant Hospital, Delhi		5.00	
13	14 May 2014	Drukpa Lineage of Buddhism		5.00	
*	12 June 2014	2014 FIFA World Cup (set of 4 Stamps)			
14		2014 FIFA World Cup		25.00	
15		2014 FIFA World Cup		5.00	
16		2014 FIFA World Cup		5.00	
17		2014 FIFA World Cup		25.00	
18	20 August 2014	Gaiety Theatre		5.00	
19	25 October	Anagarika Dharmapala		5.00	
*	3 September 2014	Indian Musician (set of 8 Stamps)			
20		Ali Akbar Khan		5.00	
21		Bhimsen Joshi		25.00	
22		D. K. Pattammal		5.00	
23		Gangubai Hangal		5.00	
24		Kumar Gandharva		5.00	
25		Mallikarjun Mansur		5.00	
26		Ravi Shankar		5.00	
27		Vilayat Khan		5.00	
28	4 November 2014	Liver Transplantation		5.00	
29	12 November 2014	Unit Trust of India		5.00	
*	28 November 2014	India Slovenia Joint Issue (set of 2 Stamps)			
30		India Slovenia Joint Issue		25.00	
31		India Slovenia Joint Issue		5.00	
32	29 November 2014	Sagol Kangjei		5.00	
33	4 December 2014	Swami Ekrasanand Saraswati		5.00	
34	15 December 2014	Kendriya Vidyalaya Sangathan		5.00	
35	24 December 2014	Kuka Movement		5.00	
36	30 December 2014	Baba Amte		5.00	

== 2015 ==
#	Issue date	Description	Image	Denomination
*	8 January 2015	100 Years of Mahatma Gandhi’s Return (set of 2 Stamps)		
1	8 January 2015	100 Years of Mahatma Gandhi’s Return		5.00 Rs
2	8 January 2015	100 Years of Mahatma Gandhi’s Return		25.00 Rs
3	22 January 2015	Beti Bachao Beti Padhao		5.00 Rs
*	30 January 2015	Swachh Bharat (set of 2 Stamps)		
4	30 January 2015	Sweeping		5.00 Rs
5	30 January 2015	Sanitation		5.00 Rs
6	30 January 2015	Cleaning		5.00 Rs
7	14 February 2015	Project Rukmani		5.00 Rs
8	20 March 2015	Indian Ocean and Rajendra Chola 1		5.00 Rs
9	27 March 2015	Engineers India Limited		5.00 Rs
*	10 April 2015	India - France : 50 years of space cooperation (set of 2 Stamps)		
10	10 April 2015	SARAL (Satellite with ARgos and ALtiKa)		25.00 Rs
11	10 April 2015	Megha-Tropiques		5.00 Rs
12	18 April 2015	Patna High Court		5.00 Rs
13	21 April 2015	Old Seminary kottayam		5.00 Rs
14	21 June 2015	International Yoga Day		5.00 Rs
15	17 July 2015	Nabakalebara		5.00 Rs
16	24 August 2015	Samrat Ashoka		5.00 Rs
*	2 September 2015	Women Empowerment (set of 4 Stamps)		
17	2 September 2015	Agricultural Women		5.00 Rs
18	2 September 2015	Women Dreamers		5.00 Rs
19	2 September 2015	Cooking Women		5.00 Rs
20	2 September 2015	Professional Women		5.00 Rs
21	10 September 2015	10th World Hindi Conference		5.00 Rs
*	15 September 2015	Valour & Sacrifice - 1965 War (set of 3 Stamps)		
22	15 September 2015	Infantry		5.00 Rs
23	15 September 2015	Navy		5.00 Rs
24	15 September 2015	Air Force		5.00 Rs
25	30 September 2015	Dr. B. R. Ambedkar and Constitution of India		5.00 Rs
26	1 October 2015	Mahant Avaidyanath		5.00 Rs
27	15 October 2015	Dr. A.P.J. Abdul Kalam		5.00 Rs
*	15 October 2015	Charkha or the Spinning Wheel (set of 2 Stamps)		
28	15 October 2015	Bardoli Charka		5.00 Rs
29	15 October 2015	Peti Charkha		5.00 Rs
30	21 October 2015	Border Security Force		5.00 Rs
*	29 October 2015	Third India–Africa Forum Summit (Set of 6)		
31	29 October 2015	Black Buck		5.00 Rs
32	29 October 2015	Indian Lion		25.00 Rs
33	29 October 2015	African Lion		25.00 Rs
34	29 October 2015	Indian rhinoceros		5.00 Rs
35	29 October 2015	African Rhinoceros		5.00 Rs
36	29 October 2015	Thomson's Gazelle		5.00 Rs
*	2 November 2015	Bicentenary of First Gorkha Rifles (Set of 2)		
37	2 November 2015	1st Gorkha Rifles		5.00 Rs
38	2 November 2015	3rd Gorkha Rifles		5.00 Rs
*	14 November 2015	Children's Day (Set of 2)		
39	14 November 2015	Children's Day		5.00 Rs
40	14 November 2015	Children's Day		25.00 Rs
41	16 November 2015	Bharat Heavy Electricals Limited (BHEL)		5.00 Rs
*	24 November 2015	India-Singapore: Joint Issue (Set of 2 Stamps)		
42	24 November 2015	Rashtrapati Bhavan		25.00 Rs
43	24 November 2015	Istana		5.00 Rs
44	24 November 2015	EEPC India		5.00 Rs
*	3 December 2015	Zoological Survey of India (Set of 2 Stamps)		
45	3 December 2015	Zoological Survey of India (ZSI)		5.00 Rs
46	3 December 2015	Zoological Survey of India (ZSI)		25.00 Rs
47	23 December 2015	Sumitranandan Pant		5.00 Rs
48	26 December 2015	Alagumuthu Kone		5.00 Rs
49	30 December 2015	Institute for Defense Studies and Analyses		5.00 Rs
