= Agastheeswaram =

- Taluk
- Nickname: Agasteeshwaram
- Location in Tamil Nadu, India
- Coordinates: 8°6′0″N 77°31′15″E
- Country: India
- State: Tamil Nadu
- District: Kanniyakumari

Population (2001)
  - Total: 8,978

Languages
  - Official: Tamil
  - Spoken: Tamil
- Time zone: UTC+5:30 (IST)
- PIN: 629 701

Agastheeswaram is a panchayat town in Kanniyakumari district in the Indian state of Tamil Nadu.

== History ==
Agasteeswaram is named after Sage Agastya, who visited this place to teach the Ramayana. Most of the people from this village are well educated when compared with other districts in Tamil Nadu. Vivekanandha College is located in Agasteeswararam. Along with the talukas of Thovalai, Kalkulam, Eraniel and Vilavancode, Agasteeswaram was a part of the Padmanabhapuram division of the erstwhile Kingdom of Travancore until its union with Kochi in 1949 and continued to be a part of the state of Travancore–Cochin until November 1, 1956.

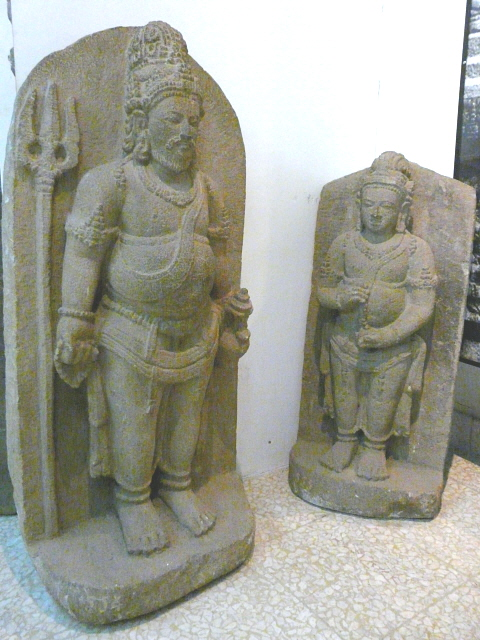
Sage Agastya

== Travancore State Manual ==
According to the Travancore state manual, Volume 2 Page 57, "One of the principal devil temples in Travancore is that represented in the annexed engraving situated at Agastispuram, near Cape Comorin; which is also the headquarters of the Shanar tribe where their Nadan, or Chieftain, resides, who was formerly allowed the privileges of having a fort, riding in a palanquin, and retaining 100 armed attendants, which he is too reduced to support now."

== Kottaram ==
Kottaram is one of the Panchayat town in the Agastheeswaram Taluk. It is situated 6km from Kanyakumari. People of different religions like Hindus, Christians and Muslims live here. Churches of the Church of South India, the Catholic Church, the Assemblies of God, and the Indian Pentecostal Church of God and many other independent Christian churches can be found here.

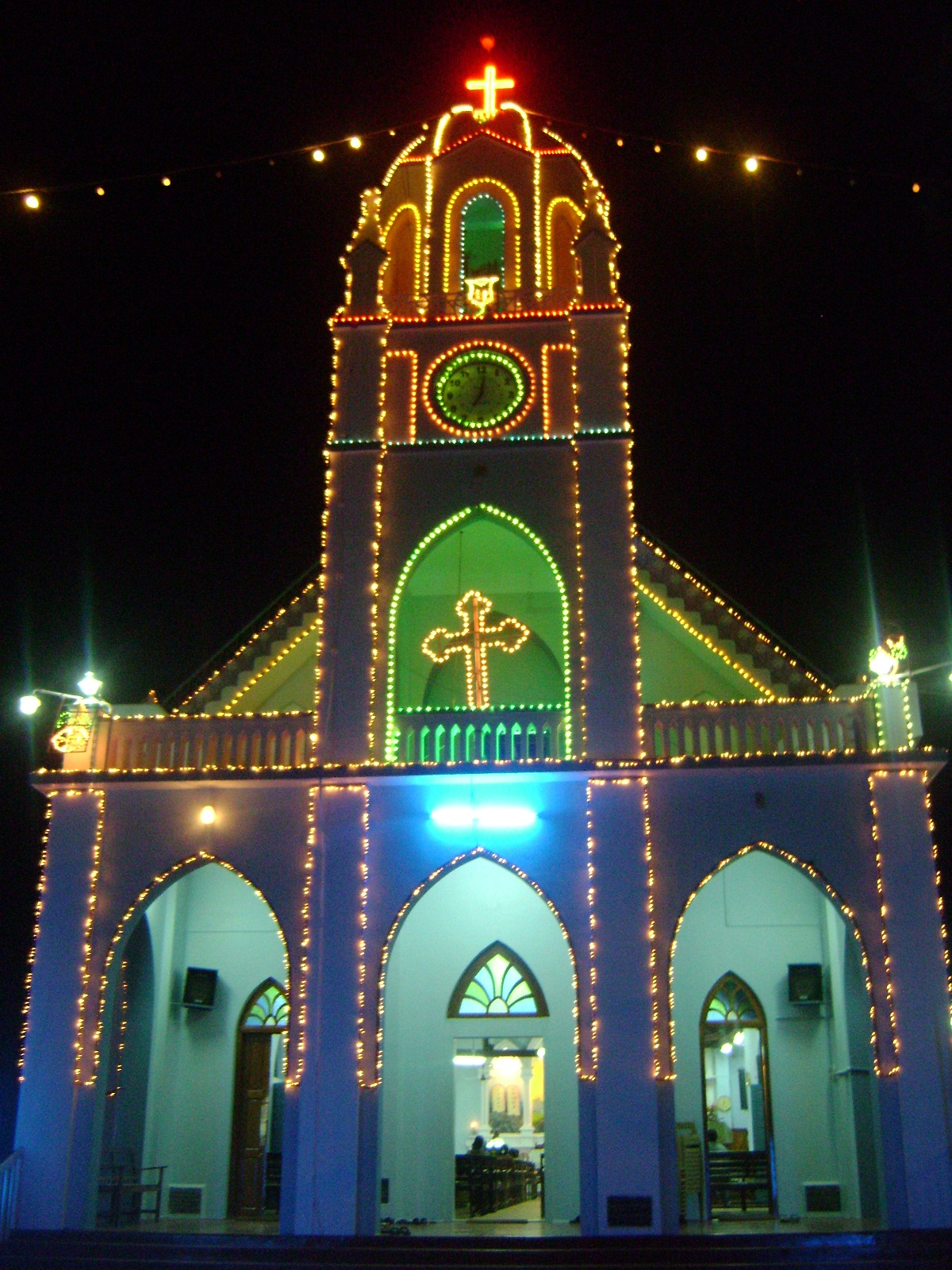
CSI District Church Kottaram

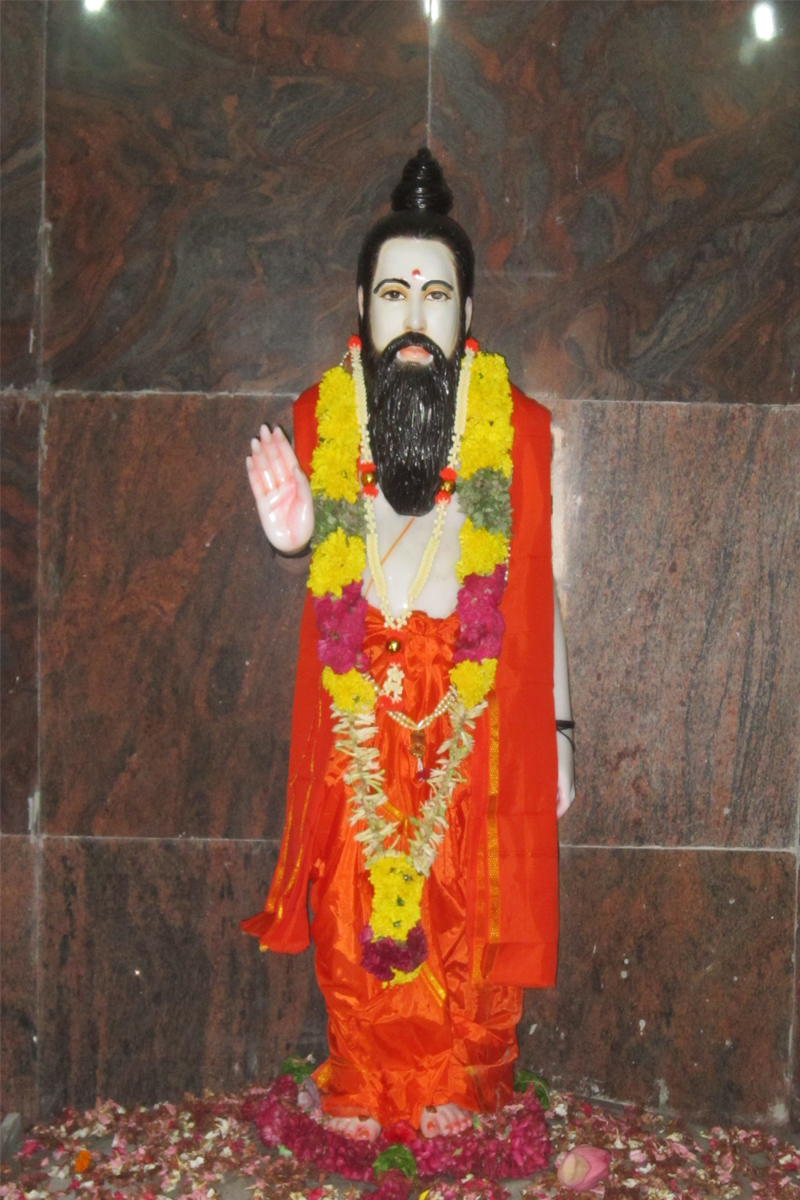
A idol of sage Agastya at Shri Datta Temple Near Vattakottai Fort, Kanyakumari District

== Demographics ==
Religions in Agastheeswaram Taluka
| Religion | Percent |
| Hindus | 82.99% |
| Christians | 11.91% |
| Muslims | 4.95% |
| Others | 0.16% |
As of 2001

India census, Agastheeswaram had a population of 8978. Males constitute 49% of the population and females 51%. Agastheeswaram has an average literacy rate of 84%, higher than the national average of 59.5%; with 50% of the males and 50% of females literate. 10% of the population is under 6 years of age.

== Famous people from Agastheeswaram ==
- Poongani, the traditional musical story teller, was born near here in 1934.
- Dr. P.H. Daniel (also, Paul Harris Daniel) – Doctor who first started employee union in the South Indian Tea Estates. The movie Paradesi is based on his novel Red Tea (also translated into Tamil as எரியும் பனிக்காடு).
- Dr. J. C. Daniel Nadar – Father of Malayalam Cinema, lived here until his death in 1975.
- Kumari Ananthan, his brother H. Vasanthakumar, daughter Tamilisai Soundarrajan – Political and entrepreneurial dynasty.

== See also ==
- Mangavilai
