= India Vision 2020 =

Indian government vision document

India: Vision 2020 is a document prepared under the chairmanship of S. P. Gupta, Planning Commission.

This vision document was inspired by APJ Abdul Kalam's 1998 book India 2020: A Vision for the New Millennium, which Kalam co-authored with Y. S. Rajan. This was preceded by a set of documents, "Technology Vision 2020," prepared in the mid-1990s under the Technology Information, Forecasting and Assessment Council of India's Department of Science and Technology during the chairmanship of Kalam.
