= Poongani =

Tamil Villu Paatu story teller/musician

Performing

Poongani (Tamil: பூங்கனி, also known as Poongani Ammal, Poongani Amma) (1934, Saravanan Theri – 2 November 2018, Kottaram, Tamil Nadu) was an Indian performer of Villu Paatu, a musical story-telling tradition in southern Tamil Nadu and Kerala. She was a recipient of the Om Muthu Mari Award of the University of Madras.

== Life ==
Poongani was born in 1934 in Saravanan Theri near Agastheeswaram in the Kanyakumari district of Tamil Nadu at the tip of India. She attended school till fourth grade but family circumstances did not permit her to continue.

At the age of either 10 or 12 she saw a troupe performing the villu paatu at a local temple. Two notable women exponents of the art-form, Lakshmi and Dhanalakshmi, encouraged her to pursue it. She then learned from Vedhamanikkam Pulavar and Sivalingam Vathiyar, maestros of the tradition.

Poongani began performing with a troupe in which Thangapandian, a percussionist of the kudam (a clay pot instrument), was a member. They married when she was fifteen years old, and continued to perform together.

Thangapandian died in 2015. Poongani lived in penury on a small pension in Kottaaram near Nagercoil, until her death on 2 November 2018, although in her final year her residence was given a polish. Lady Kash, a Tamil rapper from Singapore, visited her and cleaned her home. Her visit saw Poongani again at the centre of attention. The press reported that Lady Kash had created a song named "Villupattu" in her honour.

== Career ==
The villu paatu is a long-form musical story-telling tradition. It is performed with a stringed bow, accompanied by a troupe of musicians, and involves a call and response between the lead singer and the accompanists. Poongani developed a technique of bow playing along with a unique twirl of veesukol, twin thick sticks with bells, with which she would strike the bow. The ritual song traditionally lasted three days, telling the stories of regional deities but also expanded to include tales from the Mahabharata and the Ramayana. The performances were generally the curtain call to religious festivals at Mutharammam and Sudalaimadan temples.

Poongani and her troupe performed around southern Tamil Nadu and Kerala for more than fifty years, until her retirement at the age of 70.

Poongani was credited with knowing almost the entire classical repertoire of the villu paatu, as well developing new songs. She also taught younger generations of artistes.
