= Y. S. Rajan =

Indian physicist

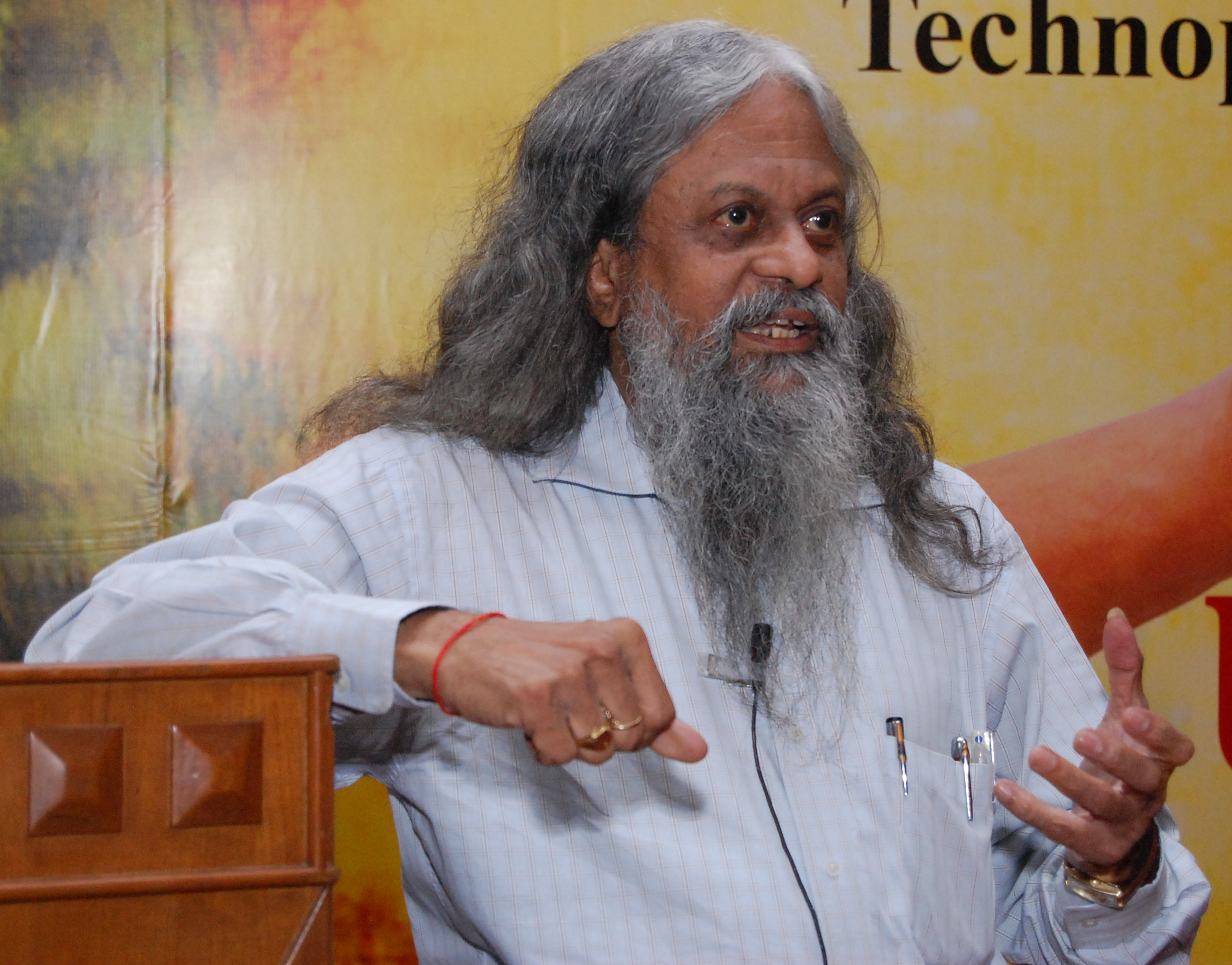
- YS Rajan in 2010
- Born: 10 April 1943 (age 83); Kottaram near Tirunelveli, Tamil Nadu, India
- Citizenship: India
- Spouse: Gomathi
- Awards: Padma Shri (2012)
- Scientific career
- Fields: Physics
- Workplaces: Indian Space Research Organisation

Yagnaswami Sundara Rajan or Y. S. Rajan (born 10 April 1943) is an Indian professor, scientist and administrator. He is Honorary Distinguished Professor in Indian Space Research Organisation. He has made major contributions to various aspects of management of science, technology and innovation. In 2012, he was awarded with Padma Shri for his contributions in science and engineering. He is one of the well known scientists who has closely worked with Abdul Kalam, former President of India.

== Early life ==
Y. S. Rajan was born into a Tamil Brahmin family on 10 April 1943 in Kottaram near Tirunelveli. His grandfather, Sundara Ganapadigal was a great Vedic scholar. His mother's name is Visalakshi and father's name is S Yagnaswami. His parents moved to Mumbai, and Dr. Y S Rajan went on to do his schooling and later college education here. He received his master's degree in Physics from the University of Bombay in 1964. He started his career as a research scholar at Physical Research Laboratory.

== Career ==
He went on to hold several positions including scientific secretary positions in Department of Space, Indian Space Research Organisation. He contributed in areas like STI administration, institution building, diplomacy, strategic studies, environmental technologies, and natural resources management. He was elected as Member of International Academy of Astronautics (IAA) (1986). He was the first Executive Director of Technology Information and Forecasting and Assessment Council (TIFAC), since (1988-2002) and executed Mission REACH, an initiative of TIFAC. He has held several senior positions in National Natural Resources Management System, Confederation of Indian Industry. He also served as Vice-Chancellor in Punjab Technical University (PTU), Scientific Adviser to Punjab Chief Minister, Chairman of the Board in Nalanda University and adjunct professor in Birla Institute of Technology & Science (BITS), Pilani.

== Books and works ==
He is a co-author of India 2020: A Vision for the New Millennium with A P J Abdul Kalam. (Hindi version: Bharat 2020 Aur Uske Baad). He has authored many books including Discover Your Power Quotient and more than 200 articles and papers, which have also been published in international journals.

== Honours ==
He has been honored with many awards including Padma Shri (2012), Fellow of the Indian National Academy of Engineering (1998), Fellow of World Academy of Art and Science (WAAS) (2010), Honorary Degree of Doctor of Letters (D.Litt.) from Jain Vishva Bharati University, Ladnun, Rajasthan (2005)
