= Gori Temple, Nagarparkar =

Śvetāmbara Jain temple in Nagarparkar, Pakistan

Gori Temple Sindhi: گوڙي مندر
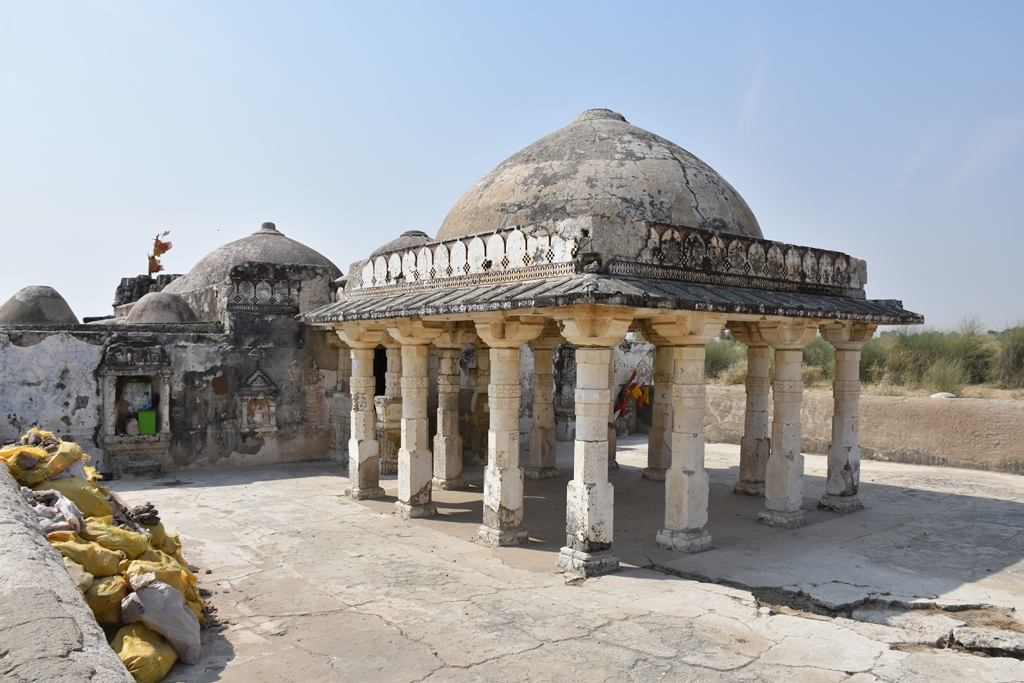
- Gori temple in Nagarparkar, Sindh

- Location within Sindh

Religion
- Affiliation: Jainism
- Sect: Śvetāmbara
- District: Tharparkar district
- Deity: Parshvanatha

Location
- Location: Nagarparkar
- State: Sindh
- Country: Pakistan
- Interactive map of Gori Temple; Sindhi: گوڙي مندر
- Coordinates: 24°38′17.3″N 70°37′03.9″E24°38'17.3"N 70°37'03.9"E

Architecture
- Established: 300 A.D

The Gori Temple (a.k.a. Gori jo Mandar or Temple of Gori) is a Śvetāmbara Jain temple part of the Nagarparkar temple complex in Nagarparkar. It's located 14 miles northwest of the Viravah Temple. It was built in 1375-1376 CE. The temple was exclusively allocated to the 23rd Jain Tirthankar Lord Parshwanath. This temple along with Jain temples of Nagarparkar were inscribed on the tentative list for UNESCO World Heritage status in 2016 as the Nagarparkar Cultural Landscape.

== Etymology ==
The name of this temple changed several times in the course of the centuries. It was built in 300 AD by Gorichom, a Jain worshiper.

== Design ==
Gori Temple has an architectural design similar to ones in Mount Abu, Rajasthan, India. The temple measures 125 feet by 60 feet, and is built of marble. The entire temple is built on a high platform that is reached by a series of steps carved into stone.

The interiors of the temple features adorned with Jain religious imagery which is older than any other frescos in the Jain temples of North India. It is designed in curved pillars and the canopy entrance of temple is decorated with paintings representing Jain mythology. The frescoes at Gori jo Mandir (Gori temple). The temple has 24 tiny cells, which might have been used to facilitate the 24 Tirthankaras of Jainism.

== Gallery ==
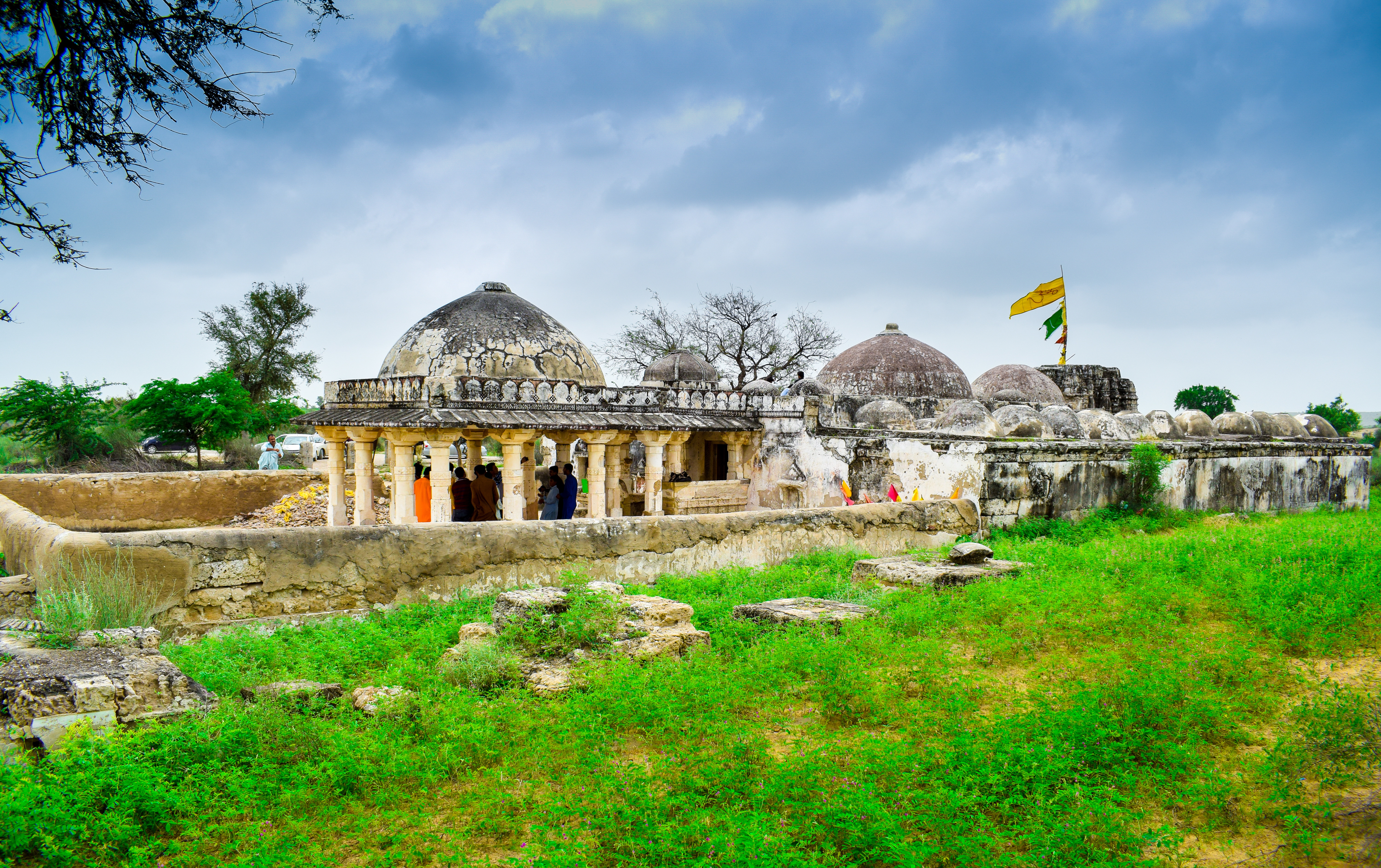
Gori temple from side view

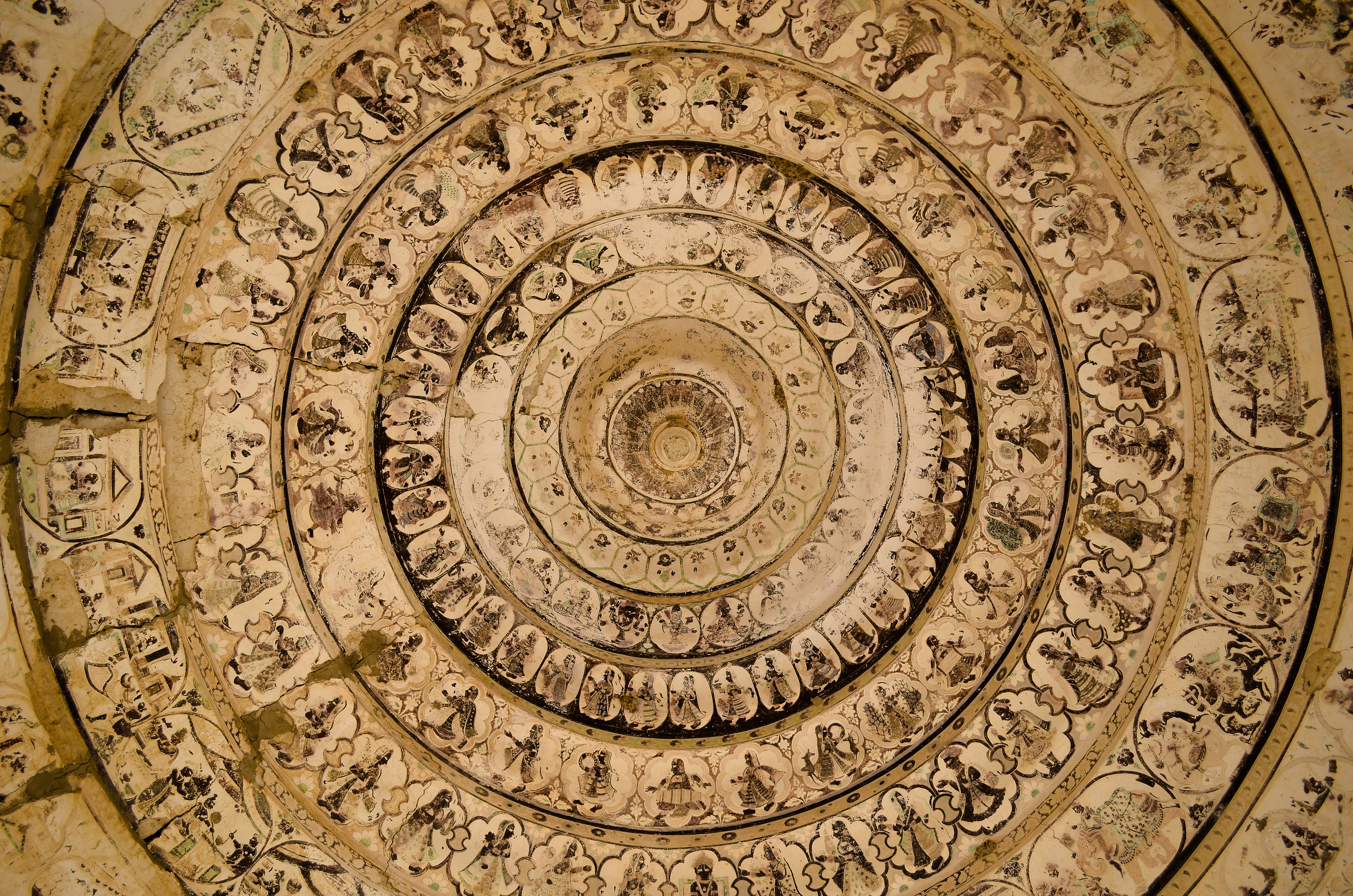
Ceiling

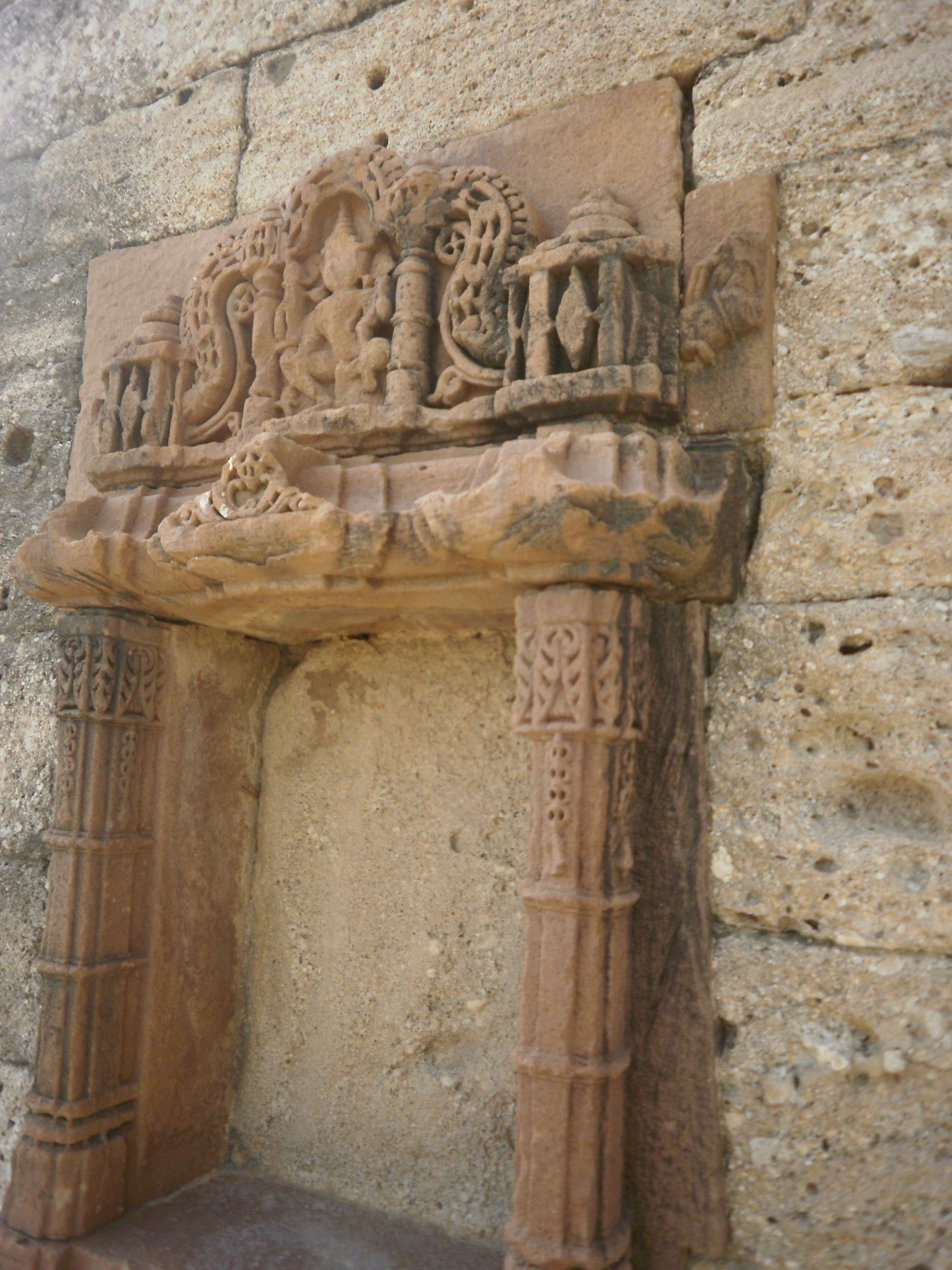
Remains

== See also ==
- Godiji
- Nagarparkar Jain Temples
- Parbrahm Ashram
