= T. S. Narayanasami =

Indian banker

T. S. Narayanasami (born 18 May 1949) is a former banker and the first MD & CEO (2009 - 2011) of United Stock Exchange of India, a currency derivatives exchange. His previous positions include:

- Chairman and Managing Director of Bank of India
- Chairman of the Managing Committee of Indian Banks' Association
- Chairman and Managing Director of Andhra Bank
- Chairman and Managing Director of Indian Overseas Bank
- Director, New India Assurance Co. Ltd., Mumbai
- President of the Governing Council of the Indian Institute of Banking and Finance
- Chairman of the Governing Board of Institute of Banking Personnel Selection

T.S. Narayanasami has been credited for helping scale up business opportunities to various banks as a leader. While he was the Executive Director of Punjab National Bank, the bank became the first bank to network all its branches.
