= Godiji =

Śvetāmbara Jain temple in Mumbai, Maharashtra, India

Shri Godiji Parshwanath, Mumbai
- श्री गोडीजी पार्श्वनाथ (Hindi); Śrī Godījī Pārshwanāth
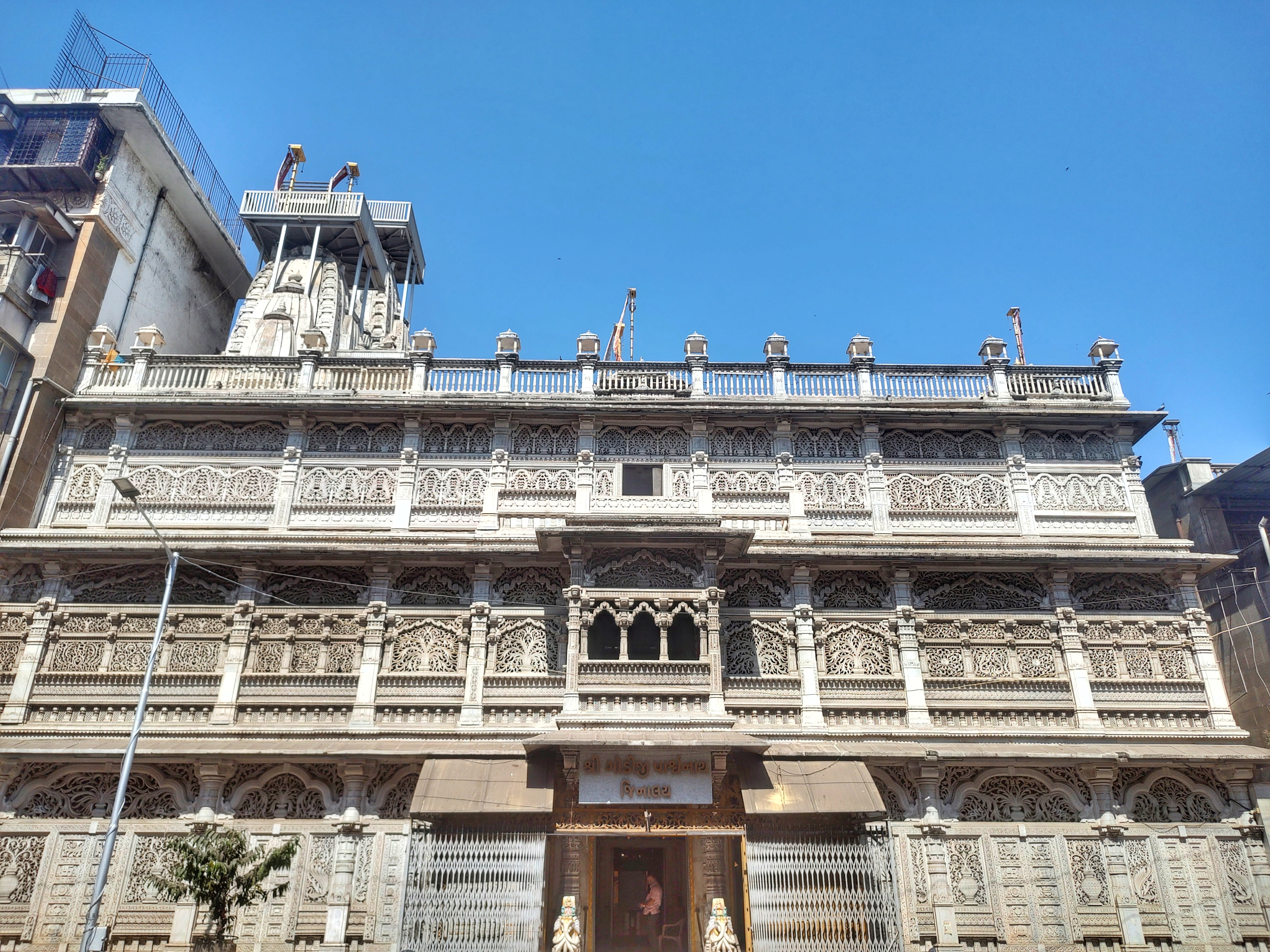
- Shri Godiji Parshwanth temple, Mumbai

- Location within Maharashtra

Religion
- Affiliation: Jainism
- Sect: Śvetāmbara
- Deity: Parsvanath
- Festivals: Posh Dashmi (Parshvanath Birth occasion), Mahavir Jayanti, Paryushan, Diwali, Maun Ekadashi

Location
- Location: Pydhonie, Mumbai, Maharashtra, India
- Interactive map of Shri Godiji Parshwanath, Mumbai
- Coordinates: 18°58′30″N 72°49′33″E

Architecture
- Established: 1812
- Temple: 1

Godiji Parshwanath (Hindi: श्री गोडीजी पार्श्वनाथ) is the name given to several images of the Tirthankara Parshvanantha in India, and to the temple where it is the main deity (mulanayaka). Parshwanath was the 23rd Tirthankara who attained nirvana in 777 BCE. All these images and temples belong to the Śvetāmbara sect of Jainism.

The original image, about 1.5 feet (0.46 m) high, was at Gori in Tharparkar district of Pakistan. The original temple still stands, but is empty. It is in village of Gori between Islamkot and Nagarparkar. Other Godiji temple is located in small village named Kosana in the Jodhpur District Rajasthan donated by the Nagarseth Sri Hastimal Ji Nahar.

== Godiji Parshwanth Temple in Mumbai ==
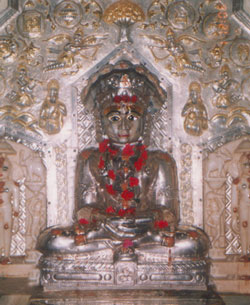
Godiji Parshvanath idol

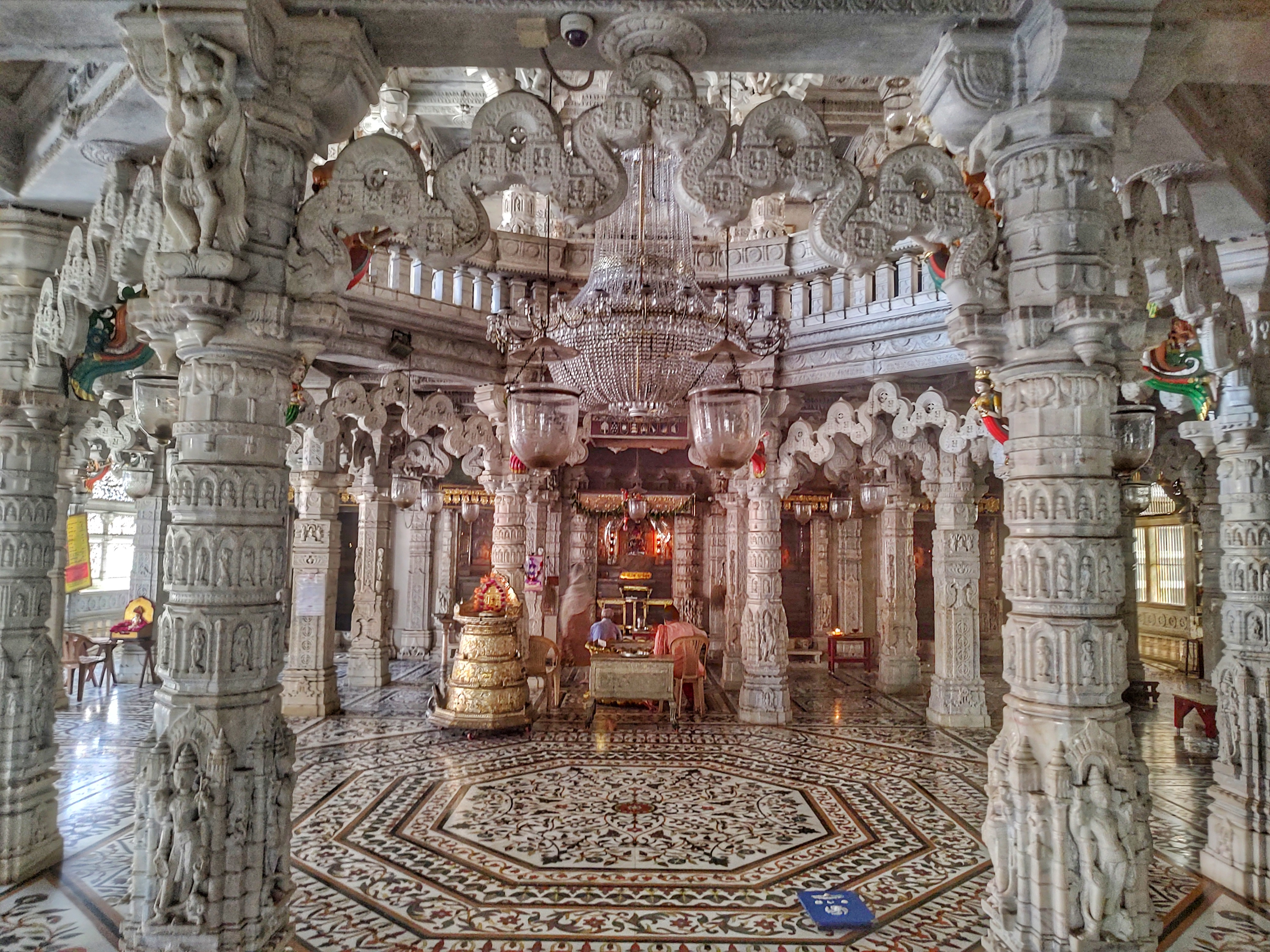
Intricate carving inside the temple

Among the images that bear the name Godiji Parshwanth, the best known is Godiji Parshvanath in the Pydhonie locality of Mumbai.

Seth Amichand of Khambhat settled in Mumbai and constructed a griha jinalaya. The temple was moved in 1803 to Pydhonie locality because of a fire.

Its 200th anniversary was celebrated on 15 April – 12 May 2012. A stamp commemorating this celebration was released by Milind Deora, the then Minister of State for Communications and IT, on 17 April 2012. A four volume directory of ancient manuscripts was also released. The temple organised a community feast for 800,000 individuals. Sweets accompanying an invitation were sent to over 1,34,000 families, and every Jain temple in Mumbai was invited to mark the grand celebration.

== The original Gori Temple in Tharparkar ==
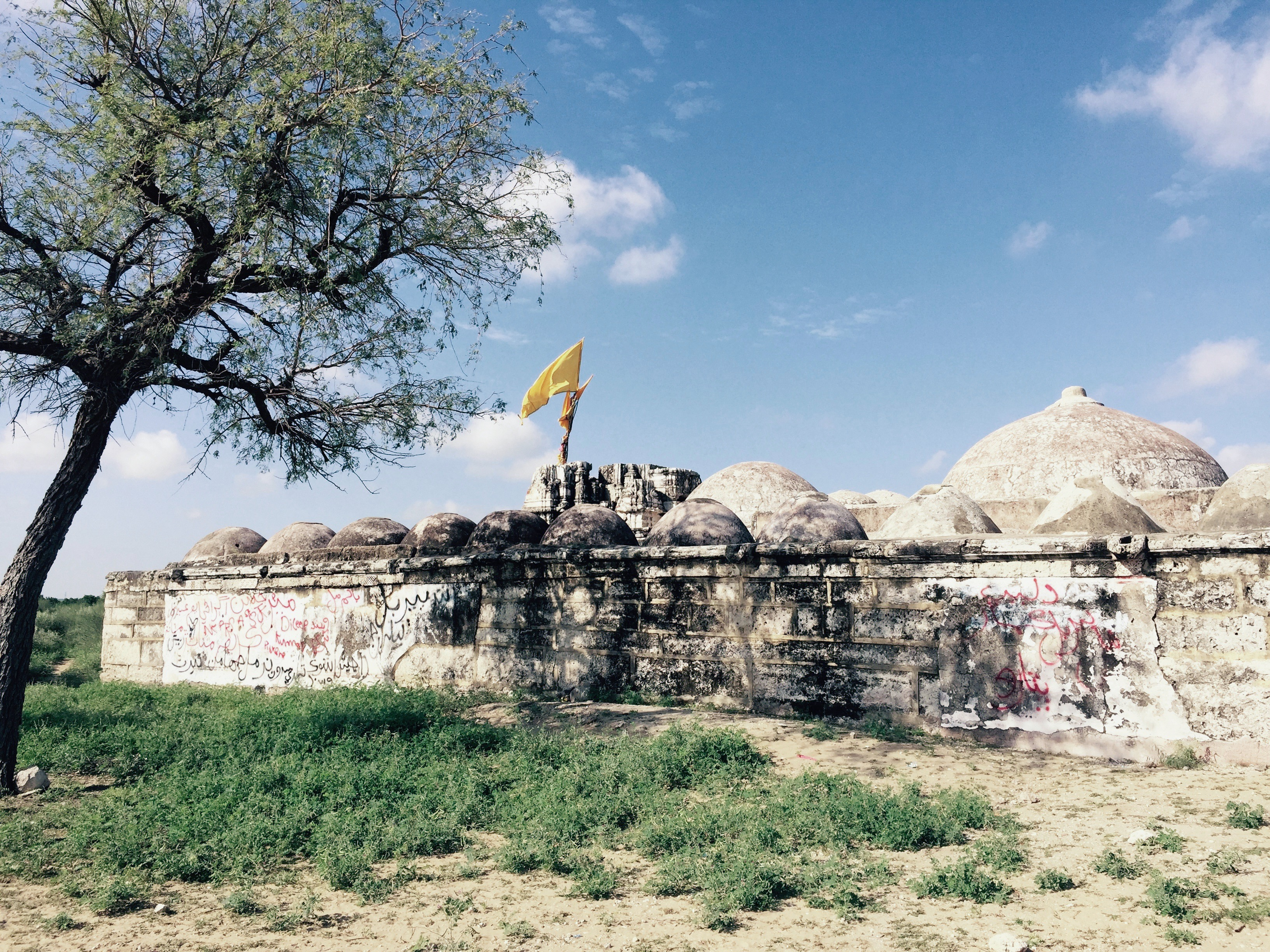
The original Gori Temple with 52 domes, Nagarparkar

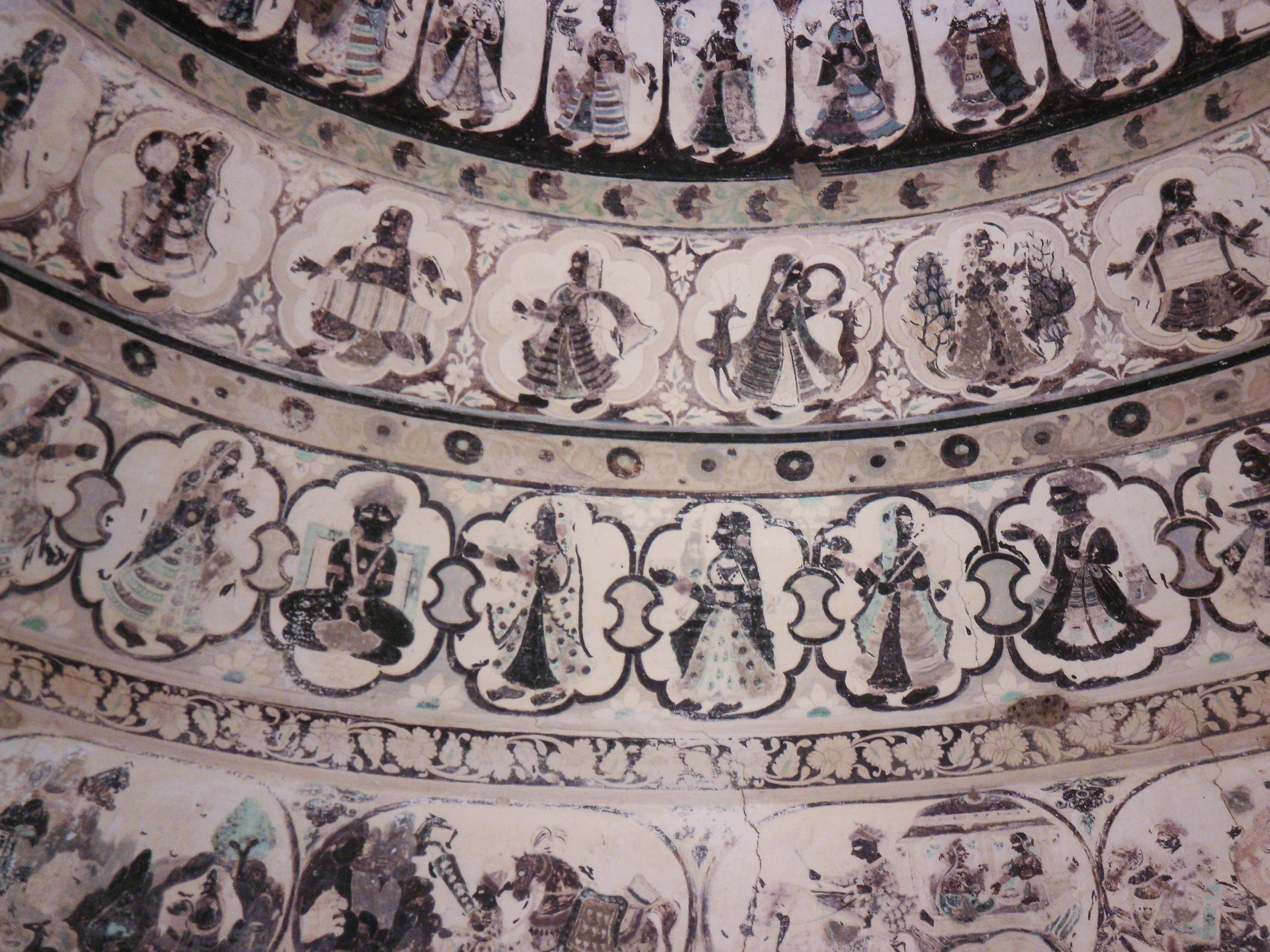
Painted ceiling representing Jain mythology

For several centuries, the temple at Goripur was a celebrated Jain tirtha. It forms part of the collection of worship sites that comprise the Nagarparkar Temples. An account of its building is contained in "Gaudi Parshvanath Stavan" by Pritivimala, composed in Samvat 1650 and "Shri Gaudi Parshvanath Stavan" written by Nemavijaya in Samvat 1807.

According to Muni Darshanvijaya, it was installed by Seth Godidas of Jhinjhuvad and was consecrated by Acharya Hemachandra at Patan in Samvat 1228. It was brought to Patan and was buried underground for safekeeping during a period of disturbance. It was rediscovered in 1375–76 and was stored in the stable of the local ruler.

According to the old texts, a merchant Megha Sa from Nagarparkar acquired the image by paying 125 dramma or 500 pieces (taka) and brought to Nagarparkar, where it was formally reconsecrated by Acharya Merutunga Suri of Anchala Gachchha. Later, according to instructions he received in a dream, he settled a new town at Godipur and constructed a temple in samvat 1444, thus establishing the Godi Parshvanth Tirth. The construction was supervised by an architect from Sirohi. The shikhar of the temple was completed by his son Mahio.

The tirth became famous and was visited by the Jains from afar.

It was visited by Stanley Napier Raikes in 1854. Raikes met local Jains to compile recent history and consulted a Jain Yati Goorjee Kuntvujajee at Bodhesar, who had manuscripts describing the history of the temple.

In 1716, the local chief Soda Sutojee moved the image from the temple to a fort. The image used to be buried underground at a secret location for safekeeping, and used to be taken out time to time with great celebration. Raikes write that thousands of monks and hundreds of thousands of ordinary people assembled for the fairs held in 1764, 1788, 1796, 1810, 1822 and 1824 for the idol's exhibition. In AD 1832, the chief Soda Poonjajee, who was the only person who knew the location of the image, was captured by the ex-Ameers and died in captivity. The image was never seen again.

The temple was later damaged in the battle between Colonel Tyrwhitt and a local Sodha chief, who had taken shelter at the temple.

The temple was inspected the Archaeological Survey of India in 1879. The report refers to it having been built in Samvat 1432. An inscription of 1715 was noted mentioning repairs made.

Jain Muni Vidyavijayaji visited Sindh in 1937. He notes that the temple was empty, and had decayed. A local Bhil served as a guard. At that time there were still many Jain families in towns near Nagarparkar. During India's partition in 1947, the Jains left and the temple became inaccessible to the Jain community.

Gori Temple Architecture: The Gori temple was constructed in the classical medieval style. The main structure (mula prasad) with a shikhara is surrounded by 52 subsidiary shrines (devakulikas), just like the Vimala Vasahi at Mt. Abu. It is termed Dvi-Saptati or Bavan Jinalaya by Nandalal Chunilal Somapura in the Sanskrit text Jina Prasad-Martanda.

== In popular culture ==
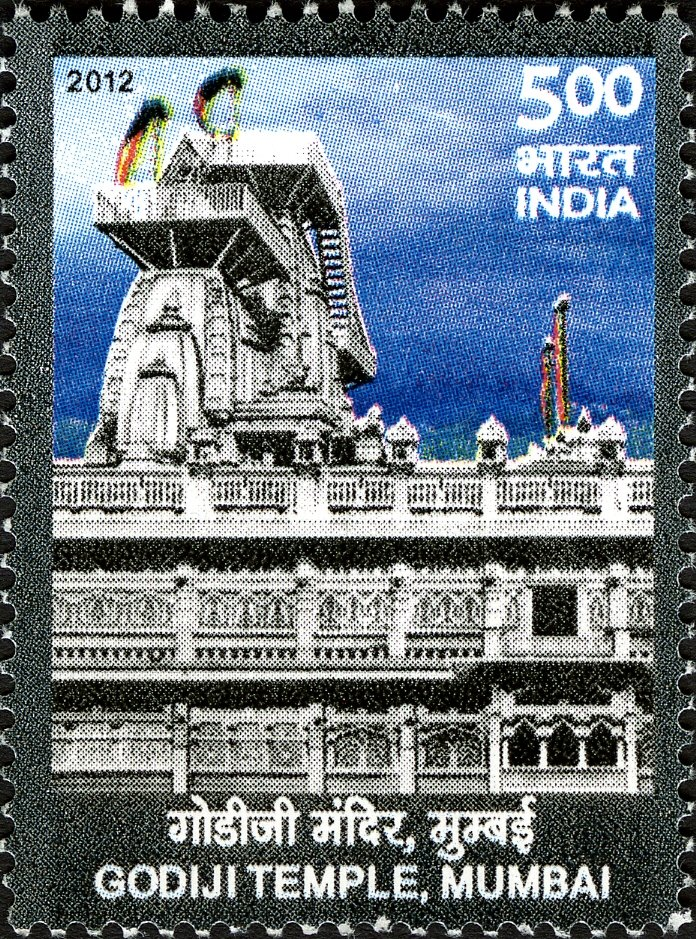
Stamp of Godiji temple issue in 2012

In 2012, a stamp was issued in 2012 to commemorate temple completing 200 years of construction.

== Descendants of the builders ==
According to traditional accounts, compiled in early 20th century by Yati Ramlal Gani, the members of the Gothi clan of Oswals are the descendants of Megha Sa. They now live in various part of India.

== See also ==
- Jain Temples of Nagarparkar and nearby region
- Jainism in Pakistan
- Jainism in Rajasthan
