= Pandit K. Santanam =

Indian freedom fighter

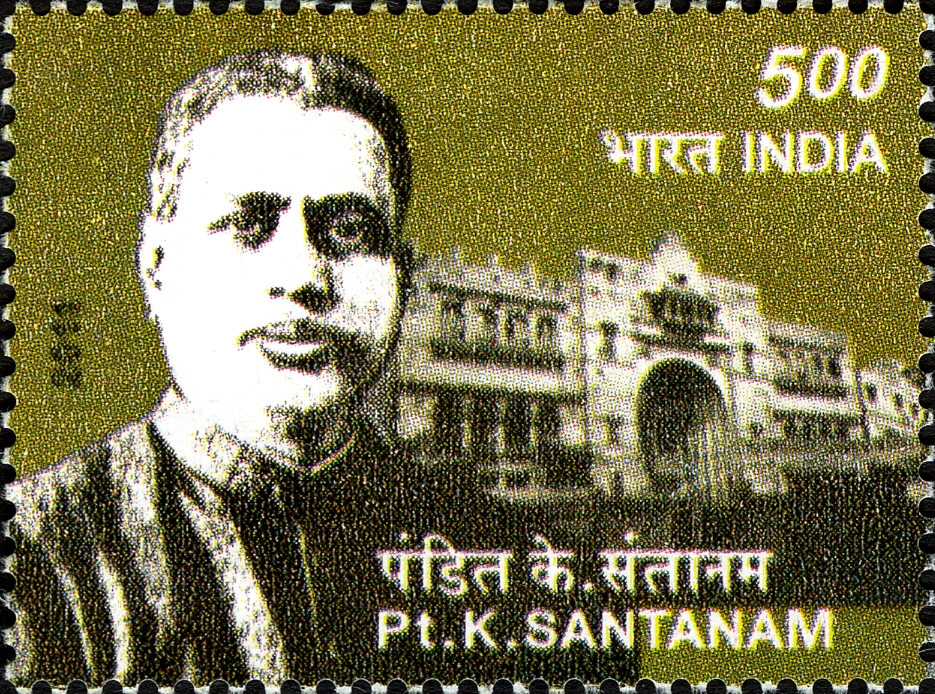
- India Post stamp released in memory of Pandit K. Santanam, 2011
- Born: 25 August 1885; Kumbakonam, Madras Presidency, British India (now Tamil Nadu, India)
- Died: 30 August 1949 (aged 64); New Delhi, NCT of Delhi, Dominion of India (now India)
- Occupations: Lawyer, businessman, politician, freedom fighter
- Political party: Indian National Congress
- Movement: Indian Independence movement
- Spouse: Krishna Atmaram Vedi
- Children: 5 daughters

Pandit K. Santanam (25 August 1885 – 30 August 1949) born in an Iyengar family in Kumbakonam, Madras Presidency was a barrister, politician, businessman and a freedom fighter. He was a close associate of Lala Lajpat Rai and co-founded the Lakshmi Insurance Company which later found its way into the Life Insurance Corporation. He played a key role in the telling the story of Jallianwala Bagh massacre to the nation—something that the government-appointed Hunter Commission had buried.

He was married to Krishna, daughter of Arya Samaj leader Pandit Atamram Vedi.

== Early life ==
Source: Santanam was orphaned early in his childhood. After completing his schooling in Kumbakonam, he graduated from Presidency College, Madras in 1904 with Honours in Economics, with a gold medal in Economics. In 1906, he went to England for higher education at the King's College, Cambridge and made an unsuccessful attempt at the Indian Civil Service (ICS) examination. He was offered a colonial post in the Audit Department which he declined. He soon moved into legal studies and was in 1910 called to the Bar from the Inner Temple. On his return to India in 1911, he chose Lahore as the center of his activities and legal practice.

== Career ==
After his return to Madras from England in 1911, he refused to perform expiation for crossing the sea. His anti-caste attitude did not go well with his family and society at large. Upon Lala Lajpat Rai's suggestion, he chose Lahore as the place to build his career.

He entered politics under the inspiring guidance of Lala Lajpat Rai joined the Congress and held various important offices in the party. In 1920, he threw himself in the non-cooperation movement abandoning his legal profession.

A corps of distinguished patriots of Lahore who plunged into the non-cooperation movement of 1921 found their political inspiration frustrated with its withdrawal. This group headed by Santanam thought it necessary to find new channels for expression of their creative energy, closely aligned to the service of the people. Lala Lajpat Rai, suggested the formation of a life insurance institution which was eminently suited for rendering social service. Lakshmi Insurance Company was formed with Santanam as the managing director, Lala Lajpat Rai as its chairman and Motilal Nehru as its director.

After the Jallianwala Bagh massacre, Martial law was declared across Punjab. As the defence counsel in the case of Lala Harkishen Lal and others, he broke the police cordon which had been thrown around Punjab, and visited Simla to try for an impartial bench to handle the case. Hiding under the birth of a railway compartment occupied by an Englishman, Santanam reached Shimla, the summer capital of the Raj. Though his request for an impartial bench was rejected, he managed to inform Sir C. Sankaran Nair, a member of the Viceroy's Council, of the atrocities being committed under guise of martial law. For leaking the news from Punjab to the rest of the nation, Santanam came under strict police surveillance on his return to Lahore.

Santanam was later named the secretary to the Commission appointed by the Punjab Subcommittee of the Indian National Congress to report on the Punjab disturbances. The report was a model of meticulous documentation and its historic publication chronicled what was later termed by Gandhi to be the "last nail in the coffin of the British Empire."

He served as the general secretary of the Punjab Provincial Congress Committee (1921–22) and president of the Batala, PCC (April 1922). His activities, however, were not confined to the political sphere alone. He was elected Municipal Commissioner of Lahore for the period 1921 to 1923.

Santanam was a proponent of Indian insurance, and was the founder Secretary of the Indian Life Offices Association in 1928-29 and was, thereafter, its president. Between 1944 and 1948, he was a member of the Insurance Advisory Committees. At Lahore, Panditji was a popular figure in the insurance world and was the President of the local insurance society for a number of years.

Heartbroken from the partition, he did yeomen service for the cause of the evacuated offices and their personnel during that time. He formed an association of the displaced insurers, organised relief, moved the authorities to afford facilities for removing the records and properties from Pakistan and actively helped the offices in their resettlement. He was a member of the Advisory Committee to the Ministry of Relief and Rehabilitation, but he never recovered from the trauma of partition.

== Death ==
He died at his residence in Delhi on 30 August 1949, at the age of 64.
