= Ignited Minds =

Book by Abdul Kalam

- Author: A. P. J. Abdul Kalam
- Publication date: 2002
- ISBN: 0-670-04928-X

Ignited Minds: Unleashing the Power Within India (2002, ISBN 0-670-04928-X) is a book written by Dr. A. P. J. Abdul Kalam, President of India from 2002 to 2007.

Dr. Kalam dedicated Ignited Minds to an intermediate school child he met at a school. While talking to students, a question came up: "Who is our enemy?" Kalam recalled that many answers were given, but the one which all agreed upon came from student Snehal Thakkar: "Our enemy is poverty." This small book of 205 pages examines attitudes afflicting Indians today and presents prescriptions for the rapid growth of India to enable the country to emerge as a developed country. Kalam addressed the book to the young citizens of India. The book saw increased demand following the death of Dr. Abdul Kalam in 2015.

== Chapters ==
The book is organized into eleven chapters that address various issues:

1. The Dreams and the Message
2. Give Us a Role Model
3. Visionary Teachers and Scientists
4. Learning from Saints and Seers
5. Patriotism beyond Politics and Religion
6. The Knowledge Society
7. Getting the Forces Together
8. Building a New State
9. To my Countrymen
10. Conclusion
11. Bibliography

== Synopsis ==
- The book begins with a sad note. On 30 September 2001, Kalam’s helicopter, while on its way from Ranchi, Jharkhand state, India to Bokaro crashed. Miraculously, all aboard survived. Kalam was administered a tranquilizer and recalled a vivid dream where he saw himself in a desert "with miles of sand all around," and there stood five men, namely, Caliph Omar (R.A) or Umar, Emperor Ashoka, Mahatma Gandhi, Albert Einstein and Abraham Lincoln. Kalam felt dwarfed by their presence and recollects words of these great personalities. In this chapter, Kalam has written "Dream, dream, dream: dreams transform into thoughts, and thoughts result in action."
- The second chapter emphasizes the importance of parents and elementary school teachers as role models.
- The third chapter talks about modern Indian visionaries such as J. R. D. Tata, Vikram Sarabhai, Satish Dhawan and Dr. Verghese Kurien.
- The next section of the book deals with the spiritual heritage of the Indian nation and talks about formulating a model of development based on India's inherent strengths.
- The fifth chapter of the book exhorts the Indians, constituting a nation of one billion people with multitude faiths and ideologies to develop a singular national vision and amalgamate into one national forum.
- The next chapter begins with a Thirukkural, which states:
  "Wisdom is a weapon to ward off destruction;
  It is an inner fortress which enemies cannot destroy."
- The caption line of the seventh chapter is followed by the following inspiring words of Abraham Lincoln:
  "Determine that things can and shall be done, and then we shall find the way."
- The eighth chapter exhorts for a change in the mindset and to take pragmatic risks which shall result in success.
- The last chapter "To My Countrymen" begins with a quote from Nobel laureate Rabindranath Tagore: "Let my country awaken."
- The book ends with a "Song of Youth" with these opening words:
  "As a young citizen of India,
  Armed with technology and love for my nation,
  I realize, a small aim is a crime."

== See also ==
- India 2020
