= Mangavilai =

- Village
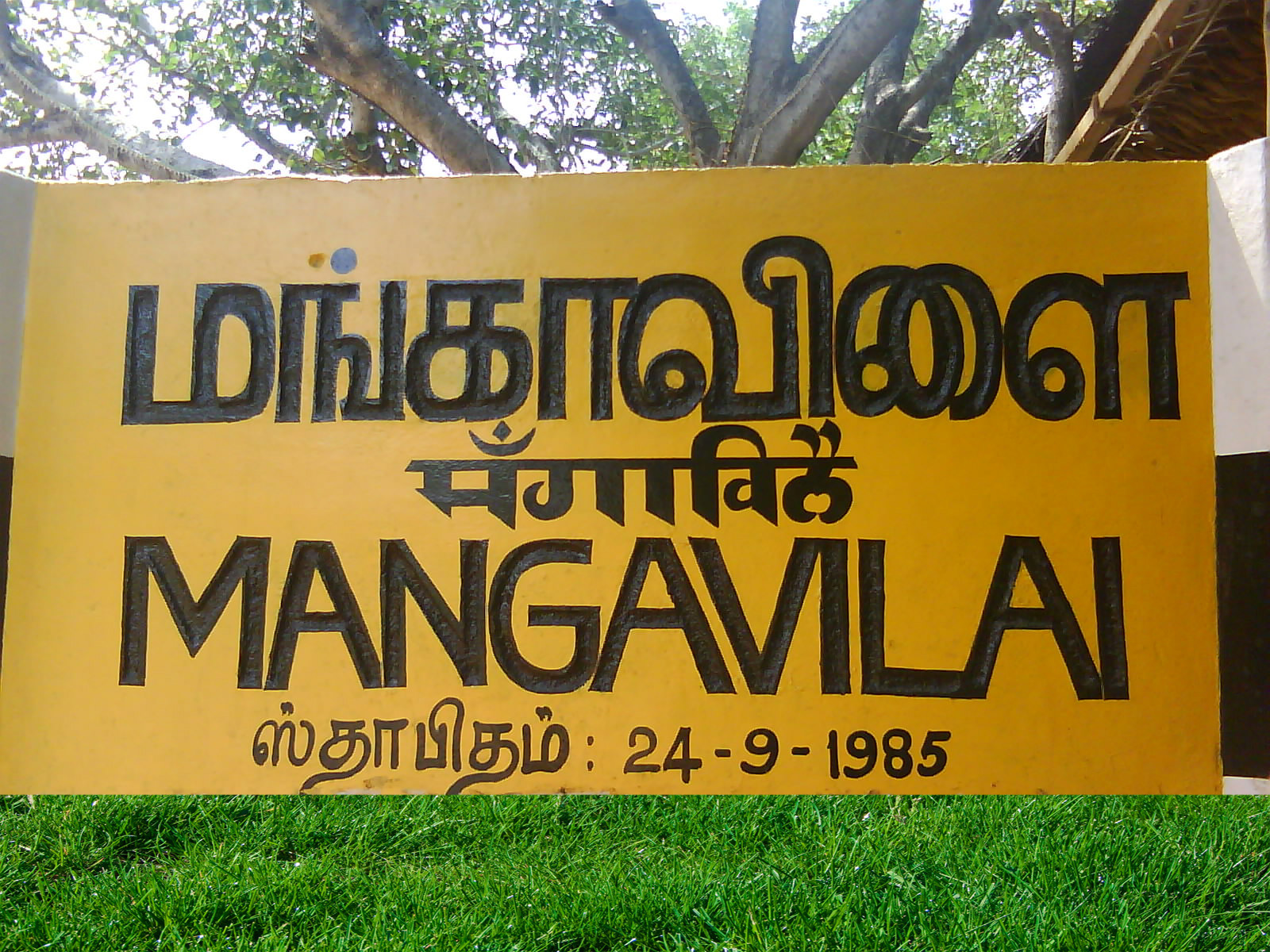
- Mangavilai

- Location in Tamil Nadu, India Mangavilai (India)
- Coordinates: 8.23°N 77.35°E
- Country: India
- State: Tamil Nadu
- District: Kanyakumari district

Government
  - Village Head: K. Jegan.
  - Designer: T. Venkateswaran
  - Supported By: P. Vaikunda Raja
  - Assisted By: K. Bala Murugan

Population
  - Total: above 1,200

Languages
  - Official: Tamil
- Time zone: UTC+5:30 (IST)
- PIN: 629501
- Telephone code: 91-4652
- Vehicle registration: TN-74
- Lok Sabha constituency: Kanyakumari
- Vidhan Sabha constituency: Kanyakumari

Mangavilai is a village in Kanyakumari district of Tamil Nadu, India. It is administered under Dharmapuram Panchayat, and is located 9 km away from Nagercoil, the district headquarters of Kanyakumari. The name Mangavilai means 'indestroyable fame'.

== History ==
Mangavilai is a village with a population of about 1,000 people in the Kanyakumari district. The city is one of only few in the Kanyakumari district with an entrance sign featuring three or more languages (in the case of Mangavilai: Hindi, Tamil, and English).

The village has seen success in the sphere of politics, with village members serving at the Member of Parliament level. Village member M.C. Balan served in the Rajyasabha, and is also notable for launching an ultimately unsuccessful 1972 bid to contest the seat held by former Tamil Nadu CM Shri K. Kamaraj.

== Village and surroundings ==
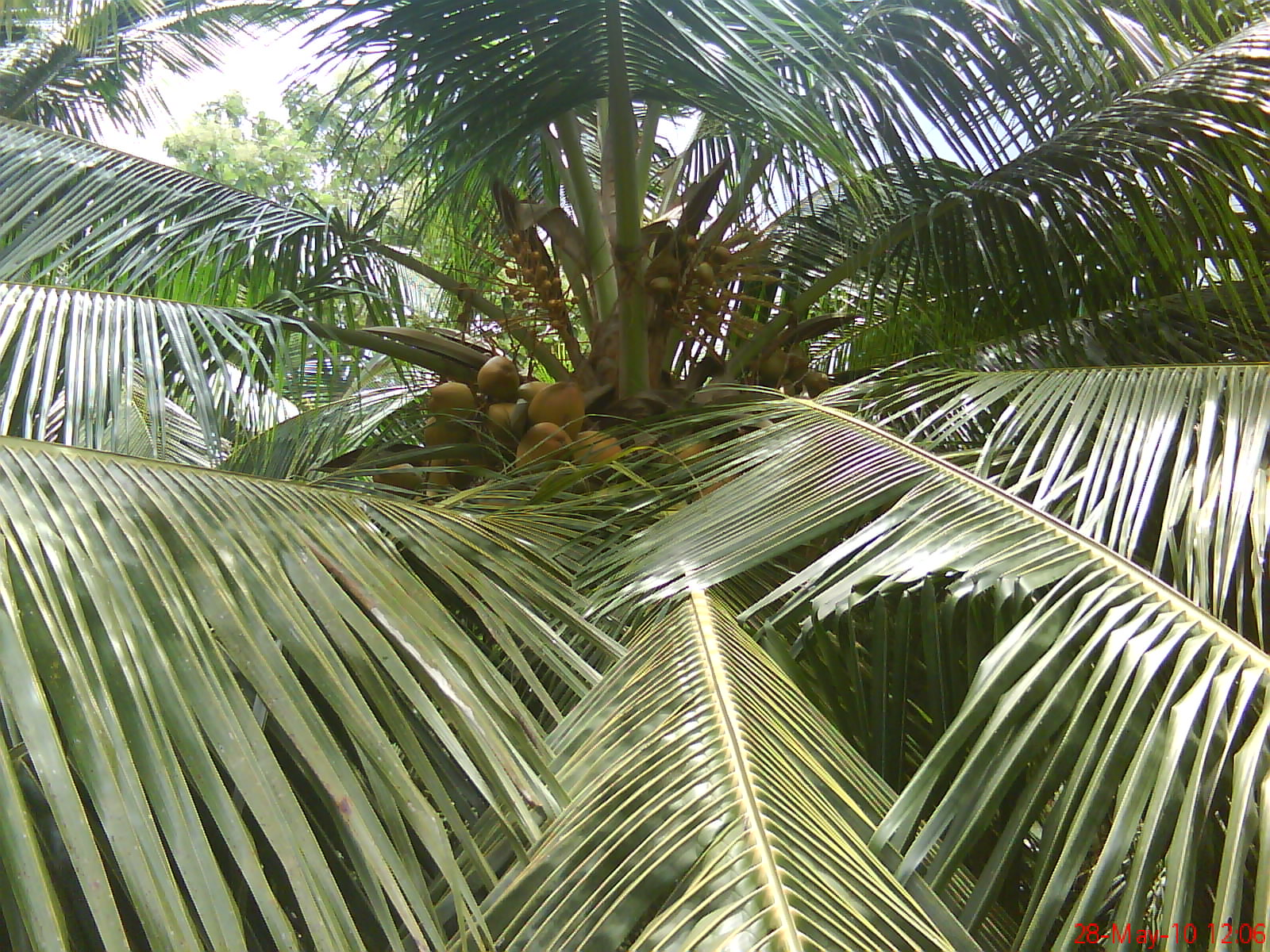
COCONUT TREE, Mangavilai

Mangavilai is situated 1 km from the coast of the Arabian Sea. It is 9 km from Nagercoil, the district Headquarters, and 20 km from Kanyakumari, the southernmost point in mainland India. It is surrounded by several other small villages including Pilavilai to the north, Neduvilai to the east, Kaliyayanvilai to the south, and Puthoor and Panavilai to the west. Mangavilai is administered under Dharmapuram Panchayat.

== Temples History ==
Siva Sudalai Maadan Kovil

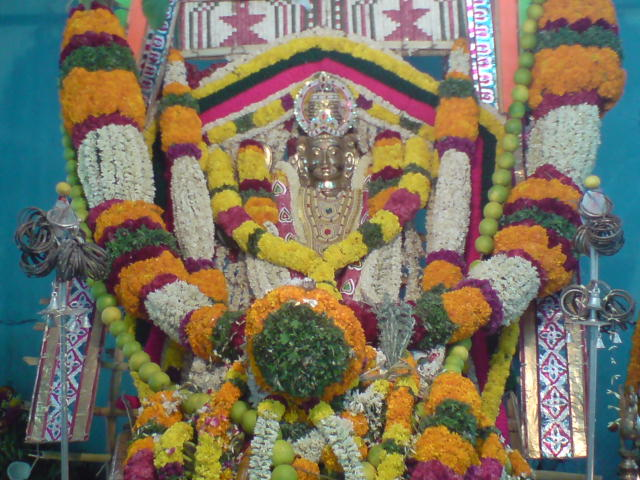
Siva Sudalai Maadan Kovil, Mangavilai

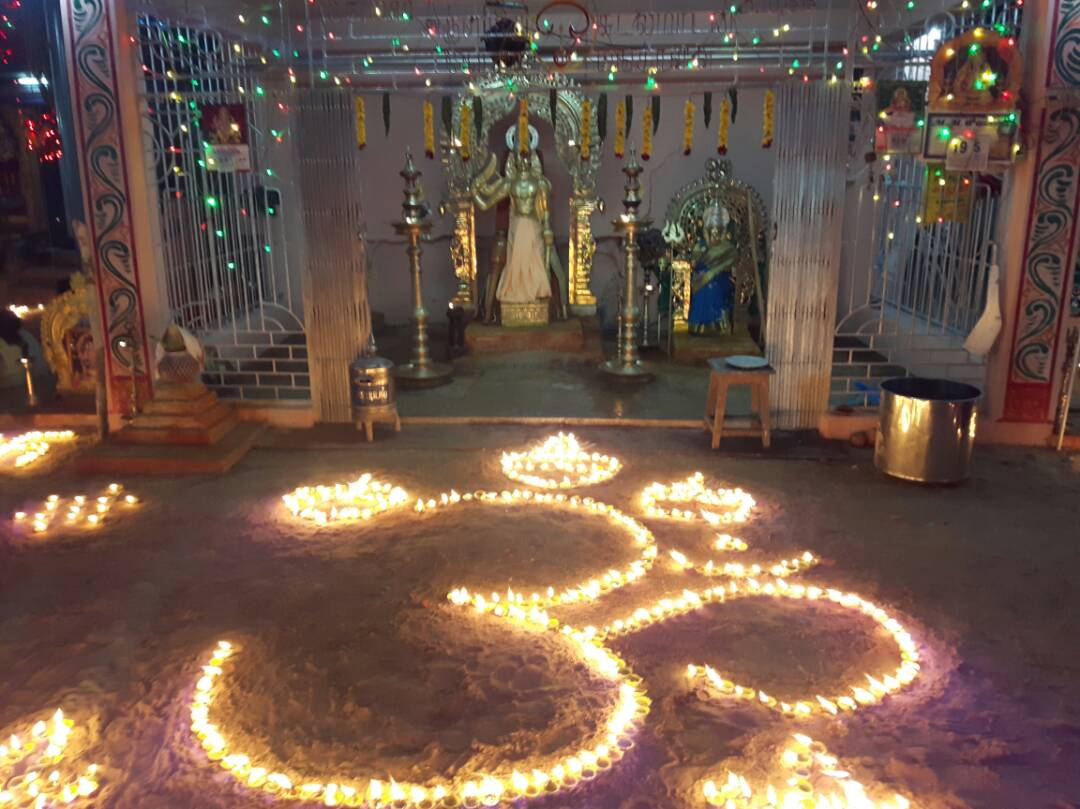
Elumicham Pazha Vilaku Poojai, Mangavilai

This is a Hindu Temple located in the Mangavilai village. Shri Siva Sudalai Maadan Temple belongs to the whole village. It is situated directly in the center of the village.

Vinayagar Temple

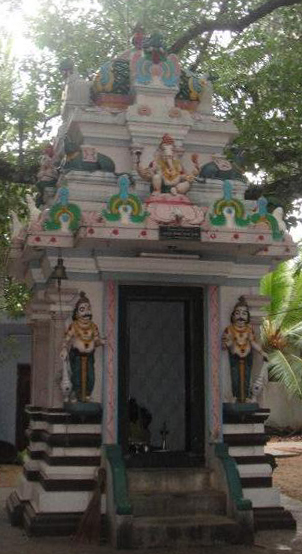
Vinayagar Temple, Mangavilai

This is a famous temple, which is present inside Siva Sudalai Swamy temple.

Arunachaleswar Temple

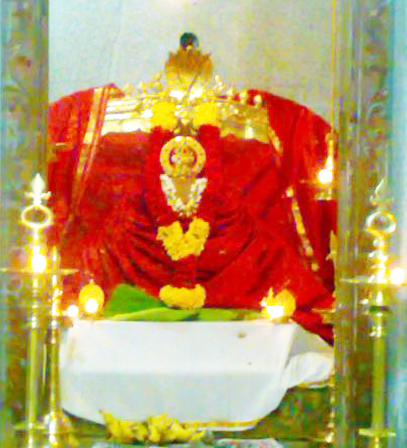
Arunachaleswar Temple, Mangavilai

This is a family temple, which is present in the north side of Siva Sudalai Maadan temple

Isakki Amman Temple

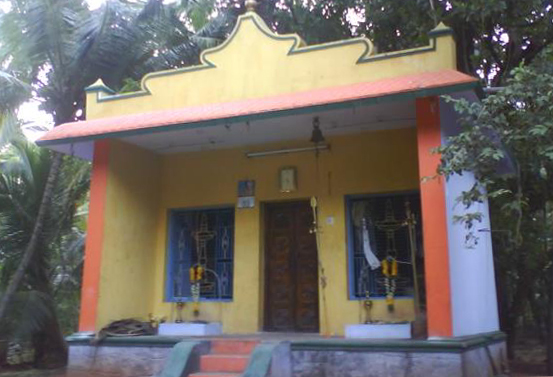
Isaki Amman Temple, Mangavilai

This is a family temple, which is present on the west side of Shiva Sudalai Maadan temple.

Ayya Vaikundar Temple

This is a family temple, which is present in the west of Isakki Amman temple.

== Culture and religion ==
Most residents of Mangavilai follow Hinduism and belong to the Nadar caste.

== Education ==
The literacy rate is 100% and newspapers are popular. Village facilities include a library whose reading room features more than 15 weekly and monthly magazines, as well as a sports complex for use by local youths. The library provides educational and employment services through various consultants and documents. The village organizes an annual meeting of employed villagers for the purpose of village development and cultivating leaders to develop education resources.

The village produces many doctors, engineers, lawyers, college professors, and government employees, including personnel in State Administrative Service as well as in military or paramilitary service. Today, the village has one government employee in each household.

== Climate ==
The maximum temperature during summer hovers around 86 °F or 30 °C. Mangavilai receives both the North-East and South-West monsoons.

== Social Welfare Club ==
- Nethaji Youth Club (NYC), Mangavilai
NYC Function - 26th January 2022 - Photo Gallery
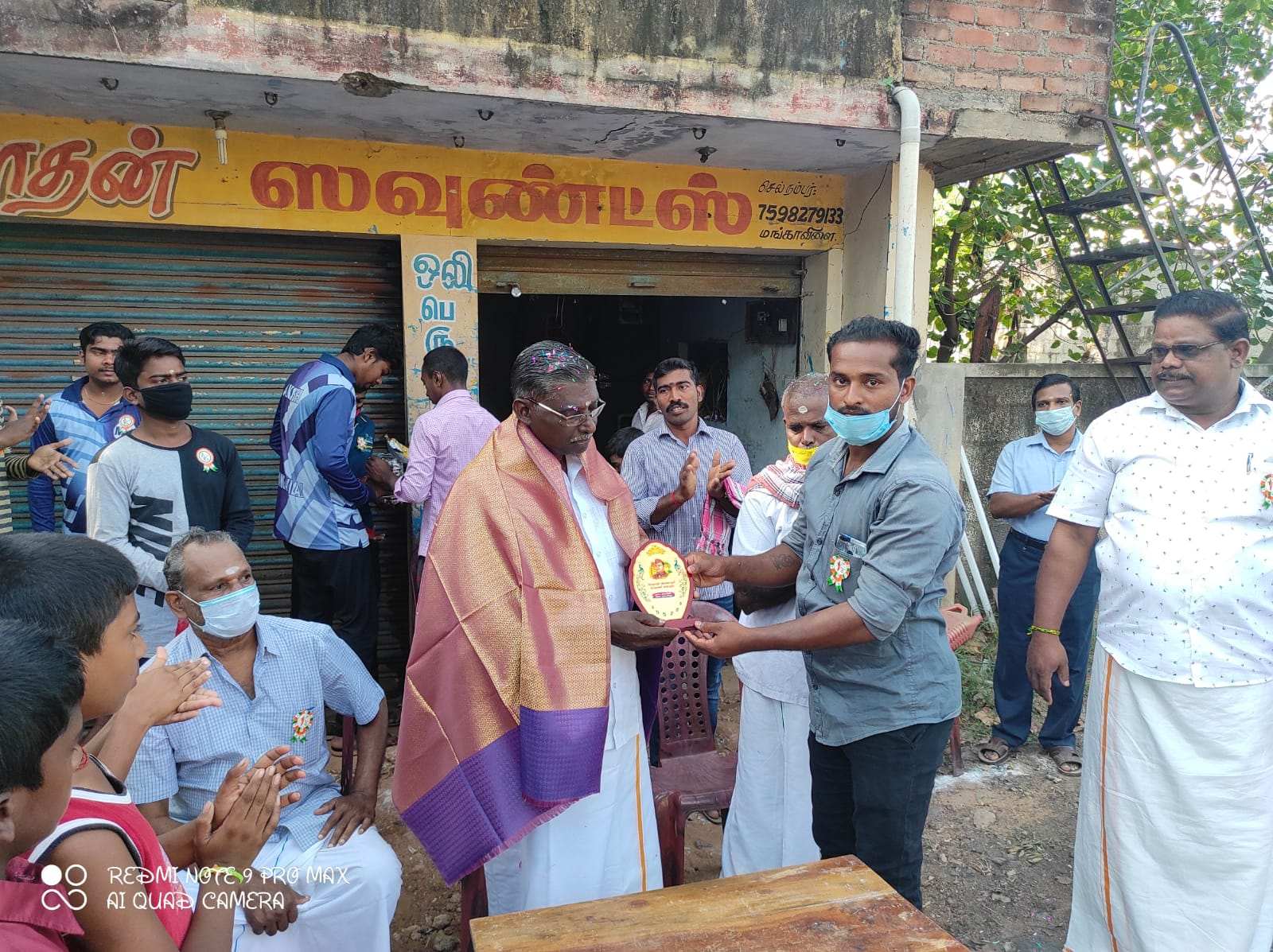
Honour to the Chief Guest
- Gandhiji Youth Club (GYC), Mangavilai

== Kabadi Club ==
Siva Sudalaimaada Swamy Kabadi Club (SSS Kabadi Club)

== See also ==
- Kanyakumari
- Nagercoil
- Suchindram

== Schools ==
- Saraswathi Vidyalaya Matriculation School, Mangavilai
