= Pratap Narayan Mishra =

Hindi litterateur

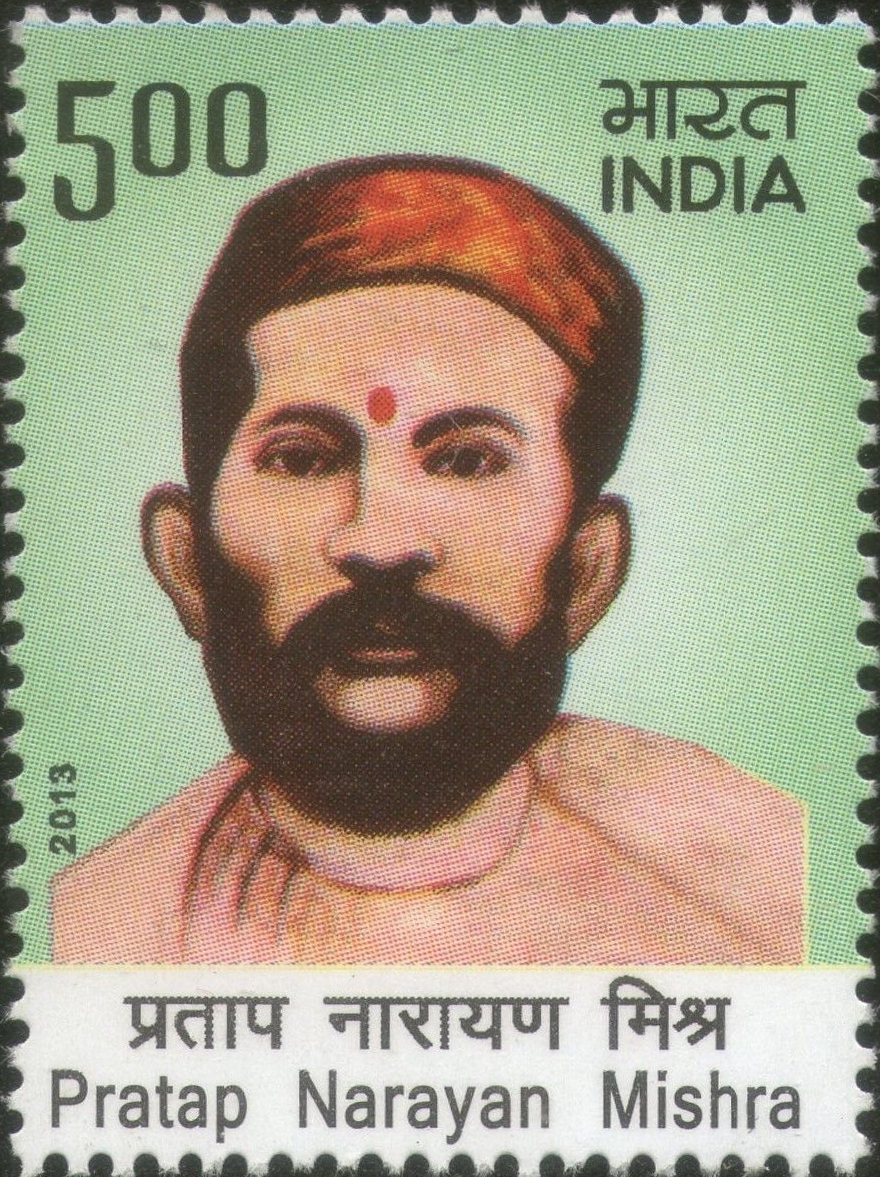
Pratap Narayan Mishra on a 2013 stamp of India

Pratap Narayan Mishra (24 September 1856 – 6 July 1894) was a Hindi essayist in British India. He is famous for exhorting all Indians to chant and believe in "Hindi, Hindu, Hindustan".

His famous literary works were Lokokti Shatak, Shriprem Puran, Prarthana Shatak, Kaut, Trupantam, Hathi Hammir, Braidala Swagat and Kanpur Mahamatya.
