= India 2020 =

1998 book by A. P. J. Abdul Kalam and Y. S. Rajan

India 2020: A Vision for the New Millennium
- Book cover
- Author: A. P. J. Abdul Kalam; Y. S. Rajan
- Language: English
- Genre: Non-fiction
- Published: 1998
- Publication place: India
- Media type: Paper
- Pages: 344
- ISBN: 9780143423683 ISBN13
- Followed by: Ignited Minds

India 2020: A Vision for the New Millennium is a book, written by the 11th President of India A. P. J. Abdul Kalam and Y. S. Rajan. The book was written by the duo in the year 1998, before Kalam's tenure as president. It talks about Kalam's prediction for India's future and for developing India.

== Overview ==
The book examines in depth the weaknesses and strengths of India, and offers a vision of how India can emerge to be among the world's top four economic powers by the year 2020. The Vision is dedicated to a ten-year-old girl whom Kalam met during one of his talks and asked her about her ambitions, to which the young girl replied, "I want to live in a developed India."

In his book India 2020, Kalam strongly advocates an action plan to develop India into a strong nation by the year 2020. He regards his nation as a knowledge superpower and developed nation. The book describes the present and future scenario in India and developed countries. It compares the various statistical data and explains how India can improve it. Kalam explains the importance of science and technology for the development of India.

In chapter 1 of the book the authors stress the importance of a vision for India, using nations like US, China, Malaysia, and Israel as examples. However, they also point out that this vision should be original, rather than imitating other nations.

In the book, Kalam had also said that it should be the dream of all the citizens to see India as a developed country.

== Reception ==
According to The Times of India, "Seldom does one, in these troubled times, see such a lucid marshaling of facts and figures to bolster the thesis that India is mere two decades away from super-power status". The Statesman reviewed the book as, "A book of revelation in a plain wrapper".

The book has been translated into multiple languages.

In 2025, India became the fourth largest economy in the world.

== See also ==
- Ignited Minds: Unleashing the Power Within India, a follow-up by Kalam written in 2002
- Target 3 Billion, book about rural development by Kalam and Srijan Pal Singh
