= Kottaram =

- Village
- Kottaram, Tamil Nadu
- Coordinates: 8°06′59.8″N 77°31′23.5″E
- Country: India
- State: Tamil Nadu
- District: Kanyakumari
- Elevation: 48 m (157 ft)

Population (2001)
  - Total: 9,450

Languages
  - Official: Tamil
- Time zone: UTC+5:30 (IST)
- Postal code: 629703

Kottaram is a village located in Kanyakumari district in the Indian state of Tamil Nadu. Kottaram the word origin from Malayalam/Tamil meaning Palace. So Kottaram means not only a village but also a Palace because 18th & the beginning of the 19th century Kottaram village was ruled by Travancore Maharajas and they have constructed Guest Houses for them. In 1947 August 15 India got independence from British and Sri Vallabhai Pattel initiated to divided India as States and the states divided into Districts according to the regional language and the present Kottaram village became part of Tamil Nadu by 1 November 1956.

This village used to be a resting place for the Travancore Maharajas. This landmark, called the Chathiram (Free lodge), is occupied by businesses now. A government hospital, Sub-Register office, and Post Office are the main landmarks in the junction. There is also the small Ram temple that was built at Nandavanam (Garden of flowers). There are several temples and churches in Kottaram.

People from surrounding villages flock to Kottaram. It is very close to Kanyakumari, Vattakottai, and Marunthuvazh Malai. The Government fruit farm and a bi-weekly farmers market (Thali Aruthaan Chanthai) are also present nearby.

== Demographics ==
As of 2001 India census, Kottaram had a population of 9450. Males constitute 49% of the population and females 51%. Kottaram has an average literacy rate of 84%, higher than the national average of 59.5%: male literacy is 87%, and female literacy is 82%. In Kottaram, 9% of the population is under 6 years of age. All the people here are either Tamil or Malayalam speaking.

== Schools in Kottaram ==
- The "Government Higher Secondary School" has produced many scientists, engineers, doctors and other professionals.
- There is a school for Deaf and Dumb run by CSI at the Mission Compound.
- Mahendra nursery & primary school
- CSI Nursery And Primary School run by the Kanyakumari CSI Diocese in church campus.

== Hospitals in Kottaram ==
- Government Primary Health Center
- Kandaswamy Hospital [Dr. Kandaswamy]
- Rajasekaran Hospital [Dr.P.A.RajaSekaran]
- Chitra Hospital [Dr.P.A.RajaSekaran]
- AJ Hospital [Dr.Jayan, Dr.Jenet]
- Kuttikan Memorial Homoeo Clinic [Dr. Christin Ebenezar.R.]
- Neela Hospital [Dr.Krithika]
- Kumaraswamy Hospital [Perumalpuram]
- Veterinary hospital for animals.
