= Kanyakumari Glass bridge =

Kanyakumari Glass bridge sea glass bridge
- Coordinates: 8.0779°N 77.5545°E
- Crosses: sea
- Locale: Kanyakumari, Tamil Nadu, India
- Begins: Vivekananda Rock Memorial
- Ends: Thiruvalluvar Statue

Characteristics
- Material: Steel & cast iron
- Trough construction: toughened glass & polymer
- Pier construction: concrete slab
- Width: 10 m
- Longest span: 77 m

History
- Construction end: December 2024
- Construction cost: ₹37 crore
- Opened: yes
- Inaugurated: 30 December 2024

Location
- Interactive map of Kanyakumari Glass bridge

Kanyakumari Glass bridge or Kanyakumari Glass fibre footover bridge is an footover bridge built for pedestrians to cross the sea connecting Vivekananda Rock Memorial and Thiruvalluvar Statue both constructed on sea in Kanyakumari of Kanyakumari district in Tamil Nadu, India. This is said to be the India's first glass bridge built on sea.

== Location ==
This glass bridge is located with the geographic coordinates of (8.0779°N 77.5545°E) on the sea in Kanyakumari.

Kanyakumari Glass bridge (Tamil Nadu)

== Details ==
This glass bridge is constructed having a breadth of 10 m and a span of 77 m, at a cost of about ₹37 crore. This bridge is of the shape of a bowstring arch. And the bridge was inaugurated on 30 December 2024 by the Chief Minister of Tamil Nadu MK Stalin.
