= Peyode =

- Village
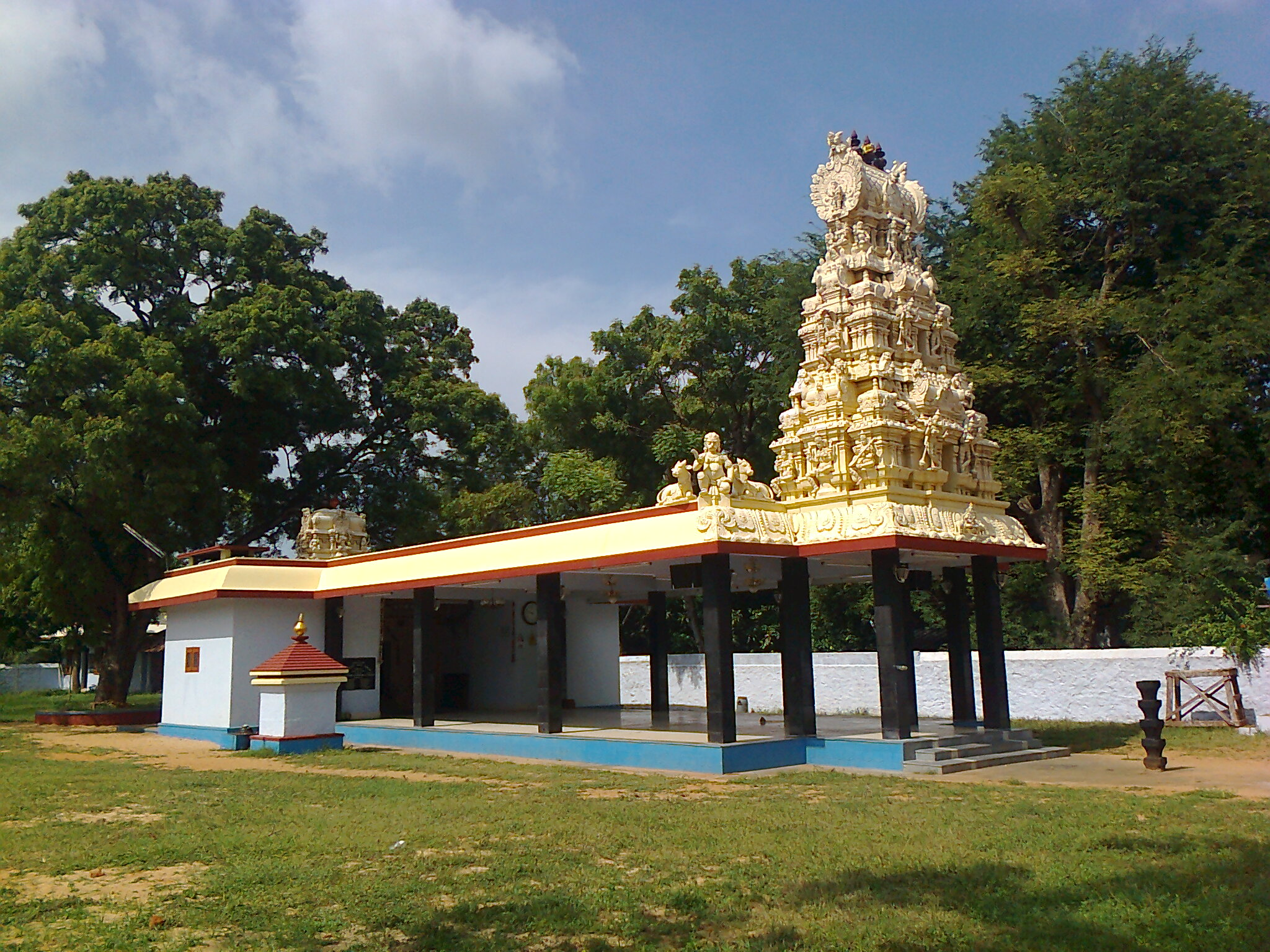
- Bhadrakali Amman temple

- Location within Tamil Nadu
- Coordinates: 8.1554°N 77.3578°E
- Country: India
- State: Tamil Nadu
- District: Kanyakumari

Government
  - District Collector: Thiru.Sh. Sajjansingh R Chavan, IAS

Languages
  - Official: Tamil
- Time zone: UTC+5:30 (IST)
- PIN: 629 201
- Telephone code: 914651
- Vehicle registration: TN 74 & TN 75
- Website: www.peyode.blogspot.in

Peyode is located near Nagercoil, a suburb of Kanyakumari in the Indian state of Tamil Nadu. It is a southern suburb of Kanyakumari city, located on Nagercoil-Colachel SH 46. Nearby places are Rajakkamangalam, Vellichanthai and Muttom.

== Demographics ==
As of 2001 India census, Peyode had a population of 586. Males constitute 50% of the population and females 50%. Peyode has an average literacy rate of 73%, higher than the national average of 59.5%: male literacy is 79%, and female literacy is 67%. In Peyode, 10% of the population is under 6 years of age.

Peyode is situated approximately 8 km south of Kanyakumari city center, making it accessible to surrounding localities such as Rajakkamangalam and Vellichanthai.

== Attractions ==
The Bhadrakali Amman temple in Peyode is located at the center of the town. The 'Guru Thavasi Iyaa' clan of people lived at Peyode. Every year car festival is celebrated during May. This temple holds minute art works portraying the Tamil heritage. And the daily poojas are similar to Thirupathi. A village called Rajakkamangalam (3 kilometers away from Peyode) is also getting popular because of its natural environment, sea and agricultural lands. Agriculture is the main activity in and around Peyode. The farmers' market is held every Friday at Vellichanthai.

== Climate ==
Peyode has a pleasant, though humid, climate for a major part of the year. The maximum temperature during the summer hovers around 86 °F or 30 °C with moderate humidity at times. Peyode is the only Indian town to receive both the north-east monsoon and the south-west monsoon. It rains more often in Kanyakumari district than in any other part of Tamil Nadu. Due to geographical conditions, the southern tip of Kanyakumari is generally 2 °C to 3 °C hotter than Peyode during the daytime, though Kanyakumari is only 20 km away.

== Language ==
Tamil is official language in Peyode. Tamil language along with English is used as a medium of teaching in all major schools. The Tamil spoken here is a mix of Malayalam and Tamil, sometimes unintelligible to the people of North Tamil Nadu. The culture is a mixture of Tamil and Malayalam culture and traditions. Hinduism, Christianity and Islam are the major religions in the town and district.

Food prepared here is also a mix of Kerala/Tamil Nadu traditions. Puttu, Appam, Idiappam are popular food items and so are rice murukku, and achu-murukku. Curries here are made with coconut and coconut oil which is now considered Kerala style cooking. Some of the festivals celebrated here are Pongal, Onam, Suchindrum "Ther Festival", Ayya Vaikunda Avataram, Deepavali, Easter, Christmas, New Year, St. Francis Xavier's feast, Bhagavathy Amman Temple festival, Ramzan (Eid ul fitr) and Bakrid (Eid ul alha).
