= Thiruvalluvar Statue =

Stone sculpture in Tamil Nadu, India

Thiruvalluvar Statue திருவள்ளுவர் சிலை
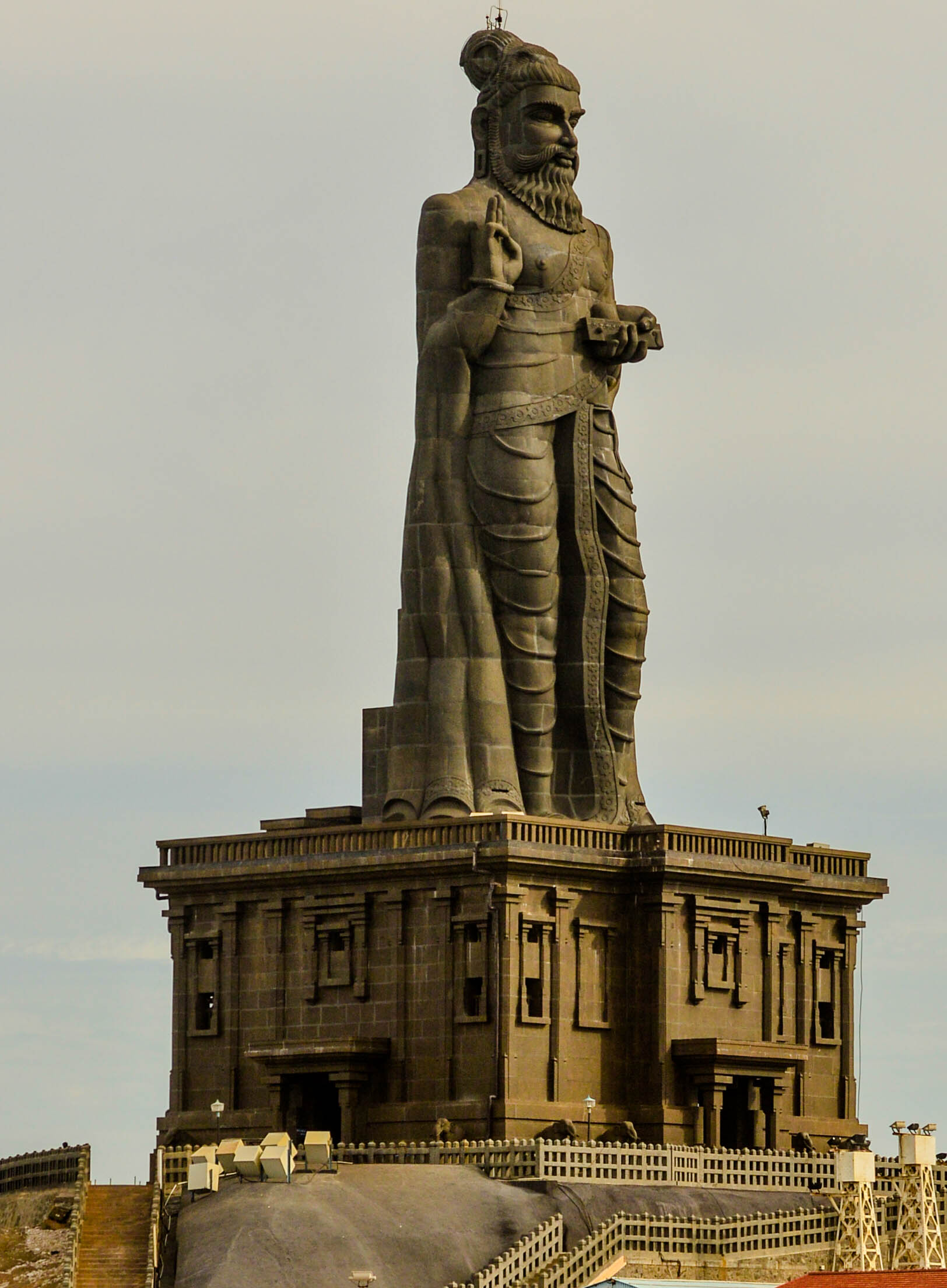
- Thiruvalluvar Statue in Kanyakumari
- Interactive map of Thiruvalluvar Statue திருவள்ளுவர் சிலை
- Location: Kanyakumari, Tamil Nadu, India
- Coordinates: 8.0777°N 77.5539°E
- Designer: V. Ganapati Sthapati
- Type: Monument (statue)
- Material: Stone and concrete
- Height: 40.6 m (133 ft)
- Beginning date: 7 September 1990
- Completion date: 1999
- Opening date: 1 January 2000
- Dedicated to: Valluvar, author of the Kural text

The Thiruvalluvar Statue, or Valluvar Statue, is a 40.6-metre-tall (133 ft) stone sculpture of Tamil poet and philosopher Valluvar, known as Thiruvalluvar, the author of the Thirukkural, an ancient Tamil work on morality. It is atop a small island near the town of Kanniyakumari on the southernmost point of the Indian peninsula in the state of Tamil Nadu, India, where the Bay of Bengal, the Arabian Sea and the Indian Ocean meet. The statue was sculpted by Indian sculptor V. Ganapati Sthapati, who also created the Iraivan Temple, and was unveiled on the millennium day of 1 January 2000 by then Chief Minister M. Karunanidhi. It is currently the 25th tallest statue in India. During its silver jubilee celebrations on 1 January 2025, the Government of Tamil Nadu declared the statue as the "Statue of Wisdom".

== Description ==
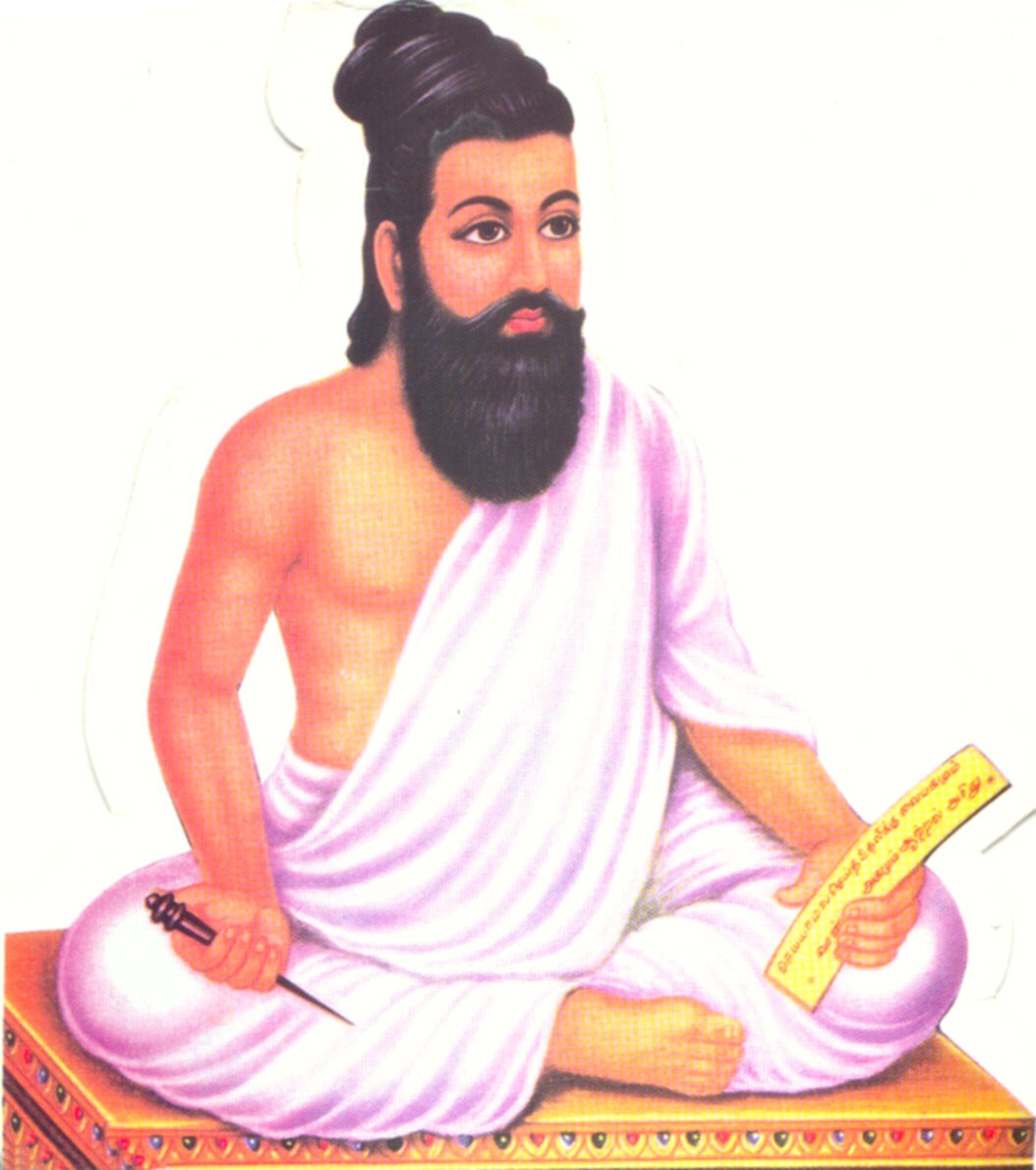
Poet Thiruvalluvar

The combined height of the statue and pedestal is 133 feet (41 metres), denoting the 133 chapters of the Thirukkural. This includes a 95-foot (29-metre) sculpture of Valluvar standing upon a 38-foot (12-metre) pedestal that represents the 38 chapters of Virtue, the first of the three books of the Kural text. The statue itself represents the second and third books of the Kural text, namely, Wealth and Love. The whole design signifies that wealth and love be earned and enjoyed on the foundation of solid virtue. The right hand of the statue with three fingers pointing skywards signifies the three cantos of the Kural text, namely, Aram, Porul, and Inbam (Virtue, Wealth, and Love, respectively), combined. The head of the statue stands at a height of 61 metres (200 ft) above the sea level.

The statue, with its slight bend around the waist is reminiscent of a dancing pose of the Hindu deities like Nataraja. The statue weighs 7,000 tonnes (6,900 long tons; 7,700 short tons).

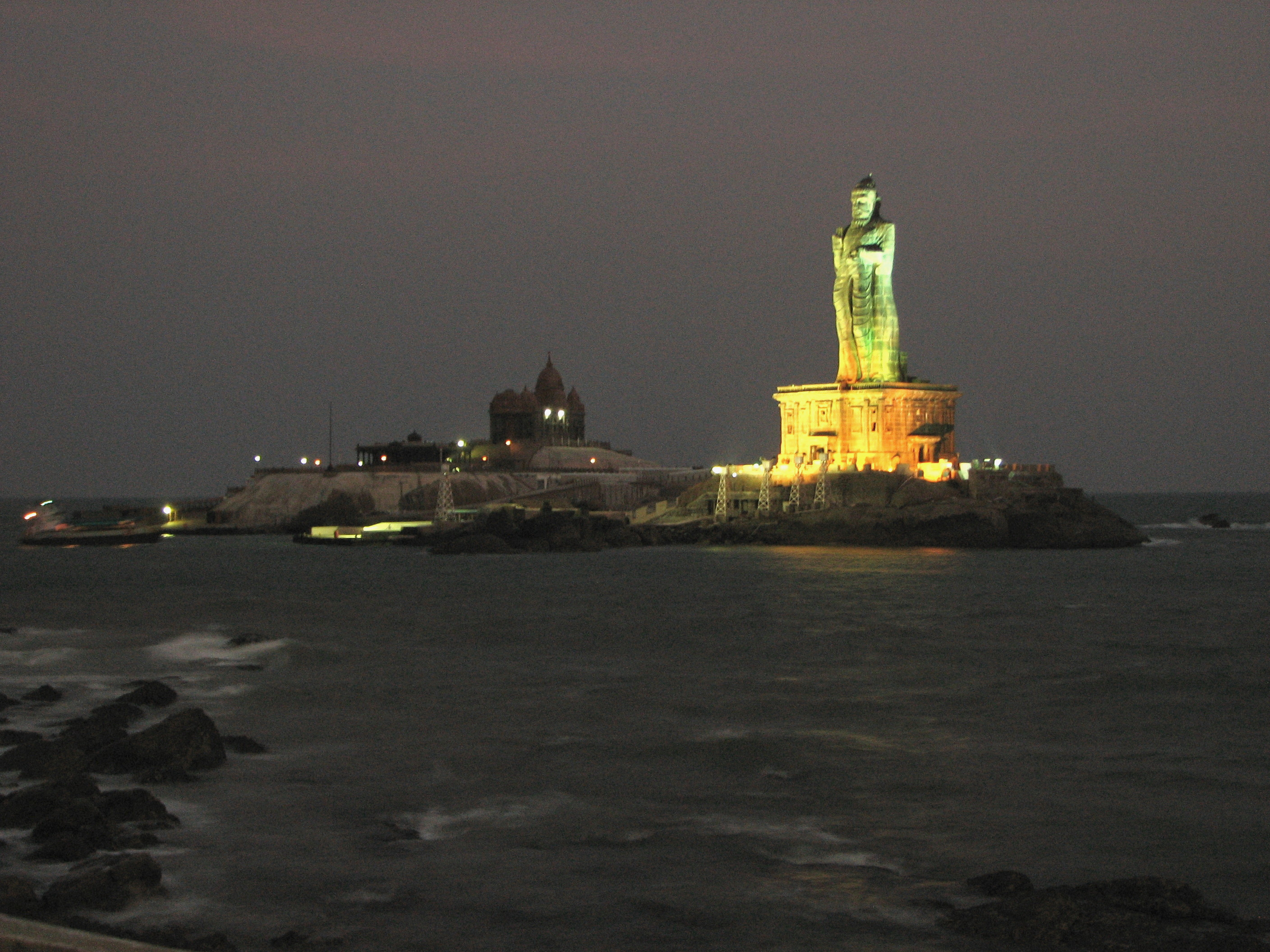
Thiruvalluvar statue illuminated at night

The monument is regarded as a cultural fusion because of its juxtaposition beside the Vivekananda Rock Memorial. Built-in conformation with traditional Indian architecture, the statue has provision to provide a hollow portion inside from toe to scalp. Visitors, however, will not be allowed to scale, but instead be permitted to climb up to the foot of the statue at a height of 12 metres (38 ft).

== Construction ==
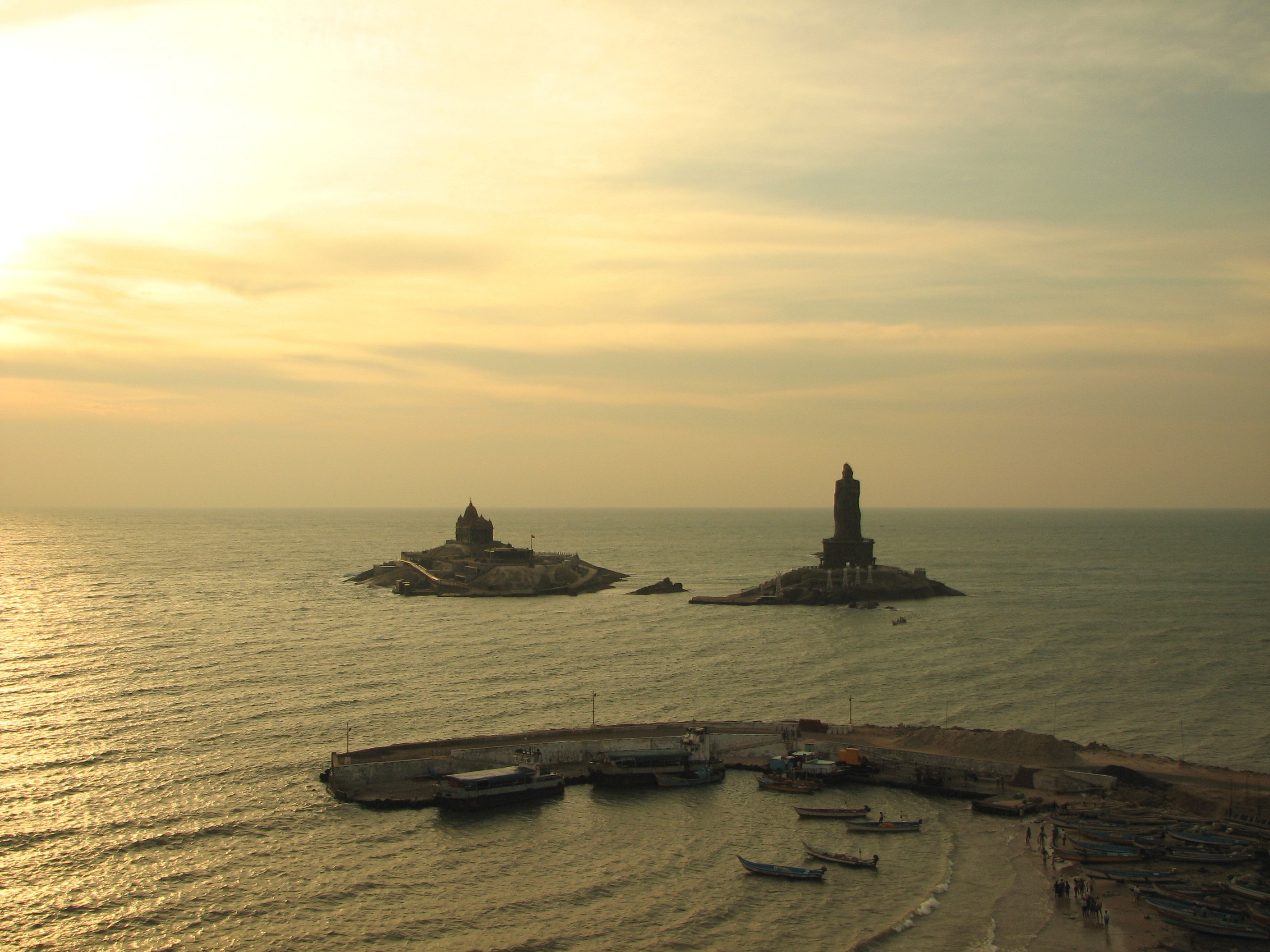
Thiruvalluvar Statue and the adjacent Vivekananda Rock Memorial at sunrise

The project was conceived by then Chief Minister M. Karunanidhi in December 1975. On 15 April 1979, the then Prime Minister Morarji Desai laid the foundation stone for the statue, in the presence of the then Chief Minister, M. G. Ramachandran. However, the actual sculpting work, led by Dr. V. Ganapati Sthapathy, former principal of the Government College of Architecture at Mahabalipuram, began a decade later on 6 September 1990, on the tiny island adjacent to the Vivekananda Rock Memorial when funds were allocated in the 1990–91 budget.

Sthapathy was chosen for the project over 300 master builders because his suggestion for an all-stone monument to the poet-philosopher prevailed. He observed that stone would be more durable than metal, citing that the Statue of Liberty, which is made of copper, required extensive renovation just a century after its installation. Initially, the project stalled, perhaps owing to Karunanidhi's election loss, but then recommenced in 1997 when he returned to office. At the cost of more than ₹61.4 million (equivalent to ₹290 million or US$3.0 million in 2026), the project employed about 150 workers, sculptors, assistants and supervisors, who worked about 16 hours a day to complete the work.

The bend around the waist depicting a dance pose made the design challenging. However, the problem was tackled well in advance by the sculptor by creating a full-length wooden prototype before construction. Study of this prototype led to the identification of an energy line (known in Vastu as kayamadhyasutra), currently an empty cavity in the center of the statue from top to bottom.

The stonework was divided amongst three workshops, in Kanniyakumari, Ambasamudram and Sholinganallur. Ambasamudram contributed 5,000 tonnes (4,900 long tons; 5,500 short tons) of stones, while Sholinganallur was quarried for 2,000 tonnes (2,000 long tons; 2,200 short tons) of high-quality granite stones for the outer portion of the statue. While the largest of the 3,681 stones were 4 metres (13 ft) long and weighed over 15 tonnes (15 long tons; 17 short tons), the majority weighed 3 to 8 tonnes (3.0 to 7.9 long tons; 3.3 to 8.8 short tons). Stones of such proportions were previously used only in Mayan temples in South America. An interesting detail is a 6-metre-high (19 ft) face, with the ears, nose, eyes, mouth, forehead all made of individual stones carved by hand. The work was done mostly by hand, with each carver wearing down 40 to 50 sharp chisels a day. The sculptors' team considered that the manual method on granite stones is the most dependable since machines may tend to break stones and precision is difficult. Stumps of palmyra tree and poles of casuarina (ironwood) were used for scaffolding. It took 18,000 casuarina poles tied together with two truckloads of ropes to reach the top of the statue. The statue was placed on its pedestal on 19 October 1999.

The statue was unveiled on the millennium day of 1 January 2000. The statue was inaugurated on 1 January 2000 by Dr. M. Karunanidhi, the then chief minister of Tamil Nadu. Besides Indian political leaders and celebrities, foreign delegates including those from Malaysia, Singapore, and Sri Lanka, participated in the opening ceremony. Several Tamil teachers from the state of Tamil Nadu took out a rally from Kottaram to Kanniyakumari carrying Tirukkural placards to mark the ceremony. More than fifty thousand people gathered for the event. The chief minister, after unveiling the statue, called it a "beacon of light to guide human life for all time to come."

The monument was hit by the Indian Ocean tsunami on 26 December 2004 but stood unaffected. The statue is designed to survive earthquakes of unexpected magnitude, such as magnitude 6 on the Richter Scale occurring within 100 kilometres (62 mi). This is far beyond that of any event recorded in the regional history because the bedrock in the region is ancient and without known local faults.

== Maintenance ==
To prevent the statue from corrosion due to sea breeze, the statue is chemically treated once in four years. The salty deposits in every joint are removed and replaced with new cement mixture. Paper pulp is then applied on the whole of the statue. As the paper pulp coating dries, it absorbs the salty deposits completely, after which it is removed.

The statue has been thus treated three times since its unveiling. The fourth treatment began on 17 April 2017 and was completed by 15 October 2017.

== Access ==
The statue stands 400 metres (1,300 ft) from the coastline of Kanniyakumari on a small island rock. Ferry service are available from the mainland. The ferry service to Vivekananda Rock Memorial stops for a while at the Valluvar Statue. There is also a pedestrian bridge made of fiber glass, connecting it to the mainland. This bridge is the first of its kind to be built in India, and was built by Government of Tamil Nadu and opened on 31.12.2024.

Kanniyakumari Ferry ticket price to visit Thiruvallur Statue starts from Rs 50 for normal entry and Special Entry from Rs 300. Book online and enjoy a ferry ride to Vivekananda Rock Memorial and Thiruvalluvar Statue.

== Glass bridge ==
There is a glass bridge viz., Kanyakumari Glass bridge also called as Kanyakumari Glass fibre footover bridge, an footover bridge built for pedestrians to cross the sea connecting Thiruvalluvar Statue and Vivekananda Rock Memorial in Kanyakumari which was inaugurated on 30 December 2024.

== Recognition and cultural campaigns ==
In October 2024, Congress MP Vijay Vasanth wrote to the Union Minister of Culture and Tourism, Gajendra Singh Shekhawat, urging the nomination of the Thiruvalluvar Statue in Kanyakumari as a UNESCO World Heritage Site, highlighting its cultural and historical significance.

Separately, in 2025 a 133 sq ft craft paper mosaic artwork of the Thiruvalluvar Statue was created and documented as the largest craft paper mosaic of the statue, partly intended to draw attention to efforts to secure UNESCO recognition.

== Gallery ==
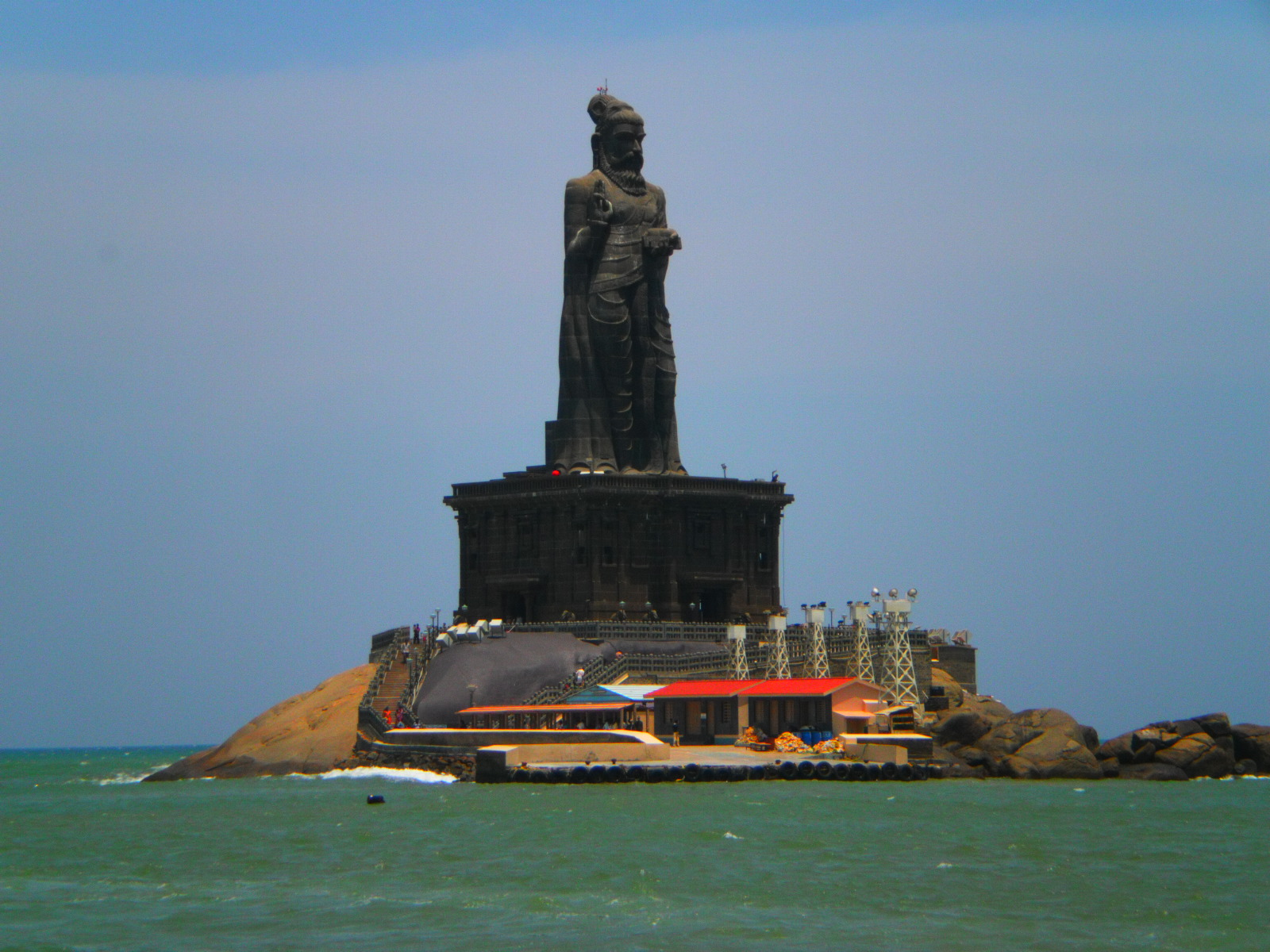
From the ferry

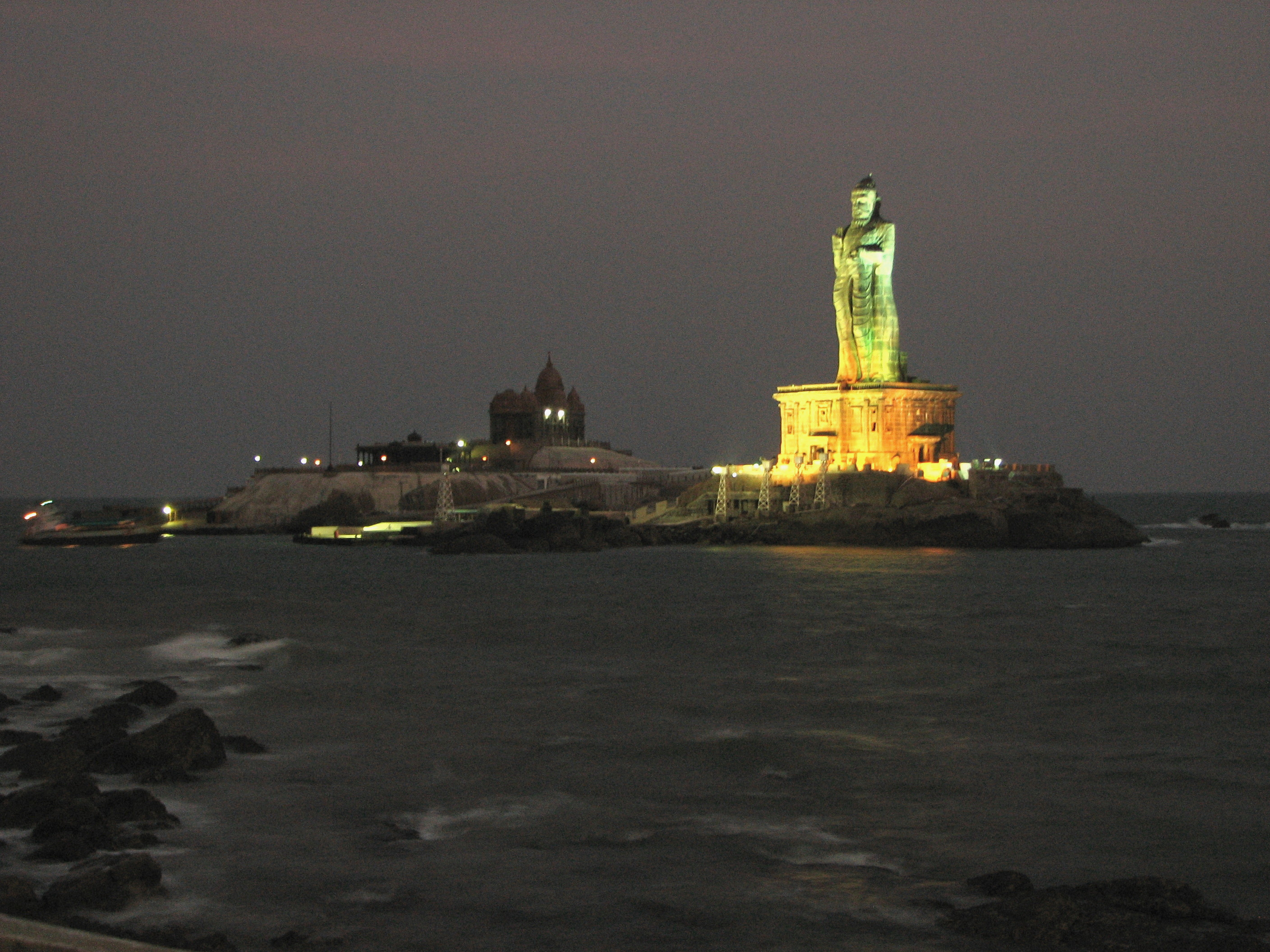
A night view

From the sea below

Foot of the Valluvar Statue

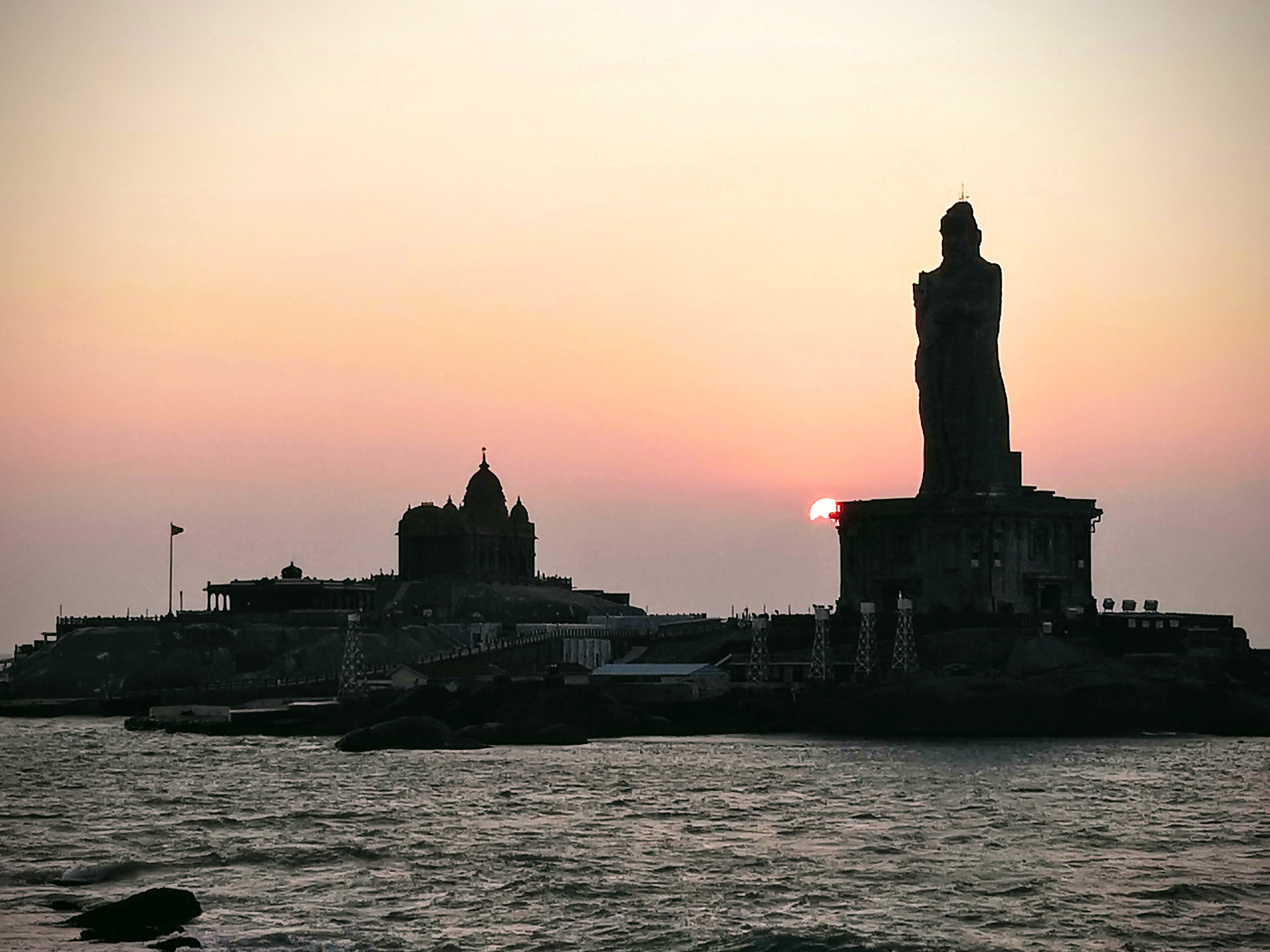
Sunrise View

== See also ==
- Tirukkural
- List of tallest statues
