= Kanyakumari =

Town in Tamil Nadu, India

Kanyakumari Cape Comorin
- Town
- Kanniyakumari
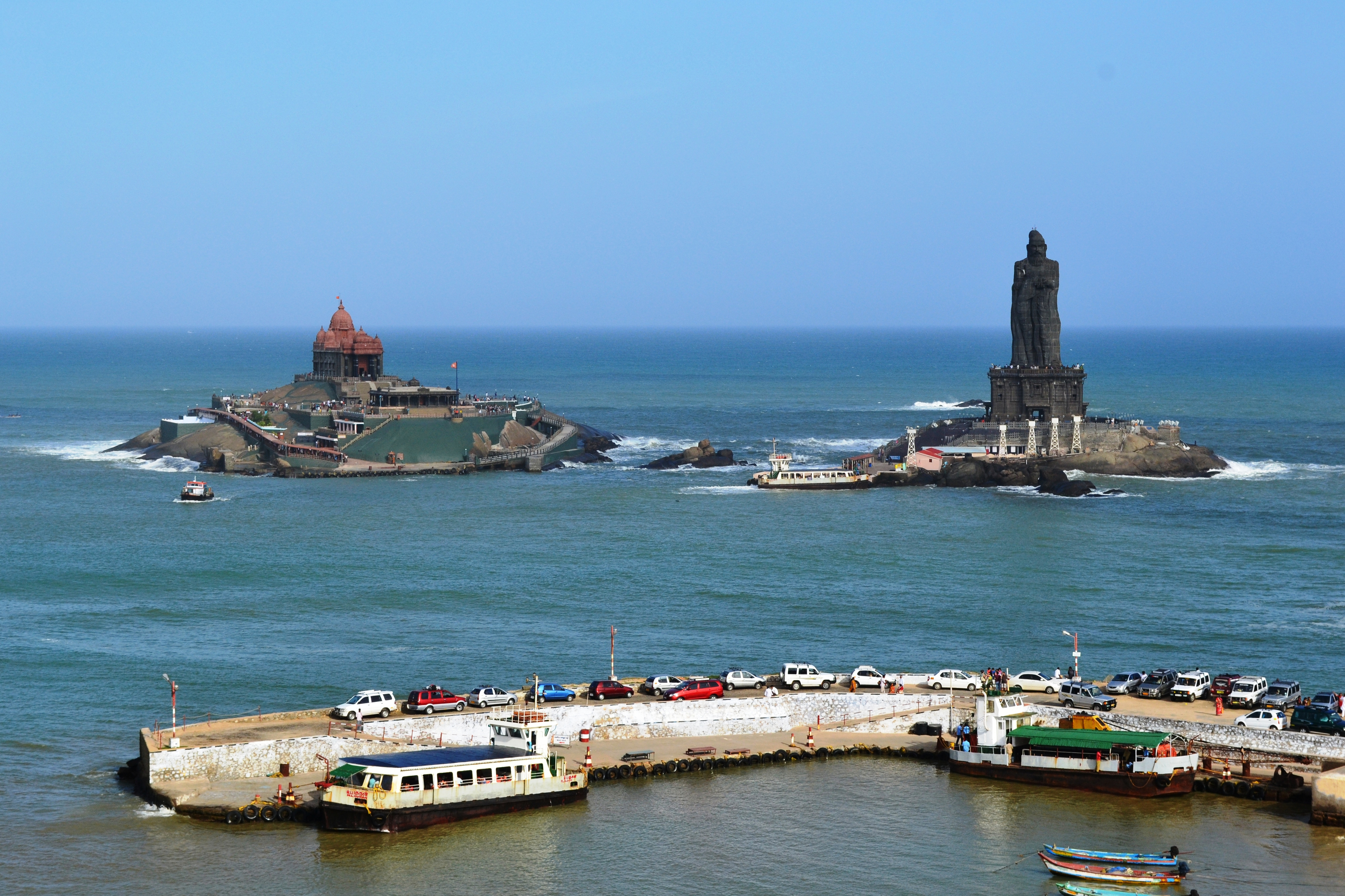
- Vivekananda Rock Memorial, Kanyakumari
- Nicknames: Kumari, Thiruvenisangam
- Kanyakumari, Tamil Nadu Kanyakumari (India)
- Coordinates: 8.088300°N 77.538500°E
- Country: India
- State: Tamil Nadu
- District: Kanyakumari
- Named for: Devi Kanya Kumari

Government
  - Type: Municipality
  - Body: Kanyakumari Municipality
  - District Collector: M. Prathap, IAS
  - District commissioner: Stalin R, IPS
  - Member of Parliament: Vijay Vasanth
  - Member of Legislative Assembly: Thalavai Sundaram
  - Municipality leader: Kumari Stephen

Area
  - Total: 25.89 km^{2} (10.00 sq mi)
- Elevation: 60 m (200 ft)

Population (2011)
  - Total: 29,761
  - Density: 665/km^{2} (1,720/sq mi)

Languages
  - Official: Tamil
- Time zone: UTC+5:30 (IST)
- PIN: 629 702
- Telephone code: 91-4652 & 91-4651
- Vehicle registration: TN 74 & TN 75
- Website: www.kanniyakumari.nic.in

Kanyakumari (lit. 'The Unmarried Girl', referring to Devi Kanya Kumari, officially known as Kanniyakumari, formerly known as Cape Comorin) is a town and municipality in Kanyakumari district in the state of Tamil Nadu, India. It is the southernmost tip of the contiguous Indian subcontinent and the southernmost city in mainland India, and thus it is informally referred to as "The Land's End". Kanyakumari town is about 90 kilometres (56 mi) from Thiruvananthapuram and 20 kilometres (12 mi) south of Nagercoil, the headquarters of Kanyakumari district.

Kanyakumari is a popular tourist destination and pilgrimage centre in India. Notable tourist spots include its unique sunrise and sunset points, the 41-metre (133 ft) Thiruvalluvar Statue, and Vivekananda Rock Memorial off the coast. Lying at the tip of peninsular India, the town is bordered on the west, south, and east by the Laccadive Sea. It has a coastline of 71.5 kilometres (44.4 mi) stretched along these three sides.

On the shores of the city is a temple dedicated to the goddess Kanya Kumari (the unmarried goddess), after which the town is named. Kanyakumari has been a town since the Sangam period and was referred to in old Tamil and Malayalam literature and in the accounts of Ptolemy and Marco Polo.

== History ==
=== Etymology ===
The place derives its name from the goddess Kanya Kumari, considered to be the sister of Krishna. The goddess is believed to remove the rigidity from the mind, and women pray for marriage at her temple. In 1656, the Dutch East India Company conquered Portuguese Ceylon from the Portuguese East Indies, and the name eventually corrupted to "Comorin" and was called "Cape Comorin" during British rule in India. In 2016, the town and its district were renamed to "Kanniyakumari" by the Government of India and the Government of Madras.

=== Legend ===
According to a Hindu legend, Kanya Devi, an avatar of Parvati, was to marry Shiva, who failed to show up on his wedding day. Rice and other grains meant for the wedding feast remained uncooked and unused. The uncooked grains turned into stones as time went by. Some believe that the small stones on the shore today, which look like rice, are indeed grains from the wedding that was never solemnised. Kanya Devi is now considered a virgin goddess who blesses pilgrims and tourists who flock to the town. Her temple in Kanyakumari is a Shakta pitha: a holy shrine in the Shaktism tradition of Hinduism.

According to another Hindu legend, Hanuman dropped a piece of earth near Kanyakumari as he was carrying a mountain with his life-saving herb, Mrita Sanjivani, from the Himalayas to Lanka (Sri Lanka) during the Ramayana War. The fallen earth formed an area called Marunthuvazh Malai, literally "hills where medicine lives". This legend explains the abundance of unique native medicinal plants in the area. Marunthuvazh Malai is located near Kottaram, about 7 km (4 mi) from Kanyakumari town on the Kanyakumari–Nagercoil highway. According to a combination of geographical landmarks, regional mythology, ancient Tamil texts, and local tribal oral histories the sage Agasthya, who was an expert in medicinal herbs, is believed to have lived around this site in ancient days. There is an ashram on the middle of the hillside; tourists trek up to visit the ashram and to glimpse the sea near Kanyakumari town, a few kilometres away.

== Demographics ==
Religion in Kanyakumari town (2011)
| Religion | Percent(%) |
| Christian | 61.16% |
| Hindu | 32.97% |
| Muslim | 5.47% |
| Other | 0.39% |

As per the 2011 Census, Kanyakumari town consisted of 61.16% Christians, 32.97% Hindus, and 5.47% Muslims. It had a population of 19,739, comprising 9,884 males and 9,855 females, making the sex ratio (number of females per thousand males) of the town 1,003. A total of 2,403 people were under six years of age and the child sex ratio (number of females per thousand males under six years of age) stood at 1,024. The town had an average literacy of 88.62%, higher than the national average of 59.5%. There were a total of 4,236 households in the town.

As of 2001, Kanyakumari had a total of 5,929 main workers: 11 cultivators, 78 agricultural labourers, 66 in household industries, and 5,774 other workers. There were a total of 119 marginal workers: 4 marginal cultivators, 3 marginal agricultural labourers, 11 marginal workers in household industries, and 101 other marginal workers.

== Geography ==
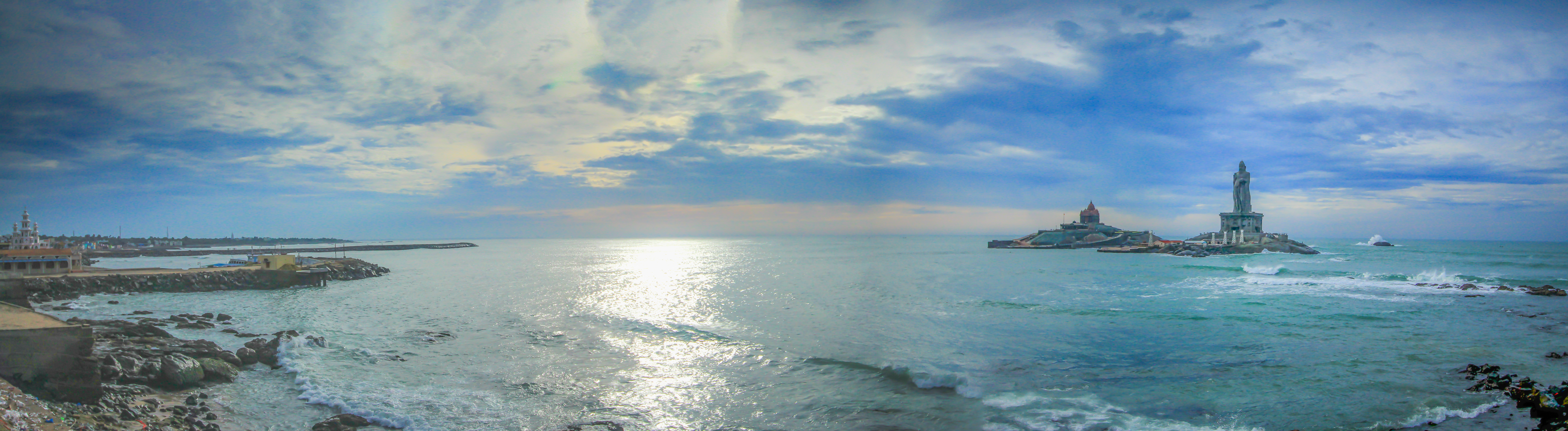
Panoramic full view of the Thiruvalluvar Statue and the Vivekananda Rock Memorial, on the Laccadive Sea

Kanyakumari is located at 8.08°N 77.57°E and has an average elevation of 30 metres. The peninsular tip of Kanyakumari is bordered on three sides by the Laccadive Sea. It is located at the confluence of the Western Ghats and Eastern Ghats. The nearest city is Thiruvananthapuram, Kerala (85 km (53 mi) away), and the nearest town is Nagercoil, the administrative headquarters of Kanyakumari district (22 km (14 mi) away).

Kanyakumari is at the southern tip and is the southernmost point of the contiguous Indian subcontinent. As such, it is part of the common Hindustani phrase used to describe the length of India: "Kashmir se Kanyakumari"; before the partition, the phrase in undivided India was "Khyber se Kanyakumari". However, the southernmost point of Republic of India is at Indira Point on Great Nicobar Island, at 6°45’10″N and 93°49’36″E.

=== Climate ===
The climate is a hot semi arid climate, bordering on a tropical savanna climate, influenced by monsoons.

Climate data for Kanyakumari (1991–2020, extremes 1961–2020)
| Month | Jan | Feb | Mar | Apr | May | Jun | Jul | Aug | Sep | Oct | Nov | Dec | Year |
|---|---|---|---|---|---|---|---|---|---|---|---|---|---|
| Record high °C (°F) | 34.4 (93.9) | 35.0 (95.0) | 36.0 (96.8) | 36.8 (98.2) | 38.2 (100.8) | 36.2 (97.2) | 36.2 (97.2) | 36.7 (98.1) | 35.5 (95.9) | 35.2 (95.4) | 35.6 (96.1) | 34.6 (94.3) | 38.2 (100.8) |
| Mean daily maximum °C (°F) | 31.3 (88.3) | 32.1 (89.8) | 32.7 (90.9) | 33.1 (91.6) | 32.5 (90.5) | 30.8 (87.4) | 30.6 (87.1) | 30.7 (87.3) | 30.7 (87.3) | 30.8 (87.4) | 30.6 (87.1) | 30.6 (87.1) | 31.4 (88.5) |
| Mean daily minimum °C (°F) | 23.5 (74.3) | 24.0 (75.2) | 25.2 (77.4) | 26.1 (79.0) | 26.1 (79.0) | 24.6 (76.3) | 24.2 (75.6) | 24.2 (75.6) | 24.3 (75.7) | 24.4 (75.9) | 24.1 (75.4) | 23.8 (74.8) | 24.5 (76.1) |
| Record low °C (°F) | 19.7 (67.5) | 18.8 (65.8) | 21.4 (70.5) | 20.9 (69.6) | 21.3 (70.3) | 19.3 (66.7) | 19.0 (66.2) | 20.8 (69.4) | 21.0 (69.8) | 20.2 (68.4) | 20.1 (68.2) | 19.0 (66.2) | 18.8 (65.8) |
| Average rainfall mm (inches) | 15.1 (0.59) | 7.9 (0.31) | 9.7 (0.38) | 47.4 (1.87) | 75.3 (2.96) | 74.4 (2.93) | 44.5 (1.75) | 37.1 (1.46) | 60.3 (2.37) | 154.2 (6.07) | 191.5 (7.54) | 63.2 (2.49) | 780.6 (30.73) |
| Average rainy days | 0.9 | 0.7 | 1.1 | 2.6 | 3.3 | 6.4 | 3.9 | 2.9 | 4.0 | 7.7 | 9.2 | 3.6 | 46.1 |
| Average relative humidity (%) (at 17:30 IST) | 67 | 68 | 71 | 75 | 79 | 80 | 80 | 80 | 81 | 80 | 76 | 69 | 75 |
Source: India Meteorological Department

== Notable landmarks ==
=== Thiruvalluvar Statue ===
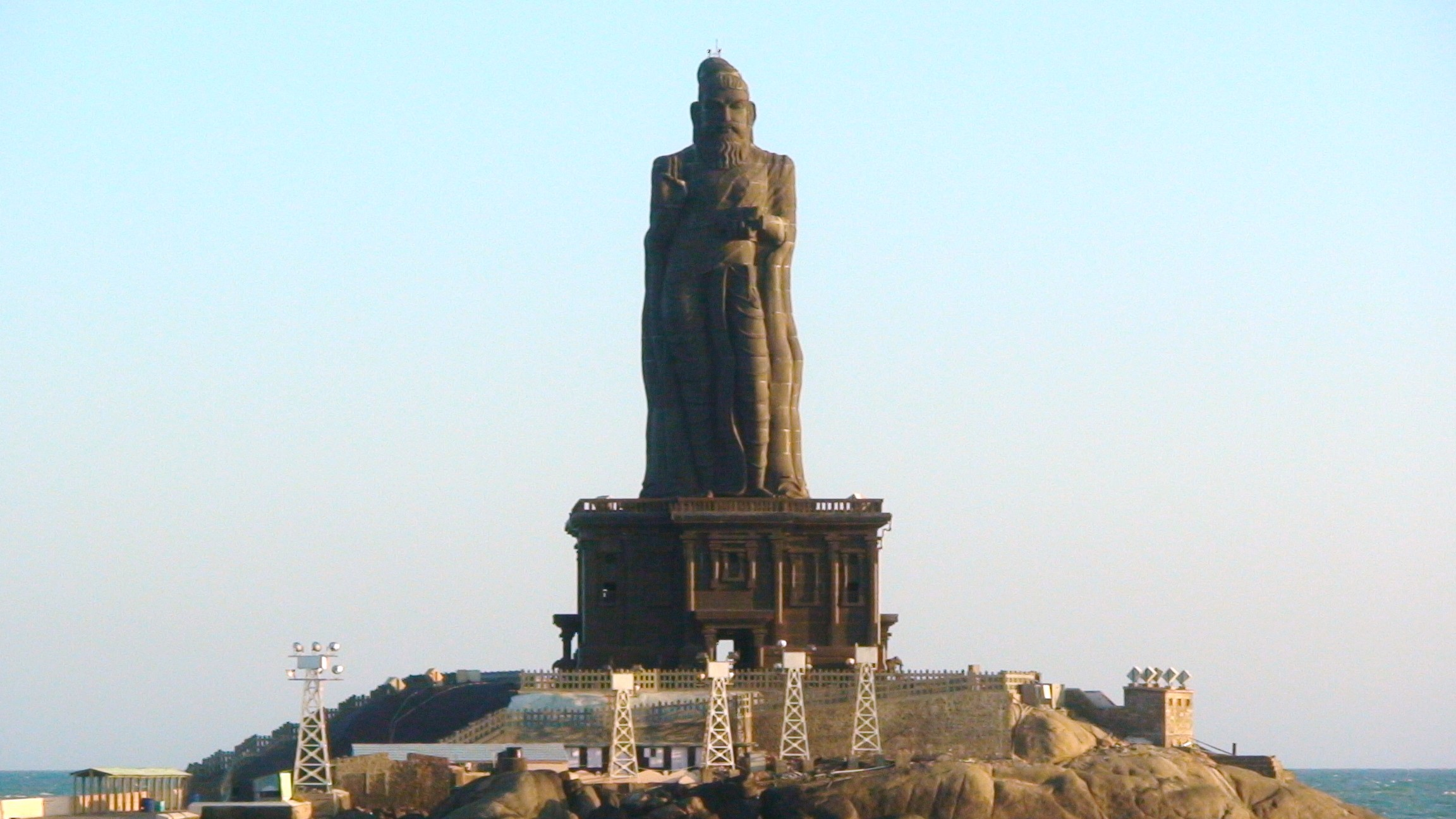
Thiruvalluvar Statue

The Thiruvalluvar Statue is a 7,000-ton stone statue of poet and philosopher Valluvar. It has a height of 29 metres (95 feet) and stands upon an 11.5-metre (38 ft) rock that represents the 38 chapters of virtue in the Thirukkural. The statue standing on the rock represents wealth and pleasures, signifying that wealth and love be earned and enjoyed on the foundation of solid virtue. The combined height of the statue and pedestal is 133 ft (40.5 m), denoting the 133 chapters in the Thirukkural.

The statue is reminiscent of a dancing pose of Nataraja. It was sculpted by the Indian sculptor V. Ganapati Sthapati, who also created the Iraivan Temple, and its opening ceremony was on 1 January 2000. The monument was hit by the Indian Ocean tsunami on 26 December 2004, but stood unaffected. The statue is designed to survive earthquakes of high magnitude. During maintenance work, as well as during rough sea, entry is restricted for tourists.

=== Vivekananda Rock Memorial ===
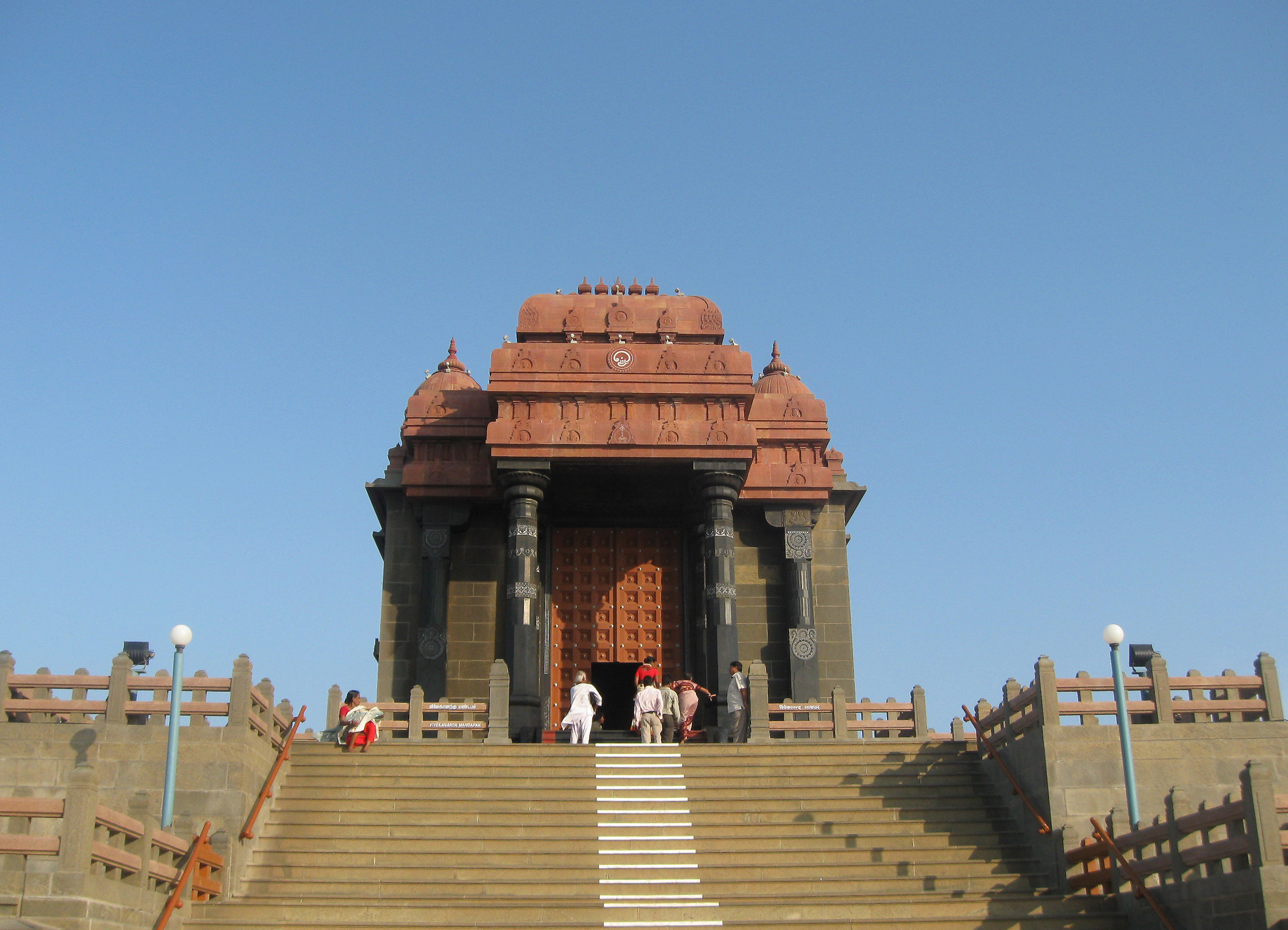
Vivekananda Rock Memorial

The Vivekananda Rock Memorial is a popular tourist monument in Vavathurai, Kanyakumari, India. The memorial stands on one of two rocks in the Laccadive Sea, located about 500 metres (1,600 ft) east of the mainland of Vavathurai. It was built in 1970 in honour of Swami Vivekananda who is said to have attained enlightenment on the rock. According to local legends, it was on this rock that Goddess Kumari performed austerity. A meditation hall (Dhyana Mandapam) is also attached to the memorial for visitors to meditate. The design of the mandapa incorporates different styles of temple architecture from all over India. It houses a statue of Vivekananda. The memorial consists of two main structures: the Vivekananda Mandapam and the Shripada Mandapam.

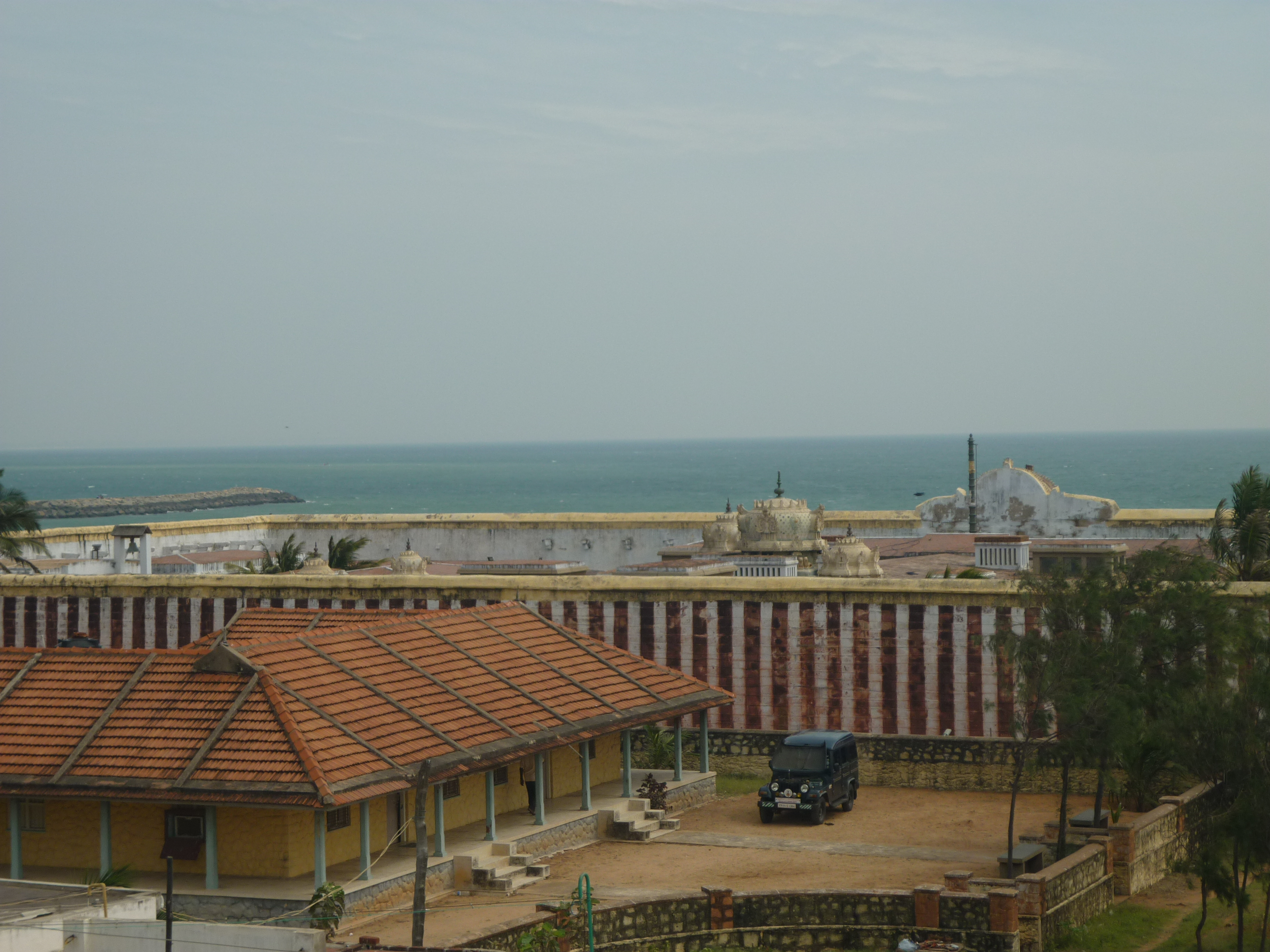
Bhagavathy Amman Temple, Kanyakumari

=== Bhagavathy Amman Temple ===
Bhagavathy Amman Temple is a 3,000-year-old temple dedicated to Goddess Kumari Amman located at Kanyakumari on the shore of the Laccadive Sea. Kumari Amman is one of the forms of Devi, popularly known as "Kumari Bhagavathy Amman". The temple is the first Durga temple created by Lord Parasurama and one of the 108 Shakthi Peethas. It is mentioned in the Ramayana, Mahabharata, and Purananuru.

=== Gandhi Memorial Mandapam ===
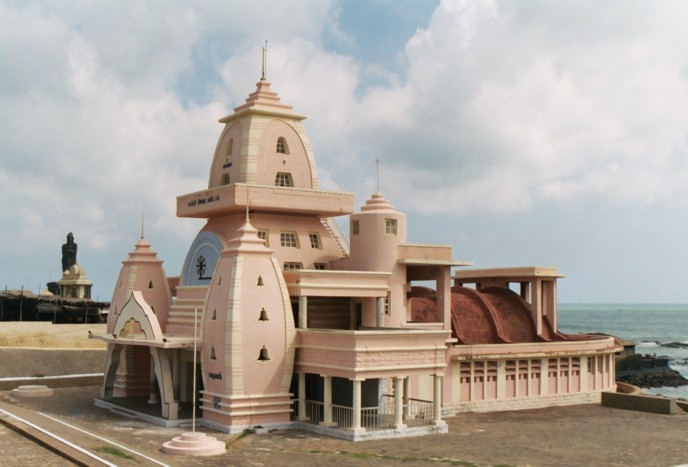
Gandhi Memorial Mandapam, Kanyakumari

The Gandhi Memorial Mandapam has been built on the spot where the urn containing the Mahatma's ashes was kept for public viewing before immersion. Resembling central Indian Hindu temples in form, the memorial was designed such that on Gandhi's birthday, 2 October, the first rays of the sun fall on the exact place where his ashes were kept.

=== Kanyakumari Pier ===
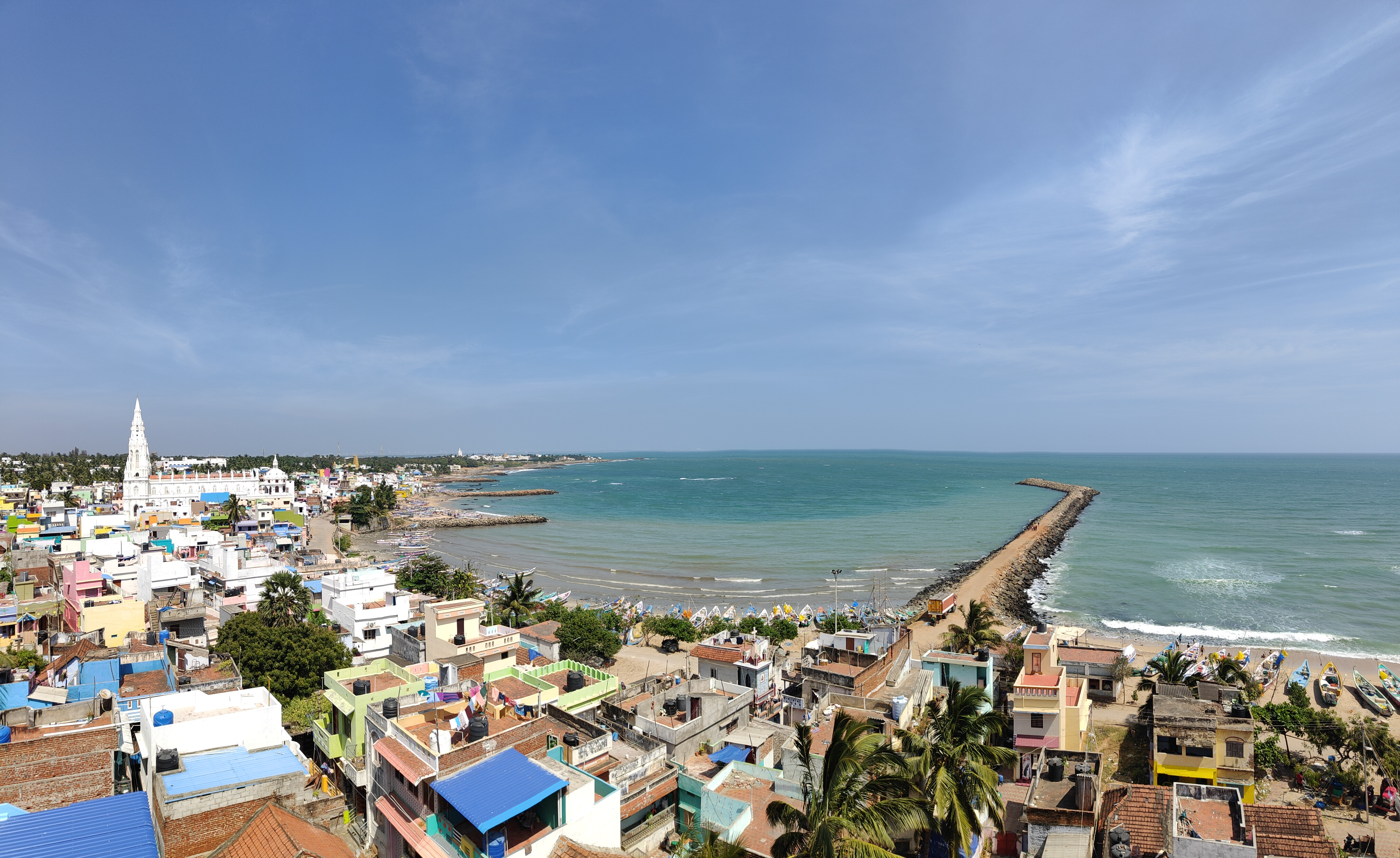
Kanyakumari Pier

Kanyakumari Pier or Sunset View Point is considered one of the iconic locations in Kanyakumari. It is situated at a point where three oceans meet: the Bay of Bengal, the Laccadive Sea, which is connected to the Indian Ocean, and the Arabian Sea.

=== Kamarajar Mani Mantapa Monument ===
Kamarajar Mani Mantapa Monument was raised and dedicated to K. Kamarajar, a freedom fighter, former Chief Minister of Tamil Nadu, and President of Indian National Congress. He is also popularly known as "Black Gandhi" among the masses. Like the Gandhi Memorial Mandapam, this monument is where Kamarajar's ashes were kept for the public to pay homage before immersion into the sea.

=== Tsunami Memorial Park ===
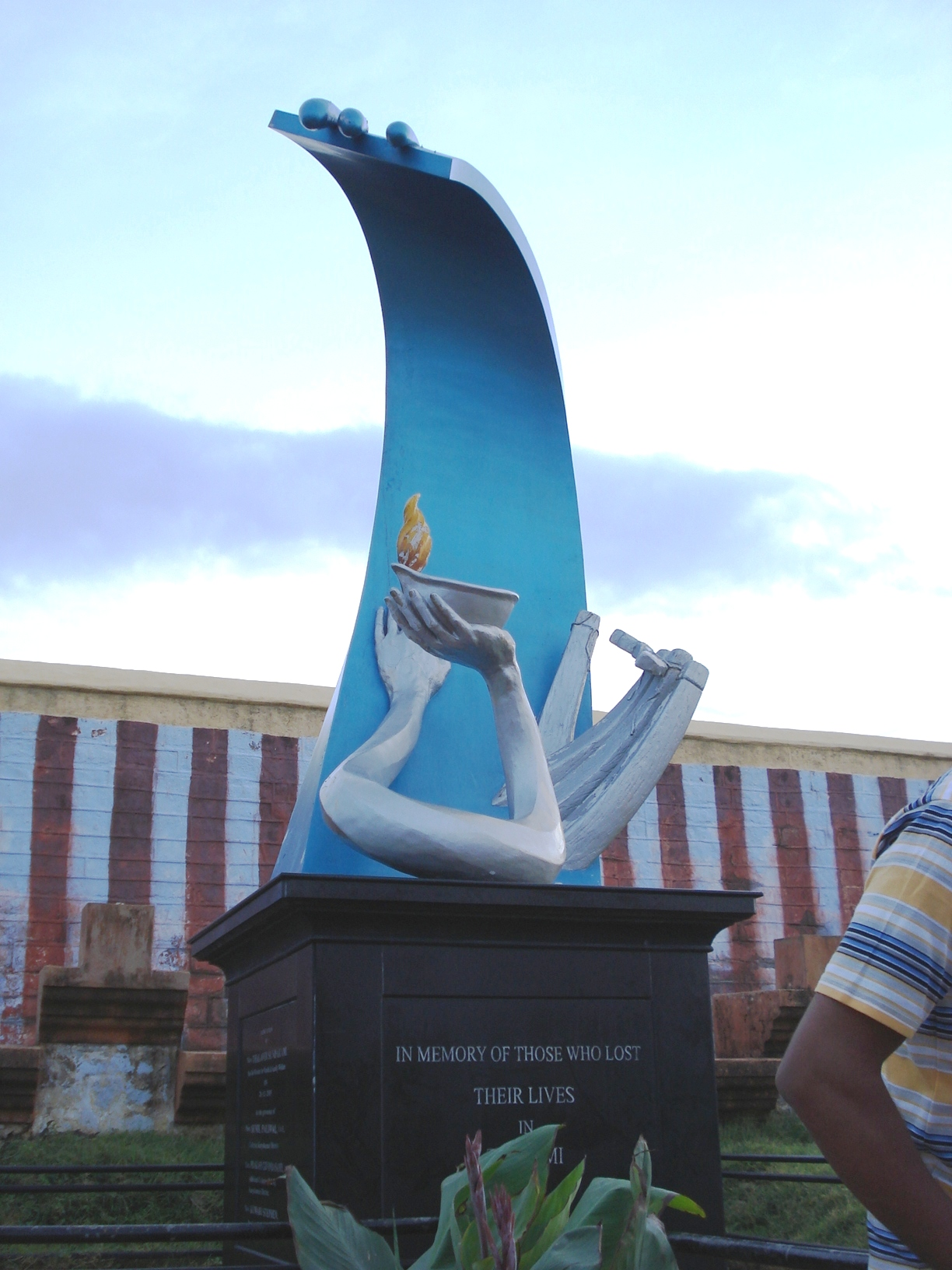
Tsunami Memorial, Kanyakumari

Near Kanyakumari's southern shore stands a monument to the memory of those who died in the 2004 Indian Ocean earthquake and tsunami, an underwater megathrust earthquake that claimed around 230,000 lives in many countries, including India, Sri Lanka, Somalia, Thailand, Maldives, and Indonesia.

== Localities ==
- Peyode

== Tourism ==
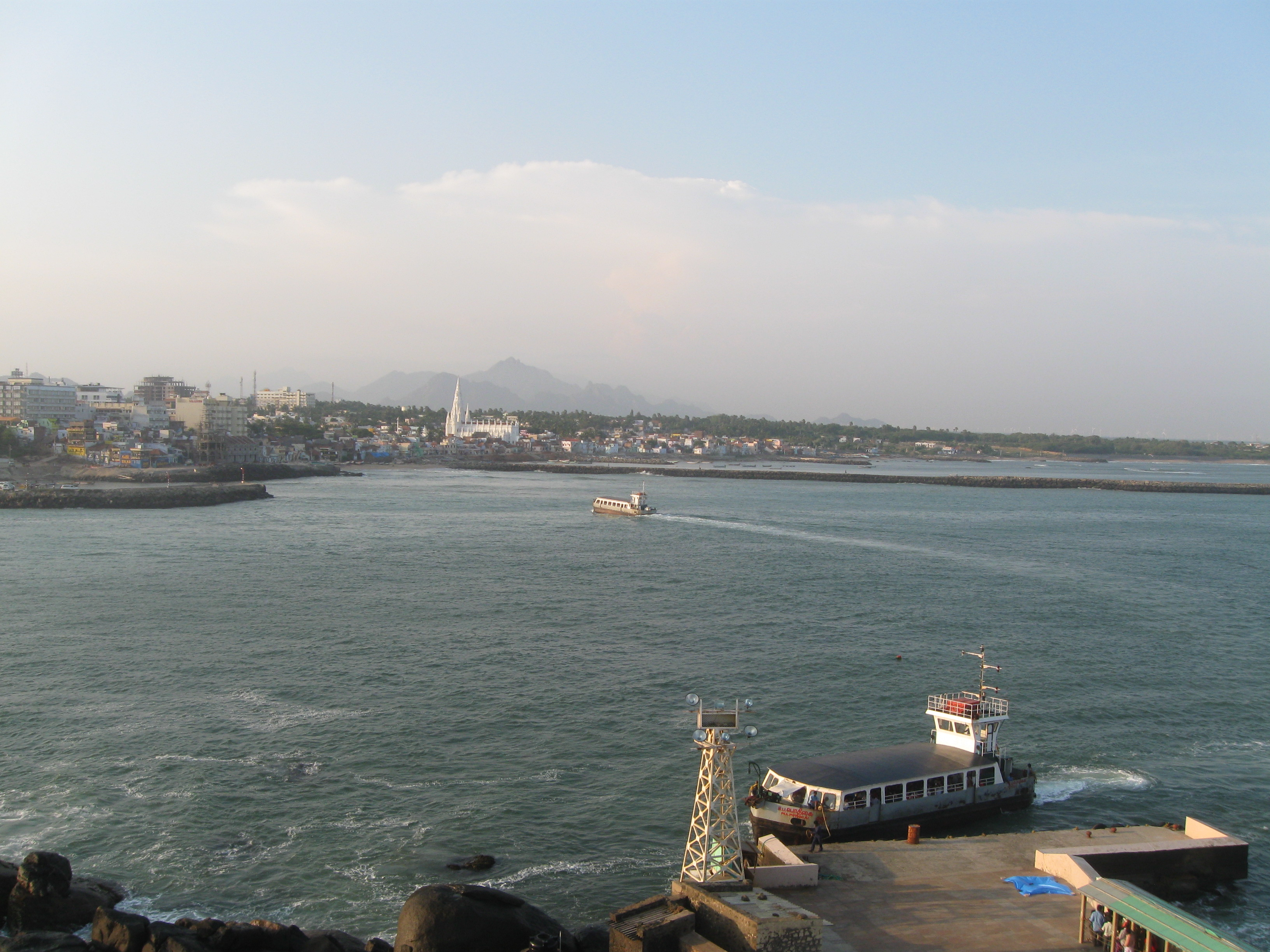
Ferries transport tourists from the mainland to Vivekananda Rock Memorial and Tiruvalluvar Statue (where this photo was taken).

The state-owned Poompuhar Shipping Corporation runs ferry services between the town and the Vivekananda Rock Memorial and Thiruvalluvar Statue, both situated on rocky islets off the coast. The operation of the ferry service began in 1984. Two ferries were used until June 2013, after which a third ferry was added to the service on the occasion of 150th birth anniversary of Swami Vivekananda.

== Transport ==
=== Roadways ===
There are two major National Highways (NH) roads originating from Kanniyakumari town. One is the National Highway 44 which connects Kanniyakumari with Srinagar of Jammu & Kashmir. NH 44 connects North India with South India. The road passes through Madurai, Hosur, Bengaluru, Hyderabad, Nagpur, Jhansi, Delhi and Jalandhar. It covers 3745 kilometres. The other is the National Highway 66 that connects Kanniyakumari with Panvel (38 km from Mumbai) in Maharashtra. NH 66 roughly runs north–south parallel to the western ghats. It passes through Thiruvananthapuram, Kochi, Kozhikode, Mangaluru, Udupi, Margoa and Ratnagiri. Nagercoil, the district capital is well connected with the rest of Tamil Nadu.

==== SETC Buses ====
The government transport body State Express Transport Corporation (SETC) is operating direct buses to Chennai, Ootacamund, Coimbatore, Vellore, Chidambaram, Thiruchirappalli, Kodaikanal, Tirupur, Erode, Kalpakkam, Velankanni, and Thiruvannamalai. It also operates direct buses to Bengaluru, Pondicherry and Tirupati. Some bus services to the aforesaid destinations are originating from Kanniyakumari, Colachel, Marthandam, Kulasekaram, Kaliyakkavilai, and Thiruvananthapuram.

==== TNSTC Buses ====
Another government transport body known as Tamil Nadu State Transport Corporation (TNSTC) operates direct buses to various destinations inside Tamil Nadu. Some of the terminating stations are Chennai, Tiruppur, Periyakulam, Kodaikanal, Rameswaram, Thiruchirappalli, Dindigul, Thanjavur, Palani, Salem, Coimbatore, Karaikudi, Kumily, Bodinayakkanur, Erode, and Sivakasi. Most of these buses starts their journey from Nagercoil while some buses starts from Kanniyakumari, Marthandam, Colachel, Kulasekaram, and Kaliyakkavilai. TNSTC also operates frequent bus services to Madurai, Tirunelveli, Tiruchendur, Tuticorin, and Thiruvananthapuram.

==== KSRTC Buses ====
The Government of Kerala operating KSRTC Buses between Kerala and Tamilnadu from Thiruvananthapuram to Nagercoil, Kanniyakumari and KSRTC Bus between Holy Places Haripad, Thiruvananthapuram, Nagercoil, Mylaudy, Athankarai Pallivasal (Tirunelveli dist).

=== Rail ===
The Kanyakumari railway station and nearby Nagercoil railway station offer direct connection by Indian railways to almost all metropolitan cities in India.

=== Airways ===
The nearest international airport is Thiruvananthapuram International Airport which is 76 km from Kanniyakumari. The Civil Aviation Ministry is planning to construct an airport near Swamithoppu in Kanniyakumari District as the initiative attracts international tourists to the district.

Kanyakumari has heliports for VVIP visitors at the Tri Sea Hotel on Beach Road.
